= LaPlanche Street =

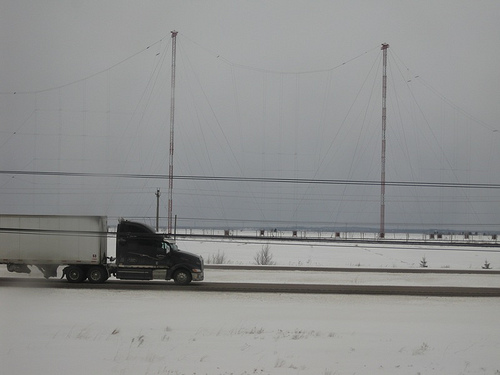
A view from LaPlanche Street near Sackville, NB

LaPlanche Street is the historic connector between Nova Scotia and New Brunswick, Canada. Located on the Isthmus of Chignecto, LaPlanche crosses the Tantramar Marshes between Amherst, NS and Sackville, NB. Historically, it hosted the key forts of peninsular Nova Scotia and continental Acadia and witnessed the Battle of Fort Beauséjour, the key battle between the two colonies during the Seven Years' War, and the Battle of Fort Cumberland of the American Revolutionary War.

== History ==
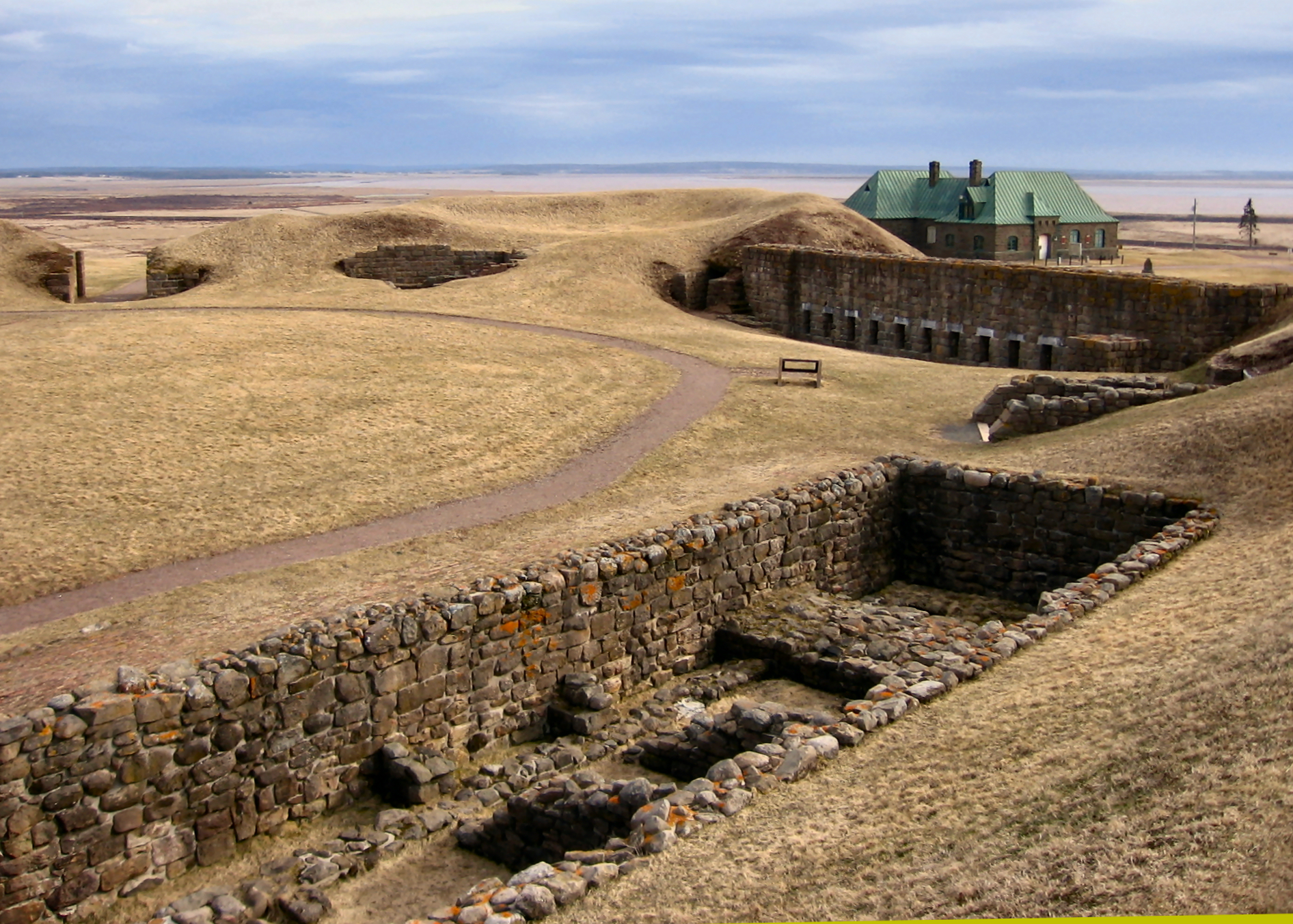
Fort Beauséjour - Fort Cumberland National Historic Site of Canada

When originally settled by the Acadians, the Tantramar community was called Beaubassin. La Planche means "the plank" and describes a plank-bridge route over what is now also called Laplanche River. This would eventually extend into the principal route between Continental Acadia (New Brunswick) and (then) Peninsular Acadia (Nova Scotia).

=== 1700s ===
As the major throughway between two rival colonies, British Nova Scotia and Acadia, early LaPlanche was guarded by two forts. In 1750 Fort Lawrence (located in the present-day community called Fort Lawrence on the Missaguash River, just west of Amherst, NS) was built by British troops on LaPlanche Street to defend the border of Nova Scotia. In response, the French built Fort Beauséjour on Beauséjour ridge (now Aulac Ridge). In the Battle of Fort Beauséjour (1755), the opening mark of the French and Indian War, Fort Beauséjour fell to the British, led by Lieutenant-Colonel Monckton. Recognizing its superiority, the British burned their own Fort Lawrence and moved into Fort Beauséjour, renaming it Fort Cumberland. Acadia's Great Upheaval began in Beaubassin immediately after this battle.

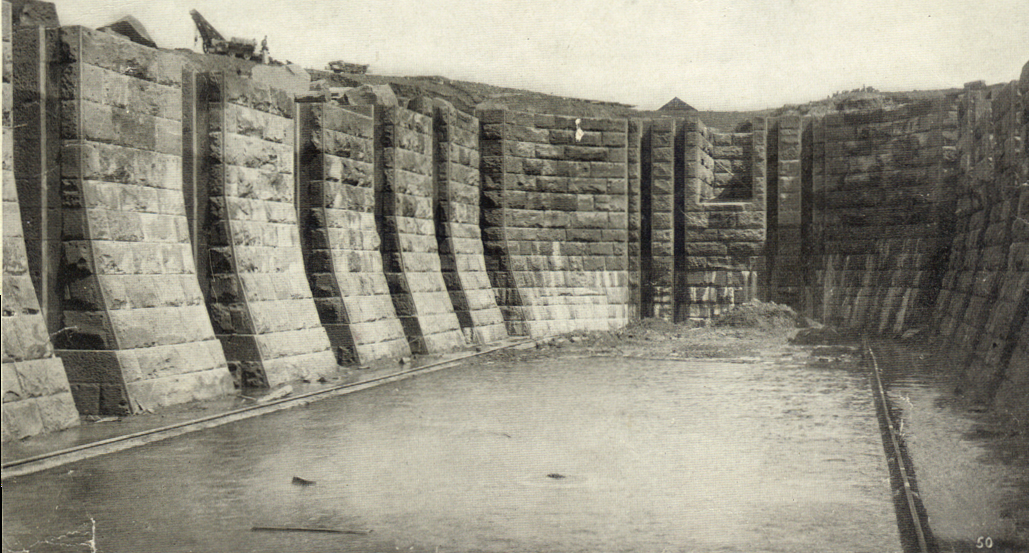
The southern dock of the Chignecto Ship Railway, on the Missaguash River, Fort Lawrence

Two decades later, Jonathan Eddy tried to bring the American Revolutionary War to Nova Scotia with Battle of Fort Cumberland. Eddy and his militia of 400 men stormed the fort in 1776. The British successfully defended and thus ensured loyalty to the British throne for Nova Scotia during the revolution. In the decades to follow Amherst, Sackville and Aulac (LaPlanche Street's midpoint) would be populated by waves of English-speaking settlers, namely the New England Planters and the Yorkshire settlers.

=== 1800s ===
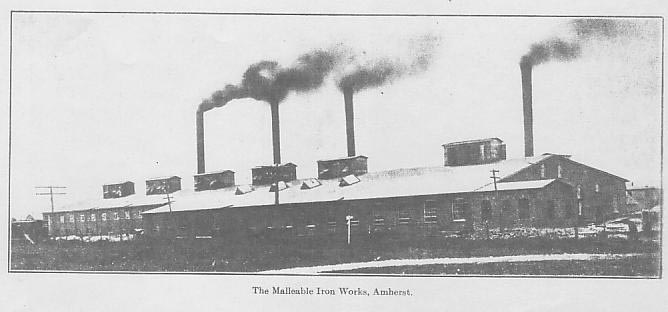
Maleable Iron Works, LaPlanche Street, Amherst, Nova Scotia

La Planche Street would also serve as the southern end of the Chignecto Ship Railway - had it been completed. Designed by Henry Ketchum, the ship railway would have been one of the most impressive engineering feats of its day. The railway would use two steam locomotives to transport small cargo and passenger ships between the upper Bay of Fundy and the Northumberland Strait, with the potential to reduce the 800 kilometre journey-by-sea around Nova Scotia to a mere 24 kilometres. It ran between Fort Lawrence, Nova Scotia, outside Amherst, and Tidnish on the, Northumberland Strait. In 1891, federal funding was withdrawn and the project never saw fruition.

=== 1900s ===
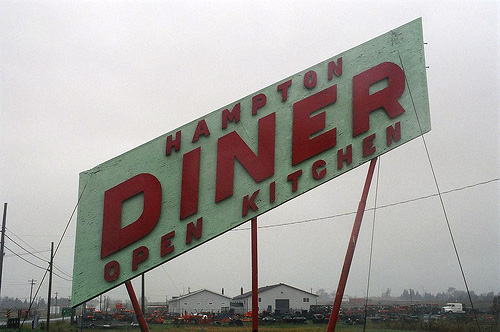
The historic Hampton Diner.

Both Sackville and Amherst would develop into industrial towns. On the western end of LaPlanche Street (now called Bridge Street, NB Route 106) was Sackville's downtown core. On the eastern end (still called LaPlanche Street, NS Route 204) was Amherst's old industrial park immediately before its downtown. The LaPlanche industrial park manufactured railway passenger and freight cars, boilers, engines, automobile parts and generator plants and was home to the Rhodes Curry Company, the Canadian Car and Foundry Co., Robb Engineering Co., Malleable Iron Co., McLean Milling Co., Oxford Worsted Co., Hewson Woolen Mills, Eastern Pants Co., M. Shane & Co., News Publishing Co., and E. Biden & Sons. As more advanced industrial centres developed elsewhere, LaPlanche's industry fell into disuse. In the 1960s it was replaced by a newer, smaller industrial park on the Trans-Canada Highway.

As the major throughway between mainland Canada and Nova Scotia and Prince Edward Island, LaPlanche hosted many tourist-oriented businesses. It sustained three diners famous in local memory: Mel's Tea Room (Sackville), Eva's Place (Aulac), and The Hampton Diner (Fort Lawrence). Nova Scotia built its Tourist Welcome Centre on LaPlanche Street in Fort Lawrence, placing it between the east and west-bound lanes.

=== Now ===
The 1960s saw the Trans-Canada Highway system being upgraded to four-lane expressways. This included a new route between Sackville and Amherst running roughly parallel to LaPlanche Street (Nova Scotia Highway 104-Nova Scotia Trunk 2 meeting New Brunswick Highway 2). Services inevitably became concentrated at the Aulac exit, where the PEI route branches, and LaPlanche Street's economy began to fade. Various bridges and sections of LaPlanche Street were dismantled and the street was divided into three disconnected segments. The Sackville segment (Bridge Street) remains vital, while Aulac and Amherst's host numerous dilapidated shops, plants and motels, and serve the fringe economy and culture of the two communities, masking the centuries of history for which it was stage.

== Geography ==
=== Chignecto Isthmus ===
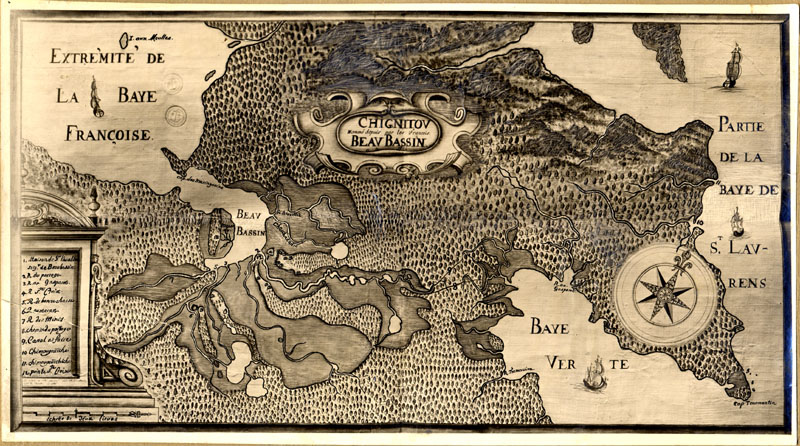
An historic map of the Chignecto Isthmus.

LaPlanche Street traverses the low-lying, southern edge of the Chignecto Isthmus, which connects Nova Scotia with New Brunswick and thus mainland Canada. The Isthmus runs from the Petitcodiac River in Dieppe, New Brunswick to Amherst, Nova Scotia and has as its two oceanic boundaries the Chignecto Bay, a sub-basin of the Bay of Fundy, and the Northumberland Strait, an arm of the Gulf of St. Lawrence. The isthmus is made up of the Tantramar Marshes, at sea level, and four ridges that emerge from the Bay of Fundy and rise north-easterly:

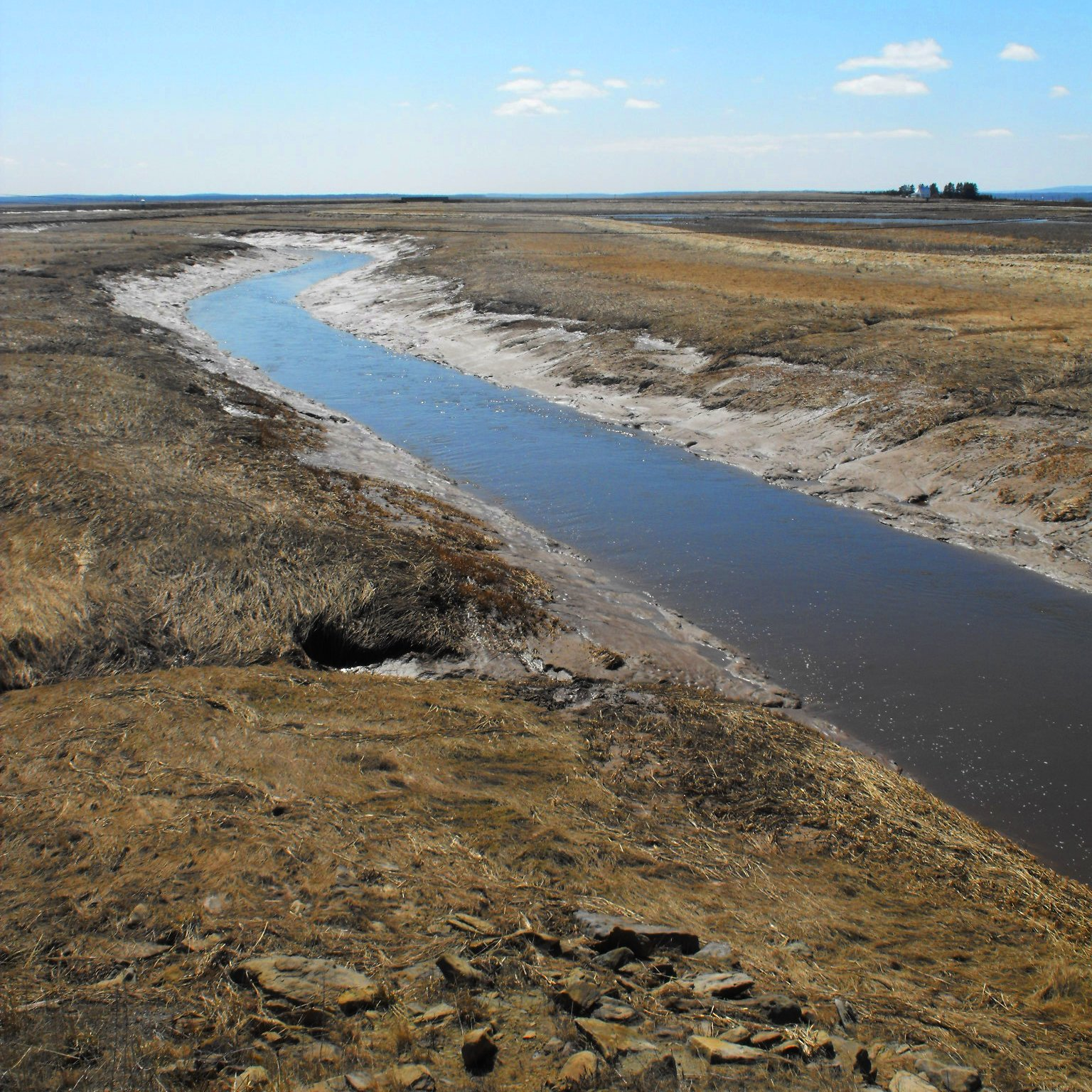
The Missaguash River.

- Fort Lawrence Ridge: The site of Amherst, NS and the historic location of Beaubassin, Acadia's second settlement (after Port Royal), and Britain's Fort Lawrence.
- Aulac Ridge: The site of Aulac, NB and Fort Beauséjour – Fort Cumberland. Formerly Beauséjour Ridge. Between Fort Lawrence Ridge and Aulac Ridge is Tongue's Island, the former seat of the Acadian Government.
- Sackville Ridge: Site of Sackville, NB on its eastern edge and Dorchester, NB on its west.
- Memramcook Ridge: Site of Memramcook; between Petitcodiac and Memramcook Rivers.

=== Tantramar Marshes ===
The Tantramar Marshes were once salt marshes that stretched 10 km inland from the Chignecto Bay. Diked by the Acadians, they are now fertile hay fields and a National Wildlife Area. The marshes are drained by four tidal rivers:

- Aulac River
- LaPlanche River
- Missaguash River
- Tantramar River
