= Fort Lawrence, Nova Scotia =

Rural community in Nova Scotia, Canada

Coordinates: 45°50′56.86″N 64°15′39.31″W

Fort Lawrence in Nova Scotia

Fort Lawrence is a Canadian rural community located on the Isthmus of Chignecto in Cumberland County, Nova Scotia, which is named after Fort Lawrence.

Situated 1 km east of the Missaguash River which forms the inter-provincial boundary with New Brunswick, Fort Lawrence is situated on a low ridge facing Aulac to the west and Amherst to the east. Aside from the more prominent Aulac Ridge, the Fort Lawrence Ridge is surrounded by the flat plain of the Tantramar Marshes with a commanding view of the Cumberland Basin, an arm of the Bay of Fundy.colonel benjamin chapman built a large wood frame home for his family while he was in command of the Fort Lawrence and Chapman house remained with descendants until late 1970s when ancestral home was sold.

== History ==
Referred by the Mi'kmaq as 'Kwesomalegek,' meaning "a hardwood point", the area of the Tantramar Marshes containing Fort Lawrence was settled in 1672 by Acadians who named it 'Beaubassin.' The area was also known as Missiquash or Missaguash, a Mi'kmaq name meaning "marsh river."

=== Father Le Loutre's War ===
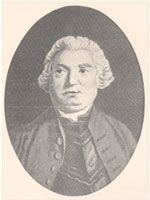
Charles Lawrence

Following the 1713 Treaty of Utrecht which gave Britain control of Acadia, the boundaries between this territory and that of New France were unclear but a quasi boundary at Beaubassin was established. During Father Le Loutre's War Major Charles Lawrence constructed a log stockade installation that he named Fort Lawrence on the ridge in 1750 as part of a campaign by the British Army to reduce to obedience the Acadian settlers and Mi'kmaq in the district. In response, the French military constructed the more elaborate Fort Beauséjour on the Aulac Ridge, 1.5 km to the west.

=== French and Indian War ===
The Battle of Beausejour later took place between June 4-June 16, 1755 which saw the British forces from Fort Lawrence gain control of Fort Beauséjour as the opening salvo in the Seven Years' War that would result in continental dominance for Britain.

Fort Lawrence soon fell into disrepair and nothing remained of the facility after several decades. The community and ridge it sits upon now bears the name he gave the fort.

=== Transportation ===
In 1872 the Intercolonial Railway of Canada was constructed south of the community, on the route between Truro and Moncton. The Chignecto Marine Transport Railway Company, Limited began construction of the Chignecto Ship Railway in the 1880s across the Isthmus of Chignecto with its western terminus in the Cumberland Basin immediately west of Fort Lawrence; the project ran into technical and financial problems and was abandoned in 1891 before it was fully opened.

The original road through Fort Lawrence was called LaPlanche Street. In the 1960s, Highway 104, the Trans-Canada Highway, was constructed across the ridge immediately north of the site of the fort. It connected with Highway 2 in New Brunswick at the bridge over the Missaguash River. The Nova Scotia provincial government constructed a visitor information centre with a traffic circle which was famous in the summer months when a bag piper would serenade tourists. Subsequent highway upgrades saw a new 4-lane alignment built several dozen metres to the north.

=== Today ===
Today's community of Fort Lawrence consists of a handful of small mixed farms and residential homes, largely functioning as a suburb of Amherst. The original alignment of the 1960s-era Trans-Canada Highway has been redesignated Laplanche Street and is a local road connecting to the west end of Amherst. Several closed hotels and restaurants were once located along this once-busy strip but have since been demolished. A few businesses remain open mainly dedicated to agriculture & forestry equipment, metalworking, and automotive / motorcycle shops.
