= John Fletcher (literary theorist) =

British scholar, literary theorist, and psychoanalytic theorist

Professor John Fletcher
- Awards: Enid Derham Prize

Education
- Education: University of Melbourne, University of Oxford

Philosophical work
- School: Continental Philosophy
- Institutions: University of Warwick; University College London
- Main interests: Psychoanalytic Theory; Literary Theory; Shakespeare; Cultural Theory

John Fletcher is a British psychoanalytic and literary theorist. He is professor of English and Comparative Literary Studies at the University of Warwick and holds an honorary position at University College London's Psychoanalysis Department. He is also a Founding Scholar of the British Psychoanalytic Council. He has written extensively on authors and topics including Freud, Laplanche, 18th-19th century Gothic literature, 16th-20th century English poetry, Marxism, and gender studies, and has authored and edited many dozens of books and articles. Additionally, Fletcher is largely responsible for the editing, translation, and presentation of the works of Jean Laplanche and the reception of Laplanche beyond French academia and into English-speaking countries.

== Career ==
Fletcher has co-edited and co-translated many major English publications of essay collections by Laplanche, including Essays on Otherness (1999), a special issue in the cultural theory journal New Formations with contributions by Fletcher himself and essays by Laplanche and his co-thinkers (2003), and Laplanche's final collection of essays, Freud and the Sexual (2011).

In 2013, Fletcher published the monograph Freud and the Scene of Trauma, which traces the determining and interactive function of scenes [traces of unstable memory fragments] operating by a logic of Afterwardsness in producing psychoanalytic phenomena and constituting the relations between metapsychological structures. With this book, Fletcher's insightful understanding of Freudian theory and skilful interpretation of Laplanche was widely recognised, and received praise in reviews by other experts in the field. The book was described as a "gem" for students of psychoanalytic theory by psychoanalyst Peter Fonagy and literary theorist Judith Butler described the chapters of the book as "distinguished not only by their enormous theoretical power and precision, but by Fletcher's nearly uncanny ability to read both literary and theoretical texts with great powers of illumination and nuance". Fletcher's work is widely praised and follows Freud and Laplanche in an exhaustive yet precise and original scholarly pursuit, being as such a necessary step for the acceptance of French psychoanalysis in the Anglophone world.

The 2014 book Seductions and Enigmas: Laplanche, Theory, Culture was edited by Fletcher and Nicholas Ray, and features contributions by Judith Butler and Jacques André

In 2000, Fletcher interviewed Laplanche alongside British philosopher Peter Osborne, with the interview being published in Radical Philosophy.
