= Laplanche =

Laplanche is a surname. Notable people with the surname include:

- Jean Laplanche (1924–2012), French author, theorist and psychoanalyst
- Louise LaPlanche (1919–2012), American actress
- Renaud Laplanche (born 1970), French American entrepreneur and business executive
- Rosemary LaPlanche (1923–1979), Miss America winner

== See also ==
- LaPlanche Street, in Canada
