= Migration from Yorkshire to Nova Scotia =

Migration from Yorkshire to Nova Scotia occurred between 1772 and 1775 and involved an approximate one thousand migrants from mainly Yorkshire, England arriving in Nova Scotia in efforts to maintain occupancy of the territory by British sympathizing groups to maintain the land free of its Acadian population following their deportation.

The immigration was the initiative of the Lieutenant Governor of the colony, Michael Francklin. The first settlers arrived in 1772 aboard the ship Duke of York. Between 1773 and 1775 several additional ships arrived, peaking in 1774 with the arrival of 9 vessels.

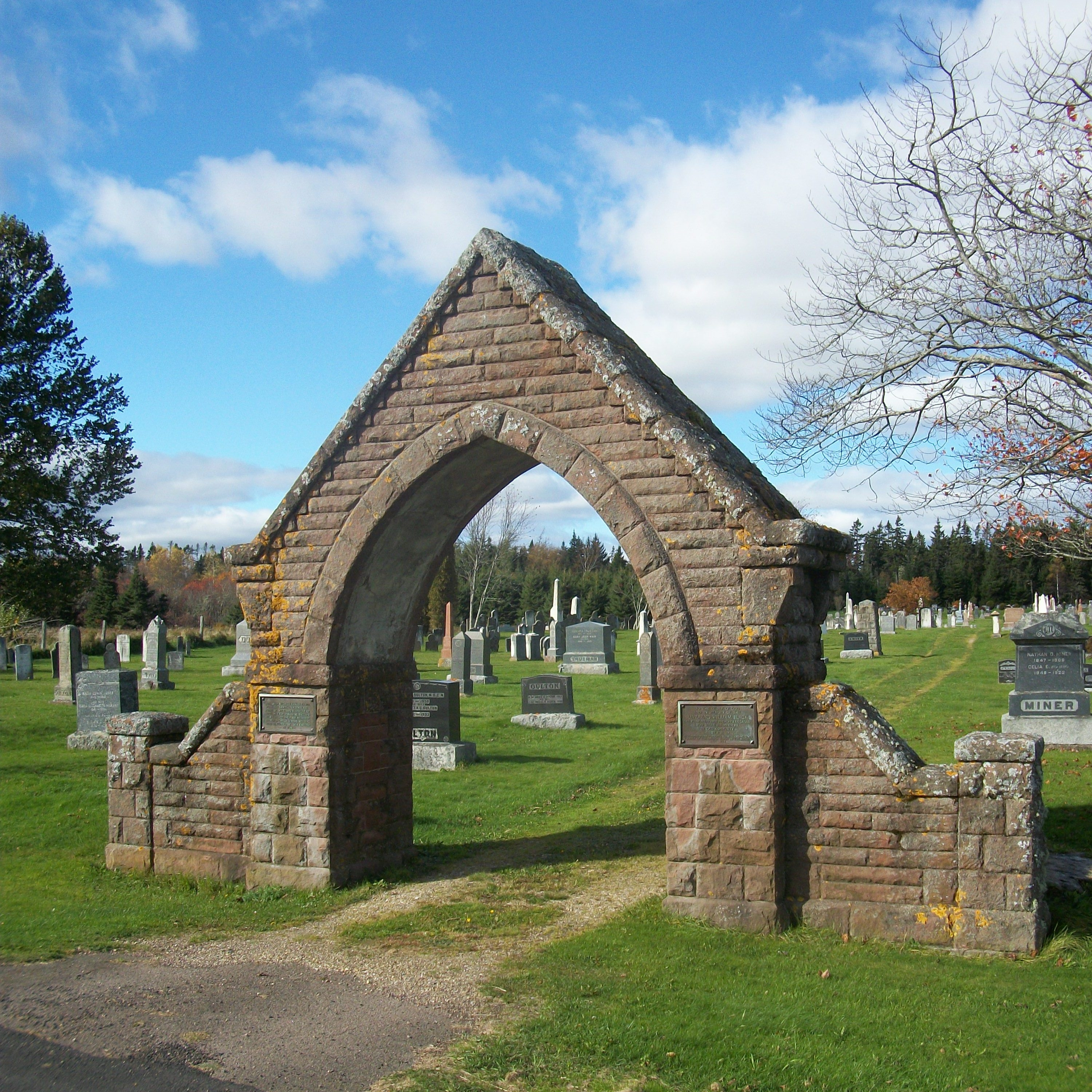
Cemetery in Point de Bute, New Brunswick, near where the first Methodist church stood.

Many of the Yorkshire pioneers were Wesleyan Methodists and were responsible for establishing the earliest Methodist chapels in Canada (1790).

The immigrants were mostly tenant farmers in Yorkshire, although a few also came from Northumberland. They left for Nova Scotia "in order to seek a better livelihood". Rather than receiving land grants from the government, as had the previous immigrants, the New England Planters, the new arrivals came with money and purchased their lands from the government or from Planters who were at the time beginning to leave.

It has been argued that these pioneers were instrumental in preventing victory by American sympathisers during the Eddy Rebellion of 1776. Named for Jonathan Eddy, the Rebellion was an attempt to wrestle Nova Scotia from the British in order for it join the thirteen colonies in the newly created United States. Aiding British troops from Halifax, the Yorkshire pioneers helped subdue the rebels, including some New England Planters that supported the American Revolution, in a three-week siege of Fort Cumberland.

== See also ==
- English Canadian

== Sources ==
- The Yorkshire Emigration website. The site also provides the surnames of the settlers
- Tantramar Heritage Trust, Inc. website. This site hosts additional information about the August 2000 reunion of the descendants of these original emigrants from Yorkshire England
