= Chignecto, Nova Scotia =

Community in Nova Scotia, Canada

Coordinates: 45°44′9.24″N 64°12′34.54″W

Chignecto in Nova Scotia

Chignecto is a community in the Canadian province of Nova Scotia, located in Cumberland County on the Isthmus of Chignecto. Its name is derived from a Mi'kmaq word.
