= Beaubassin =

Former Acadian village on NS NB border

Coordinates: 45°50′56.86″N 64°15′39.31″W

Beaubassin in Nova Scotia (c. 1671 – 1750)

Beaubassin was an important Acadian village and trading centre on the Isthmus of Chignecto in what is now Nova Scotia, Canada. The area was a significant place in the geopolitical struggle between the British and French empires. It was established in the 1670s on an upland close to an extensive area of saltwater marsh. Settlers reclaimed the land to engage in cattle ranching and trade.

== French colony ==
The settlement had strong ties with Port Royal, and Jacques Bourgeois, a farmer, shipbuilder, and merchant, sold a part of his holdings there to settle in the Chignecto Basin, where he built a flour-mill and a saw-mill. Around the same time Michel Leneuf de la Vallière de Beaubassin set up a fur-trading post on the isthmus, while devoting part of his time to the fishing, farming, settlement, and soldiering. Following success in the latter activity, in 1676 governor Frontenac granted him 100 square leagues land which became the Beaubassin seigneury. He established himself on an upland known as Île de la Vallière, later Tonge's Island.

The settlement prospered on the fertile Tantramar Marshes and surrounding high ground, suitable for farming. The isthmus was also the site of a portage between the Bay of Fundy and the Northumberland Strait and lay at the heart of a vast trading network encompassing Île Royale, Nova Scotia and New England.

The first fruit trees were brought from Port Royal by an Irishman, Roger Kuessey (Caissy or Quessey), who established himself on a highland now known as the Butte à Roger. In 1685 the site was inspected by intendant Jacques de Meulles who reported that the grasslands around the settlement was sufficient to fatten thousands of head of cattle, that there were 22 habitations, of which most had a dozen or more cattle and as many each of pigs and sheep, but that not much land was cultivated.

In 1686, Beaubassin was made a parish when Abbot Claude Trouvé built a church. The settlement eventually extended up to Mill Creek, Petitcodiac, Memramcook, and the Shepody Rivers.

By 1715, it is thought that Beaubassin was home to 50 families, 32 acres of apple orchards, 1,000 head of cattle, and 800 hogs. There was also a trading post which traded with Louisbourg (in present-day Cape Breton) via Baie Verte and the Northumberland Strait, and New England, via the Bay of Fundy.

By 1750, the population was about 2,800. Other villages in the immediate area included Weskak (now Westcock), Pré-des-Bourgs (Sackville), Pré-des-Richards (Middle Sackville), and Aulac. About half of the population were refugees from mainland Nova Scotia.

== Beginnings of warfare ==
The settlement was subject to attacks from New England starting with the 1696 Raid on Chignecto during Queen Anne's War, led by Benjamin Church. In 1704 he returned and attacked the Beaubassin region again.

== Destruction ==
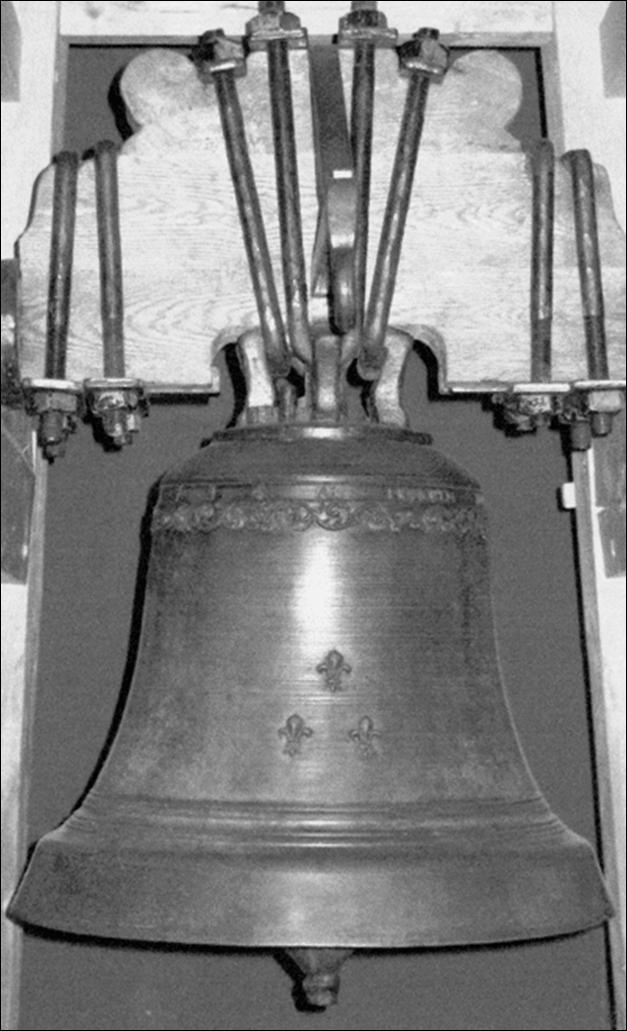
Beaubassin/ Fort Beausejour Cathedral Bell

Beaubassin was located at a site of strategic military importance. The peace and prosperity of Beaubassin was ended by rivalry between Britain and France for the control of Canada in the mid 1700s. Acadia comprised most of what is now the Maritimes, as well as parts of Québec, and northern Maine. With the 1713 Treaty of Utrecht, the part of Acadia today known as peninsular Nova Scotia became another British colony on the eastern seaboard. The area now known as New Brunswick remained under French control, as did what are now known as Prince Edward Island (then known as Île Saint-Jean) and Cape Breton Island (then known as Île Royale).

Due to disagreements in interpretation of the treaty provisions delineating Acadia's boundaries, the ownership of New Brunswick was disputed. An informal dividing line was established on the Isthmus of Chignecto at the Missiguash River, near the site of Beaubassin.

In May 1750, the British dispatched Major Charles Lawrence, along with 800 troops, to seize control of the Isthmus of Chignecto and construct a fort near the French post of Point Beauséjour, future site of Fort Beauséjour.

As the British arrived, the French and their allies burned the town to prevent its use by the enemy. Forty-five buildings were burned. The Acadian population abandoned the village and sought refuge on the other side of the Missaguash River on Point Beauséjour. Major Lawrence and his troops later built Fort Lawrence near the site. The bell was saved from Notre Dame d'Assumption Church and eventually put it into a cathedral at Fort Beauséjour.

== Aftermath ==
The British occupancy of the Isthmus of Chignecto marked the beginning of the end of French power in Acadia. Less than five years later, British and New England troops used Fort Lawrence as their base to capture Fort Beausejour in June 1755, followed soon after by the Expulsion of the Acadians from the area.

== The site today ==
In 2004, Parks Canada acquired a significant portion of the lands on which Beaubassin once stood and the site was designated a National Historic Site of Canada in 2005. The site includes the separately designated Fort Lawrence National Historic Site. There is a stone marker near the Nova Scotia visitor centre off the Trans-Canada Highway in Amherst, Nova Scotia commemorating the village's existence.

The pastured fields of the former Beaubassin village contain extensive archaeological resources including glass and ceramic artifacts and charred buildings that attest to the Acadian way of life. Modern buildings have impacted the archaeological resources, but much of the land is still agricultural or marshland. Cellar depressions demarcate the buildings that once made up the settlement.

== Demographics ==
Population of Beaubassin
| Year | Number of inhabitants |
|---|---|
| 1671 | 127 |
| 1686 | 119 |
| 1693 | 174 |
| 1698 | ? |
| 1701 | 188 |
| 1703 | 246 |
| 1707 | 326 |
| 1714 | 345 |
| 1730 | 1,010 |
| 1737 | 1,816 |
| 1748 | 2,800 |
