= Fort Beauséjour =

Fort in Aulac, New Brunswick, Canada

- Aulac, New Brunswick
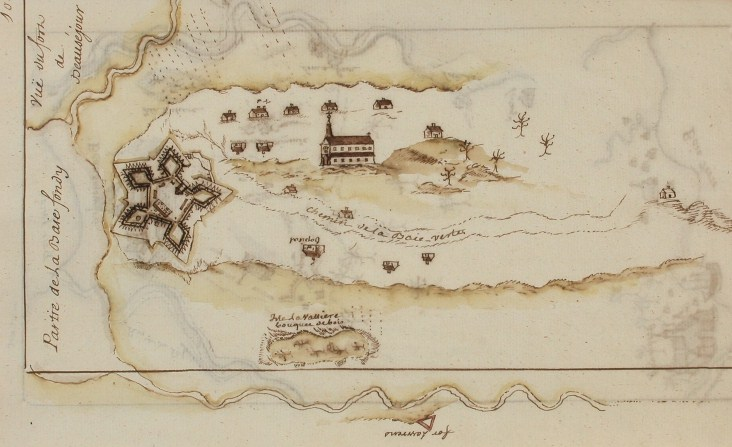
- Fort Beauséjour and Cathedral (c. 1755)

Site information
- Type: Fortress
- Controlled by: France (1751–1755), United Kingdom (1755–1835), Parks Canada (1926–present)

National Historic Site of Canada
- Official name: Fort Beauséjour – Fort Cumberland National Historic Site of Canada
- Designated: 1920

Location
- Coordinates: 45°51′53″N 64°17′29″W

Site history
- Built: 1751
- In use: 1751–1835

Fort Beauséjour (French pronunciation: [fɔʁ boseʒuʁ]), renamed Fort Cumberland in 1755, is a large, five-bastioned fort on the Isthmus of Chignecto in eastern Canada, a neck of land connecting the present-day province of New Brunswick with that of Nova Scotia. The site was strategically important in Acadia, a French colony that included primarily the Maritimes, the eastern part of Quebec, and northern Maine of the later United States. The fort was built by the French from 1751 to 1752. They surrendered it to the British in 1755 after their defeat in the Battle of Fort Beauséjour, during the Seven Years' War. The British renamed the structure as Fort Cumberland. The fort was strategically important throughout the Anglo-French rivalry of 1749–63, known as the French and Indian Wars by British colonists. Less than a generation later, it was the site of the 1776 Battle of Fort Cumberland, when the British forces repulsed sympathisers of the American Revolution.

Since 1920 the site has been designated as a National Historic Site of Canada, named the Fort Beauséjour – Fort Cumberland National Historic Site. Portions of the fort have been restored, and a museum and visitor facilities were added to the site. It attracts about 6000 visitors annually.

== Historical context ==
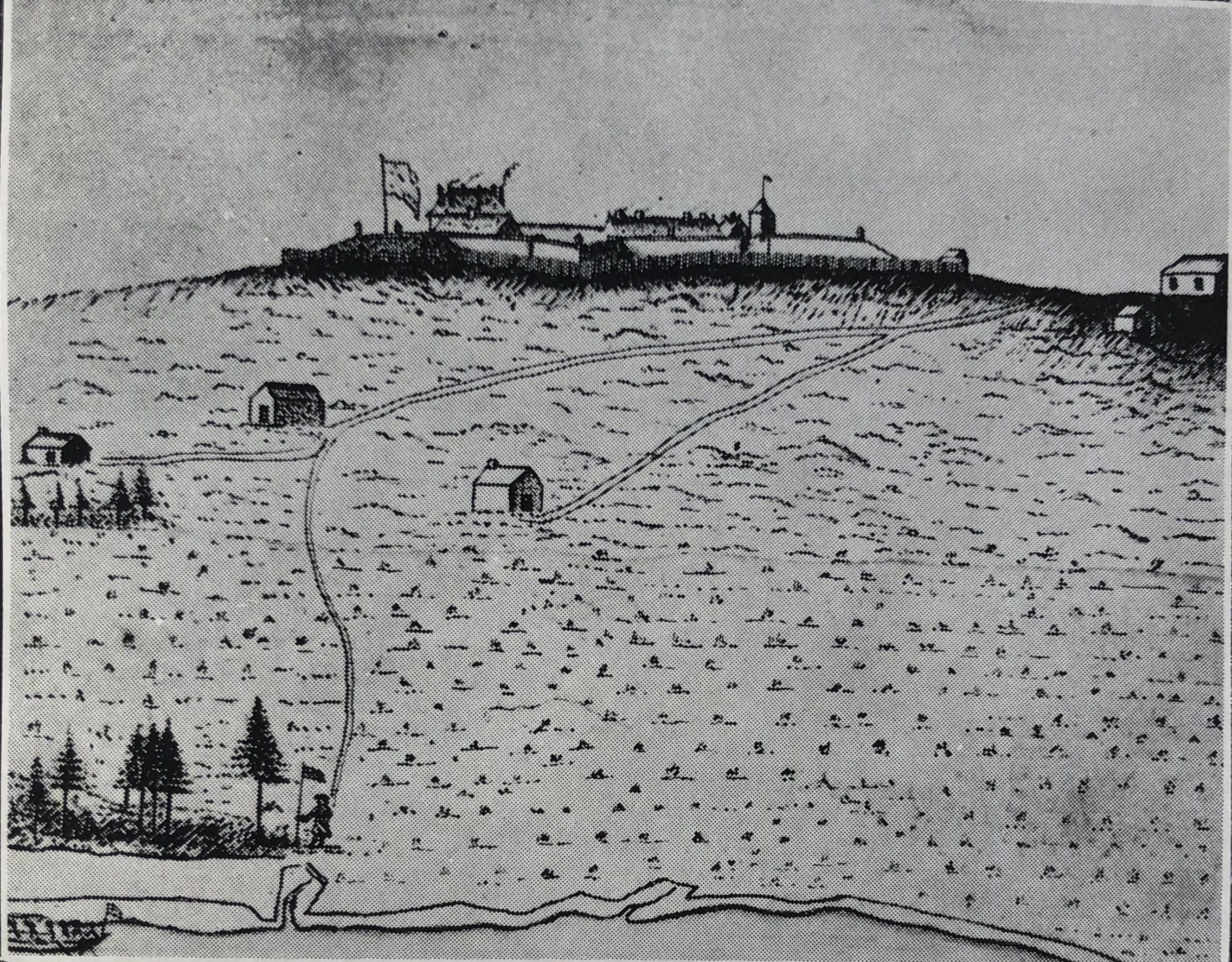
Fort Beauséeour in 1755 by Winckworth Tonge

During the 1600s and 1700s, European monarchies were nearly continuously at war with each other. The threat of Anglo-American invasion of New France was constant, as England tried to establish power in North America, and Acadia was particularly vulnerable to attacks by water. Its capital, Port-Royal, was founded in 1605, destroyed by the British in 1613, moved upstream in 1632, besieged by the British in 1707, and finally taken in the Siege of Port Royal (1710).

Under the terms of the 1713 Treaty of Utrecht, the Kingdom of France had ceded to the Kingdom of Great Britain the territory known today as mainland Nova Scotia. The treaty stated that France retained control of Île Royale (now Cape Breton Island) and Île Saint-Jean (Prince Edward Island). France's colony of Canada, or New France, extended from the Gaspé Peninsula in the east to Quebec in the west. The treaty of Utrecht defined neither which nation had sovereignty over the land between Gaspesie and Nova Scotia, now New Brunswick, nor the western border of Nova Scotia. The de facto border became the Isthmus of Chignecto at the Missiguash River, site of the prosperous Acadian settlement Beaubassin.

In the mid-1700s France and Britain were about to clash worldwide and in North America in the Seven Years' War. By the middle of the 1700s, over one million British colonists occupied a limited area along the Atlantic coast, but the primarily ethnic French population of what is now The Maritimes was 18,544, part of a total New France population of 70,000.

== Fort Beauséjour ==
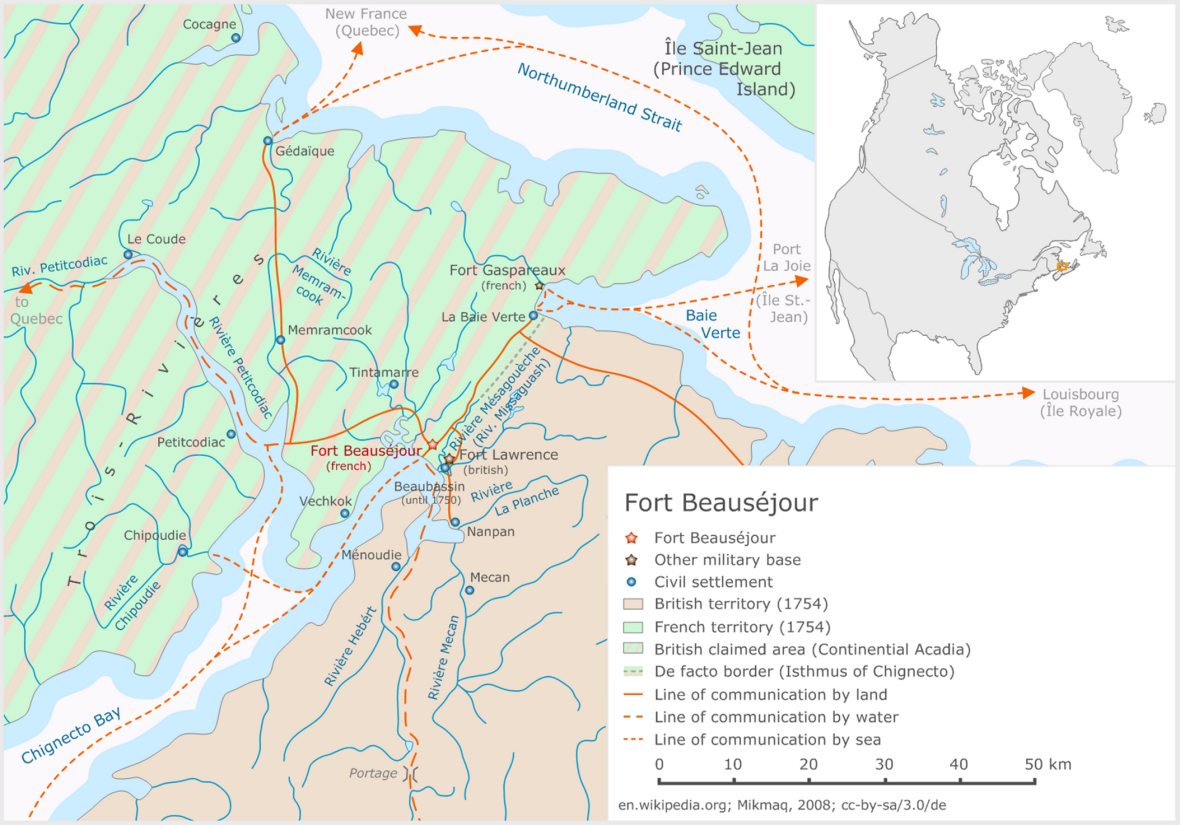
Map of surrounding area

As tensions escalated, in 1749 the British erected fortifications in Nova Scotia at Citadel Hill, Halifax, which they founded as a town; and at Fort Sackville, Bedford. The French rebuilt the Fortress of Louisbourg, and re-occupied Fort Nerepis as part of their defences.

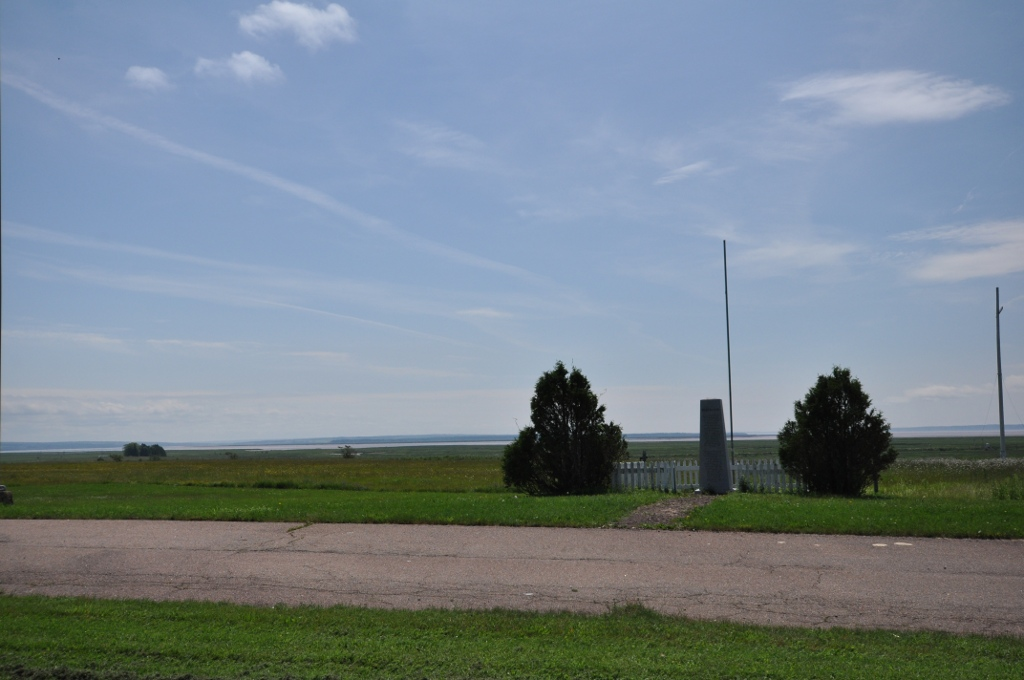
Marker at the site of Beaubassin

In 1750 the French added to the military personnel in their colony. In April of that year Governor Edward Cornwallis of Nova Scotia sent British Major Charles Lawrence with a small force to establish British authority in the isthmus of Chignecto. On the north bank of the Missaguash River, Lawrence found French forces under Louis de La Corne, who had orders to prevent any British advance beyond that point. De La Corne evacuated and burned the village of Beaubassin to prevent its aiding the British. Rather than fight the French, with whom the British were not at war, or admit to any territorial limitation, Lawrence withdrew.

Officials in London disagreed about how far to direct actions of troops in establishing national claims during a time of peace. But Cornwallis eventually sent Lawrence to the Missaguash River with a stronger force and they routed a group of Abenaki and allied Indians led by Father Le Loutre, a French agent provocateur. In the autumn of 1750 Lawrence built Fort Lawrence near the site of the ruined village of Beaubassin.

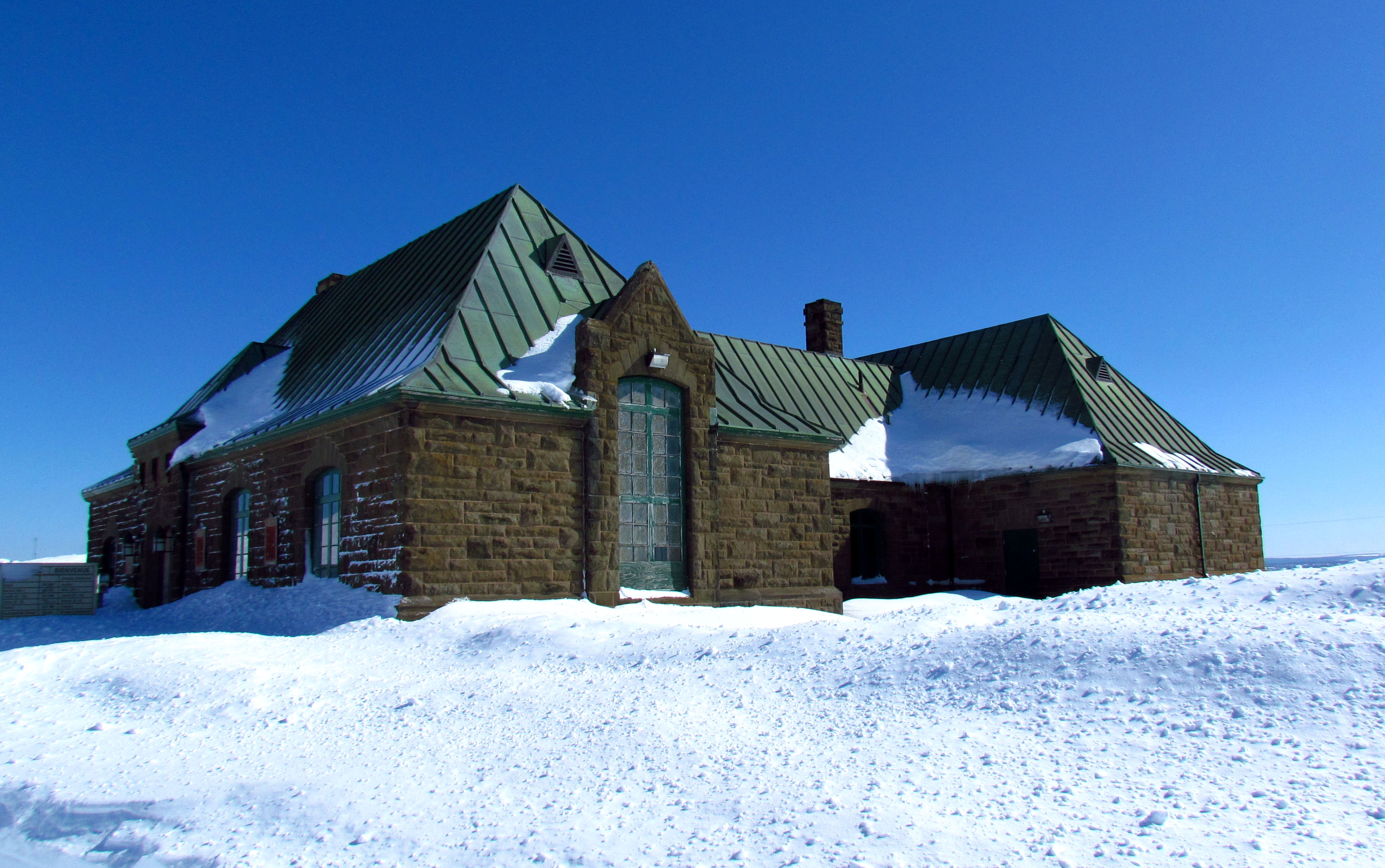
Modern museum at the site of Fort Beausejour

In November 1750 Governor General de la Jonquière ordered that two forts be built at either end of the Isthmus of Chignecto to block the British: one was Fort Gaspareaux on the Northumberland Strait and the other Fort Beauséjour on the Bay of Fundy.

Construction began in April 1751 under the direction of Lieutenant Gaspard-Joseph Chaussegros de Léry. By 1751 the gunpowder magazine, a well, four casemates, and officers' quarters were finished. The barracks were added the following year. By 1753 the fort had palisade walls and a five-metre-high (16 ft) earthwork. It was a pentagon-shaped fort with bastions built of earth and pickets at the corners.

In 1754, Louis Du Pont Duchambon de Vergor became the commander of Fort Beausejour. Events eventually revealed that he was unfit for military command. Louis-Léonard Aumasson de Courville, who became Vergor's secretary at Beauséjour claimed that Vergor was "avaricious in the extreme," and in his memoirs is a quotation attributed to François Bigot: "Profit, my dear Vergor, by your opportunity [at Beauséjour]; trim, – cut – you have the power – in order that you may soon join me in France and purchase an estate near me."

== Battle of Fort Beauséjour ==
The French position may have been undermined by Thomas Pichon, a clerk at the fort. The British commandant at Fort Lawrence paid Pichon for information about French activities. Pichon provided accounts of French activities, plans of forts and an outline of the steps necessary for capture, which Lieutenant-Colonel Robert Monckton later used in the attacks. Pichon delayed the strengthening of Beauséjour by advising that the British would not attack that year.

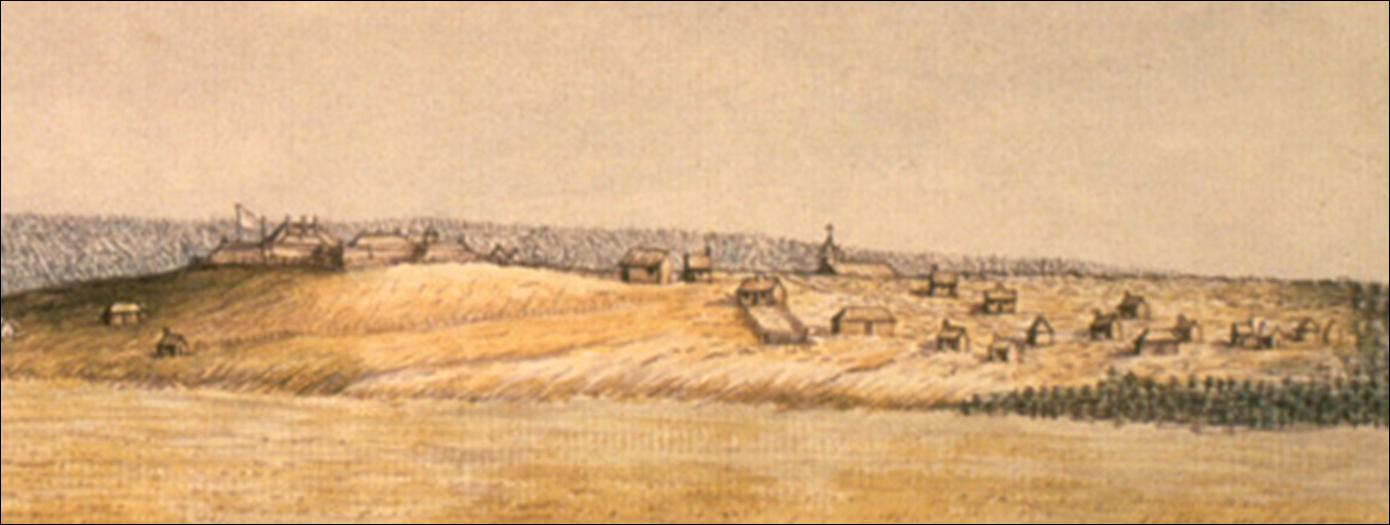
Fort Beauséjour and cathedral by John Hamilton (1755)

A convoy of 31 transports and three warships left Boston on 19 May 1755, carrying nearly 2,000 New England provincial troops and 270 British regulars, and dropped anchor near the mouth of the Missaguash River on 2 June. The next day the troops, under the command of Lieutenant-Colonel Robert Monckton of the regular army, disembarked a few kilometres from Fort Beauséjour. To defend the fort, Commander Louis Du Pont Duchambon de Vergor had only 150 soldiers from the Compagnies franches de la Marine and a dozen canonniers-bombardiers. On June 16, a large English bomb went through the roof of a casemate and killed many of its occupants. Vergor laid down his weapons. The fort was surrendered, and renamed Fort Cumberland. The next day Fort Gaspereau was surrendered without being attacked. The fall of these forts settled the boundary dispute in favour of the British and marked the beginning of the Expulsion of the Acadians.

The minister of Marine, Machault, had good reason to believe the forts had been "very ill defended" and Vergor was summoned before a court martial at Quebec in September 1757 but was acquitted.

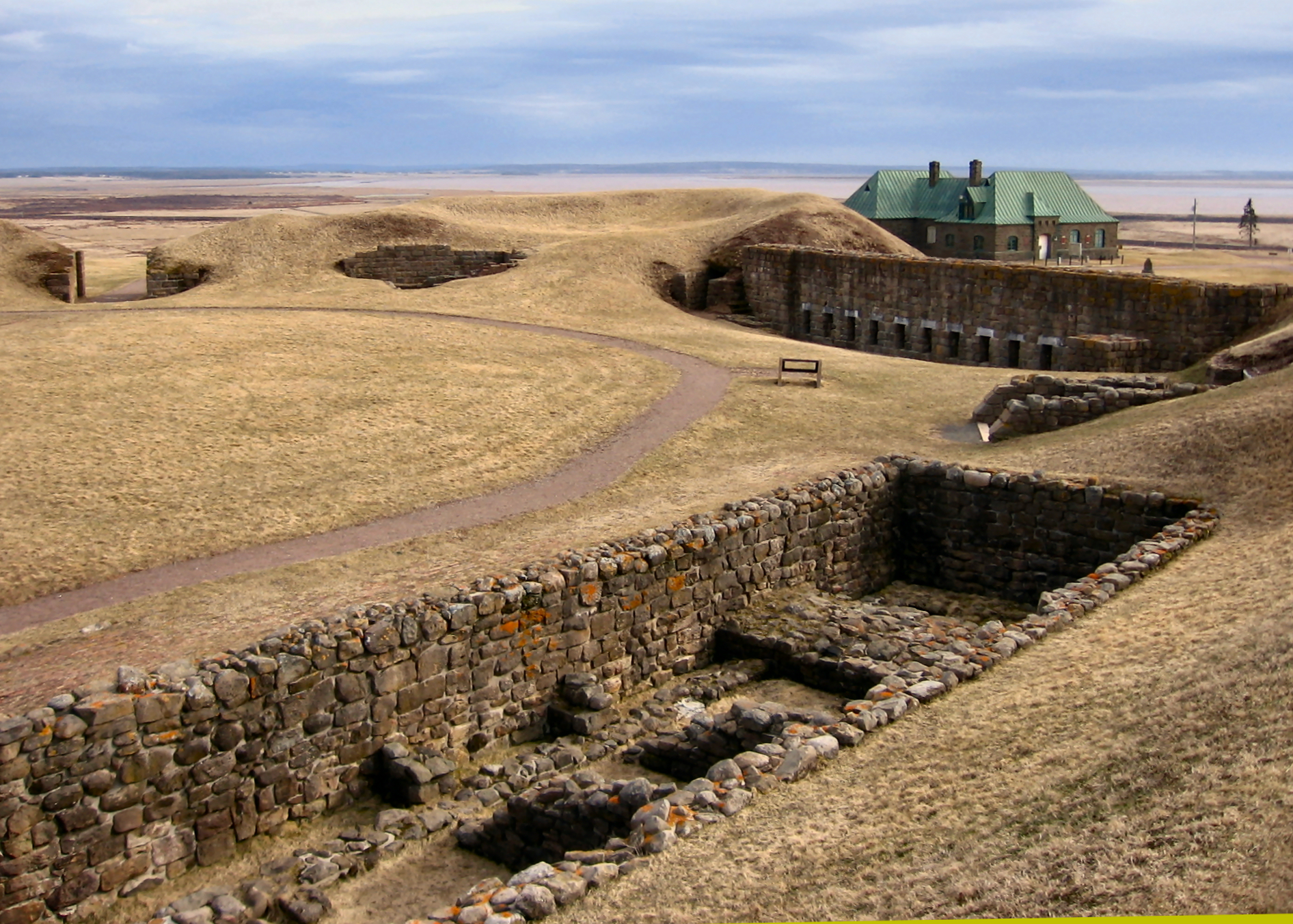
Ruins of Fort Beauséjour

== Fort Cumberland ==
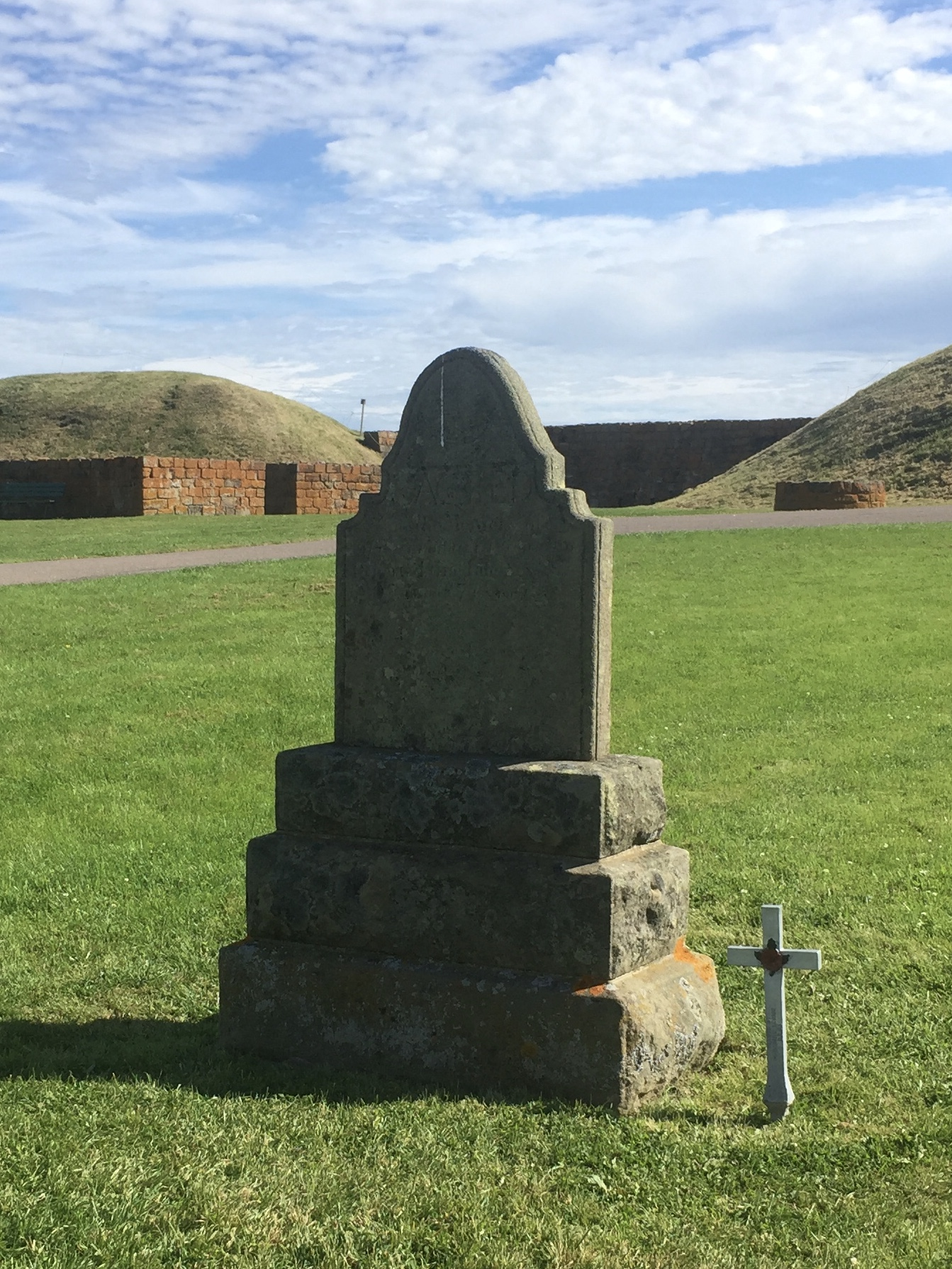
Thomas Dixson Grave at Fort Cumberland

In the months following the fort's capture, British forces ordered Acadians living in the region to sign an oath of allegiance to the British Crown. However, the Acadians refused, preferring to remain neutral. Some Acadians reported that they had been coerced into assisting in the defense of Fort Beauséjour, and the British used this as a reason to begin the Expulsion of the Acadians. Acadian homes were burnt to prevent their return. As the British army had relocated to Fort Cumberland, they abandoned and burned Fort Lawrence in October 1756. Fort Cumberland became one of the sites in which the British imprisoned or temporarily held Acadians during the nine years of the expulsion, the others being Fort Edward (Nova Scotia); Fort Frederick, Saint John, New Brunswick, and Fort Charlotte, Georges Island, Halifax.

Under the leadership of French officer Boishébert, Acadians and Mi'kmaq fought the expulsion from their homeland. In the early spring of 1756, a band of Acadian and Mi'kmaq partisans ambushed a small party of New England soldiers' cutting wood for Fort Cumberland, killing and mutilating nine men. In April 1757, after raiding Fort Edward, a band of Acadian and Mi'kmaq partisans also raided Fort Cumberland, killing and scalping two men and taking two prisoners. In July, Mi'kmaq captured two of Gorham's rangers outside Fort Cumberland. In March 1758, forty Acadian and Mi'kmaq attacked a schooner at Fort Cumberland and killed its master and two sailors. In the winter of 1759, five British soldiers on patrol were ambushed while crossing a bridge near Fort Cumberland. They were scalped and their bodies were mutilated as was common in frontier warfare. In October 1761, commander of the fort Roderick McKenzie of the Montgomery's Highlanders went to Bay of Chaleurs to remove the 787 Acadians. He captured 335.

In 1776, early in the American Revolutionary War, Fort Cumberland and its garrison of the Royal Fencible American Regiment repelled several rebel attacks in the Battle of Fort Cumberland. These were mounted by local guerrillas led by the American sympathizer Jonathan Eddy.

After the end of the Revolutionary War, by which the United States gained independence, the British abandoned Fort Cumberland in the late 1780s. When territorial conflict with the United States resumed in the War of 1812, Britain sent forces to refurbish the fort and garrison it. It was not the site of any action in that war. In 1835 the British military declared the fort surplus property and it was abandoned.

== National Historic Site ==
In 1920 the fort was designated as a National Historic Site of Canada for its significance to French and British history in the country. It is named the Fort Beauséjour – Fort Cumberland National Historic Site. Portions of the fort have been restored. In addition, a museum and visitor facilities have been constructed.

The museum depicts and interprets the conflicts between France and Great Britain in the 1700s, and the later struggle between rebels of the Thirteen Colonies and Britain. Attracting about 6000 visitors each year, the fort contributes to heritage tourism in the Maritimes.

== Commanders ==
- Louis de la Corne, Chevalier de la Corne (1749–1750) – established pickets
- Pierre-Roch of Saint-Ours D'Eschallions (1750–1751)
- Jean-Baptiste Mutigny de Vassan (1751–1753)
- Louis Du Pont Duchambon de Vergor (1754)

== See also ==
- List of French forts in North America
- Military history of Nova Scotia
