= Isthmus of Chignecto =

Land strip connecting the Canadian provinces of New Brunswick and Nova Scotia

Coordinates: 45°54′59″N 64°08′32″W

Isthmus of Chignecto

The Isthmus of Chignecto is an isthmus bordering the Maritime provinces of New Brunswick and Nova Scotia that connects the Nova Scotia peninsula with the rest of North America.

The isthmus separates the waters of Chignecto Bay, a sub-basin of the Bay of Fundy, from those of Baie Verte, a sub-basin of the Northumberland Strait that is an arm of the Gulf of St. Lawrence. The isthmus stretches from its northerly point at an area in the Petitcodiac River valley near the city of Dieppe, New Brunswick to its southerly point at an area near the town of Amherst, Nova Scotia. At its narrowest point between Amherst and Tidnish, the isthmus measures 24 kilometres (15 mi) wide. Because of its strategic position, it has been important to competing forces through much of its history of occupation.

The name Chignecto derives from the Mi'kmaq name Siknikt, meaning 'drainage place'. Siknikt, also known as Signigtewa'gi, is one of the seven (or eight) districts of the Mi'kmaw homeland: Mi'kma'ki, covering regions in southern and eastern New Brunswick as well as in Nova Scotia around the isthmus.

== Geography ==
The majority of the lands comprising the isthmus have low elevation above sea level; a large portion comprises the Tantramar Marshes, as well as tidal rivers, mud flats, inland freshwater marshes, coastal saltwater marshes, and mixed forest. Several prominent ridges rise above the surrounding low land and marshes along the Bay of Fundy shore, namely the Fort Lawrence Ridge (in Nova Scotia), the Aulac Ridge, the Sackville Ridge, and the Memramcook Ridge (in New Brunswick).

In contrast to the Bay of Fundy shoreline in the west, the Northumberland Strait shoreline in the east is largely forested, with serpentine tidal estuaries such as the Tidnish River penetrating inland. The narrowest point on the Northumberland shoreline is opposite the Cumberland Basin at Baie Verte. If sea levels were to rise by 12 metres (40 feet), the isthmus would be flooded, effectively making mainland Nova Scotia an island.

== Transportation ==
As the Isthmus of Chignecto was a key surface transportation route since the 17th century, French and later British colonists built military roads across it to the Tantramar Marshes and along the strategic ridges.

In 1872, the Intercolonial Railway of Canada constructed a mainline between Halifax, Nova Scotia and Moncton, New Brunswick across the southern portion of the isthmus. It skirted the edge of the Bay of Fundy while crossing the Tantramar Marshes between Amherst, Nova Scotia and Sackville, New Brunswick.

In 1886 a railway line was built from Sackville across the isthmus to Port Elgin and on to Cape Tormentine. The latter was a port for the iceboat service. In 1917 Canadian National Railways established a rail ferry service to Prince Edward Island to connect with the Prince Edward Island Railway.

In the mid-1880s, the isthmus was also the site of one of Canada's earliest mega-projects: construction of a broad-gauge railway from the port of Amherst to the Northumberland Strait at Tidnish for carrying small cargo and passenger ships. This ship railway was never successfully operational, and construction was abandoned shortly before completion.

In the 1950s, while construction of the St. Lawrence Seaway was underway, a group of industrialists and politicians from the Maritimes called for a Chignecto Canal to be built as a shortcut for ocean-going ships travelling between Saint John and U.S. ports to the Great Lakes to avoid travelling around Nova Scotia. The project, while endorsed by both the second Flemming government of New Brunswick and the Robichaud government that succeeded it, never progressed beyond the survey stage.

In the early 1960s, the Trans-Canada Highway was built on the isthmus to connect with Nova Scotia and Prince Edward Island. Route 2 in New Brunswick and Highway 104 in Nova Scotia were built parallel to the existing Canadian National Railway trackage; this inter-provincial highway was upgraded to a 4-lane expressway in the 1990s. Route 16 in New Brunswick was built from an interchange with Route 2 in Aulac to the ferry terminal at Cape Tormentine. This was subsequently modified in 1997 to connect with the Confederation Bridge at Cape Jourimain.

== Flooding ==
The Isthmus is at risk of flooding if the dikes holding back the ocean were to fail. As of right now the dikes are vulnerable to 50 year storms, and this will only get worse due to climate change and erosion Plans have been made to protect the isthmus, with the Canadian government offering to pay half of the 650 million dollar cost to reinforce the dikes. This offer required the provincial governments of New Brunswick and Nova Scotia being required to pay 162.5 million dollars Nova Scotia and New Brunswick claimed the federal government should pay the full cost and have taken the issue to court.

The issue stems from the debate as to whether the project is of national importance, or disaster mitigation and adaptation. If the project is disaster mitigation and adaptation the maximum the federal government can pay is half the cost, but if the project is of national importance the federal government pays all. Furthermore, the federal government paid the entire cost of the 4 billion dollar Champlain Bridge in Montreal.

== History ==
The first European settlements on the isthmus were French. The isthmus was the location of a growing Acadian farming community called Beaubassin. The isthmus became in 1713 the site of the historic dividing line between the British colony of Nova Scotia and the French territory. French military forces established Fort Beauséjour on the Aulac Ridge in 1749 in response to the British construction of an outpost called Fort Lawrence on the ridge immediately to the east.

Between the two ridges was a tidal stream called the Missaquash River, which France generally accepted to be the boundary between the territories. The powers had never determined and agreed to an official boundary. France also constructed Fort Gaspereau on the shores of the Northumberland Strait to effectively control travel on the isthmus.

=== King William's War ===
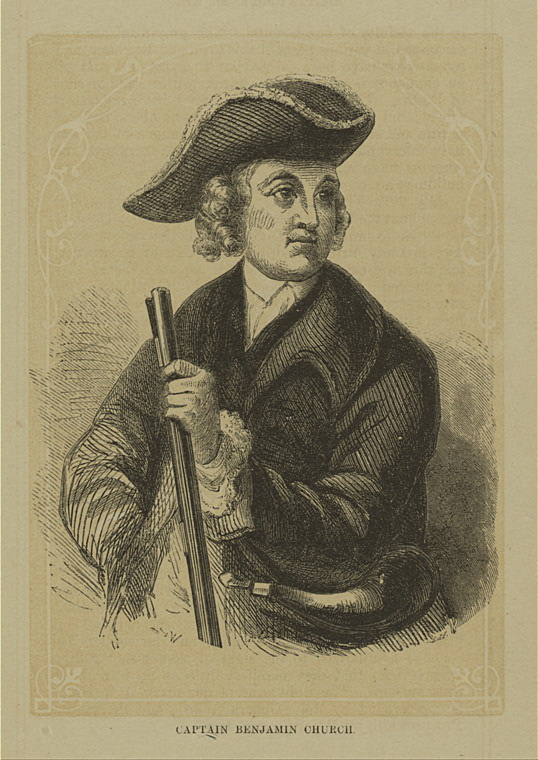
Benjamin Church: Father of American ranging

Raid on Chignecto (1696)

During King William's War, the first of the four French and Indian Wars, the English colonial militia leader Benjamin Church led a devastating raid on the Isthmus of Chignecto at Beaubassin, in retaliation for an earlier French and native raid against Pemaquid, Maine (present day Bristol, Maine) earlier that year. Church and four hundred men (50 to 150 of whom were Indians, likely Iroquois) arrived offshore of Beaubassin on September 20. They managed to get ashore and surprise the Acadians. Many fled while one confronted Church with papers showing they had signed an oath of allegiance in 1690 to the English king.

Church was unconvinced. He burned a number of buildings, killed inhabitants, looted their household goods, and slaughtered their livestock. Governor Villebon reported that

the English stayed at Beaubassin nine whole days without drawing any supplies from their vessels, and even those settlers to whom they had shown a pretence of mercy were left with empty houses and barns and nothing else except the clothes on their backs.

=== Queen Anne's War ===
Raid on Chignecto (1704)

Major Church returned to Acadia during Queen Anne's War, in retaliation for the French and their Abenaki allies' sorties during the Northeast Coast Campaign (1703) and the Raid on Deerfield, Massachusetts. They killed many English colonists at Deerfield and took more than 100 captive. The captives were mostly women and children; they were forced on an overland march from western Massachusetts to Montreal. Some were held by the Indians for ransom, as raiding was active on both sides. Others were adopted by Mohawk families at the Catholic village south of the French city. Some adults, such as the minister of Deerfield, were redeemed by their communities or families paying ransom, but the process sometimes took years. His daughter Emily, adopted when a young teenager, never returned to live with her English family, as she married a Mohawk man and had a family with him.

On July 17, 1704, Church raided Chignecto. The Acadian settlers returned some gunfire but quickly sought shelter in the woods. Church burned 40 empty houses and killed more than 200 cattle and other livestock.

On this campaign against Acadia, Church also raided Castine, Maine, Grand Pré, and Pisiguit (present-day Windsor/Falmouth).

The British took control of present-day mainland Nova Scotia under the Treaty of Utrecht (1713), and Beaubassin became part of British territory.

=== King George's War ===
During King George's War, the French used Chignecto as the staging area for their raids on British Nova Scotia. It was the gathering place for De Ramezay prior to the Siege of Annapolis Royal (1744). Chignecto was also the base of Nicolas Antoine II Coulon de Villiers prior to the Battle of Grand Pre (1747).

=== Father Le Loutre's War ===
Battle at Chignecto (1749)

During Father Le Loutre's War, conflict in Acadia continued. On September 18, 1749, several Mi'kmaq and Maliseet killed three Englishmen at Chignecto. Seven natives were also killed in the skirmish.

Battle at Chignecto (1750)

In May 1750, Lawrence was unsuccessful in getting a base at Chignecto because Le Loutre burned the village of Beaubassin, preventing Lawrence from using its supplies to establish a fort. (According to the historian Frank Patterson, the Acadians at Cobequid also burned their homes as they retreated from the British to Tatamagouche, Nova Scotia in 1754.) Lawrence retreated, but he returned in September 1750.

On September 3, Rous, Lawrence and Gorham led over 700 men to Chignecto, where Mi’kmaq and Acadians opposed their landing. They killed twenty British, who in turn killed several Mi’kmaq. Le Loutre's militia eventually withdrew, burning the rest of the Acadians' crops and houses as they went. Le Loutre and the Acadian militia leader Joseph Broussard resisted the British assault. The British troops defeated the resistance and began construction of Fort Lawrence near the site of the ruins of Beaubassin. The work on the fort proceeded rapidly and they completed the facility within weeks. To limit the British to peninsular Nova Scotia, the French also began to fortify the Chignecto and its approaches; they constructed Fort Beauséjour and two satellite forts: one at present-day Strait Shores, New Brunswick (Fort Gaspareaux) and the other at present-day Saint John, New Brunswick (Fort Menagoueche).

During these months, 35 Mi'kmaq and Acadians ambushed Ranger Captain Francis Bartelo, killing him and six of his men while taking seven others captive. The Mi'kmaq conducted ritual torture of the captives throughout the night, which had a chilling effect on the New Englanders.

Raid on Chignecto (1751)

The British retaliated for the Raid on Dartmouth (1751) by sending several armed companies to Chignecto. They killed a few French defenders and breached the dikes, allowing the low lands to flood. Hundreds of acres of crops were ruined, which was disastrous for the Acadians and the French troops. In the summer of 1752, Father Le Loutre went to Quebec and then on to France to raise funds and supplies to re-build the dikes. He returned in the spring of 1753.

In May 1753, Natives scalped two British soldiers at Fort Lawrence.

=== Seven Years' War ===
Battle of Fort Beauséjour (1755)

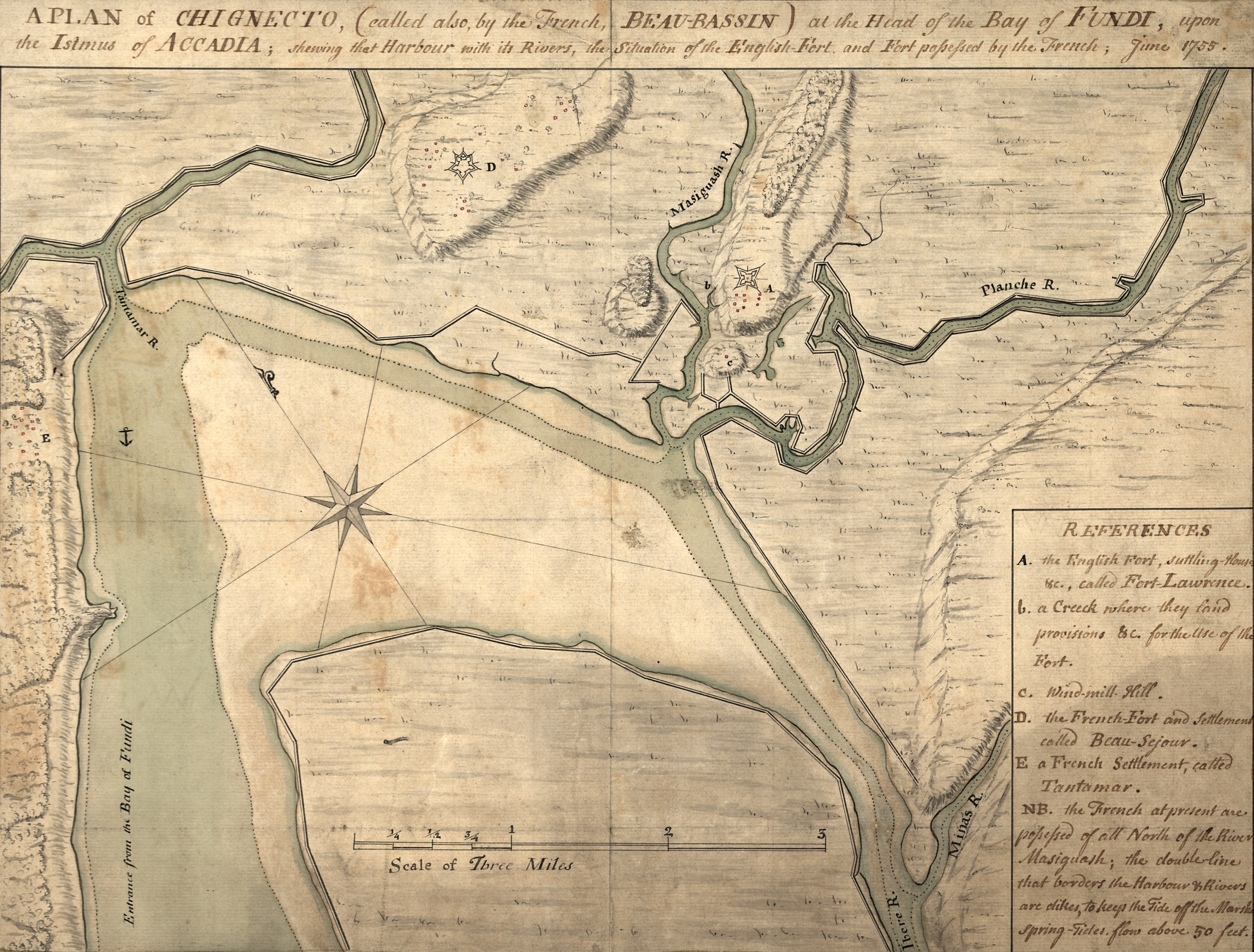
Map of Chignecto (1755)

A British fleet of three warships and thirty-three transports, carrying 2,100 soldiers from Boston, Massachusetts, landed at Fort Lawrence on June 3, 1755. They attacked Fort Beauséjour the following day. The French forces abandoned Fort Gaspareaux on June 16, 1755, choosing instead to re-garrison at Fortress Louisbourg. This battle proved to be one of the key victories for the British in the Seven Years' War, in which Great Britain gained control of all of New France and Acadia.

On the isthmus, the British abandoned Fort Lawrence and took over the better-constructed Fort Beauséjour, which they renamed Fort Cumberland. Shortly afterwards, the Great Upheaval began when British forces started rounding up French settlers during the Bay of Fundy Campaign (1755). Most of these settlers would be deported, with their villages burned behind them to prevent their return.

Skirmish at Chignecto (1755 July)

During the Seven Years' War, at Fort Moncton (formerly Fort Gaspareaux), one of Captain Silvaus Cobb's soldiers was shot from his horse and killed in an ambush. Cobb assembled 100 troops but was unable to catch the Mi’kmaq. Monckton dispatched 200 men from Fort Lawrence but was also unsuccessful in catching any Mi’kmaq.

Raid on Chignecto (1755 September)

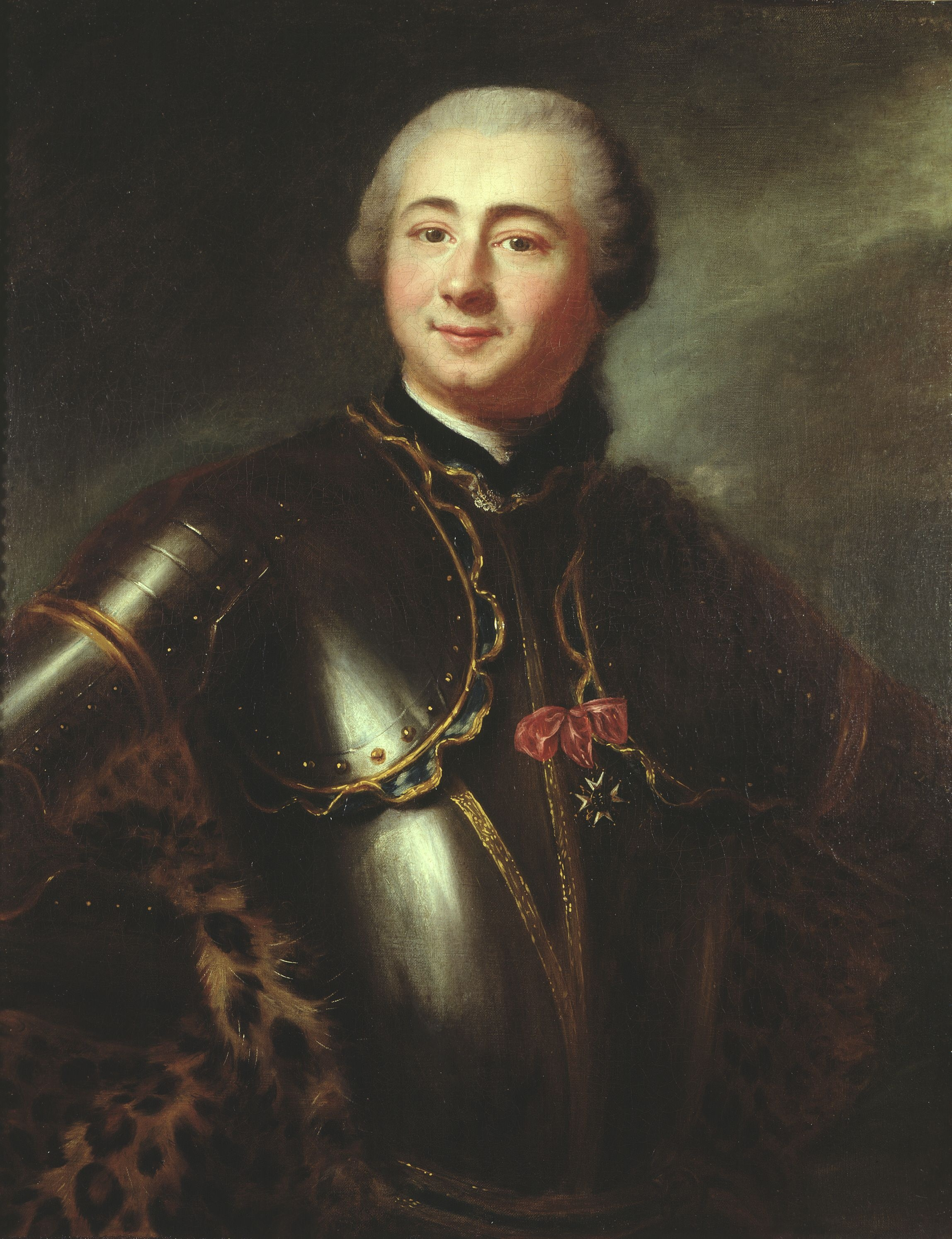
Marquis de Boishébert - Charles Deschamps de Boishébert et de Raffetot (1753)

On September 15, Majors Jedidiah Preble and Benjamin Coldthwait took 400 men to destroy an Acadian village a short distance outside of Fort Monckton.

Raid on Chignecto (1756 January)

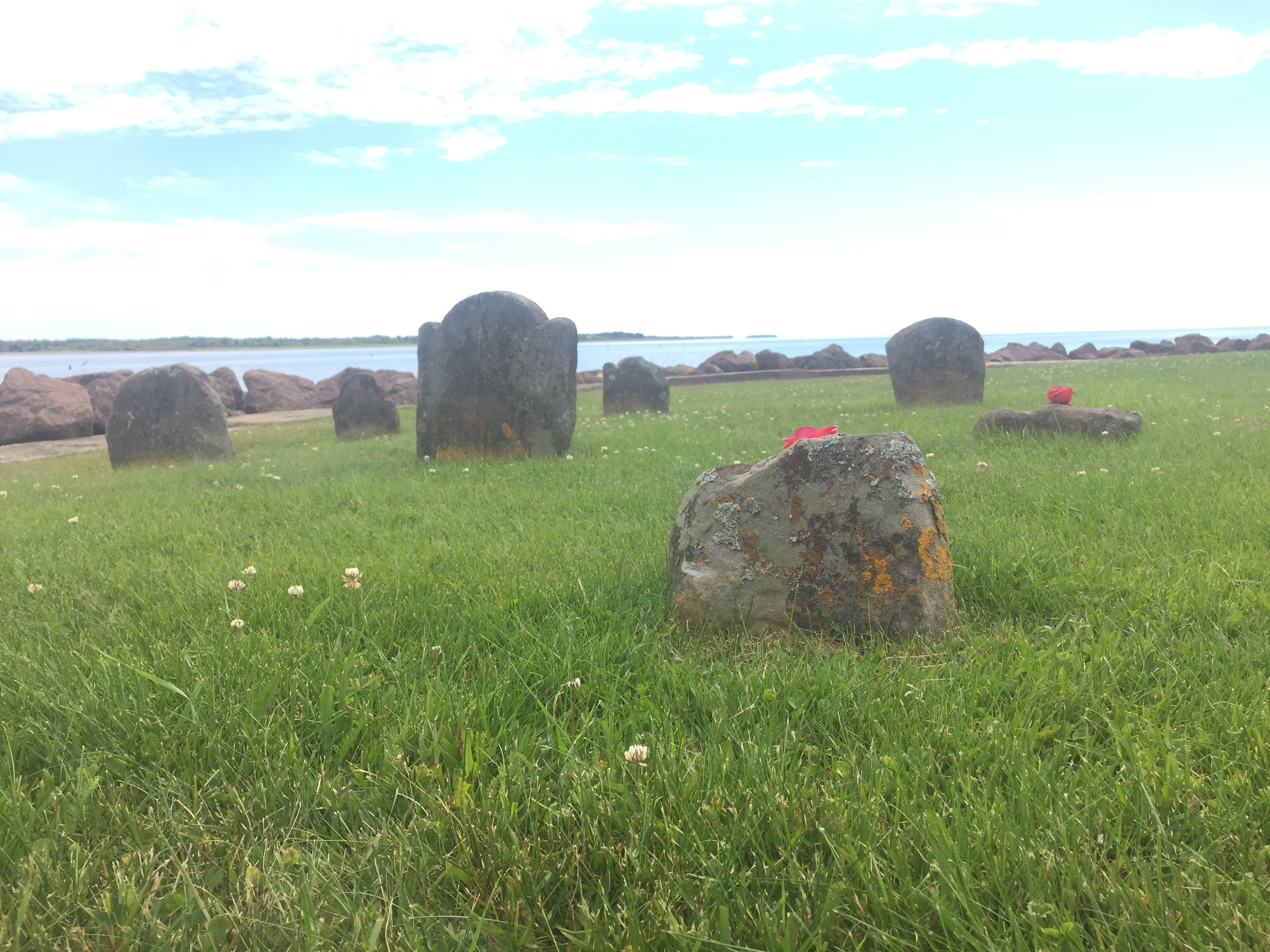
British Gravestones from the Mi'kmaw Raid on Fort Monckton (1756) - oldest known military gravestones in the Maritimes

On January 20, Boishébert sent François Boucher de Niverville to Baie Verte to burn a British schooner. Niverville killed seven soldiers and took one prisoner before burning the ship. Meanwhile, Boishébert and his 120 Acadians and Mi’kmaq tried to set up a siege of Fort Cumberland, but ended up escaping capture in a possible ambush.

Raid on Chignecto (1756 April)

The Mi'kmaq and Acadians attacked Fort Cumberland on April 26, 1756. During the following two days, nine British soldiers were killed and scalped.

Raid on Chignecto (1756 October)

When Boishébert moved against Fort Monckton, the British abandoned it and burned it to the ground so that it could not be used by the French.

Skirmish at Chignecto (1757 July)

On July 20, 1757, Mi’kmaq captured two of Gorham's rangers outside Fort Cumberland.

Skirmish at Chignecto (1757 September)

On September 6, Monckton directed Lt. Colonel Hunt Walsh to take the 28th regiment and a company of rangers to Baie Verte to burn what was left of it. When they arrived, it was already vacated.

==== Yorkshire emigration ====
In 1758 Governor Lawrence issued a proclamation inviting New Englanders to come to Nova Scotia, settle on vacated Acadian lands, and take up free land grants. He also extended the invitation to New England soldiers serving in Canada whose enlistments had expired and who were planning on returning home. Such settlers became known as the New England Planters. Following the end of the Seven Years' War in 1763, the British created three 100,000-acre (400 km^{2}) townships on the isthmus: Amherst, Sackville and Cumberland, which would later be dissolved into Cumberland County.

The drive to attract settlers from New England was not immediately successful. After a few small groups arrived in 1760 and 1761, some families returned home, and the British government decided to look elsewhere for settlers. Between 1772 and 1775, more than 20 ships arrived from England, carrying upwards of 1,000 settlers from Yorkshire to the new townships. The descendants of the Yorkshire emigration continue to be prominent in the area's development and history.

=== American Revolutionary War ===
Battle of Fort Cumberland ("Eddy Rebellion")

In October and November 1776, local guerrilla and colonial American forces led by Jonathan Eddy and John Allan attempted to take over Fort Cumberland and the Tantramar region. Eddy's attacking force consisted of "about twenty" Americans from Machias, Maine, 27 Yankee settlers from the Saint John River valley, 140 Malisseet and four Mi'kmaq, 21 Acadians from the Memramcook Valley and the Allen family farm, and about 120 farmers from Cumberland, Onslow, and Pictou. Eddy had insufficient forces to capture the fort in a direct assault so he besieged the fort instead. Rebel sympathizers from Sackville burned some surrounding buildings. After three weeks, British forces dispatched from Halifax and Windsor routed the invaders.

The British burned eight of the rebel Acadians' houses and barns at Inverma Farm, Jolicoeur. With winter coming rapidly, the Acadians were forced to relocate with their families to Memramcook. Eddy, Allan and many of the other English-speaking rebels were also expelled from Nova Scotia, but the American colonial government rewarded their efforts with land grants in Maine and Ohio.

== Bibliography ==
- Bernard Pothier, Battle for the Chignecto Forts, 1995, Toronto: Balimuir.
- Dr. John Clarence Webster, The Forts of Chignecto, 1930, self-published.
