= Aulac, New Brunswick =

Community in Westmorland County, New Brunswick, Canada

Coordinates: 45°52′15.5″N 64°16′44″W

Location of Aulac in New Brunswick

Aulac is a Canadian community in Westmorland County, New Brunswick. As of January 1, 2023 it is part of the Municipality of Tantramar which consists of the former town of Sackville, Village of Dorchester, Pointe de Bute and other rural communities . It is located between the former college town of Sackville and the provincial border with Nova Scotia.

== Geography ==
Aulac is situated upon the Aulac Ridge, a prominent rise running west–east across the Tantramar Marshes on the Isthmus of Chignecto, approximately 2 kilometres west of the Missaguash River which forms the southern part of the inter-provincial boundary with Nova Scotia.

== History ==
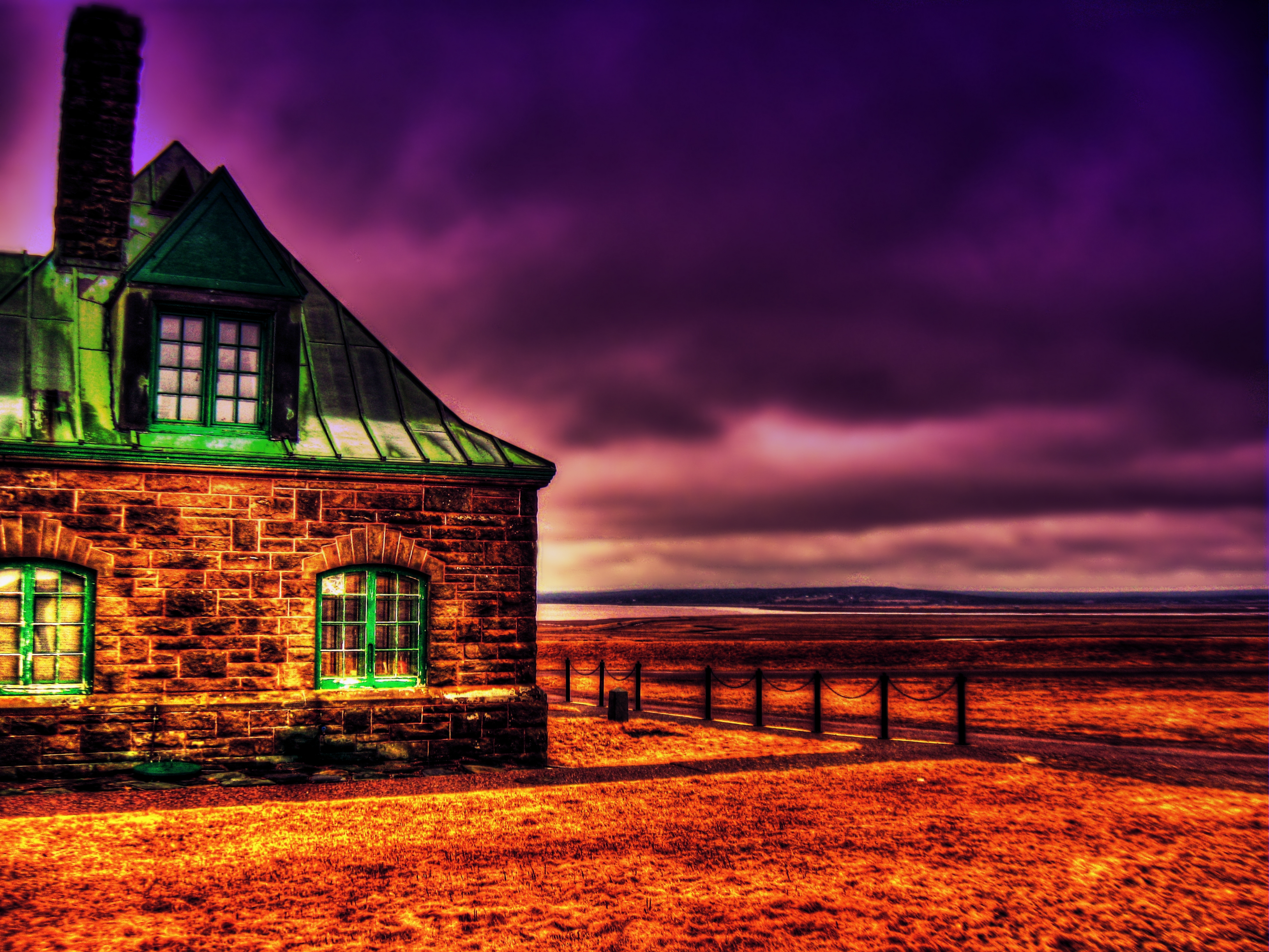
The Fort Beausejour Visitor Center overlooks the historically significant Tantramar Marsh at Aulac, New Brunswick

Aulac became strategically important for French military forces during the 18th century after ceding what is now peninsular Nova Scotia to Britain in the 1713 Treaty of Utrecht; the words describing the boundary of Acadia (then including all of Nova Scotia, New Brunswick, Cape Breton Island, Prince Edward Island, the Gaspé Peninsula, Anticosti Island and part of eastern Maine) were sufficiently vague as to permit France to establish the Missaguash River as the boundary between Britain's new colony and New France. During Father Le Loutre's War, British military forces constructed a log stockade on the Fort Lawrence Ridge, 3 km to the south of Aulac, naming their facility Fort Lawrence, which was promptly answered by the French construction of Fort Beauséjour at the western end of the Aulac Ridge, overlooking the Cumberland Basin of the Bay of Fundy.

After falling to Britain during the Seven Years' War, the Aulac area became part of the Tantramar farming district in the township of Sackville. The Intercolonial Railway constructed its mainline connecting Moncton, New Brunswick with Truro, Nova Scotia in 1872, with the railway line curving around the ridge below the fort.

In the 20th century, roads across the marshes passed up and over the Aulac Ridge, as did a road running the length of the ridge toward Strait Shores. These roads were upgraded in the 1960s as part of the Trans-Canada Highway project, with the Moncton-Amherst, Nova Scotia section being numbered Highway 2 and the Aulac-Strait Shores (and thence Cape Tormentine) section being numbered Highway 16.

== Present day ==
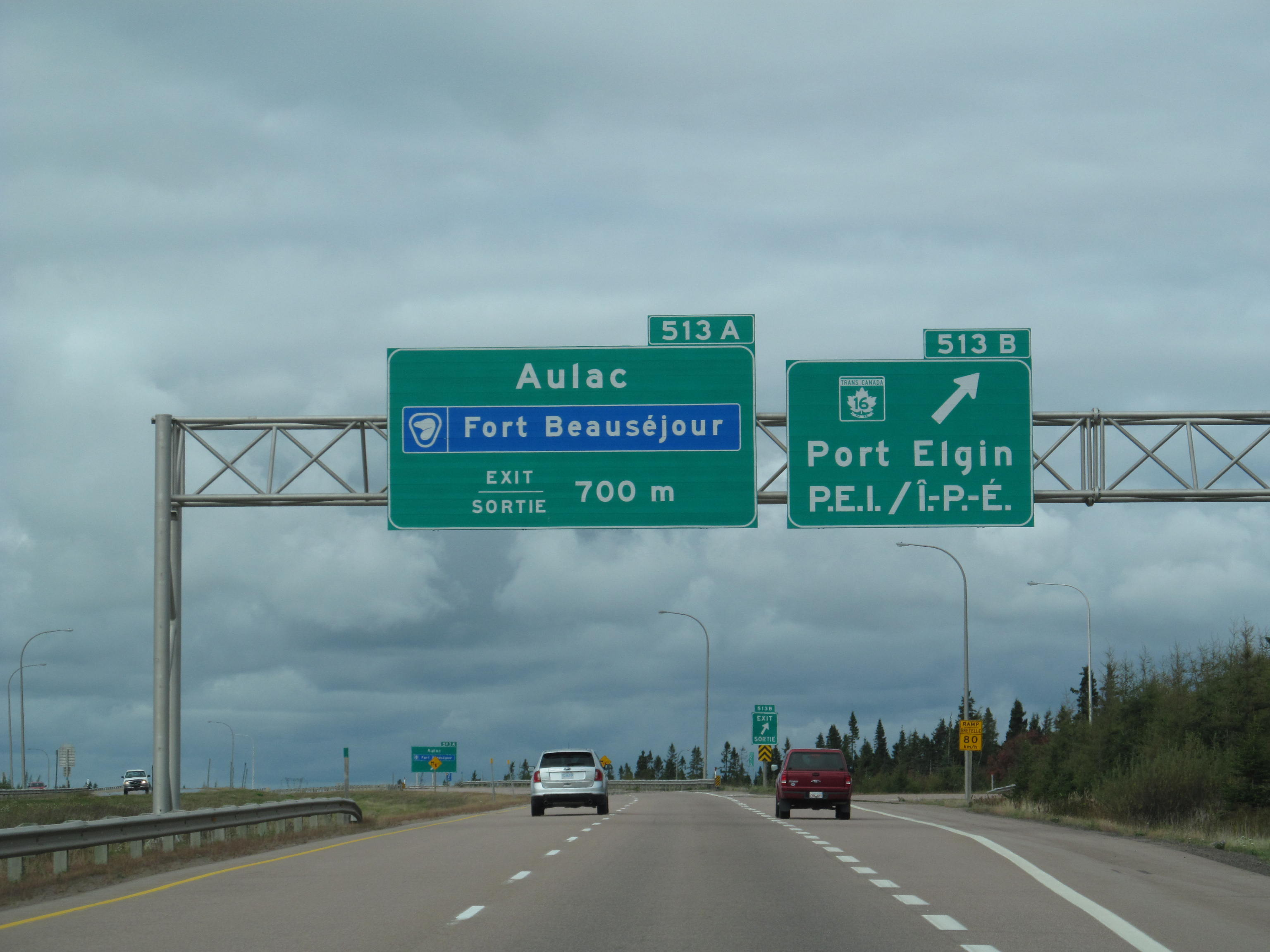
Highway signage at the Aulac exit

A cluster of highway service businesses established in Aulac, including a truck stop, several gas stations, motels and stores and the hamlet became a popular stopping point for highway travellers. During the 1990s, Aulac was bypassed when Highway 2 was upgraded on a new 4-lane alignment several hundred metres to the east. A truck stop, a motel, and several businesses remain.

The Trans Canada Highway (New Brunswick Route 2) and New Brunswick Route 16 intersect at Aulac. Most traffic heading for Prince Edward Island via the Confederation Bridge must use this interchange and virtually all traffic passing between New Brunswick and Nova Scotia also travels through this interchange. In 2012, there were about 14,000 vehicles per day passing along Route 2.

== See also ==
- List of communities in New Brunswick
