= Tantramar Marshes =

Tidal saltmarsh in Canada

Coordinates: 45°55′N 64°18′W

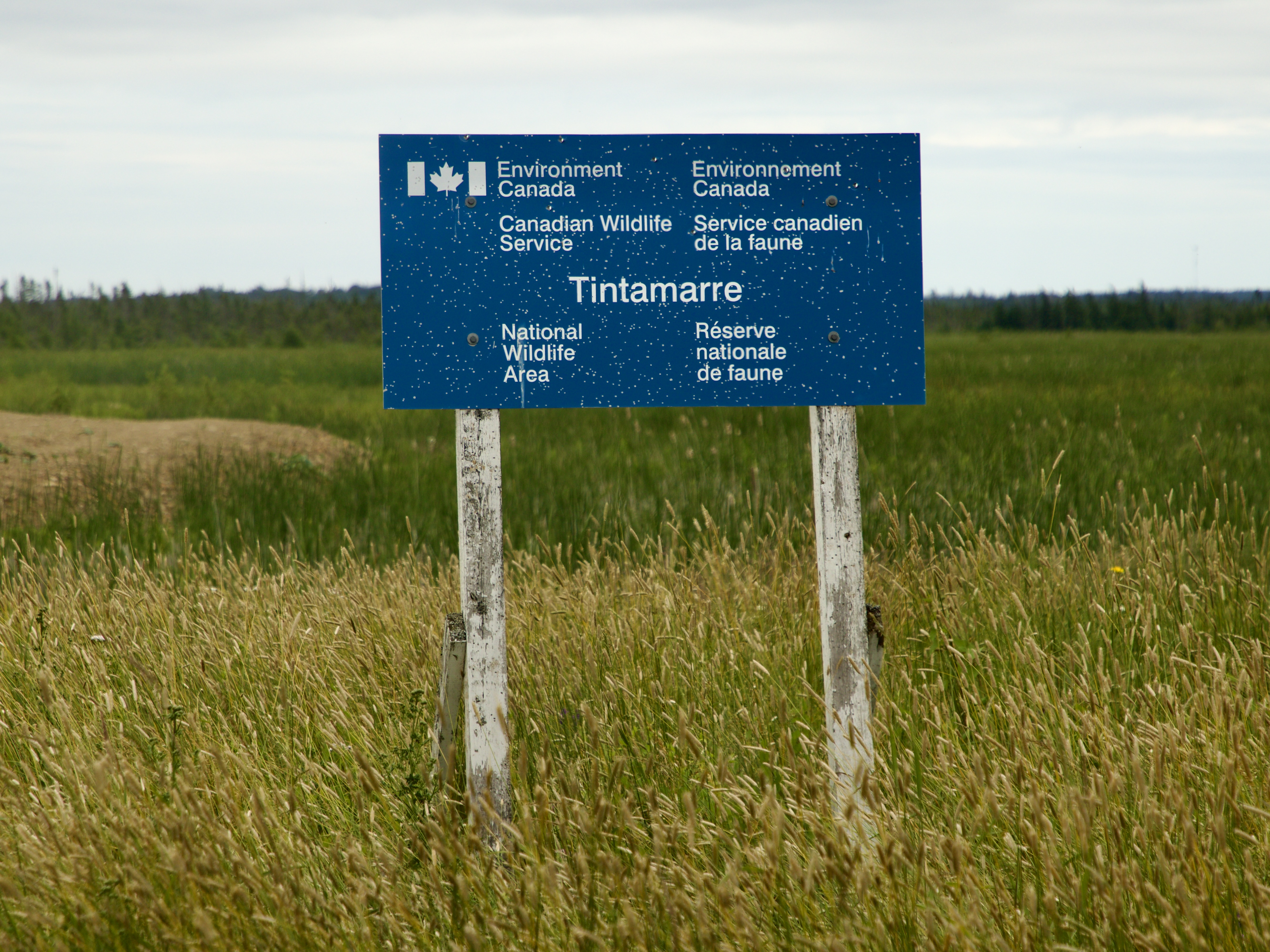
Sign for Tintamarre National Wildlife Area

The Tantramar Marshes, also known as the Tintamarre National Wildlife Area, is a tidal saltmarsh around the Bay of Fundy on the Isthmus of Chignecto. The area borders between Route 940, Route 16 and Route 2 near Tantramar, New Brunswick. The government of Canada proposed the boundaries of the Tantramar Marshes in 1966 and was declared a National Wildlife Area in 1978.

The marshes are an important stopover for migrating waterfowl such as semipalmated sandpipers and Canada geese. Now a National Wildlife Area, the marshes are the site of two bird sanctuaries.

The name Tantramar is derived from the Acadian French tintamarre, meaning 'din' or 'racket', a reference to the noisy flocks of birds which feed there.

The Mi'kmaq, an Indigenous nation, historically inhabited the surrounding areas of the Tantramar Marshes. Communities currently on or bordering the marshes include, in New Brunswick: Aulac and Sackville, and on the Nova Scotia side: Amherst, and Fort Lawrence.

The landscape of the Tantramar Marshes has provided subject matter for the poets Charles G.D. Roberts, Bliss Carman, Douglas Lochhead, Marilyn Lerch and Elizabeth Bishop, painter Alex Colville, and photographer Thaddeus Holownia.

== National wildlife area status ==
Map of protected areas in New Brunswick. Tintamarre National Wildlife Area is highlighted in dark red near the border of New Brunswick and Nova Scotia.

The boundaries of Tintamarre National Wildlife Area were proposed in 1966 for the National Habitat Protection Program, through the government of Canada. The land was acquired by the Canadian Government up until the mid 1970s and officially declared a National Wildlife Area in 1978. Tintamarre Marshes consists of 1960 hectares that consist primarily of wetlands and historic agricultural land. Two additional units to the area are being proposed but unofficial, surrounding Hog Lake and Towers Goose Lake.

National Wildlife areas like Tintamarre are created to manage and protect native wildlife. Tintamarre Marsh is a breeding area for several types of waterfowl, and home to numerous plants and animals. Environment and Climate Change Canada manages the well being of the various species in Tintamarre and their long time goal is "to maintain and enhance habitat for native wildlife, with a priority given to waterfowl, wetland birds and species at risk." as outlined in a 2016 report. Seven management goals were outlined: wetland diversity, open fields, upland habitat, fish passage, invasive species, human activity, and exterior forces.

Many of the threats posed to the National Wildlife Area are of anthropogenic origin. Unauthorized activities such as camping - including fires, - off road vehicle use, and an overall increase in tourism have the potential to harm and destroy the vulnerable habitat. Other human-based concerns include nearby wind power farms disrupting migratory bird populations and fish pathways for diadromous species no longer functioning as intended. Other threats include invasive species outcompeting native wildlife and climate change.

== Natural environment ==
=== Wildlife ===
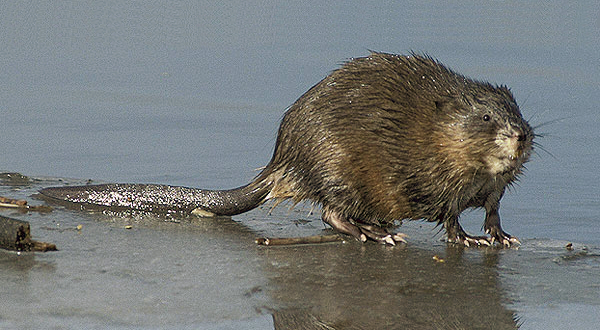
Muskrat. Visually similar to a beaver, but slightly smaller and with a rounder, longer tail.

The Tantramar Marsh is a saltwater tidal marsh comprising many interconnecting waterways. Much of the area is below sea level, but instances of flooding are prevented by the soft ground and plant life which withhold water and filter out toxins. This mix of fresh and saltwater creates unique ecosystems for many species, mostly birds and fish. The word "Tantramar" comes from the French "tintamarre" which means "din", a reference to the cacophony of noise made by the local waterfowl. The environment provides a good stop-over for birds migrating between northern Canada and warmer, southern climates. The marshes are home to species such as the northern harrier (Circus hudsonius), American bittern (Botaurus lentiginosus), sora (Porzana carolina), muskrat (Ondatra zibethicus), and maritime shrew (Sorex maritimensis), all of which are vital to the marsh's ecological systems.

==== Keystone species ====
The presence of these keystone species ensures the continued vitality of the marshes and the ecosystems that they support. The northern harrier is a bird of prey, feeding on small rodents which eat grass seeds and the eggs and young of other birds. The American bittern and Sora are elusive waterfowl which are highly sensitive to changes in their environment, so they have been classified as indicator species. A decrease in their populations alerts conservationists to issues in the marshes such as degradation, loss of prey species, or human interference. The muskrat is a rat-sized rodent which has evolved to become semi-aquatic. They feed on cattails and yellow water lilies, creating open water areas that best suit waterfowl, fish, and frogs. The maritime shrew is another rodent, slightly smaller than the muskrat, which responds to increasing numbers of insects and goes on a feasting spree. It keeps these numbers down and prevents insects from becoming too numerous.

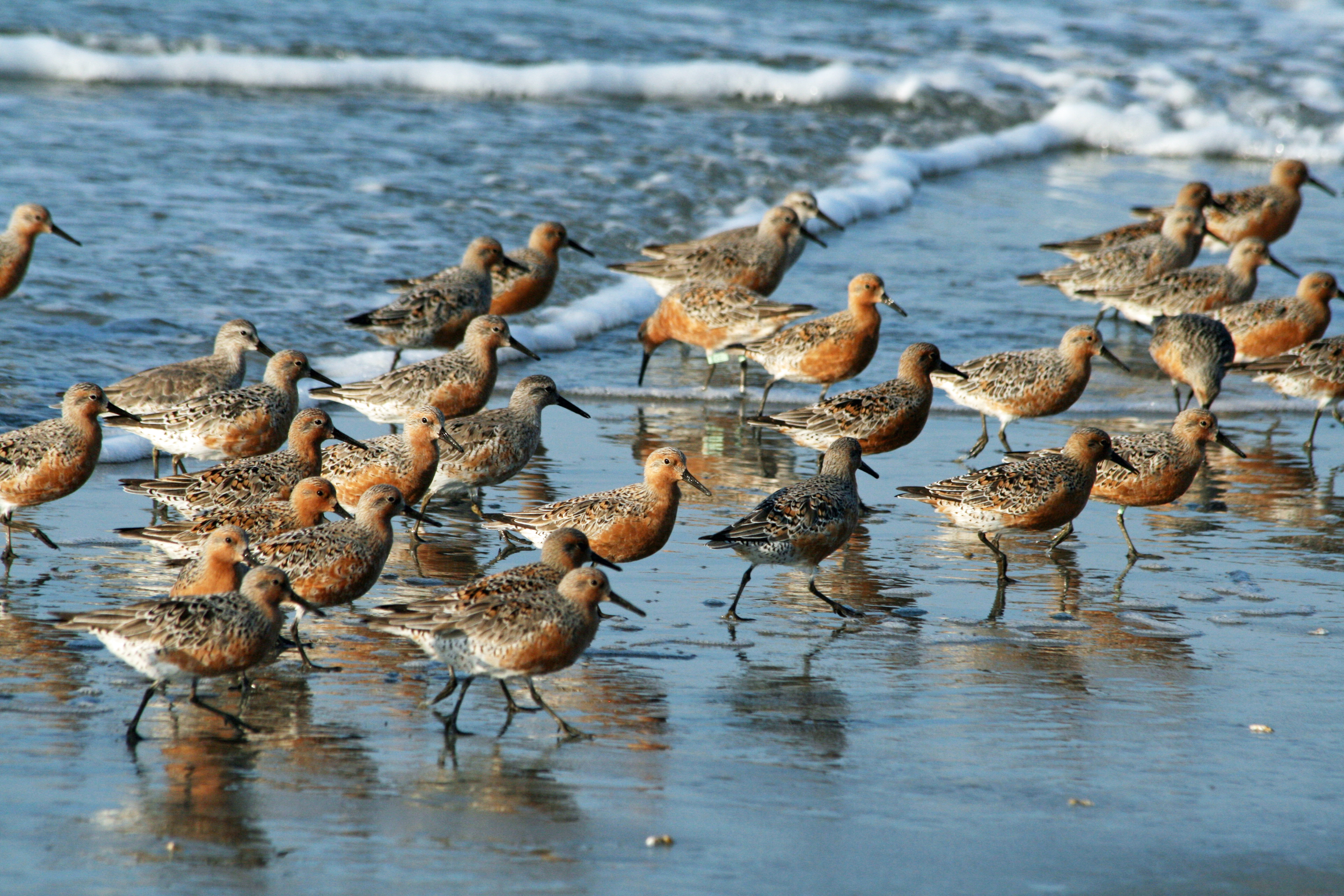
Flock of Red-Knots, designated as "at risk" under the Species at Risk Act

==== Species at risk ====
The marshes are also home to numerous species at risk as designated under the Species at Risk Act (SARA). Bird species include the barn swallow (Hirundo rustica), chimney swift (Chaetura pelagica), Canada warbler (Cardellina canadensis), olive-sided flycatcher (Contopus cooperi), bobolink (Dolichonyx oryzivorus), common nighthawk (Chordeiles minor), red knot (Calidris canutus), least bittern (Ixobrychus exilis), eastern meadowlark (Sturnella magna), and short-eared owl (Asio flammeus). The American eel (Anguilla rostrata) also makes its home here as it can breed in the Gulf's salt water and migrate the short distance to fresh river water in the marshes. The Atlantic salmon (Salmo salar) also enjoys the mix of salt and fresh water – the eggs are laid in the clean waters of rivers and streams where the young can feed and grow safely. Once large enough, they migrate to the salt waters of the gulf until they are ready to return to the marsh to breed. The monarch butterfly (Danaus plexippus) breeds in the marshes during the summer months, thanks to the presence of its host plant milkweed.

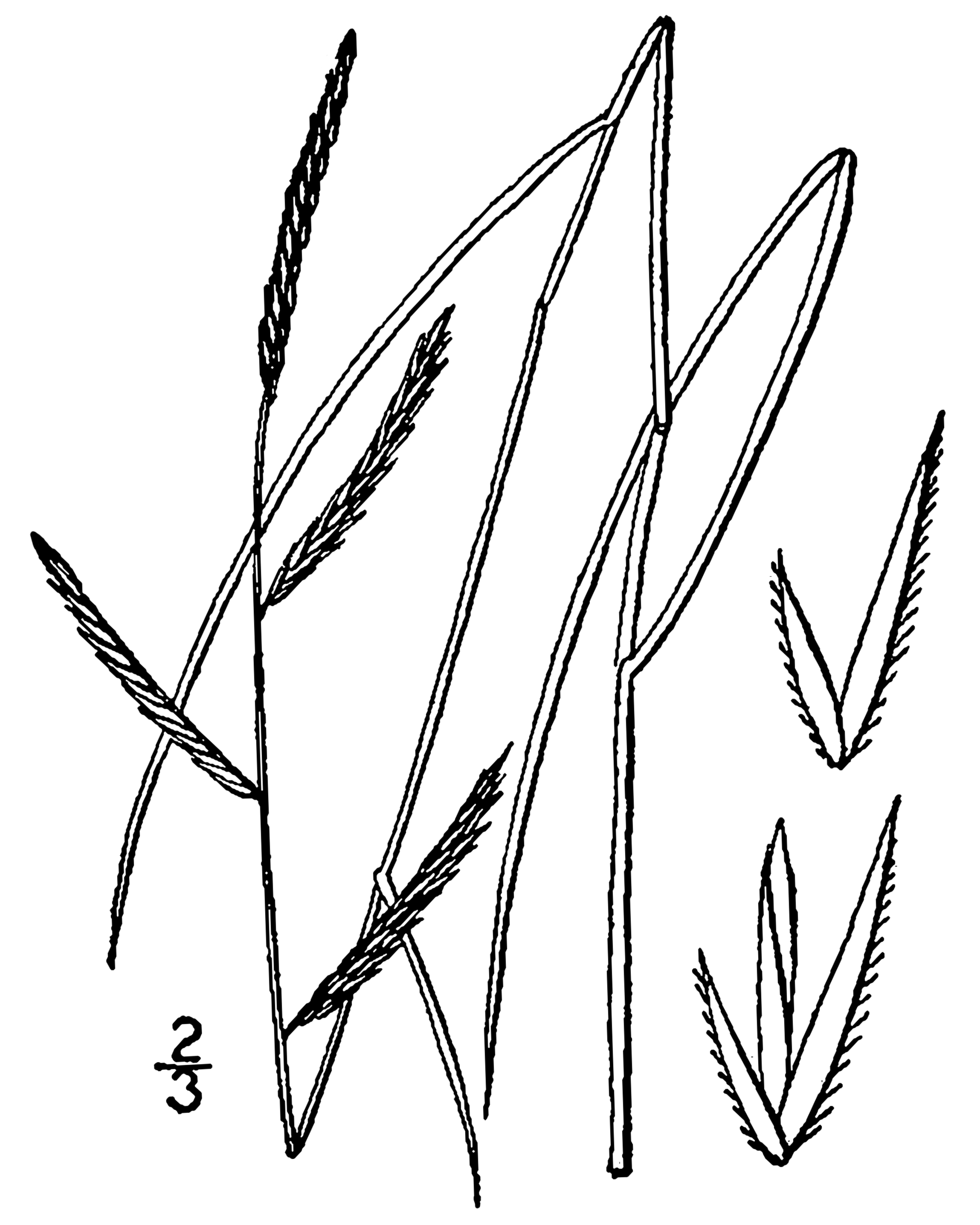
Closer look at the anatomy of Salt-water cordgrass.

=== Plant life ===
With its ability to thrive in exposed environments with low-lying landscapes, Spartina dominates the plant life in the Tantramar marshes. The spartina is essential in stabilizing clay, sand, silt, and muck of the saltmarshes. Saltwater cordgrass (Spartina alternifolia) grows closest to water in the low marshlands along the boundaries of the tidal rivers and are flooded daily with salt water (about 12-15%). Salt-meadow cordgrass (Spartina patens) grow in the high marshlands and are only flooded 2% of the time allowing them to grow taller than saltwater cordgrass. Another type of grass plant is the freshwater cordgrass (Spartina pectinata) which can obtain freshwater runoff from uplands allowing them to grow the tallest of the three. Freshwater cordgrass gets flooded a few times throughout the year during high tides in spring.

Additionally to spartina, located in the middle marshlands, there are two plants that are a part of a low-growing succulent plant family. The samphire (Salicornia europaea) and seablite (Suaeda maritima) grow in bare mud that is located in the middle area that sits just above the high tides of the marshland. In the high marshlands, there is sea lavender (Limonium carolinianum), arrow-grass (Triglochin maritima), seaside plantain (Plantago juncoides), seamilkwort (Glaux maritima), and love-grass (Eragrostis sp.). In naturally forming lakes, there are several plant species belonging to the genus Nuphar. Due to better water and soil drainage, these plants are able to prosper. These species include water lilies, bladderwort (Utricularia), buckbean (Menyanthes), mare's tail (Hippuris vulgaris), and pondweed (Potamogeton natans, P. spirrilus).

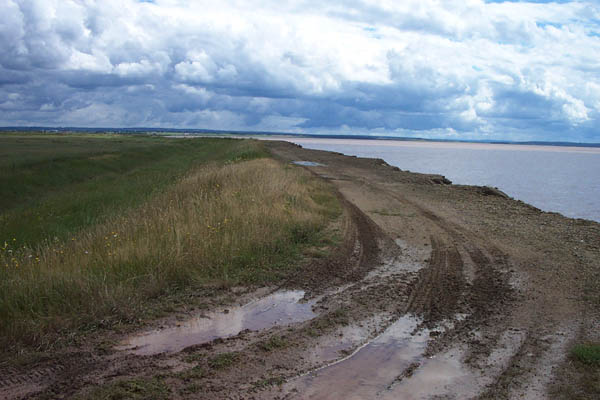
One of the dykes around Tantramar Marsh. Protects the land from large waves and potential flooding. Shown here as a high wall that pedestrians can travel along.

=== Climate change ===
As with most wildlife protection areas, climate change poses a serious threat to the ecology of the Tantramar marsh. Climate change introduces rising temperatures, increases in storm frequency and severity, and rising sea levels which will result in the flooding of low lying land and coastal areas. The rise in temperature is creating new environments in which invasive species and diseases can survive while native species struggle to adapt. Storms bring in unusual levels of precipitation and strong winds which can damage the fragile ecosystems of the marsh and the dykes in New Brunswick which help prevent flooding from the Gulf of Maine. Rising sea levels increase the threat of flooding too much for the marshes to be able to regulate. If Tintamarre National Wildlife Area were to flood with enough sea-water it would cause large scale die-offs and damage for the freshwater species that inhabit the freshwater wetlands. Water from flooding via dyke failure or from increased and more intense storms due to climate change will also lead to accelerated erosion, draining the wetland of many important nutrients.

== Uses of the marsh ==
For a full account of human activity on the marshes, see the History of Sackville.

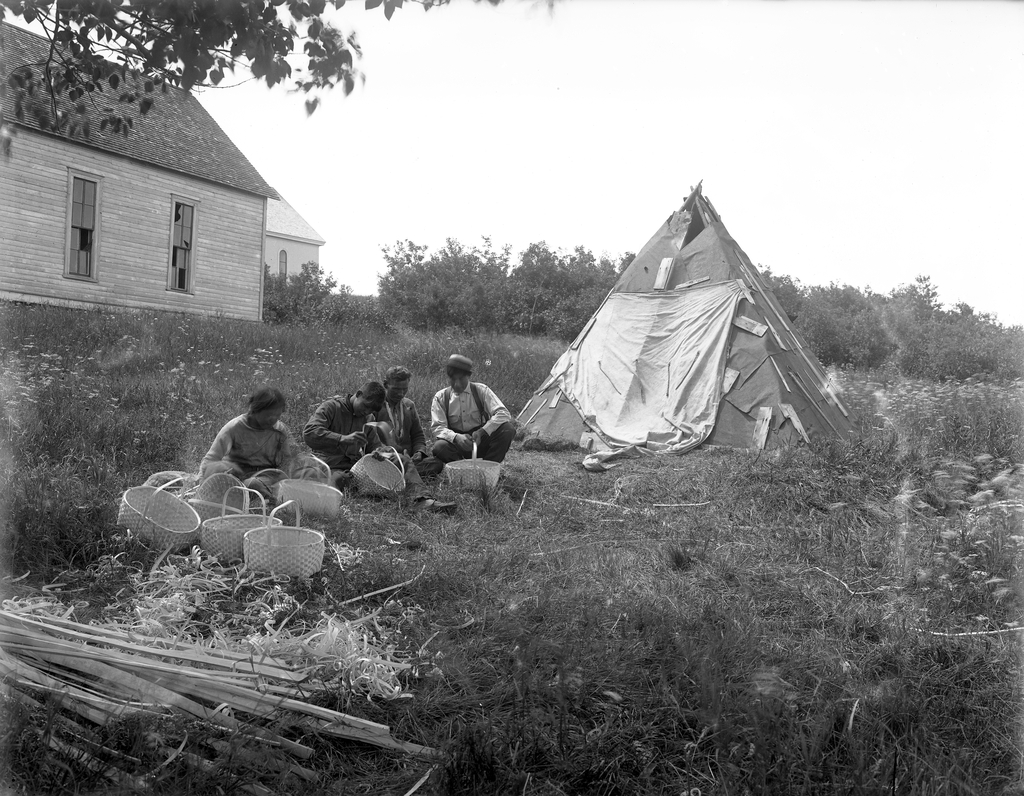
Mi'kmaq peoples weaving baskets next to a lodge of tar and canvas; 1941

=== Historical uses ===
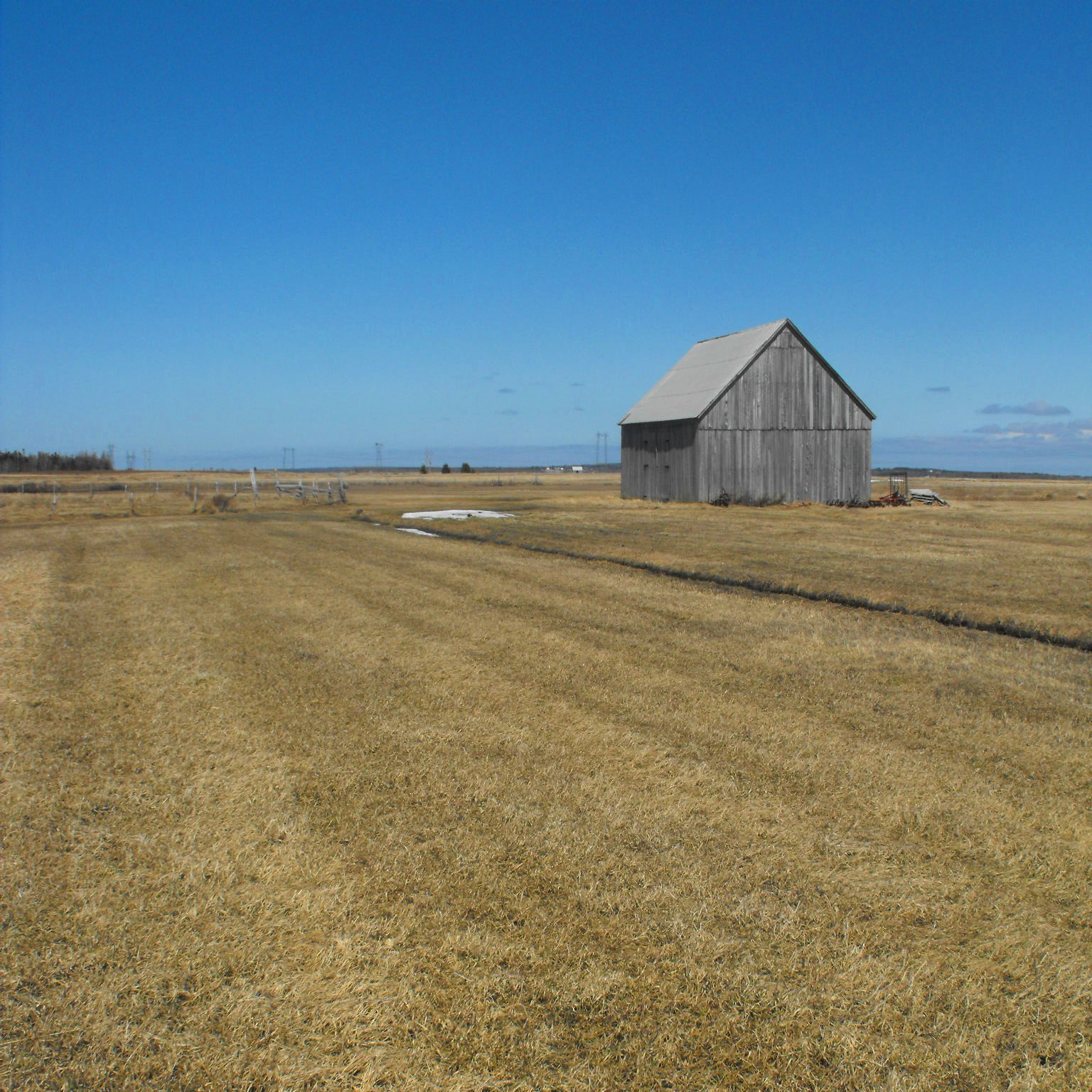
A hay barn of a type once numerous on the Tantramar Marsh.

The Mi'kmaq are the Indigenous peoples of Tantramar marshes and surrounding areas, they have many traditional uses for the resources in this area. The marsh was used for harvesting of different kinds of plants, wildfowl, small mammals and fish as means of food. Before the arrival of Europeans, well-travelled portage routes connected the Bay of Fundy with the Northumberland Strait as the marsh was used seasonally. As years passed and different settlers came to the Tantramar marshes the use of these resources changed, going from the fish weirs of the Mi'kmaq to the creation of dry farming by the Acadians from the creation of sluice gates to keep out water where the rivers crossed the dykes in order for planting to take place.

Migrating from Port Royal in around 1671, Acadians established a village in the area (which they called Beaubassin). They founded a number of scattered settlements on higher ground, and created dry farmland using polderisation, by building the dykes and sluices which converted the salt marshes to fields and pastures. Following the Battle of Fort Beauséjour which marked the end of the battle for Acadia between the British and French, it was the site of the beginning of the expulsion of the Acadians in 1755. Six years later the British resettled the area, and continued to convert the marsh to arable land, drying the land in order to plant crops for agricultural practices.

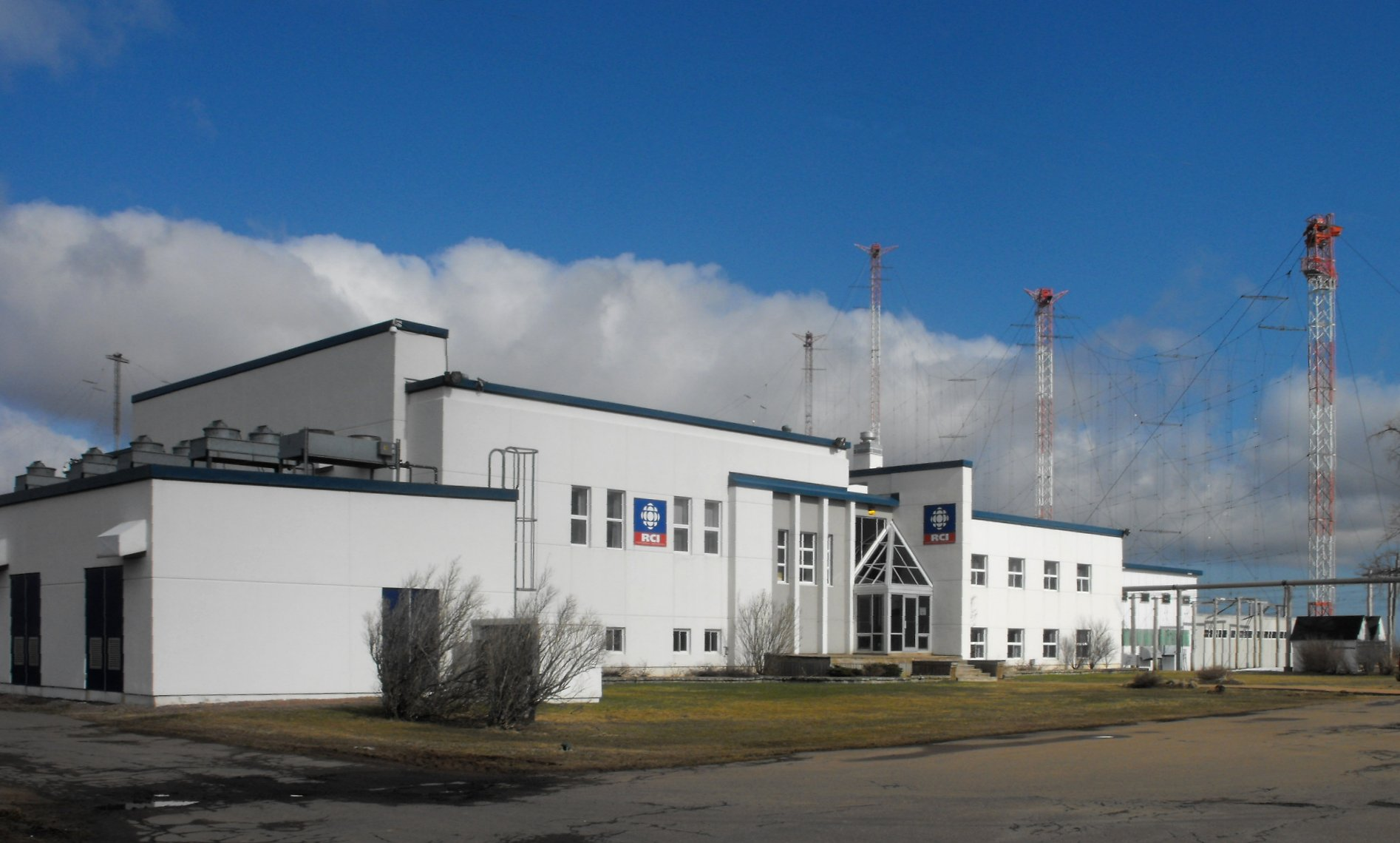
The now-decommissioned RCI transmitter station in 2009.

During the 19th century the land use in and around the Tantramar region changed, land ownership became consolidated and a Commission of Sewers was established, which was crucial to the economy. By the mid-1800s, 10,000 hectares was producing grains, root crops, and marsh hay. Once turned into polders, the cost of producing hay was low. Inexpensive Tantramar hay was then sold to lumber camps, exploration, and mining in Atlantic Canada and stables as far away as Boston. In the 1930s there were more than 400 post-and-beam hay barns on the marshes, for hay storage. Today there are fewer than 30. The price of hay was $28 per ton in 1920, but as horses were replaced by cars and as manufacturing moved west, the hay price fell to $7 a ton in 1938. The marshes then became pasture, and as their agricultural profitability declined the Canadian Wildlife Service and Ducks Unlimited helped to return the marshes to a more natural state. After 2010 fears emerged that rising sea levels and deterioration of 18th-century hand-built dykes and sluices threatened to flood the Tantramar Marshes and make Nova Scotia into an island separate from the North American mainland.

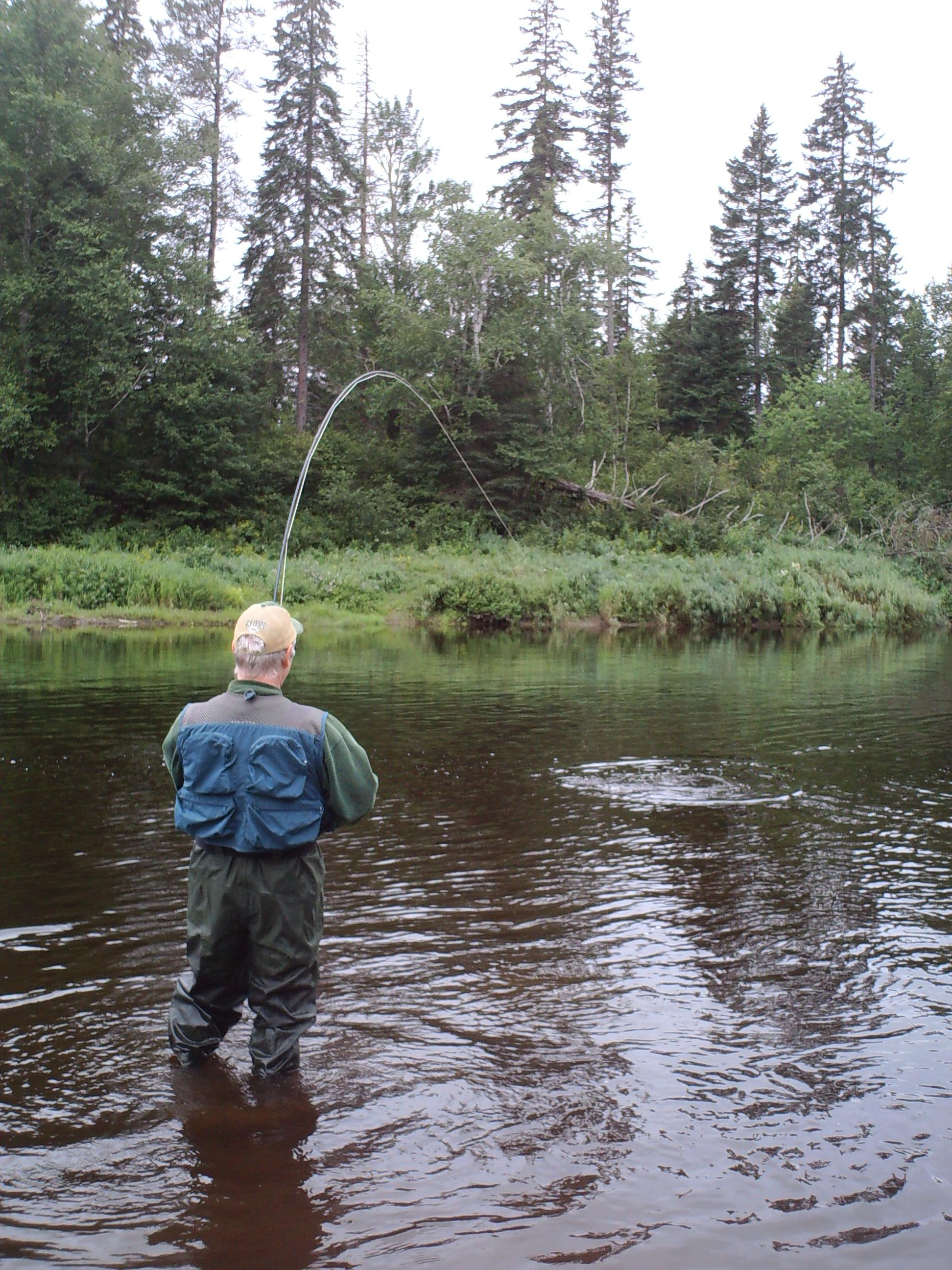
Fishing for Atlantic salmon, a popular pastime that must be monitored using permits and licenses.

In 1945 Radio Canada International opened a radio transmitter and the site proved to be one of the best shortwave transmitting locations in the world. Shortwave broadcasting ended in 2012 and transmitting towers have since been removed. In 2017, the CBC announced that the site had been sold to a non-profit consortium of New Brunswick Mi'kmaq bands known as Mi'gmawe'l Tplu'taqnn. The intended use of the property was not disclosed.

=== Present uses ===
The declaration of the Tantramar Marshes as a protected area resulted in many restrictions being imposed with how the land and water surrounding it can be accessed and used. Visitors are given access to the protected area for things like leisure activities, which include swimming, having group events and meals, using the trails for hikes, boating, skiing/snowboarding and skating. Sport hunting of specific animals is allowed, as long as the required permits have been attained and regulations are followed. Fishing is also allowed but limits are imposed to avoid overfishing, a permit is also required for sport fishing. Any access to the Tintamarre National Wildlife Area, and with regards to all the above-mentioned uses of the park, are only permitted from sunrise to sunset. Use outside of those times is against the Law.

== See also ==
- List of National Wildlife Areas in Canada
- Canadian Wildlife Service
