= Missaguash River =

River in Canada

Coordinates: 45°50′14.2″N 64°16′28.7″W

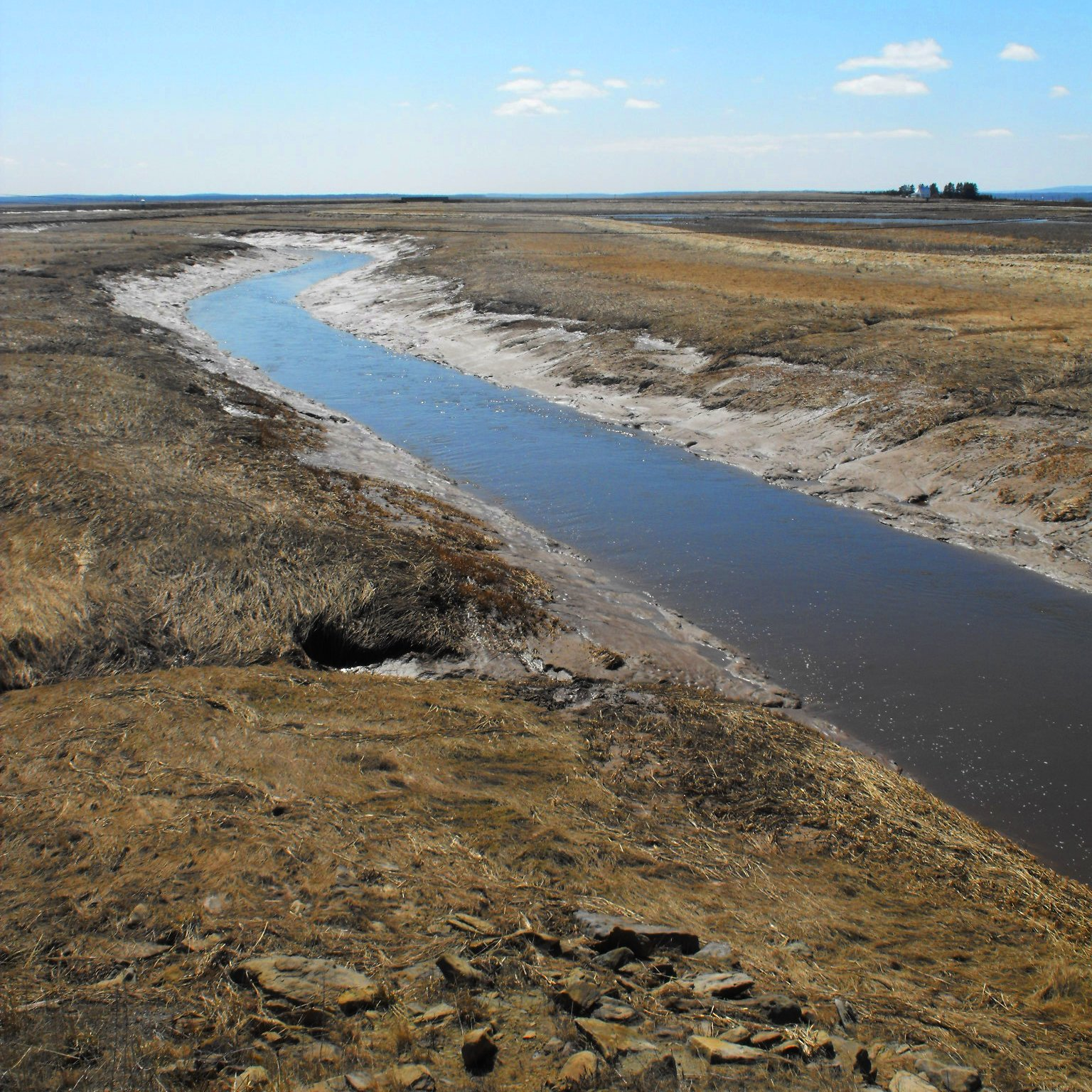
Missiguash River at low tide, spring 2009. Nova Scotia to left. In the background is the National Historic Site of Tonges Island, former home in 1676 of the Seigneur Michel de la Valliere, governor of Acadia.

The Missaguash River (French: Rivière Missaguash) is a small Canadian river that forms the southern portion of the inter-provincial boundary between Nova Scotia and New Brunswick on the Isthmus of Chignecto. It had historic significance in the 18th century as the de facto border between French (to the west) and English-controlled territories.

== History ==
The river's name is from the Mi'kmaq language, likely meaning "marsh river", in reference to the Tantramar Marshes through which it flows. The name can be translated as "muskrat". Musaguash (Morris, 1750); Mesiguash (DesBarres, 1781); Missaguash from 1901 onward. The river flows south into Cumberland Basin. Its source is in the Missaguash Bog, several kilometres to the north.

About 1672 a small group of Acadians from Port Royal, led by Jacques Bourgeois, formed a settlement on the south bank of the Missaguash near its mouth named Beaubassin. The settlers reclaimed the salt marsh bordering the Missaquash for cultivation by constructing dykes to keep out the sea.

This village grew until 1750. The French priest Jean-Louis Le Loutre led Mi'kmaq warriors to burn down the village to force the Acadians to relocate to French-held territory north of the Missaquash. He wanted to bring French settlers together in a time of increasing national tensions with Great Britain. In the fall of 1750 the British Army under Major Charles Lawrence established Fort Lawrence on the site of the burned village.

== See also ==
- List of bodies of water of New Brunswick
- List of rivers of Nova Scotia
