= List of communities in Cumberland County, Nova Scotia =

List of communities in Cumberland County, Nova Scotia

Communities are ordered by the highway on which they are located, whose routes start after each terminus near the largest community.

== Trunk routes ==
- Trunk 2: Fort Lawrence – Amherst – Upper Nappan – Fenwick – Springhill Junction – Springhill – Mapleton – Southampton – West Brook – Halfway River – Lakelands – Parrsboro – Moose River
- Trunk 4: Thompson Station – Oxford – Mahoneys Corner – Wentworth Centre – Wentworth – Wentworth Station
- Trunk 6: Amherst – Truemanville – Amherst Head – Shinimicas Bridge – Linden – Port Howe – Port Philip – Pugwash – Wallace

== Arterial highways ==
- Highway 104: Fort Lawrence – Amherst – Oxford – Thompson Station
- Highway 142: Springhill – Salt Springs

== Collector roads ==
- Route 204: Amherst – Salem – Little River – West Leicester – Mansfield – Oxford – Hansford – South Victoria – Streets Ridge
- Route 209: Parrsboro – Kirkhill – Diligent River – Fox River – Port Greville – Wards Brook – Fraserville – Spencer's Island – Advocate Harbour – New Salem – Apple River – East Apple River – Sand River – Shulie – Joggins
- Route 242: Joggins – River Hebert – Maccan
- Route 301: Oxford – Kolbec – Port Howe
- Route 302: Amherst – Nappan – Maccan – Athol – Southampton
- Route 307: Wallace – Wallace Station – Wentworth Centre
- Route 321: Springhill – River Philip – Oxford Junction – Oxford – Port Philip
- Route 366: Amherst – Tidnish Bridge – Tidnish -Lorneville, Northport – Linden – Port Howe
- Route 368: Mahoneys Corner – Streets Ridge – Middleboro

== Rural roads ==
- Amherst Point
- Barronsfield
- Black Rock
- Chapman Settlement
- Chignecto
- Collingwood Corner
- Conns Mills
- East Mapleton
- Eatonville, Nova Scotia (ghost town)
- Farmington
- Fox Harbour
- Greenville Station
- Gulf Shore
- Harrison Settlement
- Hastings
- Jacksons Point
- Malagash
- Mill Creek
- Minudie
- Mount Pleasant
- New Canaan
- New Yarmouth
- North Shore
- Pugwash Junction
- Rose
- South Brook
- Stonehouse
- Victoria
- Wallace Ridge
- Westchester Station
- Williamsdale
- Wyvern
