= List of historic places in Cumberland County, Nova Scotia =

Cumberland County is a county in the Canadian province of Nova Scotia. This list compiles historic places recognized by the Canadian Register of Historic Places within the county.

== List of historic places ==
Name	Address	Coordinates	Government recognition (CRHP №)	Wikidata ID	Image
Acadia Lodge No. 13 A.F. & A.M.	14 Victoria Street; Pugwash NS	45°51′01″N 63°39′43″W	Nova Scotia (10939), Pugwash municipality (12775)	Q137293572	Upload Photo
Advocate United Church	3680 Highway 209; Advocate Harbour NS	45°20′07″N 64°46′51″W	Advocate Harbour municipality (11874)	Q137293647	Upload Photo
Amherst Dominion Public Building	98 East Victoria Street; Amherst NS	45°50′03″N 64°12′46″W	Nova Scotia (14641)	Q136814365	More images
Amherst Point Baptist Church	908 Southampton Road; Amherst Point NS	45°47′54″N 64°15′34″W	Amherst Point municipality (10996)	Q137293676	Upload Photo
Armoury	Amherst NS	45°50′03″N 64°12′30″W	Federal (9708)	Q136813213	More images
Beaubassin National Historic Site of Canada	Highway 4 Fort Lawrence NS	45°50′53″N 64°16′00″W	Federal (13964)	Q2893108	More images
Building 16	Nappan Experimental Farm, Highway 302; Nappan NS	45°45′32″N 64°14′21″W	Federal (11260)	Q137299405	Upload Photo
Bulmer House	8740 No 2 Highway; Great Village NS	45°24′59″N 63°35′59″W	Nova Scotia (3684)	Q4557247	More images
Cannon House	10215 Highway 209; Diligent River NS	45°24′46″N 64°27′27″W	Nova Scotia (7814)	Q137162582	Upload Photo
Chapman House National Historic Site of Canada	Chapman Road; Fort Lawrence NS	45°52′29″N 64°14′46″W	Federal (7568)	Q23011183	More images
Church of the Good Shepherd	842 Tidnish Head Road; Tidnish Cross Roads NS	45°59′38″N 64°00′38″W	Tidnish Cross Roads municipality (11001)	Q137293832	Upload Photo
96 Church Street	96 Church Street; Amherst NS	45°49′52″N 64°12′28″W	Amherst municipality (15306)	Q137293853	Upload Photo
150 Church Street	150 Church Street; Amherst NS	45°49′43″N 64°12′06″W	Amherst municipality (8298)	Q136799464	Upload Photo
Civic Building	4030 Eastern Ave; Parrsboro NS	45°24′22″N 64°19′31″W	Parrsboro municipality (7016)	Q137293928	More images
Coldspring Head Lighthouse	Lobster Cove Lane; Northport NS	45°57′45″N 63°51′55″W	Federal (20772, (9682)	Q28375777	More images
Davison-Kennedy House	13440 Highway 6 Wallace Bay NS	45°48′41″N 63°30′06″W	Wallace Bay municipality (11519)	Q130023703	Upload Photo
Dewis House	3291 Highway 209; Advocate Harbour NS	45°20′40″N 64°47′59″W	Advocate Harbour municipality (11319)	Q137293954	Upload Photo
Fort Lawrence National Historic Site of Canada	Fort Lawrence Road; Fort Lawrence NS	45°50′52″N 64°15′42″W	Federal (13271)	Q5471487	More images
Fort Lawrence Terminus	Fort Lawrence Road; Route 4 Fort Lawrence NS	45°50′24″N 64°16′01″W	Nova Scotia (7832)	Q5097222	More images
Hanna House	5755 Highway 2 Lakelands NS	45°29′18″N 64°21′02″W	Lakelands municipality (11913)	Q137293965	Upload Photo
30 Hickman Street	30 Hickman Street; Amherst NS	45°49′24″N 64°12′54″W	Amherst municipality (8259)	Q137293994	Upload Photo
Howard House	216 Fountain Road; Middleboro NS	45°45′10″N 63°34′07″W	Middleboro municipality (11318)	Q137294005	Upload Photo
Joggins Fossil Cliffs	100 Main St; Joggins NS	45°41′31″N 64°26′37″W	Nova Scotia (14787)	Q1439433	More images
King Seaman Church	5508 Barronsfield Road; Minudie NS	45°46′31″N 64°20′53″W	Nova Scotia (7720), Minudie municipality (11253)	Q137294027	More images
Lamp Cabin Building	31 Industrial Park Drive; Springhill NS	45°38′42″N 64°03′52″W	Nova Scotia (9809)	Q137294101	Upload Photo
Layton's General Store	8724 No.2 Highway; Great Village NS	45°24′59″N 63°36′00″W	Nova Scotia (3034)	Q136813052	Upload Photo
Little Red Schoolhouse	571 Highway 6 Amherst NS	45°50′59″N 64°10′45″W	Amherst municipality (11002)	Q136814392	More images
Manning Block	151 Main Street; Parrsboro NS	45°24′12″N 64°19′37″W	Nova Scotia (6847)	Q137162652	Upload Photo
Melville United Church Cemetery	2036 Gulf Shore Road; RR #2; Pugwash NS	45°31′19″N 63°20′09″W	Pugwash municipality (11806)	Q137294113	Upload Photo
Minudie School Museum	5518 Barronsfield Road; Minudie NS	45°46′32″N 64°20′56″W	Nova Scotia (7723)	Q136798493	More images
Mullins Point Upper Range Lighthouse	North Wallace Road; North Wallace NS	45°49′27″N 63°26′37″W	Nova Scotia (7090)		
Nappan Experimental Farm, Cereal Forage Building	Highway 302; Nappan NS	45°45′32″N 64°14′20″W	Federal (2010)	Q137299428	Upload Photo
Old Amherst Post Office	50 Victoria Street East; Amherst NS	45°49′59″N 64°12′49″W	Nova Scotia (7268), Amherst municipality (8263)	Q136812891	More images
Old Post Office	168 Main Street; Parrsboro NS	45°24′13″N 64°19′36″W	Parrsboro municipality (7017)	Q117384817	More images
Ottawa House	1155 Whitehall Road; Partridge Island; Parrsboro NS	45°22′31″N 64°19′46″W	Nova Scotia (13852), Parrsboro municipality (7019)	Q111365584	More images
Port Greville Lighthouse	8334 Highway 209; Wards Brook NS	45°24′51″N 64°33′13″W	Wards Brook municipality (11321)	Q28375840	More images
Pugwash Train Station	10222 Durham Street; Pugwash NS	45°51′00″N 63°39′39″W	Nova Scotia (14921), Pugwash municipality (11803)	Q7258982	More images
1 Ratchford Street	1 Ratchford Street; Amherst NS	45°50′03″N 64°12′40″W	Amherst municipality (8275)	Q7842541	Upload Photo
Renwick United Church	6429 Highway 6 Linden NS	45°52′45″N 63°50′11″W	Linden municipality (15223)	Q137294141	Upload Photo
River Philip United Church	2808 Wyvern Road; River Philip NS	45°39′38″N 63°54′21″W	River Philip municipality (11856)	Q137299053	More images
St. Andrew's Anglican Church	13611 Highway 6 Wallace NS	45°48′40″N 63°29′41″W	Wallace municipality (11850)	Q137299089	Upload Photo
St. Denis Church	5534 Barronsfield Road; Minudie NS	45°46′32″N 64°21′00″W	Nova Scotia (7264)	Q137299111	More images
St. George's Anglican Church	216 Main Street; Parrsboro NS	45°24′17″N 64°19′35″W	Parrsboro municipality (7018)	Q7588091	More images
St. James United Church	8729 No. 2 Highway; Great Village NS	45°24′57″N 63°36′02″W	Nova Scotia (7267)	Q137299132	More images
Saint Matthew's Presbyterian Church	3863 No. 307 Highway; Wallace NS	45°48′45″N 63°28′24″W	Nova Scotia (8086)	Q137299145	Upload Photo
Amos Thomas Seaman House	5355 Barronsfield Road; Minudie NS	45°46′22″N 64°20′22″W	Nova Scotia (7815), Minudie municipality (11862)	Q137299162	Upload Photo
Lorne Smith House	11 Highway 302; Southampton NS	45°35′47″N 64°14′54″W	Southampton municipality (11317)	Q137299194	Upload Photo
Spencer's Island Lighthouse	Spencer's Beach Road; Spencer's Island NS	45°21′14″N 64°42′46″W	Spencer's Island municipality (11808)	Q28375855	More images
Springhill Coal Mining National Historic Site of Canada	Corner of Industrial Park Dr and Memorial Crescent; Springhill NS	45°34′09″N 62°39′27″W	Federal (17988)	Q65046989	More images
Stone House	Gulf Shore Road; Lower Gulf Shore NS	45°52′30″N 63°31′22″W	Nova Scotia (7282)	Q137299208	Upload Photo
Thinkers' Lodge National Historic Site of Canada	247 Water Street; Pugwash NS	45°51′12″N 63°39′54″W	Federal (12561)	Q23019143	More images
Tidnish Bridge	Route 366; Tidnish Bridge NS	45°58′34″N 64°02′37″W	Nova Scotia (7831)	Q117712327	More images
Tidnish Dock Site	Route 366 at Tidnish Cross Roads; Tidnish NS	45°59′52″N 64°00′28″W	Nova Scotia (7830)	Q22504477	More images
Trueman House	2721 Highway 6 Truemanville NS	45°51′52″N 64°03′00″W	Truemanville municipality (11493)	Q137299235	Upload Photo
Victoria	177 Victoria Street; Amherst NS	45°50′16″N 64°12′22″W	Nova Scotia (7289), Amherst municipality (8257)	Q137299251	Upload Photo
54 Victoria Street East	54 Victoria Street East; Amherst NS	45°50′00″N 64°12′47″W	Amherst municipality (8258)	Q137299257	Upload Photo
60 Victoria Street East (Christ Church)	60 Victoria Street East (Christ Church); Amherst NS	45°50′00″N 64°12′47″W	Amherst municipality (8262)	Q137299262	Upload Photo
66 Victoria Street East	66 Victoria Street East; Amherst NS	45°50′02″N 64°12′46″W	Amherst municipality (8260)	Q136813080	More images
79 Victoria Street East (Bank of Nova Scotia)	79 Victoria Street East (Bank of Nova Scotia); Amherst NS	45°50′02″N 64°12′46″W	Amherst municipality (8261)	Q136814292	More images
91 Victoria Street East	91 Victoria Street East; Amherst NS	45°50′03″N 64°12′45″W	Amherst municipality (8256)	Q137299277	Upload Photo
100 Victoria Street East	100 Victoria Street East; Amherst NS	45°50′04″N 64°12′45″W	Nova Scotia (6497), Amherst municipality (14801)	Q137299292	Upload Photo
233 Victoria Street East	233 Victoria Street East; Amherst NS	45°50′28″N 64°11′55″W	Amherst municipality (8255)	Q137299297	Upload Photo
27 Victoria Street West	27 Victoria Street West; Amherst NS	45°49′58″N 64°12′48″W	Amherst municipality (15656)	Q137299308	Upload Photo
46 Victoria Street West	46 Victoria Street West; Amherst NS	45°49′40″N 64°12′58″W	Amherst municipality (8254)	Q137299323	Upload Photo
VIA Rail/Canadian National Railways Station	Station Street; Amherst NS	45°49′51″N 64°12′45″W	Federal (4564)	Q3095620	More images
Wallace Harbour Sector Lighthouse	Sunrise Trail east of Wallace; Wallace NS	45°48′47″N 63°27′44″W	Federal (21135)	Q28375865	More images
Wallace River Railway Swing Bridge	Route 6 Wallace NS	45°47′33″N 63°31′57″W	Nova Scotia (6941)	Q131842990	More images
Warren Baptist Church	56 Cross Rd; Hastings NS	45°50′41″N 64°07′29″W	Hastings municipality (11195)	Q137299329	Upload Photo
Wentworth United Baptist Church	13755 Highway 4 Wentworth NS	45°38′46″N 63°33′04″W	Wentworth municipality (11315)	Q137299336	Upload Photo
Wentworth Valley Schoolhouse	80 Barclay Road; Wentworth NS	45°36′21″N 63°33′43″W	Wentworth municipality (11316)	Q137299348	Upload Photo

== See also ==
- List of historic places in Nova Scotia
- List of National Historic Sites of Canada in Nova Scotia
- Heritage Property Act (Nova Scotia)
