= Mount Pleasant, Nova Scotia =

Mount Pleasant, Nova Scotia may refer to:

- Mount Pleasant, Cumberland County, Nova Scotia
- Mount Pleasant, Digby County, Nova Scotia
- Mount Pleasant, Inverness County, Nova Scotia
- Mount Pleasant, Lunenburg County, Nova Scotia
- Mount Pleasant, Pictou, Pictou, Nova Scotia (Pictou County 1879 Historical Atlas, Section 10)
- Mount Pleasant, Queens, Nova Scotia, Region of Queens Municipality
