= Fox Harbour =

Fox Harbour may refer to several different things:

== Canada ==
Newfoundland and Labrador

- Fox Harbour, Newfoundland and Labrador
- Fox Harbour (Labrador), Newfoundland and Labrador

Nova Scotia

- Fox Harbour, Nova Scotia
  - Fox Harbour Airport
