= Ernie Fage =

Canadian politician (1953–2026)

The Honourable Ernie Fage

Member of the Nova Scotia House of Assembly for Cumberland North
- In office November 4, 1997 – June 9, 2009
- Preceded by: Ross Bragg
- Succeeded by: Brian Skabar

Personal details
- Born: August 15, 1953 Hastings, Cumberland, Nova Scotia, Canada
- Died: January 27, 2026 (aged 72) Halifax, Nova Scotia, Canada
- Party: Independent (2007–2009)
- Other political affiliations: Progressive Conservative (1997–2007)
- Occupation: Farmer

Ernest Leslie Fage (August 15, 1953 – January 27, 2026) was a Canadian politician who represented the electoral district of Cumberland North in the Nova Scotia House of Assembly from 1997 to 2009.

== Early life and education ==
Fage was born in Amherst, Nova Scotia on August 15, 1953. He graduated from the Nova Scotia Agricultural College with a major in chemistry. Along with his brother, he owned and operated Fage Farms.

== Political career ==
First elected as a Progressive Conservative in a 1997 by-election, Fage served various cabinets as Minister of Agriculture and Fisheries, Minister of Economic Development, Minister of Human Resources, Minister of responsible for the Public Service Commission, Minister of Emergency Management, Minister of Natural Resources, and Minister of Energy.

Fage was forced to take a leave of absence from the party caucus in January 2007 after allegations that he had engaged in criminal behaviour following a car collision on November 24, 2006. Fage was subsequently charged criminally with leaving the scene of an incident. Witnesses reported that Fage smelled of alcohol at the time of the collision, but he was not charged with an alcohol-related offense due to lack of evidence.

He was found guilty of leaving the scene of an incident, and fined $800, on December 18, 2007, and it was subsequently announced he would not be allowed back into caucus. Prior to the verdict Fage said he planned on running in the next election. He continued to sit as an independent MLA until the 2009 election, when he was defeated by Brian Skabar — notably, however, Fage finished in second place ahead of Keith Hunter, his replacement as the Progressive Conservative candidate.

Nine months before the collision, Fage was also involved in a controversy around a government loan to a potato farm with which he had a personal business connection. As a result, he resigned from his cabinet post as Minister of Economic Development.

== Death ==
Fage died on January 27, 2026, at the age of 72.
