= West Apple River =

Community in Nova Scotia, Canada

Coordinates: 45°27′24.9″N 64°51′17.5″W

West Apple River in Nova Scotia

West Apple River is the western side and main populated area of the Canadian rural community of Apple River, Nova Scotia in Cumberland County, Nova Scotia.

Located west of Advocate Harbour on the Bay of Fundy, it is situated on the Glooscap Trail.

It is also the location of the Apple River Airport and a locally run small craft harbour.
