= Williamsdale =

Williamsdale may refer to:

- Williamsdale, Australian Capital Territory
- Williamsdale, New South Wales, Australia
- Williamsdale, Nova Scotia, Canada
- Williamsdale, Ohio, United States
