= Amherst Armoury =

Historic building in Nova Scotia, Canada

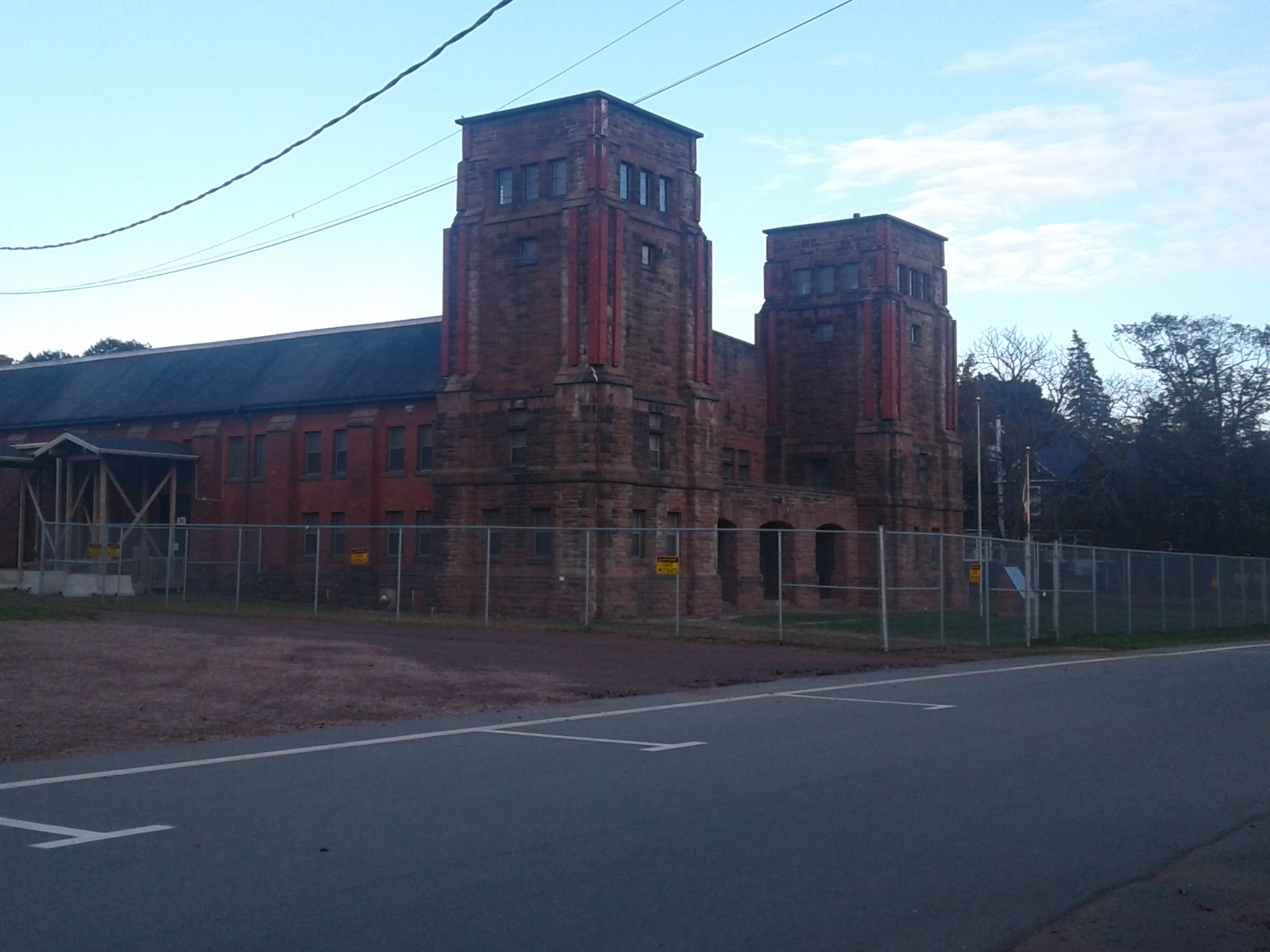
- The armoury in 2023
- Interactive map of the Amherst Armoury area
- Alternative names: Colonel James Layton Ralston Armoury

General information
- Type: Armoury; drill hall
- Location: 34 Acadia Street, Amherst, Nova Scotia, Canada
- Coordinates: 45.8341°N 64.2082°W
- Opened: 15 February 1915
- Owner: Department of National Defence

Technical details
- Material: Limestone; brick

The Amherst Armoury, also known as the Colonel James Layton Ralston Armoury, is a historic armoury located in the Canadian town of Amherst, Nova Scotia. Constructed in 1915, the armoury is a large building prominently situated on Acadia Street comprising two towers and a spacious drill hall.

== History ==
The Amherst Armoury is a large brick and stone building at 34 Acadia Street, erected to house the 85th Canadian Infantry Battalion. It features two towers and a large drill hall built from brick and stone, constructed by the Engineer Services Branch of the Department of Militia and Defence. The armoury was officially opened on 15 February 1915, and was later named the Colonel James Layton Ralston Armoury in honour of James Ralston.

In 1990, the Amherst Armoury was recognized as a federal heritage building. The armoury was the home of the Nova Scotia Highlanders until 2006 when they moved to Pictou; it continued to be used as their regimental museum and by cadets until 2015. A year later, in 2016, the federal government declared the armoury a surplus building.

The armoury underwent repairs in 2010 to stabilize the building, and access to some areas of the building was subsequently restricted. In August 2020, the armoury was abruptly closed by the federal government due to structural concerns, leaving local politicians such as the MP Lenore Zann "shocked" and "completely blindsided". The MLA for Cumberland North, Elizabeth Smith-McCrossin, was also critical of the decision to close the armoury. After some repairs, the armoury re-opened to the public on 30 September 2020.

In April 2024, the federal government announced plans to sell the Amherst Armoury to make more land available for development of housing. In response, Vets Canada expressed interest in acquiring the building to convert into veterans' housing, a plan supported by the MP for Cumberland—Colchester, Stephen Ellis.

In July 2025, the Amherst Armoury was closed once again due to hazardous levels of mould in the building.

== See also ==
- Amherst Internment Camp
- List of armouries in Canada
- List of historic places in Cumberland County, Nova Scotia
