= Mapleton =

Mapleton may refer to:

== Places ==
=== Australia ===
- Mapleton, Queensland, a rural town and locality in the Sunshine Coast Region

=== Canada ===
- Mapleton, New Brunswick, a rural community in Kings County
- Mapleton, Moncton, New Brunswick, a neighborhood
- Mapleton, Nova Scotia
- Mapleton, Ontario

=== England ===
- Mapleton, Derbyshire

=== United States ===
- Mapleton, Illinois
- Mapleton, Iowa
- Mapleton, Kansas
- Mapleton, Maine, a New England town
  - Mapleton (CDP), Maine, the main village in the town
- Mapleton, Michigan
- Mapleton, Minnesota
- Mapleton, New York, hamlet in Niagara County
- Mapleton, Brooklyn, New York, a neighborhood
- Mapleton (White Plains, New York), a house listed on the National Register of Historic Places
- Mapleton, Oregon
- Mapleton, Pennsylvania
- Mapleton, North Dakota
- Mapleton, Utah
- Mapleton, Wisconsin

== Companies ==
- Mapleton Communications
