= Chapman House (Nova Scotia) =

Historic house in Nova Scotia, Canada

- Maison Chapman
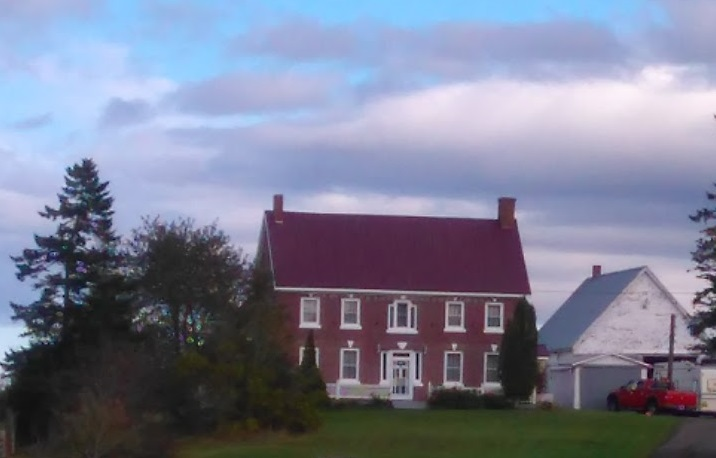
- The Chapman House in wintertime
- Interactive map of Chapman House
- 45°52′29″N 64°14′46″W
- Location: Cumberland County, Nova Scotia, Canada
- Nearest city: Fort Lawrence, NS

History
- Built: c. 1780
- Built for: Major Thomas Chapman

Site notes
- Architect(s): Charles Dixon & William Chapman
- Architectural style: Georgian
- Current use: Residence / Dwelling
- Governing body: Parks Canada
- Owner: George & Marylin Carter

National Historic Site of Canada
- Official name: Chapman House National Historic Site of Canada
- Designated: 21 November 1968

The Chapman House is a National Historic Site of Canada located on Mount Whatley Road in Fort Lawrence, Nova Scotia consisting of a Georgian style brick house and the lot on which it sits.

== History ==
The house is a two-storey house built in the Georgian style of the eighteenth century, typical of many maritime farmhouses from that period. The house was built atop of a knoll, and overlooks the Amherst Marsh along with the LaPlanche River. The house was built from around 1775 to around 1780 by Charles Dixon (or Dickson) and William Chapman Jr. for Major Thomas Chapman. After Thomas died his son William lived in the house.

Thomas Chapman was one of several pre-Loyalist Yorkish immigrants to this area in the 1770s, and had this house built to farm the fertile marshes and dyke lands already developed by the Acadians. The house is now owned by George and Marilyn Carter (since 1971), who are distant relatives of the original Chapmans. The Chapman House is full of war souvenirs because of the family's military history. Souvenirs from the American Revolutionary War, Crimean War and both World Wars are kept inside the house.

== Historic Site Designation ==
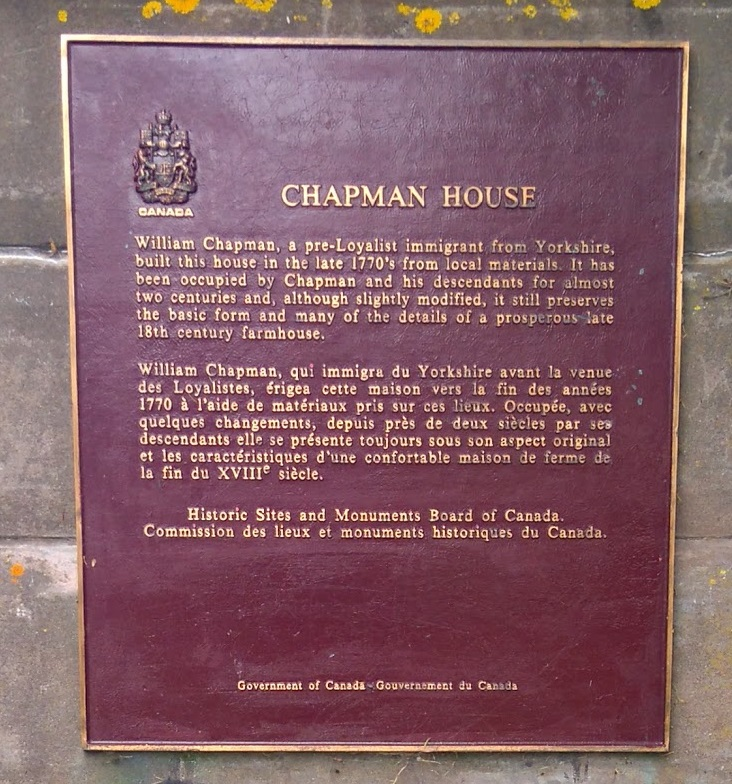
The National Historic Site of Canada plaque at Chapman House.

The official National Historic Site of Canada refers to the house and also the lot on which it is built, which also includes a cairn and plaque for the house. Chapman House was designated a National Historic Site of Canada on 21 November 1968 because it preserves the typical basic form and detail of a prosperous 18th century farmhouse. However, many at the time did not feel it deserved a plaque as it was in a state of relative disrepair after being in the care of a widower and his son who kept a large flock of geese on the property. Chapman House is also one of the few remaining pre-Loyalist brick houses, and possibly the oldest in Cumberland County.

The house has a gable roof, and was originally rectangular until an addition was built more recently. However, some features of the house are more peculiar. A gable wall on the South end rises up to form a chimney, a style reminiscent of Northern England & Scotland, likely an ode to their previous home in Yorkshire.

== Structure & Style ==
Chapman House is built of red bricks made from locally sourced marsh clay. The bricks are laid in a Flemish bond, a style which was very popular at the time. Above the doors and windows, the frame is made of local Wallace sandstone, which was also used in the construction of the Canadian Parliament Buildings. On the front door there is an ornate door knocker detailed with an Acanthus leaf, a very popular Georgian ornamental decoration. Above the windows, there are embrasures for defending the house used during the Seven Years' War and the siege of nearby Fort Cumberland by rebels. It is debated whether the house was used by the rebels or the crown militia in the Eddy Rebellion. The house was originally in rectangular form, as is typical of the Georgian Period, but an addition has since modified the shape so that it is a "T". Chapman House has an odd number of windows, nine, with there being four symmetrical windows on each side of the door, a central, more prominent window above the door and the door centred just underneath that. This symmetry is also typical of the Georgian Period. Something less typical, however, is the lack of symmetry in the chimneys. One notices that they are equally spaced on either side of the building, yet they are drastically different sizes. The house has a stone foundation and entrances on all sides.

== See also ==
- List of National Historic Sites of Canada in Nova Scotia
- List of historic places in Cumberland County, Nova Scotia
- History of Nova Scotia
