= New Canaan (disambiguation) =

New Canaan is a town in the U.S. state of Connecticut.

New Canaan may also refer to:

- New Canaan (CDP), Connecticut, the central village in the town of New Canaan
- New Canaan, Nova Scotia, a community in Cumberland County
- New Canaan, Ontario, a rural settlement in Essex County
- Nova Canaã, Bahia, a municipality in Brazil
- New Canaan, an area in or near Harare, Zimbabwe
- New Canaan, a song by Bill Wurtz
- New Canaan, a mentioned location in the Fallout: New Vegas video game
