= Fox Harbour, Nova Scotia =

Community in Nova Scotia, Canada

Coordinates: 45°51′24.1″N 63°29′15.6″W

Fox Harbour in Nova Scotia

Fox Harbour is a Canadian rural community in Cumberland County, Nova Scotia, situated on a peninsula extending into the Northumberland Strait.

It reportedly received its name from a Captain Fox who stayed there at a point during the Seven Years' War.

The community's primary industries are agriculture, fishing and tourism. Fox Harbour is located on a harbour of the same name; the community of Lower Gulf Shore is to the west and Wallace is to the south.

Homes are primarily situated around the harbour with a focal point being the picturesque St. Andrew's United Church, part of the Three Harbours Pastoral Charge of the United Church of Canada.

== Fox Harb'r Resort ==
During the late 1990s, the entrepreneur Ron Joyce developed an exclusive luxury resort and gated community situated around Cape Cliff on the north side of the peninsula between the community and the Northumberland Strait. Named Fox Harb'r Resort, the facility includes condominiums, marina, a championship golf course, restaurant and spa. It is served by Fox Harbour Airport.
