= Mill Creek, Nova Scotia =

Mill Creek, Nova Scotia could be the following places in Nova Scotia:

- Mill Creek, Cumberland County in Cumberland County
- Mill Creek, Cape Breton in the Cape Breton Regional Municipality
