= South Brook =

South Brook may refer to:

- South Brook (Mehoopany Creek)
- South Brook, Nova Scotia
- South Brook, Newfoundland and Labrador

== See also ==
- Southbrook (disambiguation)
