= Moose River, Nova Scotia =

Moose River, Nova Scotia may refer to the following places in Nova Scotia, Canada:

- Moose River, Pictou, Nova Scotia in Pictou County
- Moose River, Cumberland, Nova Scotia in Cumberland County
- Moose River Gold Mines, Nova Scotia in the Halifax Regional Municipality
