= Athol, Nova Scotia =

Community in Nova Scotia, Canada

Coordinates: 45.675°N 64.216111°W

Athol in Nova Scotia

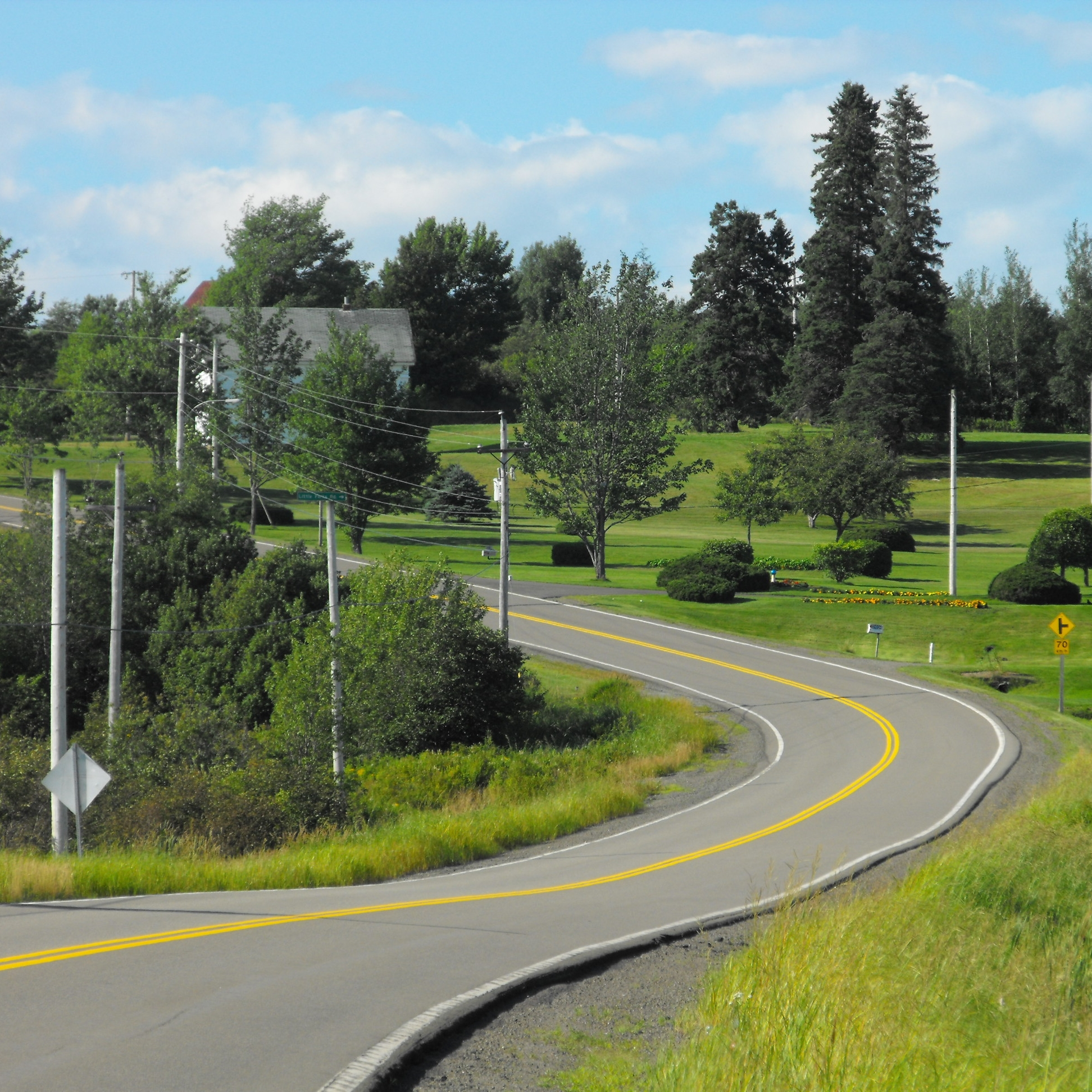
Athol, Nova Scotia

Athol is a community in the Canadian province of Nova Scotia, located between Amherst and Parrsboro. The community is named after John Murray, 4th Duke of Atholl.

It has no major businesses apart from a moderate sized lumber business owned and run by a number of brothers from the same family. When the lumber season is quiet it just so happens to be the season for blueberries which is big business. Athol has a very small population. The school line for Parrsboro Regional High School and River Hebert District High School is located in Athol. The Little Forks Road, and the Athol Road, two major roads leading to Springhill, Nova Scotia, start in Athol. Athol is located on the Maccan River. The nearest "town" to Athol for grocery shopping is Amherst.

Athol appears as Bathol in the novelist Will R. Bird's Here Stays Good Yorkshire. Athol was settled by Yorkshire immigrants in the late eighteenth century.
