= Mansfield, Nova Scotia =

Community in Nova Scotia, Canada

Coordinates: 45°48′7.2″N 63°56′45.32″W

Mansfield in Nova Scotia

Mansfield is a community in the Canadian province of Nova Scotia, located in Cumberland County. It is about 10 km long and it mainly consists of wilderness since it is located in a rural setting. It was once an area for pioneer settlements.
