= Greenville Station =

Community in Nova Scotia, Canada

Coordinates: 45°39′4.06″N 63°39′46.27″W

Greenville Station in Nova Scotia

Greenville Station is a community in the Canadian province of Nova Scotia, located in Cumberland County.
