= West Brook, Nova Scotia =

Community in Nova Scotia, Canada

West Brook
- Location within Nova Scotia
- Coordinates: 45°33′24.4″N 64°17′57.5″W
- Country: Canada
- Province: Nova Scotia
- Municipality: Cumberland County
- Time zone: UTC-4 (AST)
- Postal code: B
- Area code: 902

West Brook is a community in the Canadian province of Nova Scotia, located in Cumberland County. Its main industries are agricultural: forestry and the harvesting of wild blueberries.
