= Shulie, Nova Scotia =

Community in Nova Scotia, Canada

Coordinates: 45°35′47.41″N 64°34′30.84″W

Shulie in Nova Scotia

Shulie is a community in the Canadian province of Nova Scotia, located in Cumberland County.

Once a thriving lumber town with a population of about 200 people (ca. 1900), today Shulie has a population of 2 people. The town has no significant evidence remaining of the old town other than a foundation along the creek. A dam, called "Big dam", was used to allow larger ships entrance to the area.
