= Stonehouse, Nova Scotia =

Community in Nova Scotia, Canada

Coordinates: 45°52′28.1″N 63°32′4.64″W

Stonehouse in Nova Scotia

Stonehouse is a community in the Canadian province of Nova Scotia, located in Cumberland County. It was probably named for Stonehouse, Plymouth in Devon, England.
