= Rose, Nova Scotia =

Community in Nova Scotia, Canada

Coordinates: 45°35′39.63″N 63°45′55.21″W

Rose in Nova Scotia

Rose is a community in the Canadian province of Nova Scotia, located in Cumberland County.
