= Brian Skabar =

Canadian politician

MLA for Cumberland North
- In office June 9, 2009 – October 8, 2013
- Preceded by: Ernie Fage
- Succeeded by: Terry Farrell

Personal details
- Born: February 25, 1952 (age 74) Winnipeg, Manitoba, Canada
- Party: New Democrat

Brian Skabar (born February 25, 1952) is a Canadian politician, who represented the riding of Cumberland North for the New Democratic Party from 2009 to 2013.

== Before politics ==
Skabar spent the majority of his government career as a social worker and also in management positions with Health Canada and Indigenous & Northern Affairs Canada, formerly known as Indian & Northern Affairs Canada.

== Political career ==
Skabar elected to the Nova Scotia House of Assembly in the 2009 provincial election. Skabar won the riding of Cumberland North for the New Democratic Party. He obtained 40 per cent of the popular vote and was the first NDP candidate ever elected in the district.

On June 29, 2009, Skabar was appointed Ministerial Assistant to the Nova Scotia Office of Aboriginal Affairs, and on March 15, 2013 he was appointed Ministerial Assistant of Intergovernmental Relations and Nova Scotia/New Brunswick Co-operation.

In the 2013 election, Skabar finished third in Cumberland North, losing the seat to Liberal Terry Farrell.

In the 2016 Amherst municipal election, Skabar ran for mayor, however he lost to David Kogan.

== Personal life ==
Skabar's daughter Lauren has run as MLA on behalf of the NDP in Cumberland North in 2021 and in Argyle in 2024.

== Electoral record ==
2024 Nova Scotia general election: Queens
Party	Candidate	Votes	%	±%
Progressive Conservative	Kim Masland	3,461	79.93	+9.56
Liberal	Cathy DeRome	487	11.25	-9.14
New Democratic	Brian Skabar	382	8.82	+2.56
Total		4,330	–	
Total rejected ballots		21		
Turnout		4,354	46.65	
Eligible voters		9,333		
Progressive Conservative hold		Swing		
Source: Elections Nova Scotia

2016 Amherst Mayoral Election
Mayoral candidate	Vote	%
David Kogon	1,630	41.30
George Baker	682	17.28
Wayne Bishop	538	13.63
Dale Fawthrop	416	10.54
Robert Bird	380	9.63
Brian Skabar	301	7.63

2013 Nova Scotia general election: Cumberland North
Party	Candidate	Votes	%	±%
Liberal	Terry Farrell	2,944	39.74	+26.14
Progressive Conservative	Judith Marie Giroux	2,212	29.86	+12.63
New Democratic	Brian Skabar	1,974	26.64	-13.55
Green	Jason Blanch	279	3.77	+2.16
Total valid votes		7,409	99.22	–
Total rejected ballots		58	0.78	–
Turnout		7,467	58.62	–
Eligible voters		12,737		
Source(s) Source: Electios Nova Scotia (2013). "Electoral History for Cumberland North" (PDF). electionsnovascotia.ca.

2009 Nova Scotia general election: Cumberland North
Party	Candidate	Votes	%	±%
New Democratic	Brian Skabar	3,170	40.19	25.54
Independent	Ernie Fage	2,159	27.37	–
Progressive Conservative	Keith Hunter	1,359	17.23	-45.41
Liberal	Brent Noiles	1,073	13.60	-6.38
Green	Aviva Silburt	127	1.61	-1.12
Total		7,888	–	
Source(s) Source: Nova Scotia Legislature (2021). "Electoral History for Cumberland North" (PDF). nslegislature.ca.
