= Victoria, Nova Scotia =

Community in Nova Scotia, Canada

Coordinates: 45°43′47.89″N 63°40′53.94″W

Victoria in Nova Scotia

Victoria is a community in the Canadian province of Nova Scotia, located in Cumberland County.

== See also ==
- Royal eponyms in Canada
