= Wyvern, Nova Scotia =

Community in Nova Scotia, Canada

Coordinates: 45°34′10.53″N 63°56′44.7″W

Wyvern in Nova Scotia

Wyvern is a community in the Canadian province of Nova Scotia, located in Cumberland County.
