= Farmington, Cumberland County =

Community in Nova Scotia, Canada

Coordinates: 45°33′51.5″N 63°53′43.64″W

Farmington in Nova Scotia

Farmington is a community in the Canadian province of Nova Scotia, located in Cumberland County. It was named for Farmington, Gloucestershire in England.
