= Cumberland North =

Provincial electoral district in Nova Scotia, Canada

Nova Scotia electoral district

Provincial electoral district
- Legislature: Nova Scotia House of Assembly
MLA
Elizabeth Smith-McCrossin
Independent
- District created: 1993
- First contested: 1993
- Last contested: 2024

Demographics
- Population (2011): 18,148
- Electors: 14,452
- Area (km²): 1,054
- Pop. density (per km²): 17.2
- Census division: Cumberland County
- Census subdivision(s): Amherst, Pugwash

Cumberland North is a provincial electoral district in Nova Scotia, Canada, that elects one member of the Nova Scotia House of Assembly. Prior to 1993, it was part of Cumberland East.

The communities of Amherst and Pugwash are within its boundaries.

== Geography ==
Cumberland North covers 1,054 km^{2} (407 sq mi).

== Members of the Legislative Assembly ==
This riding has elected the following members of the Legislative Assembly:

Cumberland North
Legislature	Years	Member	Party
Riding created from Cumberland East
56th	1993–1997	Ross Bragg	Liberal
56th	1997–1998	Ernest Fage	Progressive Conservative
57th	1997–1998	Ernest Fage	Progressive Conservative
58th	1999–2003	Ernest Fage	Progressive Conservative
59th	2003–2005	Ernest Fage	Progressive Conservative
60th	2006–2007	Ernest Fage	Progressive Conservative
60th	2007–2009	Ernest Fage	Independent
61st	2009–2013	Brian Skabar	New Democratic
62nd	2013–2017	Terry Farrell	Liberal
63rd	2017–2021	Elizabeth Smith-McCrossin	Progressive Conservative
63rd	2021–2021	Elizabeth Smith-McCrossin	Independent
64th	2021–2024	Elizabeth Smith-McCrossin	Independent
65th	2024–Present	Elizabeth Smith-McCrossin	Independent

== Election results ==
=== 2024 ===
2024 Nova Scotia general election
Party	Candidate	Votes	%	±%
Independent	Elizabeth Smith-McCrossin	3,567	55.29	+1.41
Progressive Conservative	Bill Dowe	2,194	34.00	+26.77
Liberal	Kurt Ditner	414	6.42	-25.23
New Democratic	Tyson Boyd	277	4.29	-2.95
Total		6,452	–	
Total rejected ballots		35		
Turnout		6,488	45.44	
Eligible voters		14,277		
Independent hold		Swing		
Source: Elections Nova Scotia

=== 2021 ===
2021 Nova Scotia general election
Party	Candidate	Votes	%	±%	Expenditures
Independent	Elizabeth Smith-McCrossin	4,235	53.87	+2.16^{1}	$61,145.93
Liberal	Bill Casey	2,488	31.65	-6.90	$51,915.80
Progressive Conservative	David Wightman	569	7.24	-44.47^{1}	$16,693.84
New Democratic	Lauren Skabar	569	7.24	+0.19	$23,023.94
Total valid votes/expense limit		7,861	99.43	-0.06	$79,940.53
Total rejected ballots		45	0.57	+0.06	
Turnout		7,906	58.59	+5.29	
Eligible voters		13,494			
Independent gain from Progressive Conservative		Swing		+4.53	
Source: Elections Nova Scotia

Notes

1. For both the 2009 and 2021 general elections in this riding, the results of both the Independent and Progressive Conservative candidates are compared to the PC total in the respective previous elections. In both races, the incumbent sought re-election as an independent after being elected as a PC MLA in the previous election.

=== 2017 ===
2017 Nova Scotia general election
Party	Candidate	Votes	%	±%
Progressive Conservative	Elizabeth Smith-McCrossin	3,639	51.71	+21.56
Liberal	Terry Farrell	2,713	38.55	-1.26
New Democratic	Earl Dow	496	7.05	-19.22
Independent	Richard Plett	106	1.51	
Atlantica	Bill Archer	84	1.19	
Total valid votes		7,031	100	
Total rejected ballots		36		
Turnout		7,067	53.3	
Eligible voters		13,259		
Progressive Conservative gain from Liberal		Swing		+11.41
Source: Elections Nova Scotia

=== 2013 ===
2013 Nova Scotia general election
Party	Candidate	Votes	%	±%
Liberal	Terry Farrell	2,944	39.74%	26.13%
Progressive Conservative	Judi Giroux	2,212	29.86%	12.63%
New Democratic	Brian Skabar	1,974	26.64%	-13.54%
Green	Jason M. Blanch	279	3.77%	2.16%
Total		7,409	–	
Source(s) Source: Nova Scotia Legislature (2024). "Electoral History for Cumberland North" (PDF). nslegislature.ca. Nova Scotia, Chief Electoral Officer (2013). 39th Provincial General Election, October 8, 2013: Volume 1 – Statement of Votes & Statistics (PDF) (Report). Elections Nova Scotia. Archived from the original (PDF) on 10 April 2018.

=== 2009 ===
2009 Nova Scotia general election
Party	Candidate	Votes	%	±%
New Democratic	Brian Skabar	3,170	40.19%	25.54%
Independent	Ernie Fage	2,159	27.37%	–
Progressive Conservative	Keith Hunter	1,359	17.23%	-45.41%
Liberal	Brent Noiles	1,073	13.60%	-6.38%
Green	Aviva Silburt	127	1.61%	-1.12%
Total		7,888	–	
Source(s) Source: Nova Scotia Legislature (2024). "Electoral History for Cumberland North" (PDF). nslegislature.ca.

=== 2006 ===
2006 Nova Scotia general election
Party	Candidate	Votes	%	±%
Progressive Conservative	Ernie Fage	4,640	62.64%	0.69%
Liberal	Bruce Alan Fage	1,480	19.98%	1.31%
New Democratic	Kim Cail	1,085	14.65%	-0.20%
Green	Darryl Gregory Whetter	202	2.73%	–
Total		7,407	–	
Source(s) Source: Nova Scotia Legislature (2024). "Electoral History for Cumberland North" (PDF). nslegislature.ca.

=== 2003 ===
2003 Nova Scotia general election
Party	Candidate	Votes	%	±%
Progressive Conservative	Ernie Fage	4,609	61.95%	-8.83%
Liberal	Marsh G. Fox	1,389	18.67%	-0.35%
New Democratic	Kim Cail	1,105	14.85%	4.65%
Independent	Jason M. Blanch	337	4.53%	–
Total		7,440	–	
Source(s) Source: Nova Scotia Legislature (2024). "Electoral History for Cumberland North" (PDF). nslegislature.ca.

=== 1999 ===
1999 Nova Scotia general election
Party	Candidate	Votes	%	±%
Progressive Conservative	Ernie Fage	5,936	70.78%	8.43%
Liberal	Kathy Langille	1,595	19.02%	-8.87%
New Democratic	Doug Wilson	856	10.21%	0.44%
Total		8,387	–	
Source(s) Source: Nova Scotia Legislature (2024). "Electoral History for Cumberland North" (PDF). nslegislature.ca. Nova Scotia, Chief Electoral Officer (1999). Returns of the General Election for the House of Assembly, Thirty-Fifth General Election (Report). Elections Nova Scotia.

=== 1998 ===
1998 Nova Scotia general election
Party	Candidate	Votes	%	±%
Progressive Conservative	Ernie Fage	5,451	62.35%	1.12%
Liberal	Russell Scott	2,438	27.89%	1.65%
New Democratic	Peter Stewart	854	9.77%	-2.76%
Total		8,743	–	
Source(s) Source: Nova Scotia Legislature (2024). "Electoral History for Cumberland North" (PDF). nslegislature.ca.

=== 1997 by-election ===
Nova Scotia provincial by-election, 1997-11-04
Party	Candidate	Votes	%	±%
Progressive Conservative	Ernie Fage	4,954	61.23%	20.59%
Liberal	Russell Scott	2,123	26.24%	-26.07%
New Democratic	Dorothy Jorgensen	1,014	12.53%	5.48%
Total		8,091	–	
Source(s) Source: Nova Scotia Legislature (2024). "Electoral History for Cumberland North" (PDF). nslegislature.ca. By-Election Returns 1997 (PDF) (Report). Elections Nova Scotia. 1997. Archived from the original (PDF) on 7 August 2021.

=== 1993 ===
1993 Nova Scotia general election
Party	Candidate	Votes	%	±%
Liberal	Ross Bragg	5,605	52.31%	–
Progressive Conservative	Ernie Fage	4,354	40.63%	–
New Democratic	Curtis L. Bird	756	7.06%	–
Total		10,715	–	
Source(s) Source: Nova Scotia Legislature (2024). "Electoral History for Cumberland North" (PDF). nslegislature.ca. Nova Scotia, Chief Electoral Officer (1993). Returns of the General Election for the House of Assembly, Thirty-Third General Election (PDF) (Report). Queen's Printer. Archived from the original (PDF) on 18 June 2018.

== See also ==
- List of Nova Scotia provincial electoral districts
- Canadian provincial electoral districts
