= First Baptist Church (Amherst, Nova Scotia) =

First Baptist Church (Amherst)
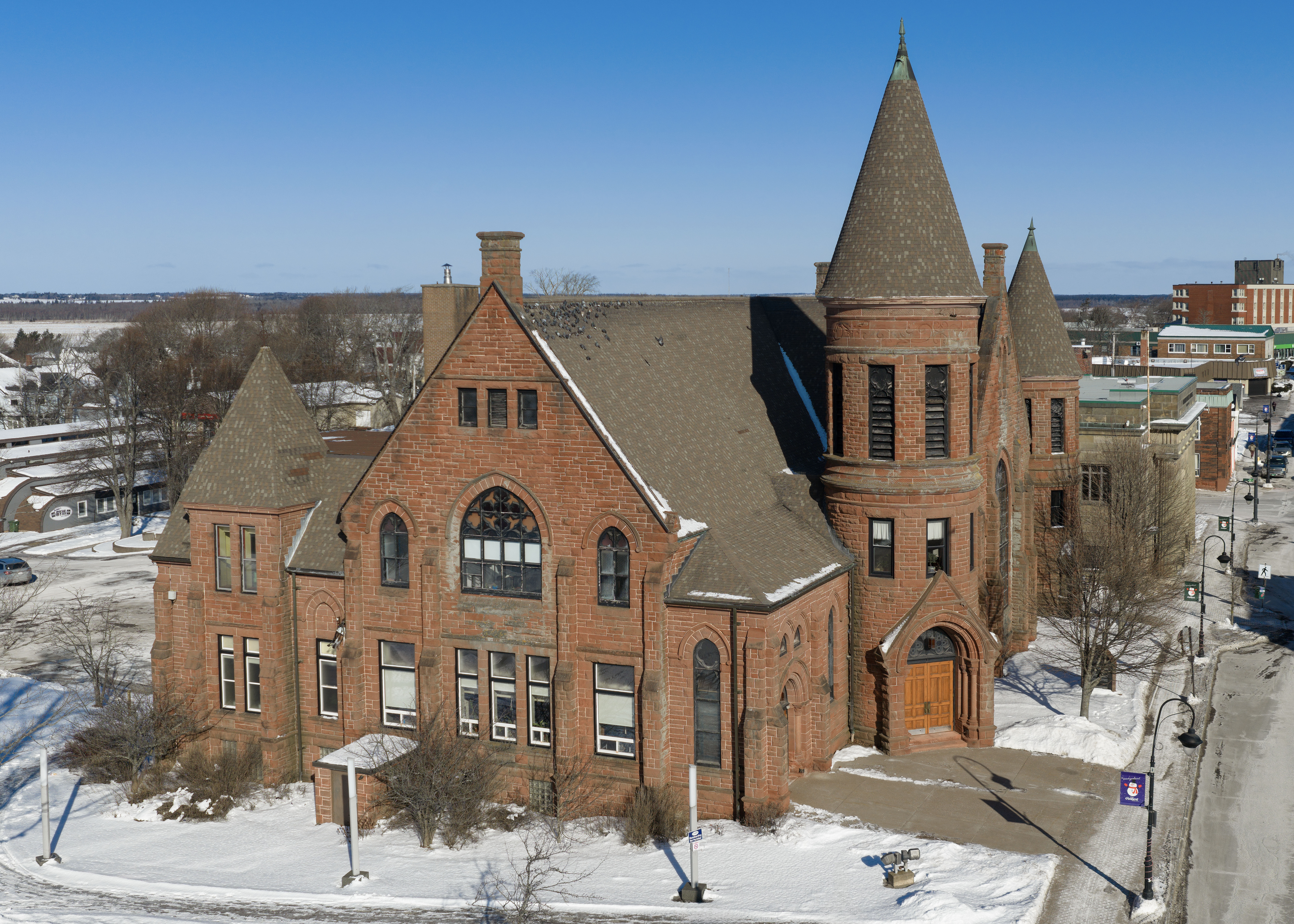
- First Baptist Church in 2026
- First Baptist Church (Amherst)
- 45.8339°N 64.2128°W
- Location: 66 Victoria Street East; Amherst, Nova Scotia; Canada
- Denomination: Baptist
- Website: firstbaptistamherst.com

First Baptist Church is a Baptist church in Amherst, Nova Scotia, Canada. The congregation is associated with the Canadian Baptists of Atlantic Canada.

== History ==
The congregation traces its history in Amherst to 1809. The current church building is a large red sandstone structure built in 1895. The building was designed by architect Harry H. Mott and built by Rhodes, Curry Co., with sandstone sourced from the Amherst Red Stone Quarry, which operated from 1889 to 1914.

== See also ==
- List of historic places in Cumberland County, Nova Scotia
