= Fenwick, Nova Scotia =

Community in Nova Scotia, Canada

Coordinates: 45°45′45.84″N 64°11′6.79″W

Fenwick in Nova Scotia

Fenwick is a community in the Canadian province of Nova Scotia, located in Cumberland County.
