= Amherst Internment Camp =

WWI POW camp in Nova Scotia

Coordinates: 45.819105°N 64.210772°W

Amherst Internment Camp was an internment camp that existed from 1914 to 1919 in Amherst, Nova Scotia. It was the largest internment camp in Canada during World War I; a maximum of 853 prisoners were housed at one time at the old Malleable Iron foundry on the corner of Hickman and Park Streets. The most famous prisoner at the camp was Leon Trotsky. There was a commemoration of the guards and prisoners for the 100th anniversary of the closing of the Amherst Internment Camp on July 2, 2019, at the Amherst Armoury.

== Camp ==
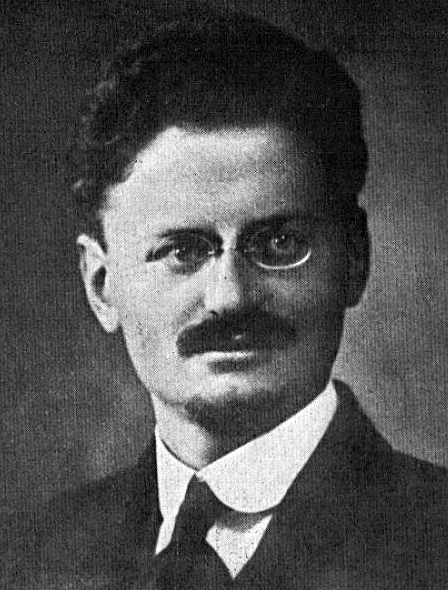
Leon Trotsky in 1917, Prisoner of War.

Of these eight hundred prisoners, about five hundred were sailors from German warships sunk by the Royal Navy; about two hundred were workers caught by the war in Canada, and a hundred more were officers and wealthy civilian prisoners.

Trotsky and his family were living in exile in New York City during World War I and decided in 1917 he wanted to return to Russia. His return ship, SS Kristianiafjord, temporarily docked in the Halifax Harbour. On April 3, 1917, Trotsky was detained at the Citadel, and shortly thereafter was brought to the Amherst Internment Camp (Trotsky's wife, Natalia Sedova, and his children remained in Halifax at a hotel, reporting daily to the police station). Trotsky referred to the camp as a concentration camp.

He wrote about the camp commanders' attempts to block his mobilization of the other prisoners to join the Russian Revolution, writing:

The whole month I was there was like one continuous mass meeting. I told the prisoners about the Russian revolution, about Liebknecht, about Lenin... the British colonel... forbade me to make any more public speeches. But this did not happen until the last few days of our stay at the camp, and served only to cement my friendship with the sailors and workers, who responded to the colonel's order by a written protest bearing five hundred and thirty signatures. A plebiscite like this, carried out in the very face of Sergeant Olsen's heavy-handed supervision, was more than ample compensation for all the hardships of the Amherst imprisonment.
