= Barronsfield =

Community in Nova Scotia, Canada

Coordinates: 45°45′4.88″N 64°20′47.07″W

Barronsfield in Nova Scotia

Barronsfield is a community in the Canadian province of Nova Scotia, located in Cumberland County. It is named after Captain Edward Barron.
