= Pugwash Junction =

Community in Nova Scotia, Canada

Coordinates: 45°47′39″N 63°37′46″W

Pugwash Junction is a Canadian rural community in Cumberland County, Nova Scotia.

The community was established in 1887 after the Oxford & New Glasgow Railway built its line along the north shore of Nova Scotia from the Intercolonial Railway (ICR) at Oxford Junction to Pictou. The short connecting line to Pugwash from the Oxford & New Glasgow was constructed between 1882 and 1890, first as part of the European & North American Railway project, and later by the Great American & European Short Line Railway Co. before being reorganized as the O&NG.

Pugwash Junction in Nova Scotia

The ICR took over the O&NG in the early 1890s and in later years it was operated as CN Rail's Oxford Subdivision, with the line from Pugwash Junction to Pugwash being the Pugwash Spur.

The community is the birthplace of famous American industrialist Cyrus Eaton.
