= Little River, Cumberland County, Nova Scotia =

Community in Nova Scotia, Canada

Coordinates: 45°46′50.5″N 63°55′13.86″W

Little River in Nova Scotia

Little River is a community in the Canadian province of Nova Scotia, located in Cumberland County.
