= Jacksons Point, Nova Scotia =

Locality in Nova Scotia, Canada

Coordinates: 45°59′51.64″N 64°2′17.8″W

Jacksons Point in Nova Scotia

Jacksons Point is a locality in the Canadian province of Nova Scotia, located in Cumberland County.
