= Always Fresh =

2006 book by Ron Joyce and Robert Thompson

Always Fresh: The Untold Story of Tim Hortons by the Man Who Created a Canadian Empire
- Author: Ron Joyce; Robert Thompson
- Language: English
- Genre: Autobiography
- Publisher: HarperCollins
- Publication date: May 10, 2006
- Publication place: United States
- Media type: Print (Hardback)
- Pages: 320
- ISBN: 978-0-00-200757-3

Always Fresh: The Untold Story of Tim Hortons by the Man Who Created a Canadian Empire is an autobiography of Tim Hortons written by Ron Joyce. It covers the time from the inception as a single coffee shop until his retirement from the company, which grew into a large fast-food franchise.

== Publication ==
Joyce and Robert Thompson wrote the book, with business details about the expansion of Tim Hortons coffee shops in Canada, the authors included related anecdotes and some of Joyce's personal stories from his time with the company. It was published by HarperCollins in 2006.

== Reception ==
The book was reviewed by Maclean's magazine, Canadian Business and The Star. It was criticized as providing an overly rosy picture of events and conditions in the company.

== See also ==
- List of autobiographies
