= Wallace Ridge, Nova Scotia =

Community in Nova Scotia, Canada

Coordinates: 45°47′5.58″N 63°24′50.82″W

Wallace Ridge in Nova Scotia

Wallace Ridge is a community in the Canadian province of Nova Scotia, located in Cumberland County.
