= Apple River, Nova Scotia =

Community in Nova Scotia, Canada

Apple River
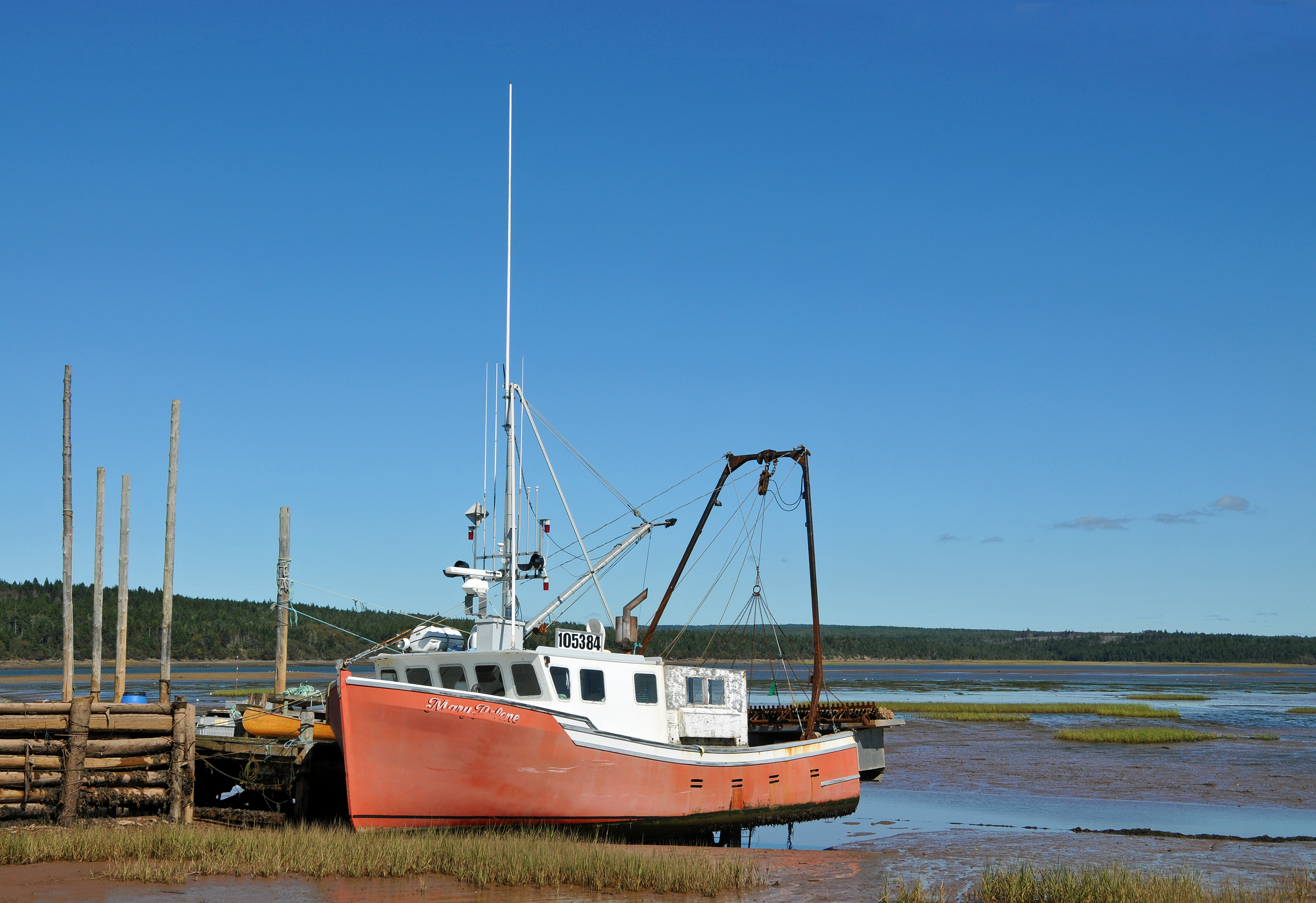

- Location within Nova Scotia
- Coordinates: 45°27′41″N 64°47′09″W
- Country: Canada
- Province: Nova Scotia
- Municipality: Cumberland
- Time zone: UTC-4 (AST)
  - Summer (DST): UTC-3 (ADT)
- Postal code: B0M 1S0
- Area code: 902
- GNBC Code: CAATQ

Apple River is a community in the Canadian province of Nova Scotia, located in Cumberland County.

The community is located on two sides of the Apple River, a small river which widens dramatically to produce a large, shallow tidal harbour facing Chignecto Bay, an arm of the Bay of Fundy. The river and harbour are bordered by extensive tidal salt marshes, protected by Cape Capstan to the East and a long sand bar to the west. The two sides of the harbour are known as East Apple River and West Apple River. Apple River is located on Route 209 and one of the communities that form the Fundy Shore Ecotour. A tidal, small craft harbour at the end of the bar serves as base to several small commercial fishing boats. A small grass air strip known as the Apple River Airport is located in West Apple River.

The area was known to the Mi'kmaq as Agoomakun, meaning place of abundant Herring. Current settlement dates the United Empire Loyalist migration after the American Revolution. Circa 1783 several Loyalist families from the United States settled at Apple River including Robert Dove, Hugh Pudsey and Joseph Elderkin. Apple River had one of the first lighthouses in the Upper Bay of Fundy, established in 1848 at the tip of Cape Capstan. The family tree of Fowler indicates John Fowler 1785-1866 served as an early lighthouse keeper and is buried in Apple River, Nova Scotia. Lumbering led the community to grow in the late 19th century until local stands were exhausted. At least 14 vessels were built at Apple River between 1845 and 1909.

The River and community are believed to be named after an old stand of apple trees, although some sources attribute the name to the wreck of a ship carrying apples which left the shoreline strewn with apples.

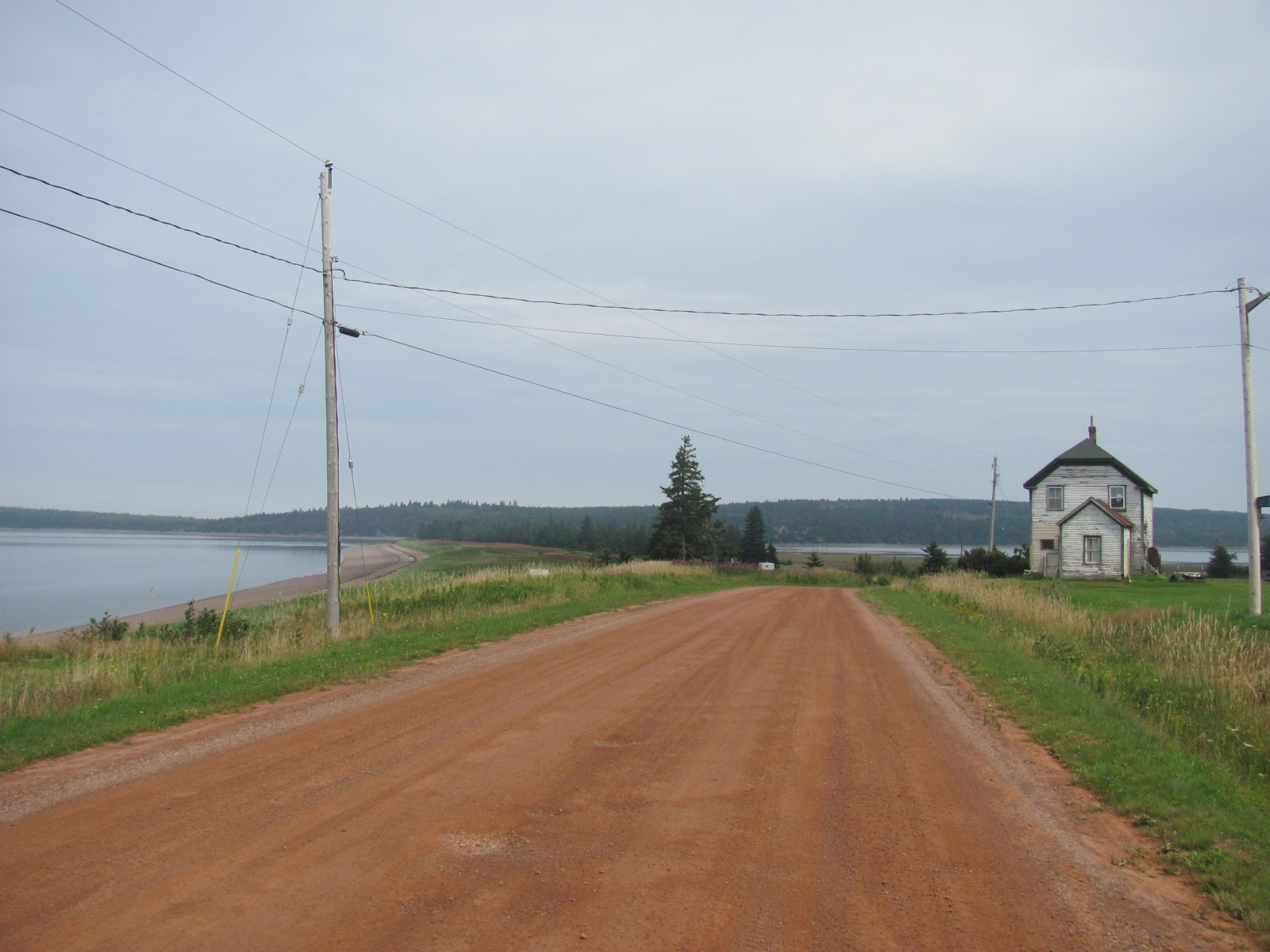
West Apple River at the bar
