= Southbrook =

Southbrook may refer to:

== Australia ==
- Southbrook, Queensland, a town and locality in the Toowoomba Region

== New Zealand ==
- Southbrook, New Zealand, a suburb of Rangiora in North Canterbury

== United Kingdom ==
- Southbrook, Monmouthshire, Wales
- Southbrook, Wiltshire, England

== United States ==
- Southbrook Township, Cottonwood County, Minnesota

== See also ==
- South Brook (disambiguation)
