= Hansford, Nova Scotia =

Community in Nova Scotia, Canada

Coordinates: 45°43′16″N 63°45′45″W

Hansford in Nova Scotia

Hansford is a community in the Canadian province of Nova Scotia, located in Cumberland County.
