= New Salem, Nova Scotia =

Community in Nova Scotia, Canada

Coordinates: 45°25′20.32″N 64°47′23.32″W

New Salem in Nova Scotia

New Salem is a community in the Canadian province of Nova Scotia, located in Cumberland County .
