= West Leicester, Nova Scotia =

Community in Nova Scotia, Canada

Coordinates: 45°46′44″N 64°2′35″W

West Leicester in Nova Scotia

West Leicester is a farming community in the Canadian province of Nova Scotia, located in Cumberland County. Approximately 22 km East of the NB border, it is the home of Leicester Volunteer Fire Department, known for its annual Easter pancake and maple brunch fundraiser.
