= Slade Lake =

Lake in Nova Scotia, Canada

Coordinates: 45°42′54″N 63°54′45″W

- Interactive map of Slade Lake
- Location: Cumberland County, Nova Scotia, Canada
- Type: Lake
- Basin countries: Canada

Slade Lake, also known as Dry Lake, is a lake in Cumberland County, Nova Scotia, located around 5 kilometers southwest of the town of Oxford. Part of the area surrounding the lake is a nature reserve, as it is home to several rare plant species such as the eastern white cedar tree, as well as being home to sinkholes and vernal pools. Most of the lake was drained in the summer of 2020, believed to be the result of a layer of gypsum eroding. The draining of the lake resulted in the death of most of its life, including hundreds of freshwater mussels as well as the possible reveal of a cave. The lake is known to empty periodically, but rarely ever to this magnitude, with the last time it draining so far being in the 1970s. The cause of the sinkholes is believed to be the same underground formation that caused the 2018 Oxford sinkhole. It is currently unknown where the water has gone, but is suspected to be going into caves and fractures.
