= Conns Mills =

Community in Nova Scotia, Canada

Coordinates: 45°45′12.21″N 63°41′33.18″W

Conns Mills in Nova Scotia

Conns Mills is a community in the Canadian province of Nova Scotia, located in Cumberland County.
