= North Shore, Cumberland County =

Community in Nova Scotia, Canada

Coordinates: 45°47′45.22″N 63°21′42.33″W

North Shore in Nova Scotia

North Shore is a community in the Canadian province of Nova Scotia, located in Cumberland County.
