= Minudie =

Community in Nova Scotia, Canada

Coordinates: 45°46′28.52″N 64°21′41.45″W

Minudie in Nova Scotia

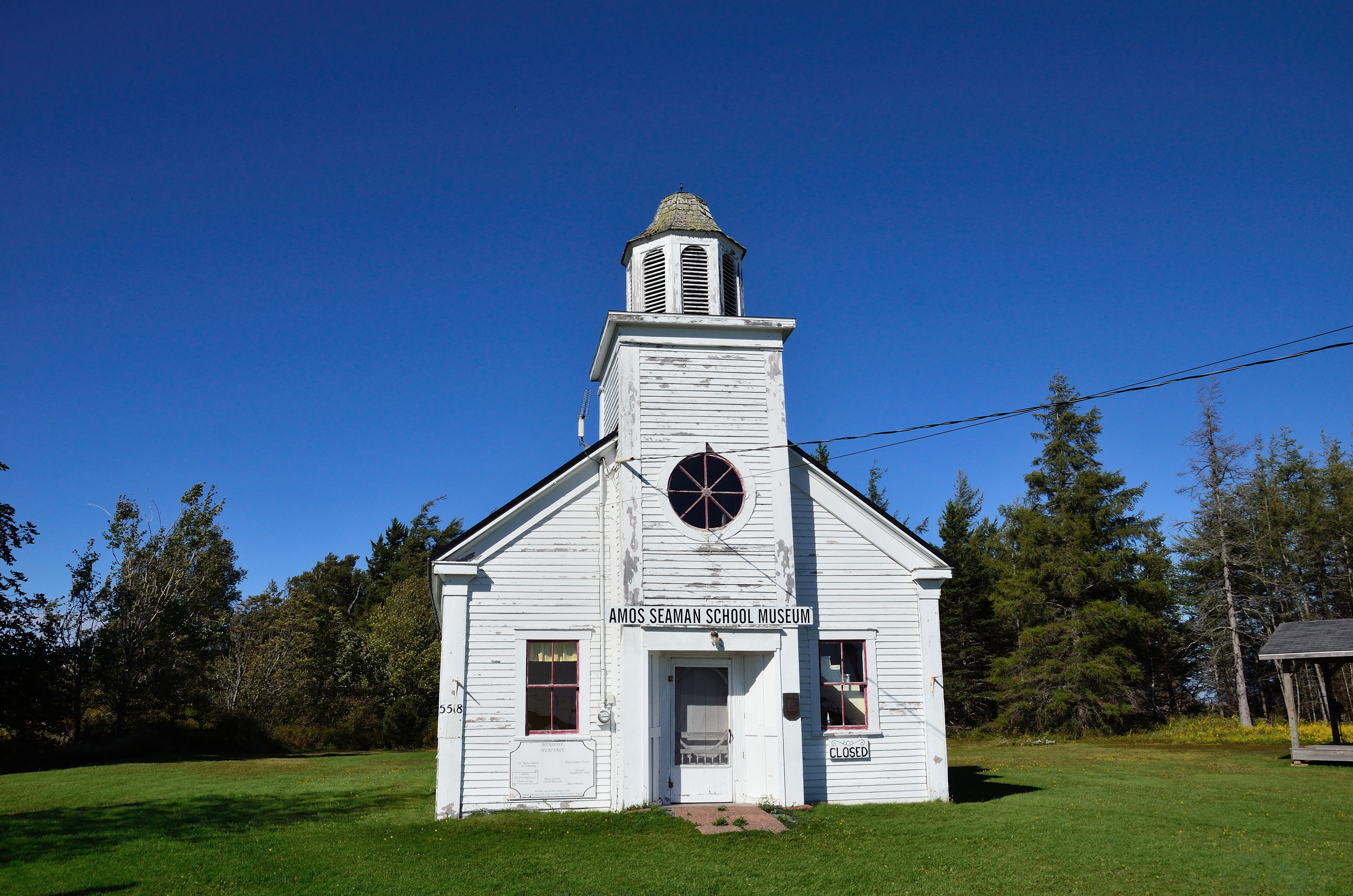
Amos Seaman School Museum in Minudie

Minudie is a community in the Canadian province of Nova Scotia, located in Cumberland County about 8 kilometres (5.0 mi) from River Hebert.

The name possibly derives from a Mi'kmaq word, "Menoodek", meaning "a small bay." A fanciful derivation for the name is "Main a Dieu", meaning "God's Hand." The Mi'kmaq word "Munoodek" means "a sack" or "a bag" and the name may have been derived from this word.

Once a thriving town with a population peaking about 1870 at more than 600 people, Minudie today still has three churches but a population of just 20. Industries included shipbuilding, farming, lumbering and the manufacture of grindstones. It was settled, dyked, and farmed by Acadians in the eighteenth century. After the expulsion, the lands were granted to J.F.W. DesBarres, who leased it to displaced Acadians and others who farmed the marshlands, and cut grindstones along the shore. Amos Seaman (1788–1864), the self-appointed "Grindstone King", assumed control of the grindstone quarries there about 1826 and was also largely responsible for the rest of the industries there as well.
