= East Mapleton =

Community in Nova Scotia, Canada

Coordinates: 45°33′24.24″N 64°6′42.29″W

East Mapleton in Nova Scotia

East Mapleton is a community in the Canadian province of Nova Scotia, located in Cumberland County. It was the birthplace of the Canadian writer Will R. Bird.
