= Shinimicas Bridge =

Locality in Nova Scotia, Canada

Coordinates: 45°52′22.94″N 63°54′54.7″W

Shinimicas Bridge in Nova Scotia

Shinimicas Bridge is a locality in the Canadian province of Nova Scotia, located in Cumberland County. There is lower Shinimicas and Upper Shinimicas. In Shinimicas there are many horse stables and small community gathering places.

The name "Shinimicas" derives from a Mi'kmaq word, meaning "shining river".
