= Terry Farrell (politician) =

Canadian politician

Member of the Nova Scotia House of Assembly for Cumberland North
- In office October 8, 2013 – May 30, 2017
- Preceded by: Brian Skabar
- Succeeded by: Elizabeth Smith-McCrossin

Personal details
- Born: December 19, 1960 (age 65) Amherst, Nova Scotia, Canada
- Party: Liberal
- Occupation: Lawyer

Terry Farrell (born December 19, 1960) is a Canadian politician, who was elected to the Nova Scotia House of Assembly in the 2013 provincial election. A member of the Nova Scotia Liberal Party, he represented the electoral district of Cumberland North until his defeat in 2017.

== Electoral record ==
2017 Nova Scotia general election: Cumberland North
Party	Candidate	Votes	%	±%
Progressive Conservative	Elizabeth Smith-McCrossin	3,639	51.71	+21.56
Liberal	Terry Farrell	2,713	38.55	-1.26
New Democratic	Earl Dow	496	7.05	-19.22
Independent	Richard Plett	106	1.51	
Atlantica	Bill Archer	84	1.19	
Total valid votes		7,031	100	
Total rejected ballots		36		
Turnout		7,067	53.3	
Eligible voters		13,259		
Progressive Conservative gain from Liberal		Swing		+11.41
Source: Elections Nova Scotia

2013 Nova Scotia general election
Party	Candidate	Votes	%	±%
Liberal	Terry Farrell	2,944	39.81	
Progressive Conservative	Judith Marie Giroux	2,230	30.15	
New Democratic Party	Brian Skabar	1,943	26.27	
Green	Jason Blanch	279	3.77	
