= Chapman Settlement =

Community in Nova Scotia, Canada

Coordinates: 45°56′46.95″N 63°55′54.03″W

Chapman Settlement in Nova Scotia

Chapman Settlement is a community in the Canadian province of Nova Scotia, located in Cumberland County.

Chapman House National Historic Site of Canada Chapman Road, Cumberland, Subdistrict C, Nova Scotia, B4H, Canada Formally Recognized: 1968/11/28
