= Fox Harb'r Golf Resort & Spa =

Golf-focused resort in Nova Scotia, Canada

Fox Harb'r
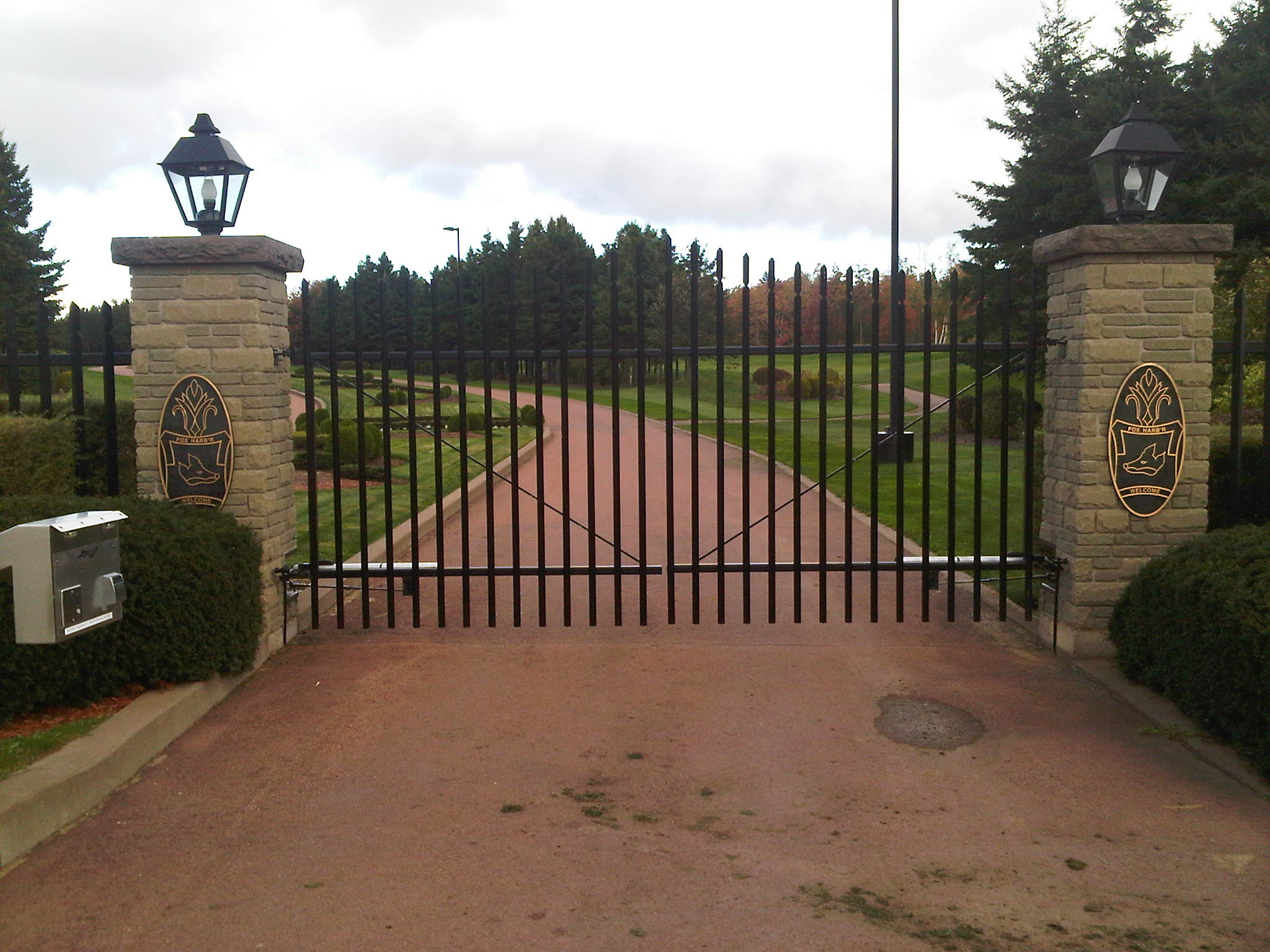
- Entrance gate to Fox Harb'r Resort

- Location in Nova Scotia
- 45°52′1″N 63°27′8″W

Club information
- Type: Private
- Owner: Ron Joyce
- Tota holes: 18
- Website: www.foxharbr.com
- Designed by: Graham Cooke
- Par: 72
- Length: 7,205
- Course record: 63 - Tiger Woods (2009)

Fox Harb'r Golf Resort & Spa is a golf-focused resort in Fox Harbour, Nova Scotia, Canada. The 1,100-acre (450-hectare) property was owned by Canadian businessman Ron Joyce (co-founder of Tim Hortons) and opened in 2000. The course was designed by Graham Cooke and has a par of 72. In addition to the course, the resort has a spa, marina, hunting lodge, winery, and private air strip.

== History ==
Joyce acquired the 1,100 acres of ocean-front for the property in 1987, and opened it in 2000. The remnants of a lobster-processing plant from the property's previous use are visible from the back-nine holes of the course. The resort was originally envisioned to be a gated community centred on the golf course. Houses or townhouses would be privately owned and occupied by either permanent or seasonal residents, but the resort eventually evolved into a combination of "private club and public golf".

== Golf course ==
The golf course is 250 acres (100 hectares) and was designed by Graham Cooke; in 2001 Golf Digest awarded it Best New Canadian Course, and in 2009 listed it as the number fifteen in their top-twenty golf courses in Canada. The 7,205-yard, par 72 course follows the coast of the Northumberland Strait of the Gulf of St. Lawrence.

In 2010, the course saw approximately 7,000 rounds of golf played. At a private event in 2009 Tiger Woods shot the course record, a 63.

== Facilities ==
The Fox Harb'r Resort includes a spa and conference centre. It is accessed by the road that was dubbed 'Amazing Grace Boulevard' by Ron Joyce, or the 4,885-foot (1,489-metre) private air strip. While serving as Canadian ambassador to the United States, Frank McKenna used the Fox Harb'r facilities for an annual summer event (known as the Frank McKenna Networking Event) he organized to bring together business-people from around the Maritime Provinces. The resort also has a deepwater marina and a lodge for game bird hunting

== See also ==
- List of golf courses in Nova Scotia
