= Amherst Head =

Community in Nova Scotia, Canada

Coordinates: 45°53′1.66″N 64°0′7.87″W

Amherst Head in Nova Scotia

Amherst Head is a community in the Canadian province of Nova Scotia, located in Cumberland County.

According to the book Place-Names and Places of Nova Scotia, Amherst Head is "located on the road from Amherst to Pugwash, west of Pugwash. Among the grantees were Dixon and John Trenholm, 1818 and Jonathan Tindell and Barnet Webb, 1820. A way office was established in 1852 and a school built in 1873. The population in 1856 was 156."

In 2005, Heritage Gas built a 17.6 km natural gas pipeline through Amherst Head to Amherst, NS. In 2004, Sunrise Swine Genetics built a hog farm in Amherst Head. The community is rural, with an abundance of natural wildlife.
