= Salt Springs, Cumberland County =

Community in Canada

Coordinates: 45°40′11.01″N 63°59′44.54″W

Salt Springs in Nova Scotia

Salt Springs is a small community in the Canadian province of Nova Scotia, in Cumberland County.
