= 2016 Nova Scotia municipal elections =

- October 15, 2016

Municipal and school board elections were held in the Canadian province of Nova Scotia on October 15, 2016. Here is a summary of the mayoral results in the major communities in the province and the council results for the four largest municipalities.

== Amherst ==
Mayoral candidate	Vote	%
David Kogon	1,630	41.30
George Baker	682	17.28
Wayne Bishop	538	13.63
Dale Fawthrop	416	10.54
Robert Bird	380	9.63
Brian Skabar	301	7.63

== Bridgewater ==
Mayoral candidate	Vote	%
David Mitchell	1,348	53.28
David Walker (X)	960	37.94
Greg Ritcey	222	8.77

== Cape Breton Regional Municipality ==
Mayoral candidate	Vote	%
Cecil Clarke (X)	22,250	51.55
Rankin MacSween	20,911	48.45

=== Cape Breton Regional Council ===
Candidate	Vote	%
District 1
Clarence Prince (X)	1,982	49.00
Gordon MacDonald	1,675	41.41
Duke Pero	388	9.59
District 2
Earlene MacMullin	985	23.49
Lloyd Wilkie	980	23.37
Diane Power	966	23.03
Clayton Smith	663	15.81
Bill MacDonald	465	11.09
Wally March	135	3.22
District 3
Blue Marshall	1,189	35.98
Cyril MacDonald	689	20.85
Tom Vickers	584	17.67
Jim Clark	546	16.52
Michael MacNeil	177	5.36
André Desjardins Jr.	120	3.63
District 4
Steve Gillespie	1,325	34.90
Darlene Morrison	745	19.62
Darrell Wilson	702	18.49
Dave LeBlanc	691	18.20
Richard Fogarty	334	8.80
District 5
Eldon MacDonald (X)	1,530	45.63
Tom Wilson	839	25.02
Shawn Lesnick	408	12.17
Nigel Kearns	313	9.33
Nadine Bernard	263	7.84
District 6
Ray Paruch (X)	2,411	66.90
Roberta Lynch	862	23.92
Paul R. Theriault	331	9.18
District 7
Ivan Doncaster (X)	1,767	54.94
Rob MacNeill	924	28.73
Joe Ward	525	16.32
District 8
Amanda McDougall	1,576	50.89
Kevin Saccary (X)	1,521	49.11
District 9
George MacDonald (X)	1,579	45.44
Clarence Routledge	603	17.35
Steven James MacNeil	575	16.55
Seward Bonaparte	515	14.82
Lois MacDougall	203	5.84
District 10
Darren Bruckschwaiger	2,426	55.63
Brian Shaw	1,266	29.03
Dave Wilson	669	15.34
District 11
Kendra Coombes	2,106	55.38
Lowell Cormier (X)	1,697	44.62
District 12
Jim MacLeod (X)	1,460	50.98
Kim Sheppard	1,181	41.24
Tera Camus	223	7.79

== Colchester County ==
Mayoral candidate	Vote	%
Christine Blair	3,051	53.02
Bob Taylor (X)	2,703	46.98

=== Colchester County Municipal Council ===
Candidate	Vote	%
District 1
Eric Boutlier	Acclaimed	
District 2
Bill Masters (X)	567	82.77
Shawn Duffy	118	17.23
District 3
Geoff Stewart (X)	Acclaimed	
District 4
Mike Cooper (X)	Acclaimed	
District 5
Lloyd Gibbs (X)	Acclaimed	
District 6
Karen MacKenzie (X)	Acclaimed	
District 7
Michael Gregory (X)	Acclaimed	
District 8
Ron Cavanaugh (X)	Acclaimed	
District 9
Doug MacInnes (X)	Acclaimed	
District 10
Tom Taggart (X)	Acclaimed	
District 11
Wade Parker (X)	416	50.79
Tom Burke	403	49.21

=== District 9 special election ===
Held on October 21, 2017.

Council candidate	Vote	%
Bob Pash	379	61.23
Bob White	240	38.77

== Halifax Regional Municipality ==
Mayoral candidate	Vote	%
Mike Savage (X)	61,875	68.43
Lil MacPherson	28,543	31.57

== Kentville ==
Mayoral candidate	Vote	%
Sandra Snow	1,850	70.18
Dave Corkum (X)	786	29.82

== Kings County ==
Kings County will be holding mayoral elections for the first time, in addition to elections for municipal council.

Mayoral candidate	Vote	%
Peter Muttart	5,683	51.09
Dick Killam	3,268	29.38
Rick Ackland	1,133	10.19
Laurie Porter	1,039	9.34

=== Kings County Municipal Council ===
Candidate	Vote	%
District 1
Meg Hodges	1,006	63.43
Michael Embree	580	36.57
District 2
Pauline Raven (X)	833	74.04
Deanna O'Neil	292	25.96
District 3
Brian Hirtle (X)	1,115	72.40
Ray Savage	425	27.60
District 4
Martha Armstrong	603	54.28
Wayne Atwater (X)	508	45.72
District 5
Paul Spicer	395	33.73
Diana Brothers (X)	303	25.88
Jeffery Robar	238	20.32
Ted Palmer	235	20.07
District 6
Bob Best (X)	750	55.60
Sandy Buchan	599	44.40
District 7
Emily Lutz	810	72.26
Hugh Curry	220	19.63
Richard Nickerson	91	8.12
District 8
Jim Winsor (X)	890	73.74
Quentin Hill	317	26.26
District 9
Peter Allen	698	66.48
Dan Sparkman	352	33.52

== District of the Municipality of Lunenburg ==
Mayoral candidate	Vote	%
Carolyn Bolivar-Getson	4,256	50.92
Tom Lockwood	4,102	49.08

== New Glasgow ==
Mayoral candidate	Vote	%
Nancy Dicks	1,796	45.42
Henderson Paris	1,693	42.82
Ken Langille	268	6.78
Mark Firth	197	4.98

== Region of Queens Municipality ==
Mayoral candidate	Vote	%
David Dagley	1,573	48.43
Christopher Clarke (X)	1,271	39.13
Scott Costen	404	12.44

== Truro ==
Mayoral candidate	Vote	%
Bill Mills (X)	1,827	42.72
Keltie Jones	1,782	41.66
Raymond Tynes	428	10.01
Al McNutt	240	5.61

== Yarmouth (Town) ==
Mayoral Candidate	Vote	%
Pam Mood (X)	2,010	68.44
Charles A. Crosby	753	25.64
Doris Powell	174	5.92
