= 42nd Battalion (Royal Highlanders of Canada), CEF =

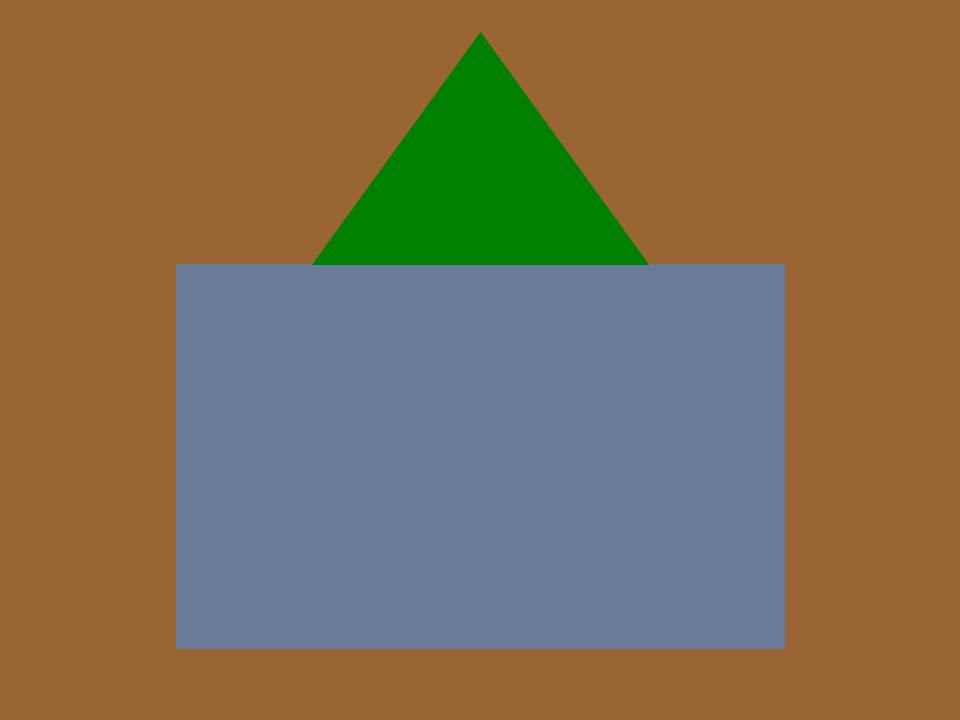
- Distinguishing patch of the battalion
- Active: 7 November 1914–15 September 1920
- Country: Canada
- Branch: Canadian Expeditionary Force
- Type: Infantry
- Size: Battalion
- Mobilization headquarters: Montreal
- Battle honours: Mount Sorrel; Somme, 1916; Flers–Courcelette; Ancre Heights; Arras, 1917, '18; Vimy, 1917; Arleux; Hill 70; Ypres, 1917; Passchendaele; Amiens; Scarpe, 1918; Hindenburg Line; Canal du Nord; Pursuit to Mons; France and Flanders, 1915–18

The 42nd Battalion (Royal Highlanders of Canada), CEF, was an infantry battalion of the Canadian Expeditionary Force during the Great War.

== History ==
The 42nd Battalion was authorized on 7 November 1914 and embarked for Great Britain on 10 June 1915. It disembarked in France on 9 October 1915, where it fought as part of the 7th Canadian Brigade, 3rd Canadian Division in France and Flanders until the end of the war. The battalion was disbanded on 15 September 1920.

The 42nd Battalion recruited in and was mobilized at Montreal.

The 42nd Battalion had five officers commanding:

- Lt-Col. G.S. Cantlie, 10 June 1915 – 24 December 1916
- Maj. R.L.H. Ewing, 24 December 1916 – 2 January 1917
- Maj. S.C. Norsworthy, 2 January 1917 – 6 April 1917
- Lt-Col. B. McLennan, DSO, 6 April 1917 – 3 August 1918
- Lt-Col. R.L.H. Ewing, DSO, MC, 3 August 1918-Demobilization

One member of the 42nd Battalion was awarded the Victoria Cross. Private (later Lieutenant) Thomas Dinesen was awarded the Victoria Cross for his actions on 12 August 1918 at Parvillers, France.

The novelist Will R. Bird was a member of the battalion, and wrote two books of memoirs on his war experiences: And We Go On and Ghosts Have Warm Hands.

American author and playwright Robert E. Sherwood enlisted in the 42nd Battalion after the United States Army rejected him as being too tall. He was wounded twice in France.

== Battle honours ==
The 42nd Battalion was awarded the following battle honours:

- MOUNT SORREL
- SOMME, 1916
- Flers-Courcelette
- Ancre Heights
- ARRAS, 1917, '18
- Vimy, 1917
- Arleux
- HILL 70
- Ypres, 1917
- Passchendaele
- AMIENS
- SCARPE, 1918
- HINDENBURG LINE
- Canal du Nord
- PURSUIT TO MONS
- FRANCE AND FLANDERS, 1915–18

== Perpetuation ==
The 42nd Battalion (Royal Highlanders of Canada), CEF, is perpetuated by The Black Watch (Royal Highland Regiment) of Canada.

== See also ==
- List of infantry battalions in the Canadian Expeditionary Force

== Sources ==
- Canadian Expeditionary Force 1914-1919 by Col. G.W.L. Nicholson, CD, Queen's Printer, Ottawa, Ontario, 1962
- Beresford, Charles (1931). The 42nd Battalion C.E.F. Royal Highlanders of Canada.
