= South Brook, Nova Scotia =

Community in Nova Scotia, Canada

Coordinates: 45°33′49.76″N 64°10′45.78″W

South Brook in Nova Scotia

South Brook is a community in the Canadian province of Nova Scotia, located in Cumberland County.
