= Moose River, Cumberland County =

Community in Nova Scotia, Canada

Coordinates: 45°25′4.16″N 64°10′54.12″W

Moose River in Nova Scotia

Moose River is a community in the Canadian province of Nova Scotia, located in Cumberland County.
