= Mapleton, Nova Scotia =

Community in Nova Scotia, Canada

Coordinates: 45°34′53.79″N 64°8′49.6″W

Mapleton in Nova Scotia

Mapleton is a community in the Canadian province of Nova Scotia, located in Cumberland County.
