= River Philip, Nova Scotia =

Community in Nova Scotia, Canada

Coordinates: 45°40′28″N 63°55′57″W

River Philip is a rural community in the Canadian province of Nova Scotia, located in Cumberland County. It was founded by George Oxley. The centre of the community is located near the intersection of Route 321 and Wyvern Road.

It is situated in a small valley formed by the River Philip, from which it derives its name.
