= Mount Pleasant, Cumberland County, Nova Scotia =

Community in Nova Scotia, Canada

Coordinates: 45°47′52.12″N 63°50′35.15″W

Mount Pleasant in Nova Scotia

Mount Pleasant is a community in the Canadian province of Nova Scotia, located in Cumberland County.
