= Mill Creek, Cumberland County =

Locality in Nova Scotia, Canada

Coordinates: 45°45′37.65″N 64°23′10.44″W

Mill Creek in Nova Scotia

Mill Creek is a locality in the Canadian province of Nova Scotia, located in Cumberland County.
