= Williamsdale, Nova Scotia =

Community in Nova Scotia, Canada

Coordinates: 45°36′7.74″N 63°53′48.58″W

Williamsdale in Nova Scotia

Williamsdale is a community in the Canadian province of Nova Scotia, located in Cumberland County.
