= Gulf Shore, Nova Scotia =

Community in Nova Scotia, Canada

Coordinates: 45°52′23.14″N 63°37′31.55″W

Gulf Shore in Nova Scotia

Gulf Shore is a community in the Canadian province of Nova Scotia, located in Cumberland County.

The population fluctuates from winter to summer, with only a few year-round residents. The main employment is in agriculture and tourism. The Gulf Shore is the location for the Northumberland Links Golf Course.
