= Elizabeth Smith-McCrossin =

Canadian politician

Elizabeth Smith-McCrossin MLA BScN MBA

Member of the Nova Scotia House of Assembly for Cumberland North
- Incumbent
- Assumed office May 30, 2017
- Preceded by: Terry Farrell

Personal details
- Born: Elizabeth Anne Smith; September 7, 1969 (age 57) Linden, Nova Scotia, Canada
- Party: Independent (2021–present)
- Other political affiliations: Progressive Conservative (2017–2021)
- Spouse: Murray McCrossin
- Education: Dalhousie University (BScN) Saint Mary's University (MBA)
- Occupation: Politician • Businesswoman Nurse
- Website: https://elizabethsmithmccrossin.ca/

Elizabeth Smith-McCrossin (born September 7, 1969) is a Canadian politician who has served as a member of the Nova Scotia House of Assembly, representing the electoral district of Cumberland North since 2017. Initially elected as a member of the Progressive Conservative Party, she left the party in 2021 and has since been reelected as an independent in the last two general elections.

== Early life and education ==
Smith-McCrossin was born and raised on a dairy farm in Linden, Nova Scotia. She graduated from Dalhousie University in 1991 with a bachelor of science in nursing. She earned an executive MBA from Saint Mary's University in 2013.

== Politics ==
Smith-McCrossin was elected to the Nova Scotia House of Assembly in the 2017 provincial election. She was a member of the Progressive Conservative party until ousted on June 24, 2021, for failing to accept responsibility and apologize for her role in an illegal blockade of the Trans-Canada Highway.

Smith-McCrossin launched a bid for the leadership of the PC Party of Nova Scotia on February 6, 2018. Her leadership campaign was co-chaired by Halifax-businessman Rob Batherson and former Member of Parliament Scott Armstrong. She lost to Tim Houston.

Smith-McCrossin was re-elected as an independent in the 2021 provincial election. Smith-McCrossin’s victory in Cumberland North marked the first occasion since 1988 that an independent candidate won election to the Nova Scotia legislature. She was re-elected in 2024, marking the first time an independent was re-elected to the Nova Scotia legislature in history.

=== Controversies ===
In February 2020, during the 2020 Canadian pipeline and railway protests, McCrossin tweeted: “The rail blockades must be removed today. Businesses are being affected in Cumberland North and layoffs are coming soon for many if they are not removed immediately,” said the MLA at the time, calling those blockades “illegal”.

On June 22, 2021, Smith-McCrossin was accused of inciting a blockade of the Trans-Canada Highway in protest to the ongoing closures of the border. This led to her being ejected from the Progressive Conservative caucus and barred from running for the party in the upcoming election. Nova Scotia Progressive Conservative leader Tim Houston said "As colleagues for the past four years, I owed her an opportunity to explain her actions, and the efforts she took to conceal those actions from her caucus colleagues. Ms. Smith-McCrossin refused to acknowledge any wrongdoing and — when explicitly asked by her caucus — refused to apologize to Nova Scotians as she didn't take part in the border blockade."

In April 2023, Smith-McCrossin asserted that a woman who once worked in her constituency office was persuaded into signing a non-disclosure agreement with the Progressive Conservative caucus when she worked there in 2018. MLA and Minister Karla MacFarlane tabled a motion to expel Smith-McCrossin from the Nova Scotia House of Assembly, a legislative concept never before heard of in Westminster-style Parliaments of Commonwealth countries, the government later relenting. Smith-McCrossin is pursuing legal action. This matter is currently before the courts and is set to be heard in November 2024. Following the Resignation of Karla McFarlane the Notice of Motion became moot and the case was dropped.

== Electoral history ==
2024 Nova Scotia general election: Cumberland North
Party	Candidate	Votes	%	±%
Independent	Elizabeth Smith-McCrossin	3,567	55.29	+1.41
Progressive Conservative	Bill Dowe	2,194	34.00	+26.77
Liberal	Kurt Ditner	414	6.42	-25.23
New Democratic	Tyson Boyd	277	4.29	-2.95
Total		6,452	–	
Total rejected ballots		35		
Turnout		6,488	45.44	
Eligible voters		14,277		
Independent hold		Swing		
Source: Elections Nova Scotia

2021 Nova Scotia general election: Cumberland North
Party	Candidate	Votes	%	±%	Expenditures
Independent	Elizabeth Smith-McCrossin	4,235	53.87	+2.16^{1}	$61,145.93
Liberal	Bill Casey	2,488	31.65	-6.90	$51,915.80
Progressive Conservative	David Wightman	569	7.24	-44.47^{1}	$16,693.84
New Democratic	Lauren Skabar	569	7.24	+0.19	$23,023.94
Total valid votes/expense limit		7,861	99.43	-0.06	$79,940.53
Total rejected ballots		45	0.57	+0.06	
Turnout		7,906	58.59	+5.29	
Eligible voters		13,494			
Independent gain from Progressive Conservative		Swing		+4.53	
Source: Elections Nova Scotia

2017 Nova Scotia general election
Party	Candidate	Votes	%	±%
Progressive Conservative	Elizabeth Smith-McCrossin	3,639	51.71	
Liberal	Terry Farrell	2,713	38.55	
New Democratic	Earl Dow	496	7.05	
Independent	Richard Plett	106	1.51	
Atlantica	Bill Archer	84	1.19	
Total valid votes		7,038	100.0	
