= Fox Harbour Airport =

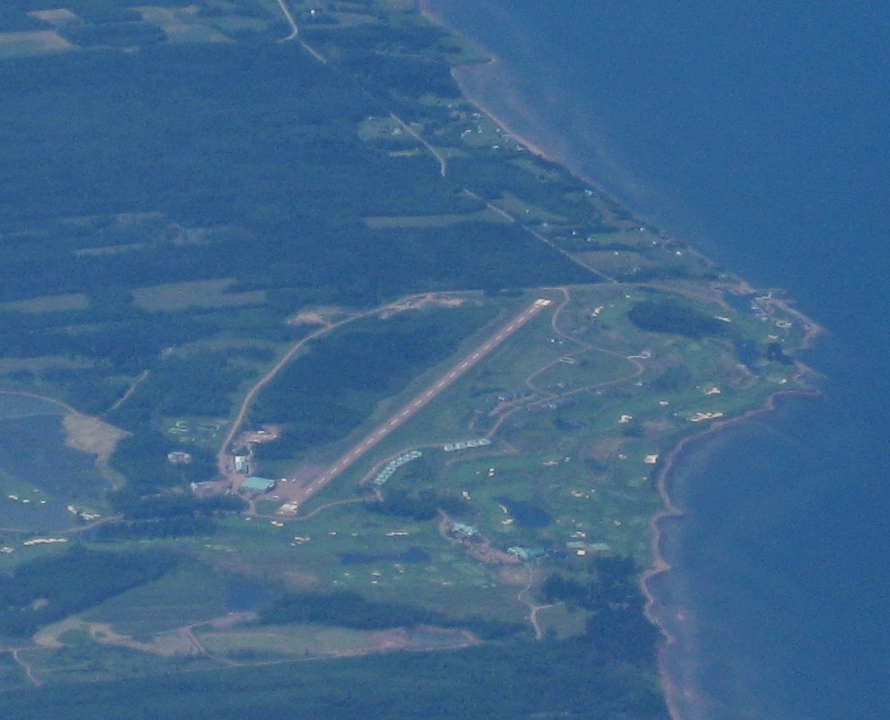
- Aerial view along Runway 33
- IATA: none; ICAO: none; TC LID: CFH4

Summary
- Airport type: Private
- Operator: Fox Harbour Development
- Location: Fox Harbour, Nova Scotia
- Time zone: AST (UTC−04:00)
  - Summer (DST): ADT (UTC−03:00)
- Elevation AMSL: 62 ft / 19 m
- Coordinates: 45°52′12″N 063°27′40″W

Map
- Location in Nova Scotia

Runways
Direction	Length		Surface
Direction	ft	m	Surface
15/33	4,885	1,489	Asphalt
- Source: Canada Flight Supplement

Fox Harbour Airport (TC LID: CFH4) is a privately owned airport located 1.5 nautical miles (2.8 km; 1.7 mi) north of Fox Harbour, Nova Scotia, Canada on the shore of Northumberland Strait.

It was built as part of the Fox Harb'r Resort, owned by Ron Joyce. After completion of the airport, the nearby Tatamagouche Airport, located adjacent to one of the Tim Hortons children's camps and also owned by Ron Joyce, was closed.

A crash on November 11, 2007 at the airport destroyed a Bombardier Global 5000 private jet and seriously injured five people including the airport's owner Ron Joyce. An investigation by the Canadian Transportation Safety Board in 2009 blamed a landing approach system that was unsuitable for high-performance jets, a road at the end of the runway that was a significant hazard and "seat of the pants" landing procedures at the airport.
