= Northport, Nova Scotia =

Community in Nova Scotia, Canada

Coordinates: 45°55′55.38″N 63°51′51.16″W

Northport in Nova Scotia

Northport is a community in the Canadian province of Nova Scotia, located on the Northumberland Strait in Cumberland County at the mouth of the Shinimicas River.

Northport was hit by a tornado August 16, 1980.

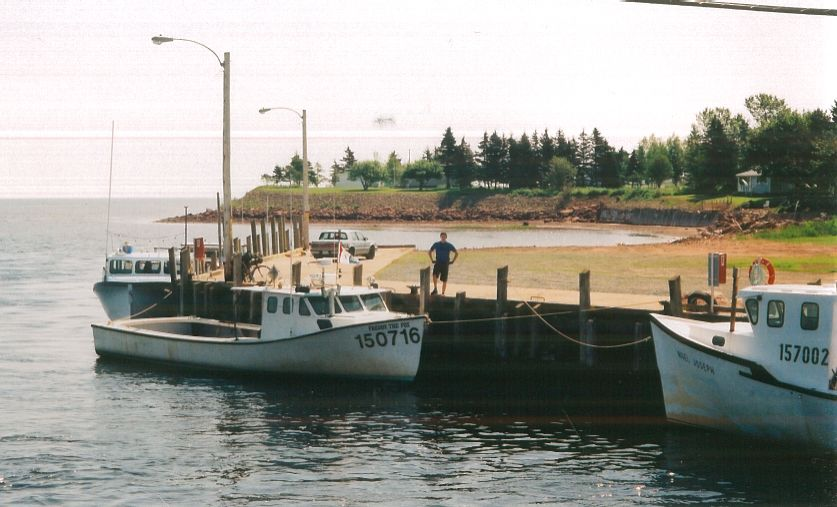
Northport

== Parks ==
- Amherst Shore Provincial Park
- Northport Beach Provincial Park
