= Mount Pleasant, Digby County, Nova Scotia =

Community in Nova Scotia, Canada

Coordinates: 44°38′34.4″N 65°47′24.91″W

Mount Pleasant in Nova Scotia

Mount Pleasant is a community in the Canadian province of Nova Scotia, located in the Municipality of the District of Clare in Digby County.
