= Ron Joyce =

Canadian businessman (1930–2019)

Ron Joyce CM
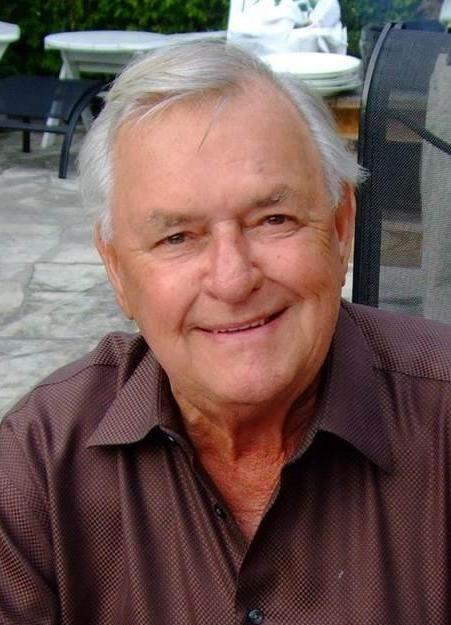
- Joyce in 2009
- Born: Ronald Vaughan Joyce; October 19, 1930; Tatamagouche, Nova Scotia, Canada
- Died: January 31, 2019 (aged 88); Burlington, Ontario, Canada
- Occupations: Entrepreneur and Philanthropist
- Known for: Tim Hortons
- Children: 7

Ronald Vaughan Joyce, CM (October 19, 1930 – January 31, 2019) was a Canadian entrepreneur, philanthropist, and billionaire. He was an early investor in the Tim Hortons doughnut chain as Tim Horton's first franchisee in 1967.

After the death of Tim Horton, Ron Joyce was instrumental in establishing the Tim Horton Children's Camps and the Tim Horton Children's Foundation. He received many awards and honours for his success in business and his extensive philanthropy. He was named as a member of the Order of Canada in 1992 in recognition of his dedication to underprivileged children and youth.

== Early life and career ==
Born on October 19, 1930 and raised in Tatamagouche, Nova Scotia, Joyce moved to Hamilton, Ontario, at age 16, to seek better living conditions than those of post-war Nova Scotia. He worked a number of odd jobs until eventually enlisting in the Royal Canadian Navy, in 1951, where he was trained as a wireless operator. In 1956, Joyce joined the Hamilton Police Service and served as a police officer until 1965. Once, while on patrol with Colin Millar (who would later become Chief Constable of the Hamilton Police Service), he responded to a distress call and delivered a baby.

Joyce decided to get involved in the newly emerging food-service industry and, in 1963, purchased a Dairy Queen franchise in Hamilton. He wanted to open up another Dairy Queen, but the city declined licensure for a second location. Joyce subsequently decided to open a coffee shop when he saw a "For Sale" sign posted on a store.

Joyce entered a franchise partnership with Tim Horton in 1967, and reportedly wrote "You must be kidding!" in reference to the clause of the one-page franchise agreement requiring rent in advance. After Horton's 1974 death in an auto accident, Joyce purchased Horton's share for about $1 million, and assumed control of the full Tim Hortons franchise.

Joyce hired a management team and began to franchise the company throughout the late 1970s until the 1990s. During the early 1990s, Danny Murphy, a franchise owner of both Tim Hortons coffee shops and Wendy's fast food restaurants in Prince Edward Island wanted to combine both franchises under one roof in a new development in Montague. Murphy asked Joyce and Wendy's founder, Dave Thomas, to be present for the opening.

In 1995, Wendy's and Tim Hortons merged and Joyce became the combined company's largest shareholder; the firms later separated.

== Retirement ==
Joyce eventually sold his Wendy's stock and retired from management, but even in retirement continued to be active in his holding company, Jetport Inc, which has significant real estate, aviation, and commercial interests.

In 2000, Joyce opened Fox Harb'r Golf Resort & Spa, a five star, four diamond resort/gated community. An airport was built as part of the new resort, replacing the nearby Tatamagouche Airport located at the Tim Hortons Tatamagouche Children's Camp.

In 2006, Joyce published his memoirs of his time with Tim Hortons titled Always Fresh: The Untold Story of Tim Hortons by the Man Who Created a Canadian Empire.

== Charitable contributions and awards ==
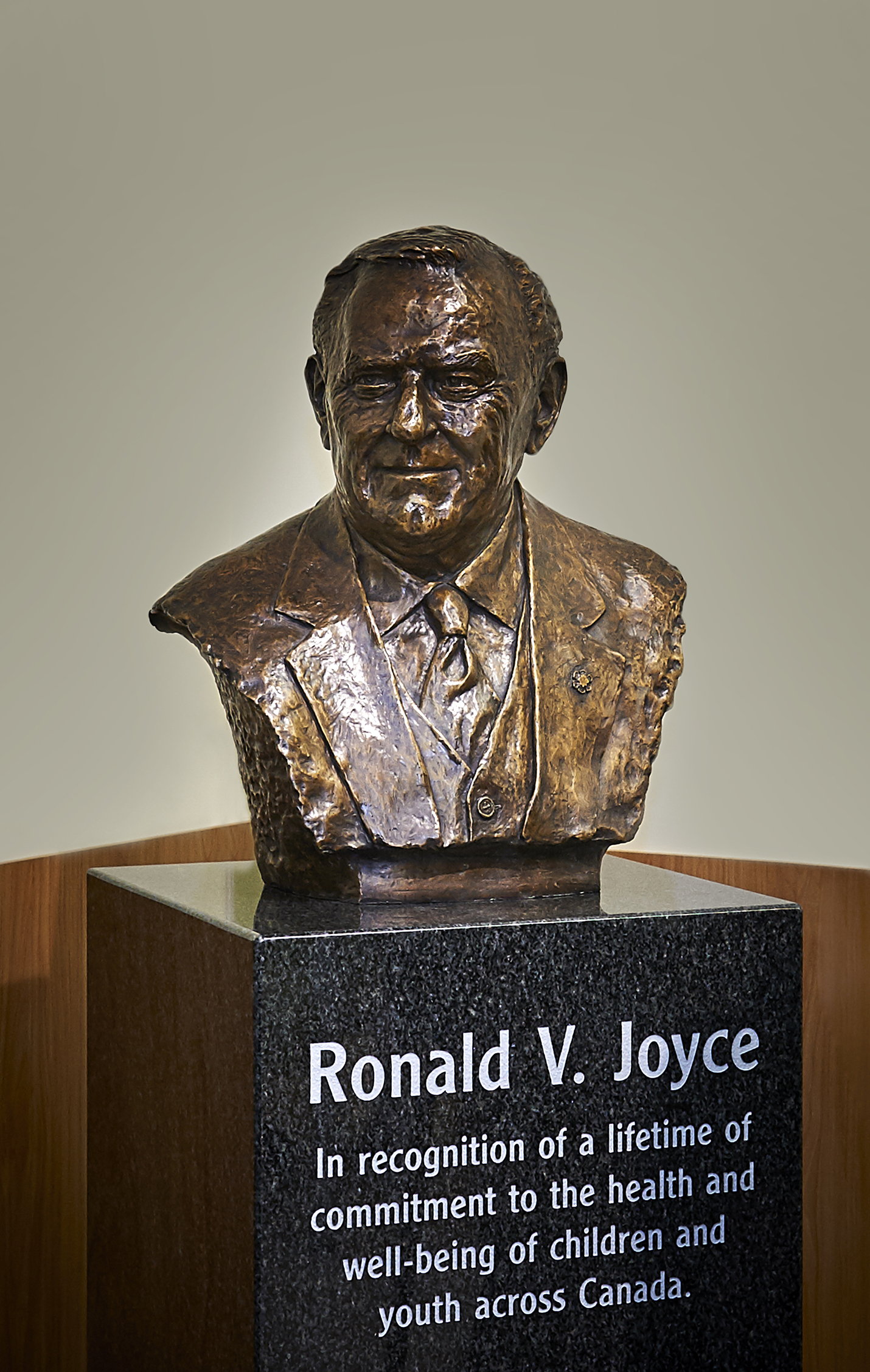
Bronze Sculpture at McMaster Children's Hospital

Motivated by his own adversity in childhood and youth, Joyce's philanthropic work was always focused on the well-being of Canada's youth, especially those who face financial disadvantage.

He founded the Tim Horton Children's Foundation, which sends underprivileged kids to camp each year. Joyce's efforts on behalf of the Foundation earned him the Gary Wright Humanitarian Award in 1991, in recognition of the outstanding contributions to the betterment of community life throughout Canada. Largely for his work with the Tim Horton Children's Camps, he received an appointment to the Order of Canada on October 21, 1992, in Ottawa. After selling his ownership of Tim Hortons, Joyce turned his sights to his own foundation, The Joyce Family Foundation, to administer his personal philanthropic work. The mandate of the Foundation is to support the social, economic, and emotional well-being of children. Ron Joyce was honoured at a celebration in May 2017 for his combined gifts to Atlantic Canada colleges and universities amounting to over $52 million. The Joyce Family Foundation has also made significant donations throughout Canada and Ron Joyce has been honoured with several philanthropist awards.

Joyce has accepted honorary degrees from seven Canadian universities, including Mount Allison University, McMaster University, Cape Breton University, University of Calgary, Queen's University, Saint Mary's University, and University of New Brunswick. In 1994, he received McGill University's Management Achievement Award. In November 1996, Ron Joyce became only the second person to ever receive the Canadian Franchise Association's Lifetime Achievement Award. In April 1999, Ron Joyce was inducted into the Canadian Business Hall of Fame and in October of the same year, he was named Entrepreneur of the Year for Ontario and Canada. In November 2005, Joyce was the 2005 Humanitarian Award Recipient by the Canadian Red Cross, Nova Scotia Region for his work with the Tim Horton Children's Foundation and for his continued support of education and health organizations across the world.

== Personal life ==
Joyce was married twice and both marriages ended in divorce. His son Ron Jr. married Tim Horton's eldest daughter Jeri-Lyn. The couple were franchisees of four Tim Hortons locations in southern Ontario until their retirement in 2023.

On November 11, 2007, the Bombardier Global 5000 business jet in which Joyce was travelling crashed short of the runway at his Fox Harb'r Resort's airport. Joyce suffered two fractured vertebrae as a result.

In May 2011, an unnamed woman in her mid-30s alleged that the billionaire co-founder of Tim Hortons sexually assaulted her at his home. The alleged incident occurred when the woman, who is representing herself in court, spent the night at Joyce's home in Burlington, Ont., so she could drive him to a medical appointment the following day. A $50,000 out-of-court settlement was reached between the two parties. In January 2017, the sexual assault lawsuit resurfaced as the two parties had different opinions on which the settlement was reached. Joyce's lawyers attempted to throw out the case but were ultimately forced to face trial.

As of 2017, he was worth an estimated US$1.4 billion. Joyce died at his home in Burlington on January 31, 2019, at the age of 88.
