= Will R. Bird =

Canadian writer (1891–1984)

- Born: May 11, 1891; East Mapleton, Nova Scotia, Canada
- Died: January 28, 1984 (aged 92); Sackville, New Brunswick, Canada
- Occupation: Writer
- Spouse: Ethel Sutton
- Children: Stephen Bird and Betty Bird
- Writing career
- Pen name: Will R. Bird
- Notable works: A Century at Chignecto, Thirteen Years After, & The Misadventures of Rufus Burdy
- Website: mta.ca/faculty/arts/history/wbird/bio.htm

William Richard Bird (May 11, 1891 – 1984) was a Canadian writer. He authored fifteen novels, two memoirs, six history books and three travel books.

== Early and personal life ==
He was born on May 11, 1891, in East Mapleton, to Augusta Bird, an educator, and Stephen Bird. A few years later his mother was left a widow with two stepsons and three sons as his father died of pneumonia. As a teenager, the family moved to the nearby town of Amherst, where his mother began running a boarding house. The family at this time was in need of money, so Will and his brother were unable to complete school. By the time he was twenty-three he decided to go to Alberta and work on the harvest to earn money. This was the case for many men from the East who were recruited to harvest crops on the prairies (see Harvest excursion).

Soon afterwards, war broke out in Europe and Will's youngest brother, Stephen, was enlisted, being killed in France a year afterward. Bird had volunteered for service overseas at the same time as his brother, but was rejected due to his poor teeth. Will Bird returned home to Nova Scotia, wanting to take up his brother's place in the military, and he enlisted immediately. By this point in the war, the Canadian Expeditionary Force's standards for dental health had been lowered; although Bird was required to have some teeth removed in Britain before being sent to the front in France. He served in France and Belgium at the front for two years with the Canadian Expeditionary Force (42nd Battalion (Royal Highlanders of Canada), CEF). His time in the war impacted his life as a writer as his war experiences were constantly a part of his stories. One of his finest works, And We Go On (1930) documents his time in France. Another book, Ghosts Have Warm Hands recounts his experiences during the war and his emotional connection to his brother, Stephen, who was killed in action before Bird was allowed to volunteer for service.

Once he was demobilized in 1919, he returned to the village of Southampton, Nova Scotia, where he married Ethel Sutton. Together they had two children, Stephen and Betty. Will had become a partner in a general store there, but the store failed in 1923 and the family moved back to Amherst. There he found employment in the post office.

Bird died on January 28, 1984, aged 92, in Sackville, New Brunswick.

== Career ==
While living in Southampton, he wrote his first story and won a newspaper essay contest; this was the beginning to his career as an author and in 1928 he decided to support his family by writing. His stories were accepted across North America by such magazines as the Saturday Evening Post, Toronto Star Weekly, Family Herald, Maritime Advocate and Weekly Star. His first book, A Century at Chignecto, was published in 1928 and was followed by a steady succession of fiction and non-fiction titles over the next 40 years.

In 1931, he was sent back to the battlefields of France by Maclean's Magazine to write a series called "Thirteen Years After". The series became a lecture tour and a book, published by MacLean's in 1931 and over the following five years was given to Canadian Legion branches throughout the Maritimes.

In 1933, he began work at the Nova Scotia Tourist Bureau, moving to Halifax in 1938, and he worked as chairman of the Historic Sites and Monuments Advisory Council, remaining there until his retirement in 1966.

When Canada went to war again in 1939, Bird lost his only son, Captain Stephen Stanley Bird, of the North Nova Scotia Highlanders. This caused him to enter a long period of writing, creating many stories that showed his grief.

Bird won the Ryerson Fiction Award twice, in 1945 for Here Stays Good Yorkshire and in 1947 for Judgment Glen.

Bird was president of the Canadian Authors Association from 1949 to 1950, and was succeeded by W. G. Hardy.

== Books ==
=== Non-fiction ===
==== Maritime history ====
- A Century at Chignecto (1928, story of Beaubassin)
- Historic Nova Scotia (1935)
- Done at Grand Pre (1955, story of the Expulsion of the Acadians)

==== War and military history ====
- And We Go On (1930, World War I)
- Private Timothy Fergus Clancy (1930)
- Thirteen Years After (1931, memoir)
- The Communication Trench (1932, trench warfare)
- The Two Jacks (1954, story of two Canadian heroes of the French Resistance)
- No retreating footsteps (1955, regimental history of the North Novas)
- The North Shore Regiment (1963)
- Ghosts Have Warm Hands (1968, reissue of And We Go On)

==== Travel ====
- This is Nova Scotia (1950)
- Off-Trail in Nova Scotia (1956)
- These Are the Maritimes (1959)

=== Fiction ===
==== War ====
- Private Timothy Fergus Clancy (1930, novel)

==== Historical fiction ====
- The Maid of the Marshes (1933, privately printed)
- Here Stays Good Yorkshire (1945, Ryerson Fiction Award, co-winner 1945)
- Judgment Glen (1947)
- The Passionate Pilgrim (1949)
- So Much to Record (1951)
- To Love and To Cherish (1954)
- The Shy Yorkshireman (1955)
- Tristram's Salvation (1957)
- Despite the Distance (1961)
- An Earl Must Have a Wife (1969, semi-fictional account of J.F.W. DesBarres)
- Angel Cove (1972, 19 stories about a 1920s Newfoundland fishing village)
- The Misadventures of Rufus Burdy (1975)
