= Wards Brook =

Community in Nova Scotia, Canada

- Location of Wards Brook, Nova Scotia
- Coordinates: 45°24′40″N 64°33′29″W
- Country: Canada
- Province: Nova Scotia
- Municipality: Cumberland County
- Time zone: UTC-4 (AST)
- Postal code: B
- Area code: 902
- Telephone Exchange: 254
- NTS Map: 021H07
- GNBC Code: CBNLX

Wards Brook is a community in the Canadian province of Nova Scotia, located in Cumberland County.
