= Parrsboro Regional High School =

Coordinates: 45.4055°N 64.3295°W

Location
- 109 King Street; Parrsboro, Nova Scotia, B0M 1S0; Canada

Information
- Type: High School
- School board: Chignecto-Central
- Principal: W. Jewers
- Grades: 7-12
- Enrollment: 150
- Colors: Blue and white
- Athletics: Soccer, Basketball, Badminton, Softball, Golf
- Website: ccrceprhs.ss21.sharpschool.com

Parrsboro Regional High School also known as PRHS is a school located in Parrsboro, Nova Scotia, Canada. PRHS consists of six grades- 7,8,9,10,11 and 12, with approximately 150 students and with 1 class per grade.

PRHS is located on King Street in Parrsboro, N.S. Students attend both schools from about a twenty-five kilometre radius. PRHS students come from surrounding communities such as Five Islands, Southampton and Port Greville.

The school's sports teams are called the Warriors. PRHS has a golf, softball, badminton, soccer and basketball team.

The current principal of Parrsboro Regional High School is Wanda Jewers.
