= New Canaan, Nova Scotia =

Community in Nova Scotia, Canada

Coordinates: 45°31′33.43″N 64°15′59.09″W

New Canaan in Nova Scotia

New Canaan is a community in the Canadian province of Nova Scotia, located in Cumberland County.
