= Lakelands, Cumberland County =

Community in Nova Scotia, Canada

Lakelands
- Location within Nova Scotia
- Coordinates: 45°28′N 64°20′W
- Country: Canada
- Province: Nova Scotia
- Municipality: Cumberland County
- Time zone: UTC-4 (AST)
- Postal code: B
- Area code: 902
- Telephone Exchange: 254

Lakelands is a rural community in the Canadian province of Nova Scotia, located in Cumberland County. It is located north of Parrsboro.
