= Truemanville =

Community in Nova Scotia, Canada

Coordinates: 45°51′42.49″N 64°4′1.62″W

Truemanville in Nova Scotia

Truemanville is a community in the Canadian province of Nova Scotia, located in Cumberland County.
