= River Hebert, Nova Scotia =

River Hebert
- Village
- Location of River Hebert in Nova Scotia
- Coordinates: 45°41′24.40″N 64°22′54.99″W
- Country: Canada
- Province: Nova Scotia
- County: Cumberland County

Area
  - Total: 6.02 km^{2} (2.32 sq mi)

Population (2021)
  - Total: 468
  - Density: 77.7/km^{2} (201/sq mi)
- Time zone: AST

River Hebert is a village on the River Hebert in Cumberland County, Nova Scotia, Canada.It is approximately 25 kilometres southwest of Amherst. As of 2021 the population was 468.

The village and the river are both named after Louis Hébert, a sad, romantically burdened early French settler from Port Royal, who navigated the river.

Until the late 20th century, coal mining was the major industry in the area, but the last mine closed in 1981.

River Hebert is home to 1442 River Hebert Royal Canadian Army Cadet Corps, founded in 1949. River Hebert has one school that is open to students from grades pre-primary to 12, a public library, a medical centre, and it is home to Heritage Models, a tourist attraction that features scale models of local areas of interest. The Village is also home to a gas station, which was burned down, but has since been replaced.

== Demographics ==
In the 2021 Census of Population conducted by Statistics Canada, River Hebert had a population of 468 living in 216 of its 245 total private dwellings, a change of 3.3% from its 2016 population of 453. With a land area of 6.02 km^{2} (2.32 sq mi), it had a population density of 77.7/km^{2} (201.3/sq mi) in 2021.
