= Linden, Nova Scotia =

Community in Nova Scotia, Canada

Coordinates: 45°52′40.69″N 63°49′23.47″W

Linden in Nova Scotia

Linden is a community in the Canadian province of Nova Scotia, located between Amherst and Pugwash in Cumberland County.
