= Hastings, Cumberland County, Nova Scotia =

Community in Nova Scotia, Canada

Coordinates: 45°49′56.7″N 64°7′24.93″W

Hastings in Nova Scotia

Hastings is a community in the Canadian province of Nova Scotia, located in Cumberland County.
