= Cumberland County, Nova Scotia =

Cumberland County Kwesomalegek (Mi'kmaq)
- County
- Municipality of the County of Cumberland
- Flag

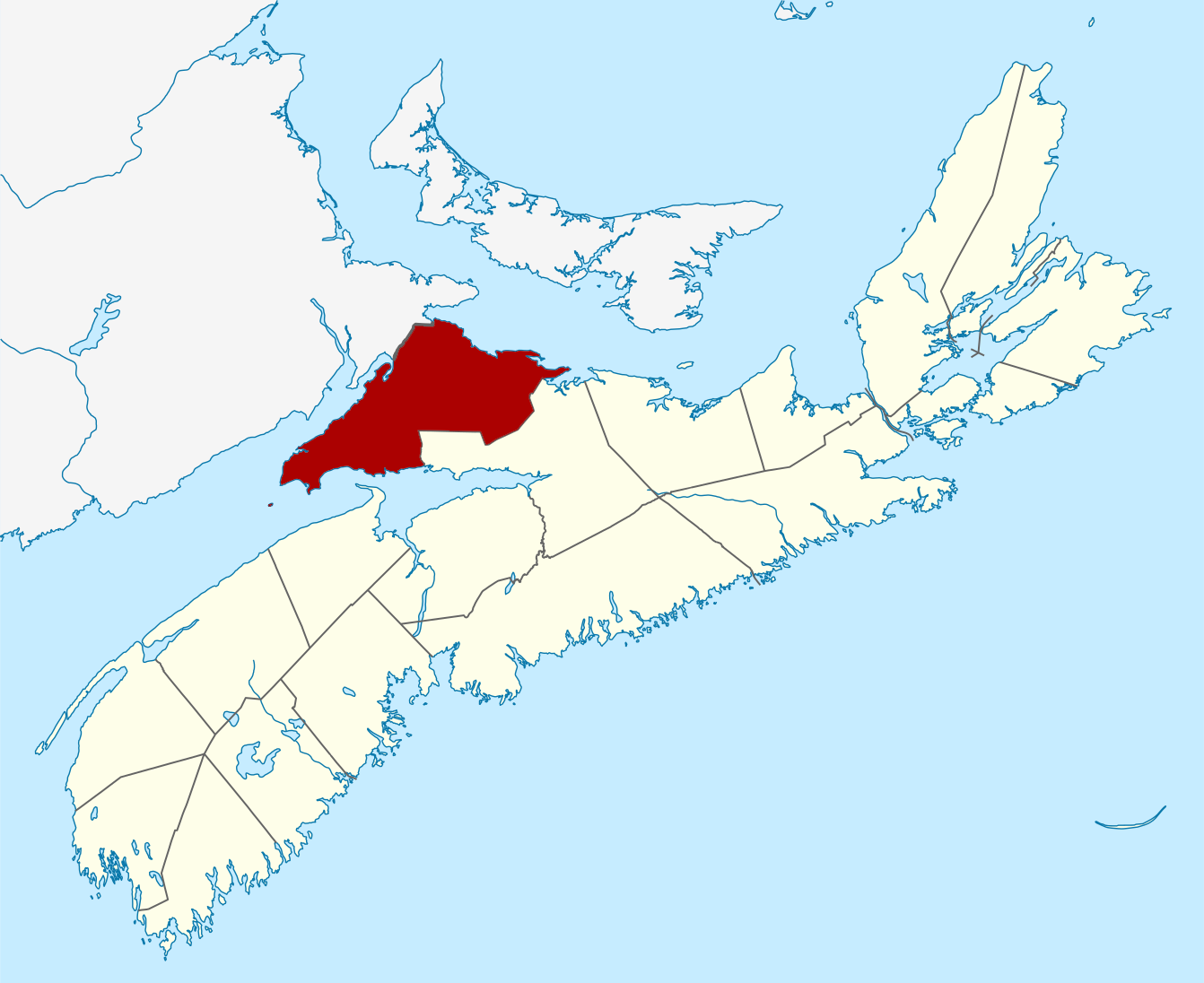
- Location of Cumberland County, Nova Scotia
- Coordinates: 45.7°N 64.1°W
- Country: Canada
- Province: Nova Scotia
- Towns: Amherst / Oxford
- Established: August 17, 1759
- Incorporated: April 17, 1879
- Named for: Prince William, Duke of Cumberland
- Electoral Districts Federal: Cumberland—Colchester
- Provincial: Cumberland North / Cumberland South

Government
  - Type: Cumberland County Municipal Council
  - Mayor: Rod Gilroy
  - MLA: Elizabeth Smith-McCrossin (Independent); Tory Rushton (PCNS)
  - MP: Alana Hirtle (LPC)

Area
  - Land: 4,275.77 km^{2} (1,650.88 sq mi)

Population (2021)
  - Total: 30,538
  - Density: 7.1/km^{2} (18/sq mi)
  - Change 2011-16: ▲1.8%
- Time zone: UTC-4 (AST)
  - Summer (DST): UTC-3 (ADT)
- Area code: 902
- Dwellings: 18,445
- Median Income*: $38,433 CAD
- Website: www.cumberland county.ns.ca
- Median household income, 2005 (all households)

Cumberland County is a county in the Canadian province of Nova Scotia.

Cumberland was named in 1755 in honour of the Duke of Cumberland to replace Beausejour. The historic county was founded in 1759 when the English system of administration was installed to complement settlement during the Charles Lawrence governorship, and was later divided at the partitioning of the province and in 1840. The area thrived in the 19th century with the development of lumbering, shipbuilding, and coal mining, but rural outmigration and deforestation led to some communities being abandoned in the 20th century. The county spans an area of 4,271.23 km^{2} making it Nova Scotia's second largest county, with resources including extensive forest land, several mineral resources, and agricultural areas that concentrate on wild blueberry harvesting. As of the 2021 census, Cumberland County had a population of 30,538, with the majority residing in the Municipality of the County of Cumberland. The county includes two towns, Amherst and Oxford, and two unincorporated population centres, Parrsboro and Springhill.

== History ==
The name Cumberland was applied by Lieutenant-Colonel Robert Monckton to the captured Fort Beauséjour on June 18, 1755, in honour of the third son of King George II, William Augustus, Duke of Cumberland, victor at Culloden in 1746 and Commander in Chief of the British forces. The Mi'kmaq name for the area was Kwesomalegek meaning "hardwood point".

Cumberland County was founded on August 17, 1759, the largest of Nova Scotia's five original administrative divisions. It included the Passamoquody, Wolastoq and Mi'kmaq nations north of the Bay of Fundy which formed the mainland part of the province and former Acadia, including all of what would become the province of New Brunswick. 1765 saw for the partitioning of Sunbury County, Nova Scotia out of the western-most part of Cumberland, roughly dividing the county in half along Passamoquody/Wolastoqiyuk and Mi'kmaq territorial lines.

At the partitioning of the province, Cumberland county was severed by the provincial boundary at Chignecto isthmus, where the county now forms the northern-most part of the Province.

When the Township of Parrsboro was divided in 1840, one part was annexed to Cumberland County and the other part annexed to Colchester.

The dividing line between Cumberland and Colchester was established in 1840. In 1897, a portion of the boundary line between the Counties of Colchester and Cumberland was fixed and defined. The county thrived in the 19th century with the development of lumbering, shipbuilding and coal mining. Deforestation and rural outmigration in the 20th century led to the abandonment of some communities such as Eatonville and New Yarmouth.

== Geography ==
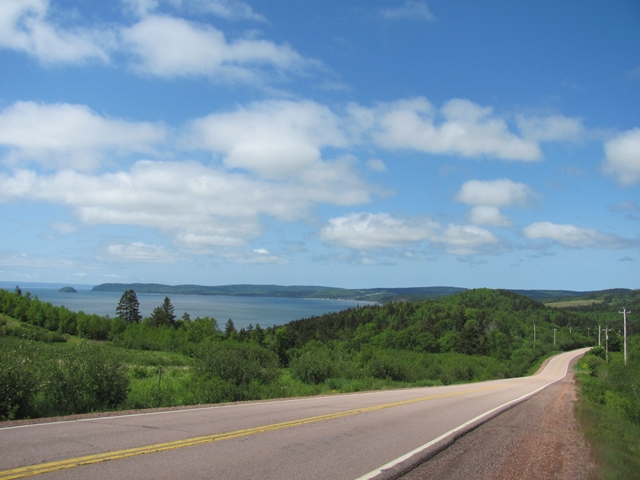
Cumberland county landscape at Fraserville with Spencers Island in background

The county has a total area of 4,271.23 km^{2} (1,649.13 sq mi).

Cumberland County is rich in natural resources with extensive forest land supporting lumber mills and pulp contractors. It has many mineral resources, including 2 operating salt mines. Until the 1970s it also had several coal mines which extracted coal from seams that run from Joggins to River Hebert and on to Athol and Springhill.

Agriculture is concentrated on wild blueberry harvesting throughout the Cobequid Hills, as well as mixed farms located in the Tantramar Marshes region, the Northumberland Strait coastal plain, and the Wentworth Valley.

The northwestern edge of Cumberland County forms part of the Isthmus of Chignecto, the natural land bridge connecting the Nova Scotia peninsula to North America. As such, the county hosts several important transportation corridors, including Highway 104 (the Trans-Canada Highway) and CN Rail's Halifax-Montreal railway line. The county line bordering New Brunswick is around 30 kilometres long (18.5 miles). Cumberland is the only county in Nova Scotia that borders another province.

Two towns are located in Cumberland County: Amherst and Oxford. The towns of Springhill and Parrsboro dissolved and joined the Municipality of Cumberland in 2015 and 2016 respectively.

=== Lakes ===
- Slade Lake

== Demographics ==
As a census division in the 2021 Census of Population conducted by Statistics Canada, Cumberland County had a population of 30,538 living in 14,139 of its 18,363 total private dwellings, a change of 1.8% from its 2016 population of 30,005. With a land area of 4,275.77 km^{2} (1,650.88 sq mi), it had a population density of 7.1/km^{2} (18.5/sq mi) in 2021.

Forming the majority of the Cumberland County census division, the Municipality of the County of Cumberland, including its Subdivisions A, B, C, and D, had a population of 19,964 living in 9,126 of its 12,988 total private dwellings, a change of 2.9% from its 2016 population of 19,402. With a land area of 4,253.04 km^{2} (1,642.11 sq mi), it had a population density of 4.7/km^{2} (12.2/sq mi) in 2021.

Population trend

Census	Population	Change (%)
2021	30,538	▲1.8%
2016	30,005	▼4.3%
2011	31,353	▼2.2%
2006	32,046	▼1.7%
2001	32,605	▼3.5%
1996	33,804	▼1.4%
1991	34,284	▼1.6%
1986	34,819	▼1.2%
1981	35,231	N/A
1941	39,476	
1931	36,366	
1921	41,191	
1911	40,543	
1901	36,168	
1891	34,529	
1881	27,368	
1871	23,518	N/A

Mother tongue language (2011)

Language	Population	Pct (%)
English only	29,645	97.32%
French only	370	1.21%
Non-official languages	345	1.13%
Multiple responses	100	0.33%

Ethnic Groups (2006)

Ethnic Origin	Population	Pct (%)
Canadian	14,580	46.8%
English	12,385	39.7%
Scottish	9,870	31.7%
Irish	6,775	21.7%
French	4,730	15.2%
German	2,470	7.9%
Dutch (Netherlands)	1,045	3.4%
North American Indian	945	3.0%

== Communities ==
Towns

- Amherst
- Oxford
- Parrsboro (unincorporated)
- Springhill (unincorporated)

Villages

- Pugwash
- River Hebert

County municipality and subdivisions

- Municipality of the County of Cumberland
  - Cumberland Subdivision A
  - Cumberland Subdivision B
  - Cumberland Subdivision C
  - Cumberland Subdivision D

== Highways ==
- Trunk 2
- Trunk 4
- Trunk 6
- Hwy 104 (TCH)
- Hwy 142
- Route 204
- Route 209
- Route 321

== See also ==
- List of municipalities in Nova Scotia
- Royal eponyms in Canada
- Black Lake listings within Nova Scotia.
