= Abegweit =

Abegweit may refer to:

- Abegweit, the name used by the Mi'kmaq Nation to refer to Prince Edward Island, Canada
- Abegweit First Nation, a Mi'kmaq First Nation community in Prince Edward Island
- MV Abegweit (1947), the name of an icebreaking ferry which operated across the Northumberland Strait between Prince Edward Island and New Brunswick
- MV Abegweit (1982), the name of an icebreaking ferry which operated across the Northumberland Strait between Prince Edward Island and New Brunswick
- Abegweit Passage, the narrowest part of the Northumberland Strait
