= 1886 in rail transport =

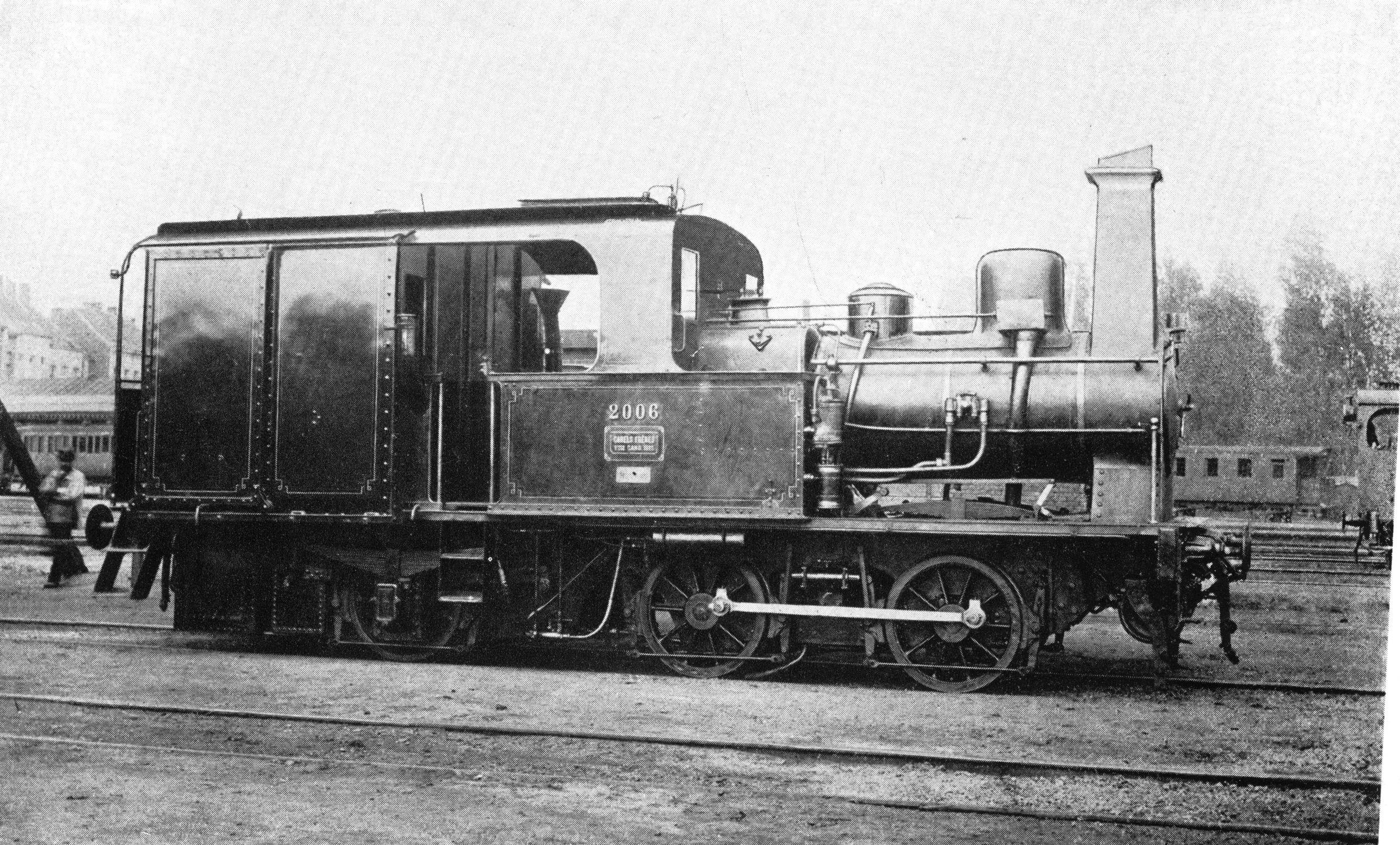

This article lists events related to rail transport that occurred in 1886.

== Events ==
=== January events ===
- January 25 – The North Hudson County Railway in New Jersey opens the first elevated cable railway in the United States, the Hoboken Elevated.

=== February events ===
- February 1 – The Mersey Railway opened to public traffic between Birkenhead and Liverpool by tunnel beneath the River Mersey, England.
- February 18 - The Kansas City, Memphis and Birmingham Railroad is incorporated in Mississippi.

=== March events ===
- March–September – Great Southwest Railroad Strike, a labor union strike against the Union Pacific and Missouri Pacific railroads involving more than 200,000 workers.
- March 30 – Executives from several railroad companies operating in the southern United States meet and agree to all regauge their railroads to standard gauge, 1,435 mm (4 ft 8 1/2 in), by June 1.

=== May events ===
- May – The Atchison, Topeka and Santa Fe Railway takes control of the Gulf, Colorado and Santa Fe Railway.

=== July events ===
- July 8 – Russian emperor Alexander III establishes Railway Worker Day as a national holiday on the anniversary of the name day of Nikolai I, who first commissioned Russian railroad construction.

=== August events ===
- August 17 – The 7 mile (11.3 km) long Lakeside and Marblehead Railroad is incorporated in Ottawa County, Ohio.

=== September events ===
- September 1 – Regular traffic (initially freight only) begins to pass through the Great Western Railway’s Severn Tunnel linking southern Gloucestershire and Monmouthshire.
- September 9 – The rail connection to Cape Tormentine, New Brunswick, is completed by a predecessor of the New Brunswick and Prince Edward Island Railway.

=== October events ===
- October 18 – Between 5:00 AM and 6:00 PM, the St. Louis, Arkansas and Texas Railroad, a predecessor of the St. Louis Southwestern Railway, converts 418 miles (673 km) of track from narrow gauge to standard gauge.

=== November events ===
- November 20 – The San Bernardino and Los Angeles Railway is incorporated as an Atchison, Topeka and Santa Fe Railroad subsidiary to build a rail connection between its namesake cities in California.

=== Unknown date events ===
- The first refrigerator cars on the Southern Pacific Railroad enter operation.
- The Southern Pacific Railroad wins the landmark Supreme Court case Santa Clara County v. Southern Pacific Railroad which establishes equal rights under the law to corporations.
- Grande Ceinture line around Paris completed.

== Births ==
=== May births ===
- May 4 – Henry G. Ivatt, Chief Mechanical Engineer of the London, Midland and Scottish Railway (d. 1976).

=== Unknown date births ===
- W. Graham Claytor, president of Southern Railway (US) (d. 1971).

== Deaths ==
=== July deaths ===
- July 24 – Nathaniel Worsdell, English carriage builder (b. 1809).

=== December deaths ===
- December 28 - William Kimmel, director for Baltimore and Ohio Railroad (b. 1812).

=== Unknown date deaths ===
- David Levy Yulee, Florida railroad executive (b. 1810).
