= MV Abegweit =

MV Abegweit may refer to one of the following ferries:

- MV Abegweit (1947)
- MV Abegweit (1982)
