= Confederation Bridge =

Canadian bridge from Prince Edward Island to the mainland

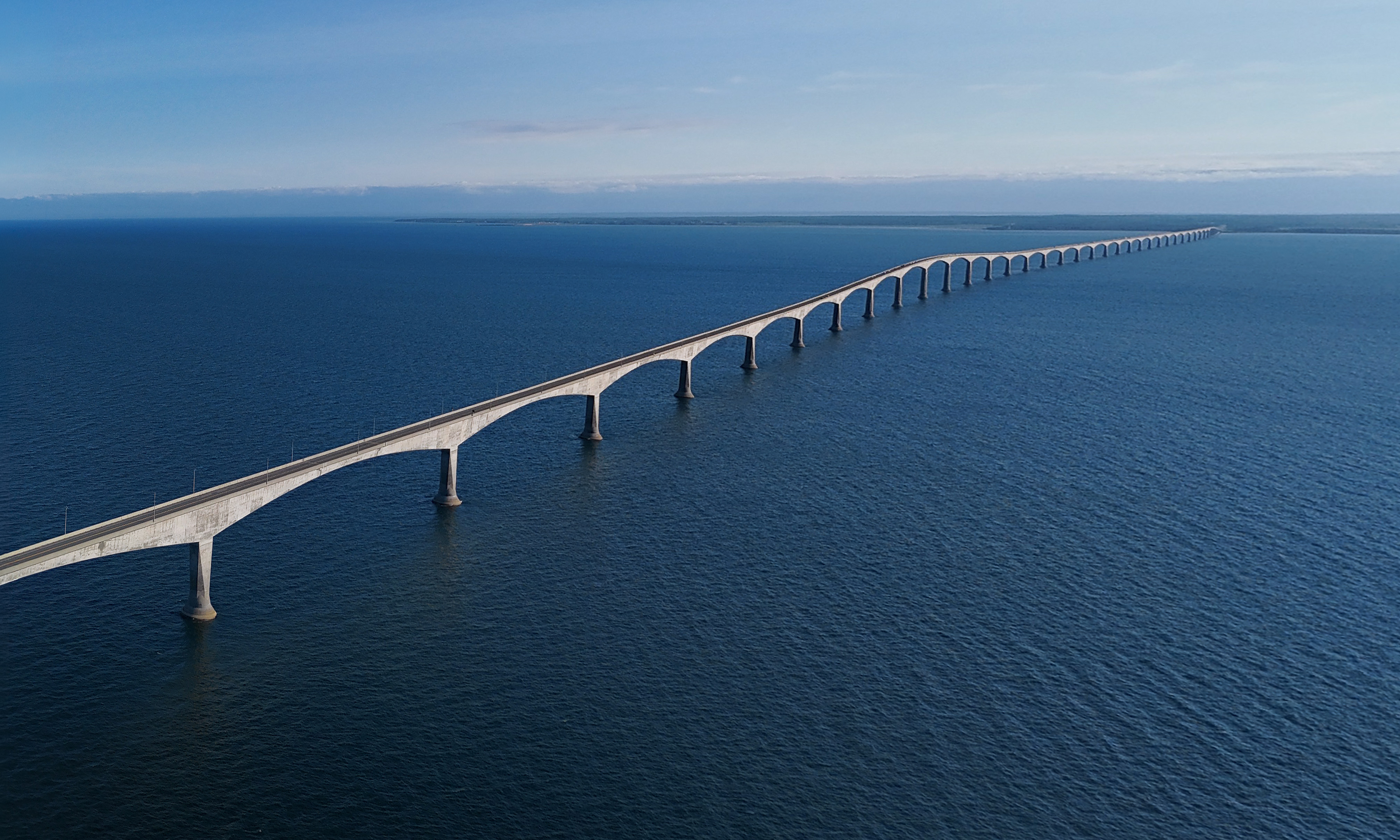
- Confederation Bridge in 2025, Prince Edward Island side
- Coordinates: 46°12′55″N 63°44′45″W
- Carries: 2 lanes of Route 16 / Route 1 (Trans-Canada Highway)
- Crosses: Northumberland Strait
- Locale: Borden-Carleton, Prince Edward Island; Cape Jourimain, New Brunswick
- Official name: Confederation Bridge / Pont de la Confédération
- Other name(s): The Bridge; The Link; The Fixed Link; Epekwitk Crossing; Abegweit Crossing; The Span of Green Gables
- Maintained by: Strait Crossing Bridge Limited (SCBL) (Vinci Concessions — 85%)

Characteristics
- Design: Multi–span post-tensioned concrete box girder
- Total length: 12.9 km (8.0 mi)
- Longest span: 250 m (820 ft) (43 segments)
- Clearance below: 60 m (200 ft) main shipping channel only 40 m (131.23 ft) at the near-shore shipping channels

History
- Construction start: 1 November 1993; 33 years ago
- Construction end: May 1997; 29 years ago
- Opened: 31 May 1997; 29 years ago

Statistics
- Daily traffic: about 4,000
- Toll: C$20.00 two-axle automobile $20.00 motorcycle $9.50 bicycle (transported by shuttle vehicle) $4.75 pedestrian (transported by shuttle vehicle - paid westbound-only)

Location
- Location on Prince Edward Island

The Confederation Bridge (French: Pont de la Confédération) is a box girder bridge carrying the Trans-Canada Highway across the Abegweit Passage of the Northumberland Strait, linking the province of Prince Edward Island with the mainland province of New Brunswick. Opened on May 31, 1997, the 12.9-kilometre (42,000 ft; 8.0 mi) bridge is Canada's longest bridge and the world's longest bridge over ice-covered water.

The bridge was designed by French engineer Jean M. Muller who was a specialist of multiple span match-casting bridges. Construction took place from 1 November 1993 until May 1997 and cost C$1.3 billion. Before its official naming, Prince Edward Islanders often referred to the bridge as the "Fixed Link". It officially opened to traffic on May 31, 1997.

== Structure ==
The bridge is a two-lane toll bridge that carries the Trans-Canada Highway between Borden-Carleton, Prince Edward Island (at Route 1) and Cape Jourimain, New Brunswick (at Route 16).

It is a multi-span balanced cantilever bridge with a post-tensioned concrete box girder structure. Most of the curved bridge is 40 metres (131 ft) above water; there is a 60-metre (197-foot) navigation span for ship traffic. The bridge rests on 62 piers, of which the 44 main piers are 250 metres (820 ft) apart. The bridge is 11 metres (36 ft) wide.

The speed limit on the bridge is 80 kilometres per hour (50 mph) but can vary with wind and weather conditions. When travelling at the speed limit, it takes about 12 minutes to cross the bridge.

== Tolls ==
Tolls apply only when leaving Prince Edward Island (i.e., when travelling west). The toll rates since August 2025 have been $20 per vehicle, with no charge for additional axles. Motorcycles are also charged $20.

While pedestrians and cyclists are not permitted to cross the bridge, a shuttle service is available. Before 2006, the shuttle was free and since January 1, 2022, the service has charged $4.75 per pedestrian or $9.50 per cyclist when leaving Prince Edward Island. Baggage is charged at a rate of $4.25 per bag after the first bag.

When the bridge opened, it charged $35 per two-axle automobile, with the rate increasing by 75% of yearly inflation. By January 1 2022, these tolls had reached $50.25. Following the effects of the COVID-19 pandemic, the Government of Canada subsidized toll revenues and froze any potential increases each year, keeping the 2022 rate of $50.25 plus $8.50 per additional axle.

As part of a promise made during Mark Carney's campaign in the 2025 federal election, effective August 1, 2025, the toll was further subsidized by the Federal Government and reduced from $50.25 to $20. Also effective August 1, 2025, the other major Northumberland Strait crossing, the Wood Islands Ferry from Wood Islands, Prince Edward Island to Caribou, Nova Scotia, halved its charges from the previous rate of $86 to $43 per car, including passengers, when leaving Prince Edward Island. Other fares halved include the rates for commercial vehicles, pedestrians, motorcycles, and bicycles, and to fuel surcharges.

Travellers, whether entering the island by bridge and leaving by ferry or, vice versa, pay for leaving the Island only.

== History ==
Various proposals for a fixed link across the Northumberland Strait can be traced as far back as the 1870s when the provinces' railway systems were developed. Subsequent proposals arose during federal elections in the late 1950s and early 1960s. The ebb and flow of public support for a fixed link was indirectly tied to the varying levels of federal investment in ferry and steamship connections to the province over the years, finally culminating in a proposal in the mid-1980s which resulted in the construction of the current bridge.

=== Water transportation links ===
As a part of Prince Edward Island's admission into the Dominion of Canada in 1873, the Canadian government was obligated to provide:

. . . efficient steam service for the conveyance of mails and passengers to be established and maintained between the Island and the mainland of the Dominion, winter and summer, thus placing the Island in continuous communication with the Intercolonial Railway and the railway system of the Dominion . . .

Following Confederation, early steamship services across Northumberland Strait connected the Island ports of Charlottetown and Georgetown with railway facilities at Pictou, Nova Scotia. Similar services operated from Summerside connected with railway facilities at Shediac, New Brunswick.

The most direct route across the Northumberland Strait, however, was at the 13-kilometre (8.1 mi) wide Abegweit Passage. Infrequent winter service provided by underpowered steamships incapable of breaking sea ice ensured the survival of a passenger and mail service across Abegweit Passage using iceboats until a permanent ferry service was established in the 1910s.

The unsatisfactory winter steamship service and reliance upon primitive iceboats provoked complaints from the Island government until the federal government decided to implement a railcar ferry service across Abegweit Passage between new ports at Port Borden and Cape Tormentine.

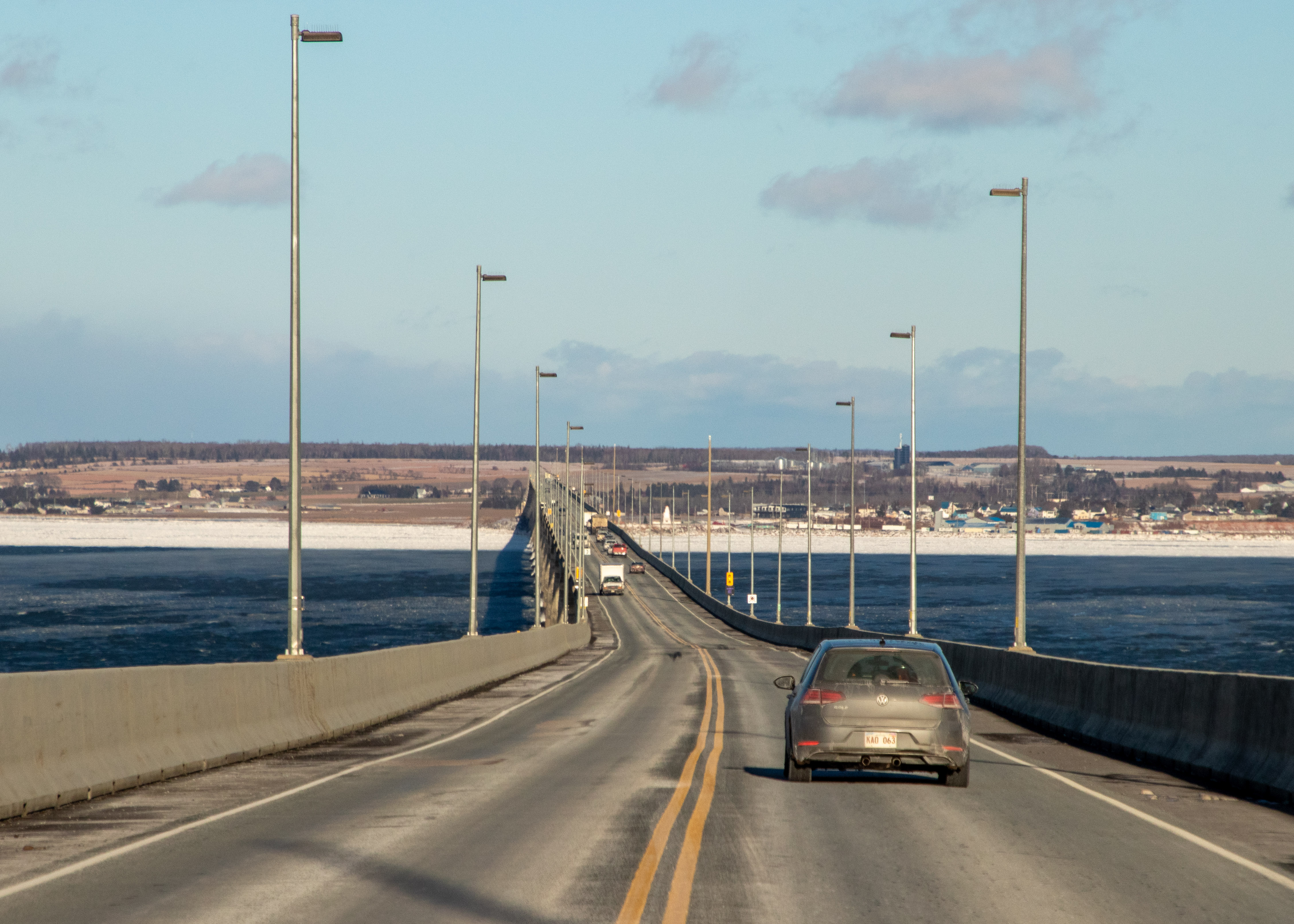
Northbound on the Confederation Bridge toward Prince Edward Island

In 1912, the federal government promised to open a car ferry between the "Capes" (Cape Traverse, PEI to Cape Tormentine, NB). The privately owned New Brunswick and Prince Edward Island Railway from Sackville, New Brunswick to Cape Tormentine was purchased by the federal government and an order was made with a shipyard in England for an icebreaking railcar ferry, to be called the Prince Edward Island. Ports were developed at Carleton Point, several kilometres west of Cape Traverse, and the existing harbour at Cape Tormentine; the new port at Carleton Point would be named Borden in honour of Prime Minister Sir Robert Borden.

The new ferry entered service in 1915 and operated on the former steamship routes until port facilities were opened in October 1917. Automobile service was added in 1938 and other vessels followed as the ferry service expanded in the post-war years.

This ferry service was initially the responsibility of Canadian Government Railways (1917–1918) and later Canadian National Railway (1918–1983), then a CNR subsidiary CN Marine (1977–1986). In 1986, CN Marine was renamed when all federal government ferry services in Atlantic Canada were transferred to the new Crown corporation Marine Atlantic.

Ferry service years

- Prince Edward Island (1917-1968)
- Scotia I (various years 1917–1957)
- Scotia II (various years 1937–1968)
- Charlottetown (1931–1941)
- Abegweit (1947–1982), renamed Abby (1983)
- Confederation (1962–1976)
- John Hamilton Gray (1968–1997)
- Lucy Maud Montgomery (1969–1973)
- Holiday Island (1971–1997)
- Vacationland (1971–1997)
- Abegweit (1982–1997)

=== Early proposals ===
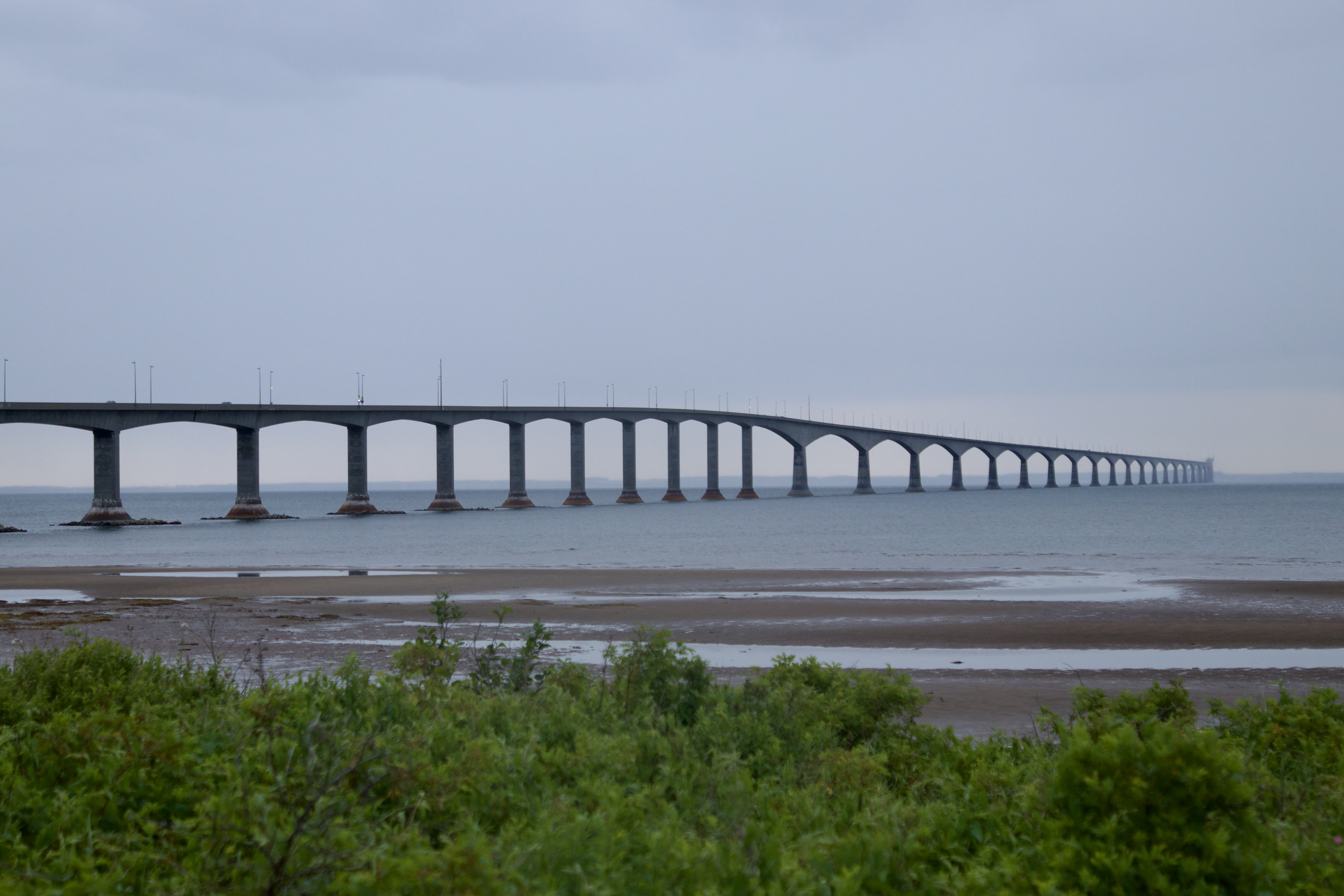
The bridge viewed from Cape Jourimain

Discussion of a fixed link can be traced to George Howlan, who called for construction of a railway tunnel beneath Abegweit Passage at the same time as the Prince Edward Island Railway was being built across the province in the 1870s. Howlan also raised the issue as a member of the provincial Legislative Assembly, and in 1891, as a Senator and member of a delegation to meetings on the subject, conducted at the British Parliament. The idea lost favour following his death in 1901.

Talk of a fixed link was revived in the 1950s and 1960s, coinciding with federal election campaigns. The topic was raised in 1957, only two years following the opening of the Canso Causeway, and at the same time as another mega-project, the St. Lawrence Seaway was being constructed. A rockfill causeway was proposed to cross Abegweit Passage, with a 300-metre (984 ft) bridge/tunnel to accommodate shipping. This plan was rejected for navigational reasons but was raised again in 1962, and in 1965, the federal government, ignoring concerns of the shipping industry, called for tenders for a $148 million fixed link featuring a tunnel/causeway/bridge. Approach roads and railway lines were constructed at Borden and Jourimain Island but the project was formally abandoned in 1969 upon scientific recommendation in favour of improved ferry services.

Due to the extremely complex tidal regime in the Northumberland Strait consisting of diurnal and semi-diurnal cycles, any attempt to close Abegweit Passage would be next to impossible since the tidal cycles on each side of a causeway would be placed at opposites to each other. It is estimated by tidal experts at the Canadian Hydrographic Service, that tidal currents through a gap in such a causeway would be in excess of 18 knots (33 km/h), powerful enough to counter most commercial ships and to sweep away boulders the size of houses.

=== 1988 plebiscite ===
Consideration of a fixed link was renewed in the 1980s by an unsolicited proposal from a Nova Scotia businessman. The federal government favoured the construction of a fixed link chiefly because of the rising costs of providing ferry service (a constitutional requirement dating from PEI's accession to Confederation) and the increasing deficits being incurred by the railway system on PEI (run as part of Canadian National, then a Crown corporation). The federal government proposed to provide a fixed subsidy for the construction and operation of a fixed link, in return for the province agreeing to the abandonment of the ferry service and the railway system.

Following the election of the Progressive Conservative government of Brian Mulroney, with its agenda for regional development through so-called "mega-projects", Public Works Canada called for formal proposals in 1987 and received three offers. These proposals included a tunnel, a bridge, and a combined tunnel-causeway-bridge.

These developments sparked an extremely divisive debate on the Island, and Premier Joe Ghiz promised a plebiscite to gauge public support, which was held on January 18, 1988.

During the plebiscite debate, the anti-link group Friends of the Island cited potential ecological damage from the construction, as well as concerns about the impact on Prince Edward Island's lifestyle in general, and noted that the "mega-project" model has had limited success in other areas of the world, and rarely enriched the local population. The Friends of the Island believed that a fixed link was being pressured by a federal government not willing to shoulder the cost of constitutional obligations for funding an efficient ferry service, and that a link would be built largely for the benefit of mainland tourists and businesses waiting to exploit the Island.

The pro-link group Islanders for a Better Tomorrow noted transportation reliability would result in improvements for exporters and the tourism industry.

The result was 59.4% (in total percentage) in favour of the fixed link.

Choice	Votes	%
For	33,229	59.66
Against	22,472	40.34
Total	55,701	100.00
Valid votes	55,701	99.67
Invalid/blank votes	183	0.33
Total votes	55,884	100.00
Registered voters/turnout	86,042	64.95
Source: Elections PEI

== Bridge development ==
The debate did not end with the 1988 plebiscite and the federal government faced numerous legal challenges and a lengthy environmental impact assessment for the project. The developer of the single bridge proposal, Strait Crossing Development Inc., was selected and an announcement that the Northumberland Strait Crossing Project would be built was finally made on December 2, 1992; the developer being required to privately finance all construction through bond markets.

Shareholders of Strait Crossing Development Inc. included:

- OMERS, an Ontario public servant pension fund (under the OMERS subsidiary BPC Maritime Corporation)
- Vinci Concessions Canada Inc., Montreal, Quebec (part of the French company Vinci SA)
- Strait Crossing Inc., Calgary, Alberta (at one time part of the W. A. Stephenson / Stephenson Construction International (SCI) Engineers & Constructors Group of Companies)

In April 2022, Vinci Concessions announced it was acquiring the majority stake then held by OMERS, increasing its stake to 85%.

=== Constitutional amendment ===
As mentioned, the Schedule to the Prince Edward Island Terms of Union in the Constitution of Canada required steamship service to connect the Island's railway system with that of mainland North America. A dedicated ferry service replaced the steamships in 1917, but no changes were made to the constitution. The fixed crossing, however, required a constitutional amendment (see Amendments to the Constitution of Canada).

The Constitution Amendment Proclamation, 1993 (Prince Edward Island) dealt with this issue, as well as the issue of tolls on the crossing. It made clear that the government (or a private body) could charge a toll (an essential part of the government's financing plans) for the crossing without violating the terms of union:

"That a fixed crossing joining the Island to the mainland may be substituted for the steam service referred to in this Schedule... That, for greater certainty, nothing in this Schedule prevents the imposition of tolls for the use of such a fixed crossing between the Island and the mainland, or the private operation of such a crossing."

=== Construction ===
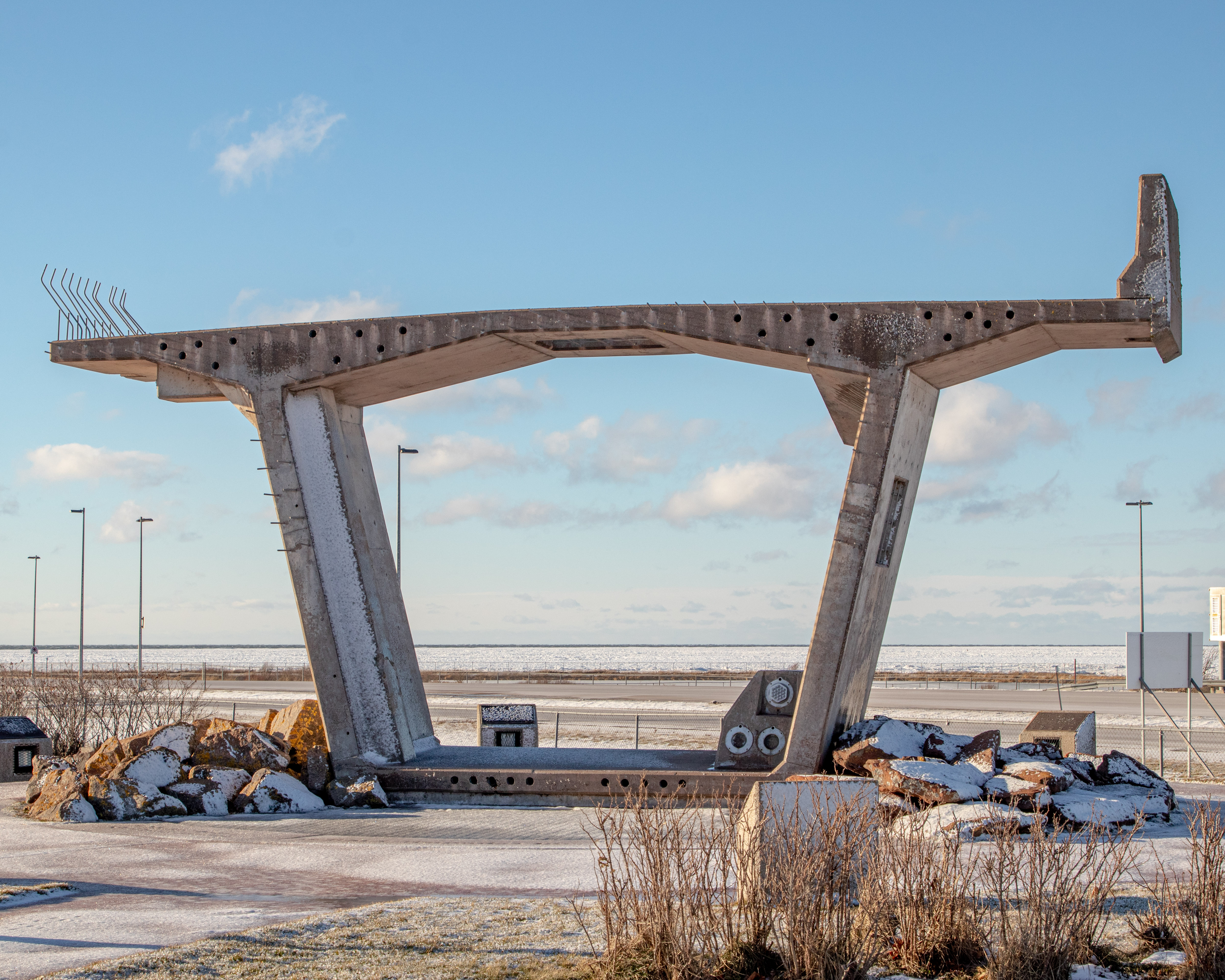
Bridge segment on display in 2026

The construction, which was carried out by a construction joint venture of Ballast Nedam, GTMI (Canada), Northern Construction and Strait Crossing Inc., started in the fall of 1993, beginning with preparation of staging facilities. Bridge components were built year-round from 1994 to the summer of 1996, and placement of components began in the fall of 1994 until the fall of 1996. Approach roads, toll plazas, and final work on the structure continued until the spring of 1997, at an estimated total cost of $1 billion.

All bridge components were constructed on land, in purpose-built staging yards located on the shoreline at Amherst Head, fronting on Borden Harbour just east of the town and ferry docks, and an inland facility located at Bayfield, New Brunswick, about three kilometres (1.9 mi) west of Cape Tormentine. The Amherst Head staging facility was where all large components were built, including the pier bases, ice shields, main spans, and drop-in spans. The Bayfield facility was used to construct components for the near-shore bridges which were linked using a launching truss extending over shallow waters almost two kilometres (1.2 mi) from the New Brunswick shore, and .5 kilometres (0.3 mi) from the Prince Edward Island shore.

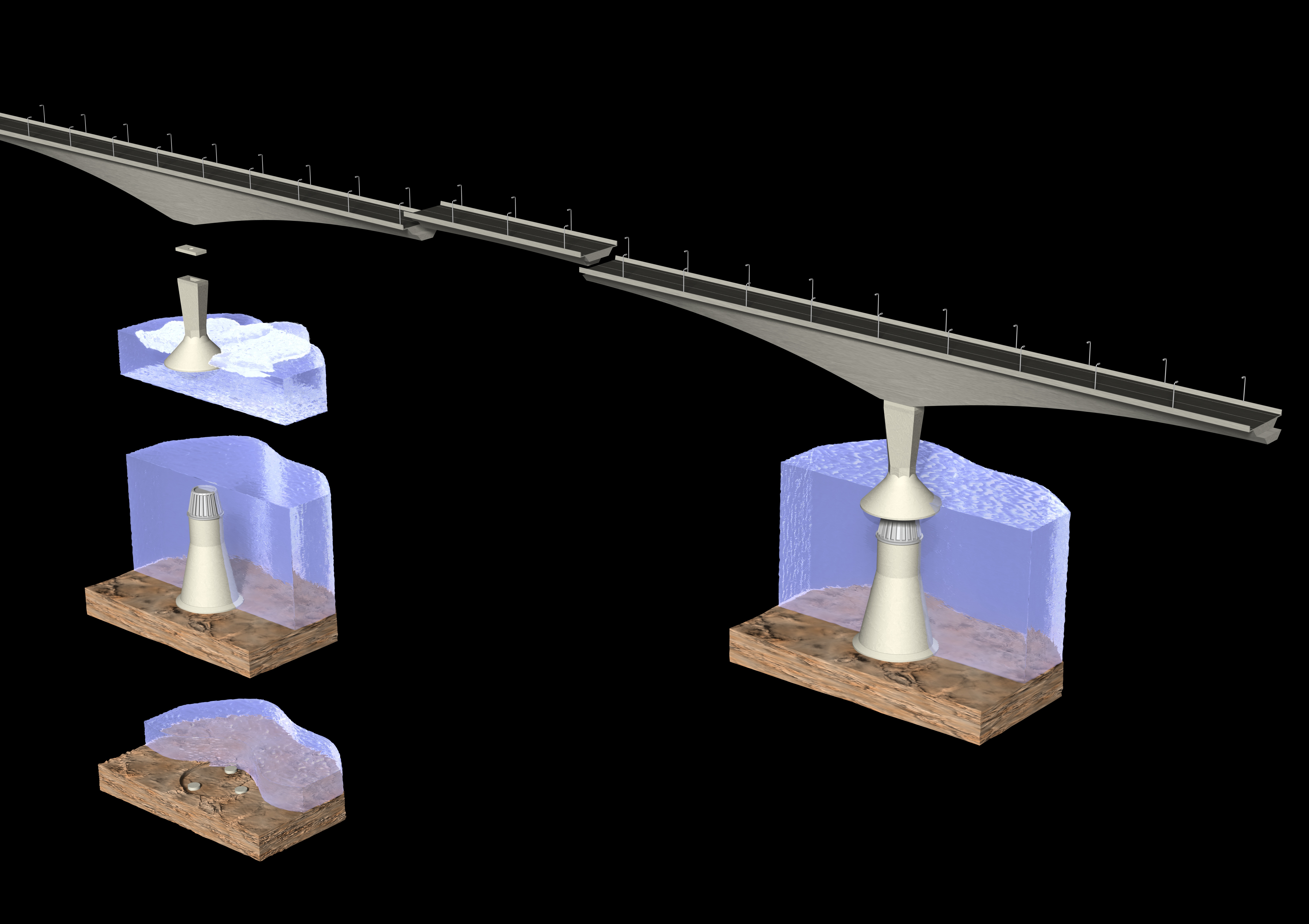
Diagram of the major parts of the bridge.

Extremely durable high-grade concrete and reinforcing steel were used throughout construction of the pre-cast components, with the estimated lifespan of the bridge being in excess of 100 years. The reinforced concrete structure was also designed to withstand iceberg impacts, as a deflection cone encircles each pillar at the point when it meets the water surface that would cause an iceberg to bounce off. Their sheer size and weight required strengthening of the soil base during the design and preparation work for the Amherst Head staging facility, as well as the use of a crawler transport system to move pieces from fabrication to storage, and onto a nearby pier. These crawler transports, using specially designed teflon-coated concrete rails, earned the nickname lobsters from workers.

All major components were lifted from the Amherst Head staging facility, transported, and placed in Abegweit Passage using the HLV Svanen, a Dutch-built heavy lift catamaran, which during the construction of the fixed link was reportedly the tallest man-made structure in the province. HLV Svanen was custom-built for use on the Great Belt Bridge in the early 1990s, Denmark's largest construction project, and was modified at a French shipyard before working on the Northumberland Strait Crossing Project. Following the placement of the final major component and completion of the bridge structure in Abegweit Passage on November 19, 1996, HLV Svanen returned to Denmark for use in construction of the Øresund Bridge.

Construction of the fixed link required over 5,000 workers ranging from labourers and specialty trades, to engineers, surveyors, and managers. The economic impact of construction on Prince Edward Island was substantial, with the provincial GDP rising over 5% during the construction, providing a short-term economic boom for the Island.

It neared completion in April 1997.

=== Naming ===
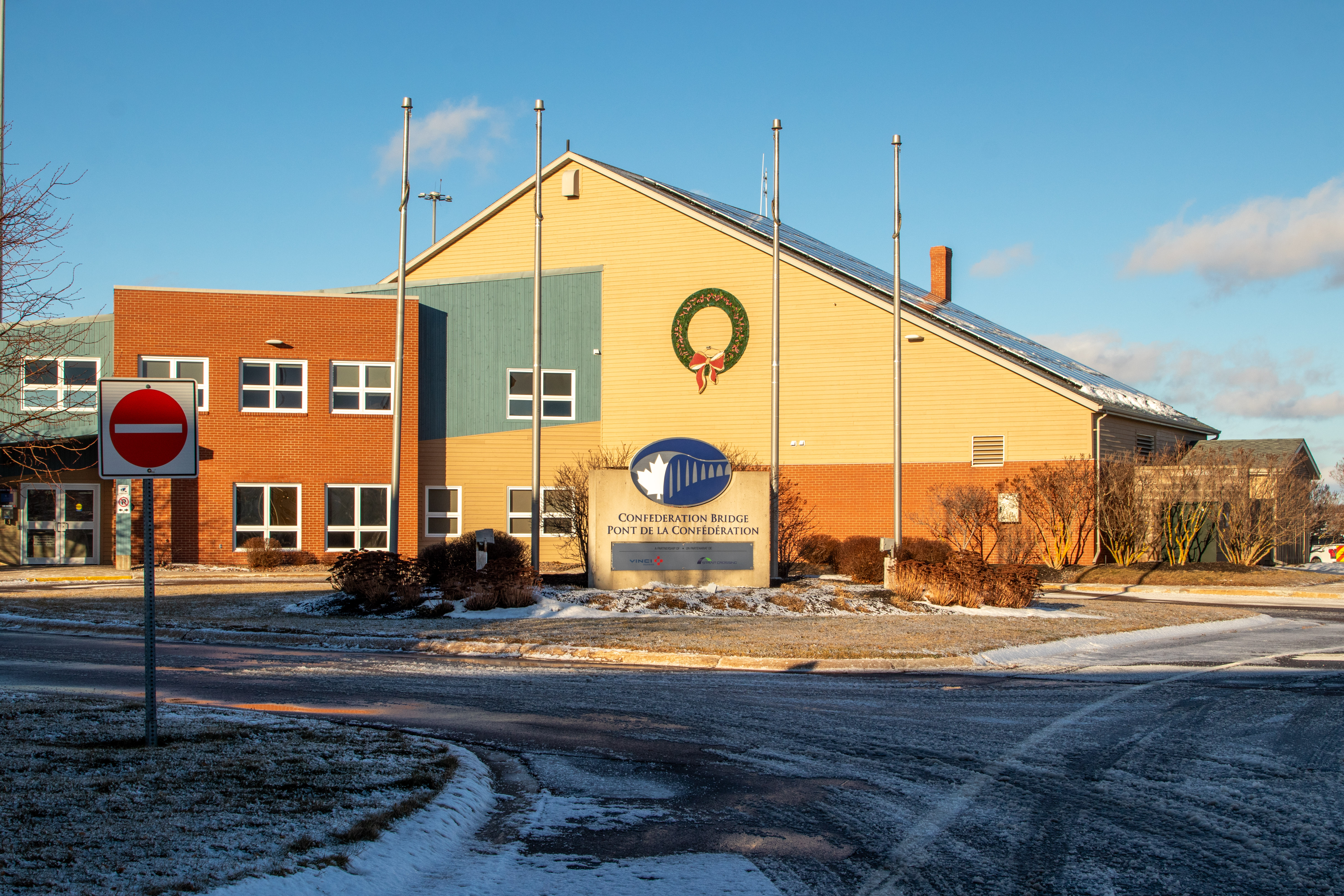
The Confederation Bridge administrative offices in 2026

Throughout construction, the federal government received suggestions for names. A committee was formed on May 1, 1996, chaired by former PEI premier Alex Campbell, to choose the new name from the submissions. The committee chose the name "Abegweit Crossing", which would pay homage to the Abegweit Passage which the bridge crosses, the vessel M/V Abegweit which the bridge would replace, and to the Mi'kmaq traditional name for the island.

However, the Canadian government overruled the committee, and on September 27, 1996, the Minister of Public Works and Government Services Diane Marleau announced that the bridge's name would be "Confederation Bridge". This name is not without controversy as many Islanders feel the word "Confederation" is overused throughout the province, finding use in the name of a Northumberland Ferries Limited vessel (M/V Confederation), a performing arts centre and art gallery (Confederation Centre of the Arts), a shopping centre (Confederation Court Mall), and the province-wide rails to trails system (Confederation Trail), as well as in tourism promotions (e.g., "Birthplace of Confederation").

The President of Ireland, Mary McAleese, during a state visit to Canada in 1998, referred to the bridge as the "Span of Green Gables".

In April 2022, the PEI legislature voted unanimously in favour of renaming the bridge to "Epekwitk Crossing", whereas Epekwitk (/ˈɛbəɡwɪd/ EH-bə-gwid) is the traditional Mi'kmaq name for Prince Edward Island. The name change would need to be approved by the Canadian federal government in order to take effect.

=== Finishing ===
The structure of the bridge was completed at midnight on November 19–20, 1996, with the installation of the last concrete girder. About an hour later, civil engineers Mark Mallett and David Potts became the first to cross the bridge, partially on foot and partially by truck. SCI then worked throughout the winter, paving the bridge deck, placing bridge concrete barrier guardrails which also act as wind barriers, placing bridge deck and navigational lighting, constructing the Borden-Carleton toll plaza, and finishing the New Brunswick and Prince Edward Island approach roads. In separate construction, the federal and provincial governments built a new commercial and tourist development on the abandoned CN rail yards in Borden-Carleton, with phase I of this facility opening in spring 1997 as "Gateway Village". New Brunswick has never received similar federal support to improve the economy of Cape Tormentine, which has become a shadow of its former role in PEI transportation history, although in recent years a new eco-tourist and visitor centre was opened on Jourimain Island near the western end of the bridge.

=== Official opening ===
The official opening for the bridge took place on May 31, 1997, with the first vehicle traffic crossing at approximately 5:00 p.m. ADT following a nationally televised ceremony which aired on CBC and included a sailpast of the schooner Bluenose II and several Canadian Coast Guard ships, a flyover by the Snowbirds, and an emotional farewell to the beloved ferries which made their final crossings that evening. It is estimated that almost 75,000 people participated in a "Bridge Walk" and "Bridge Run" during the hours immediately prior to the opening for traffic.

BridgeFest '97 began on Friday, May 30, starting with the run in the morning, and then the walk continuing for the rest of the day. Thousands of people walked across the bridge on Friday.

In the days following the opening of the bridge, ferry operator Marine Atlantic disposed of its four vessels. The ferry terminals and docks in both ports were removed over the summer of 1997.

=== Operation ===
The bridge is operated by Strait Crossing Bridge Limited (SCBL), a subsidiary of the Strait Crossing Development Inc. consortium which built the structure. SCBL will privately manage, maintain, and operate the bridge until 2032, when these operations will transfer to the Government of Canada.

The Government of Canada agreed to pay about $44 million a year for 33 years to Strait Crossing Development Inc., this being the subsidy which was formerly paid to Marine Atlantic to cover operating losses of the ferry system. These payments are in effect a mortgage and are being used by the developer to pay off construction costs. In 2032, the bridge's ownership will revert to the federal government.

All tolls charged by SCBL are revenue for the consortium. Toll increases are indexed to inflation and regulated by the federal government. The consortium has rarely commented upon the profitability of the bridge, but during the structure's 10th anniversary, it was revealed that there had been a 30% cost overrun in construction ($330 million). The consortium is forced to cover this out of toll revenue since the federal government ferry subsidy is used to pay for the original tendered price ($1 billion). Operating costs for the bridge have also proven expensive, with warranty repairs for asphalt adherence and the complete replacement of all bridge deck lighting cutting into profits. Toll revenues have fallen over 30% since the bridge opened, largely because of declining tourism traffic and domestic travel and currently range from $25 to $30 million annually. After expenses in 2003, the consortium received a year-end dividend of $2.6 million.

==== 2026 repaving ====
The most significant repaving in the history of the bridge happened in May and June in 2026.

== Effect ==
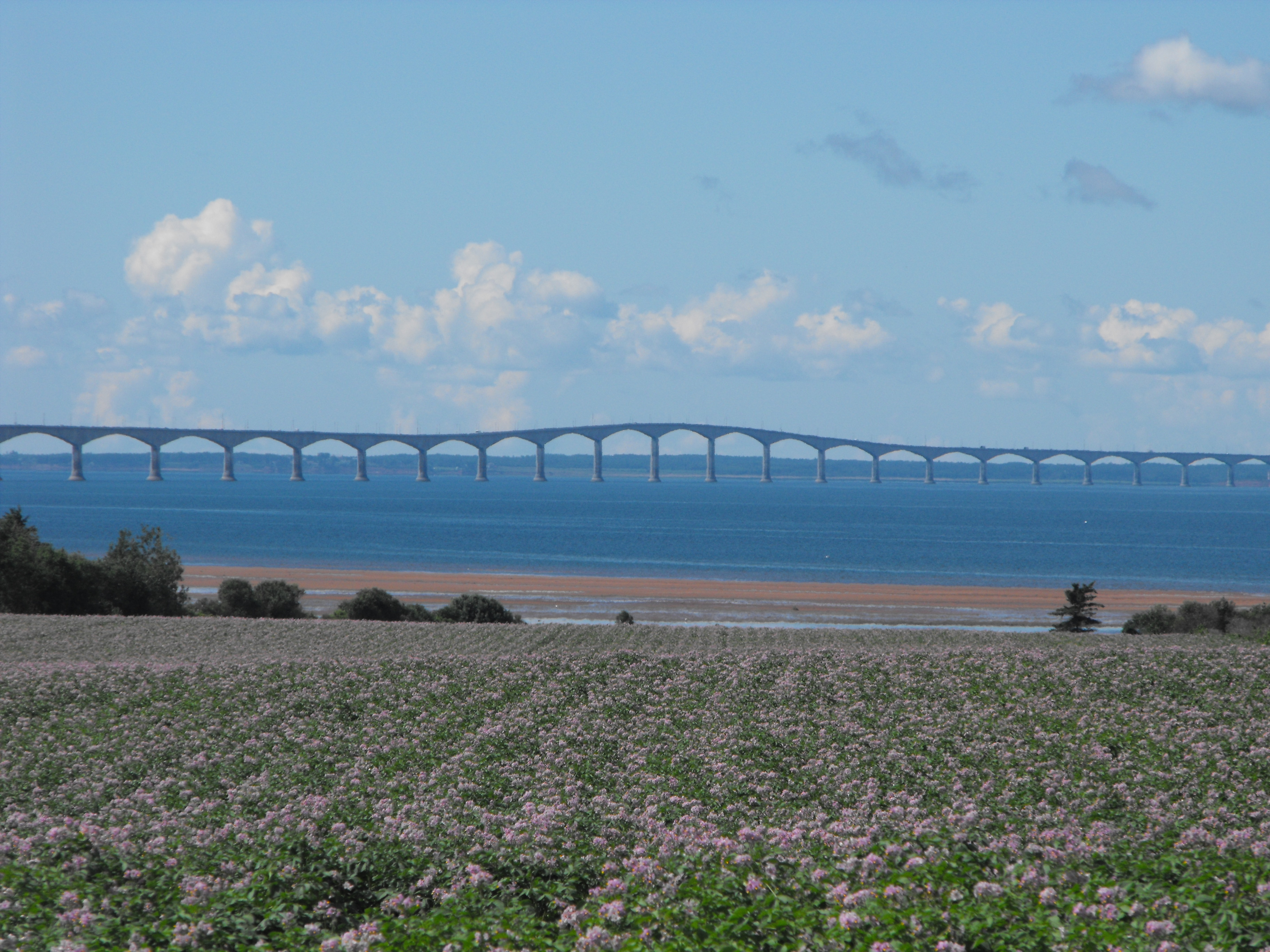
Confederation Bridge

The number of tourists visiting Prince Edward Island increased from 740,000 in 1996 (the year before the bridge opened) to 1,200,000 in 1997, but this dropped back to about 900,000 visitors annually.

As a way of further promoting the island's new accessibility, the province issued vehicle licence plates from 1999 to 2006 that featured a likeness of the Confederation Bridge amid the serial number. These plates, along with four other designs, started being replaced by a single design in 2013.

== See also ==
- List of bridges in Canada
- List of bridges by length
- Newfoundland–Labrador fixed link, a similar proposal to connect the island of Newfoundland to the Canadian mainland
