= Cap-Brûlé, New Brunswick =

Rural community in New Brunswick, Canada

Coordinates: 46°14′12″N 64°29′13″W

Cap-Brûlé is a Canadian rural community located in Westmorland County, New Brunswick.

It is an unincorporated community located on the Northumberland Strait immediately east of the community of Pointe-du-Chêne.

== See also ==
- List of communities in New Brunswick
