= Cape Tormentine, New Brunswick =

Village in New Brunswick, Canada

Cape Tormentine range lights
- Location: Westmorland County, Canada
- Coordinates: 46°08′06″N 63°46′20″W
- Cape Tormentine front range light
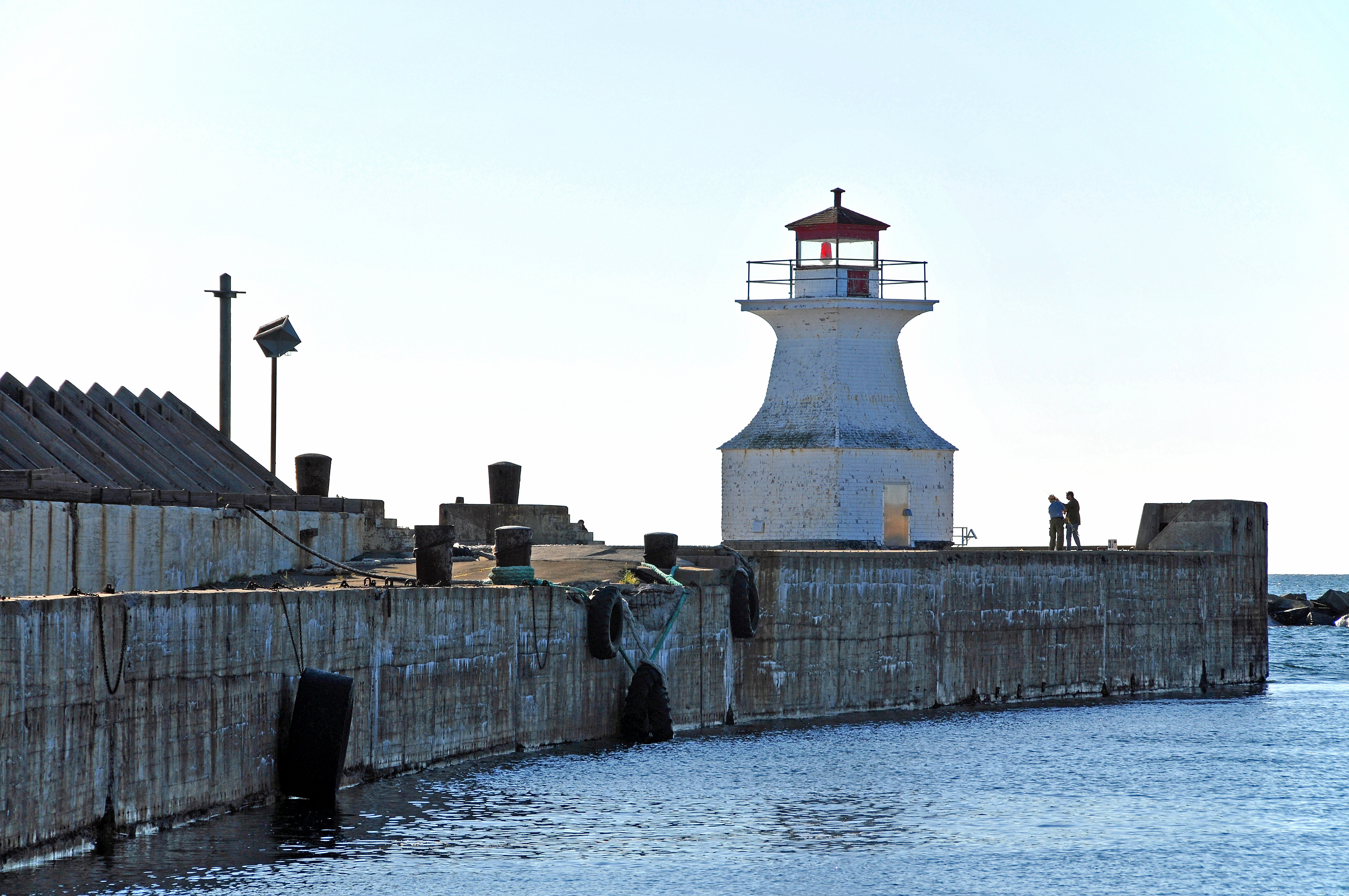
- Constructed: 1901; 125 years ago (first)
- Construction: masonry tower
- Height: 11 metres (36 ft)
- Shape: quadrangular tower with balcony and lantern
- Markings: white tower, red lantern roof
- Power source: solar power
- Operator: Canadian Coast Guard
- First lit: 1940s (current)
- Deactivated: 1997–1998
- Focal height: 12 metres (39 ft)
- Lens: seventh-order dioptric light
- Range: 5 nautical miles (9.3 km; 5.8 mi)
- Characteristic: Iso R 2s.
- Cape Tormentine rear range light
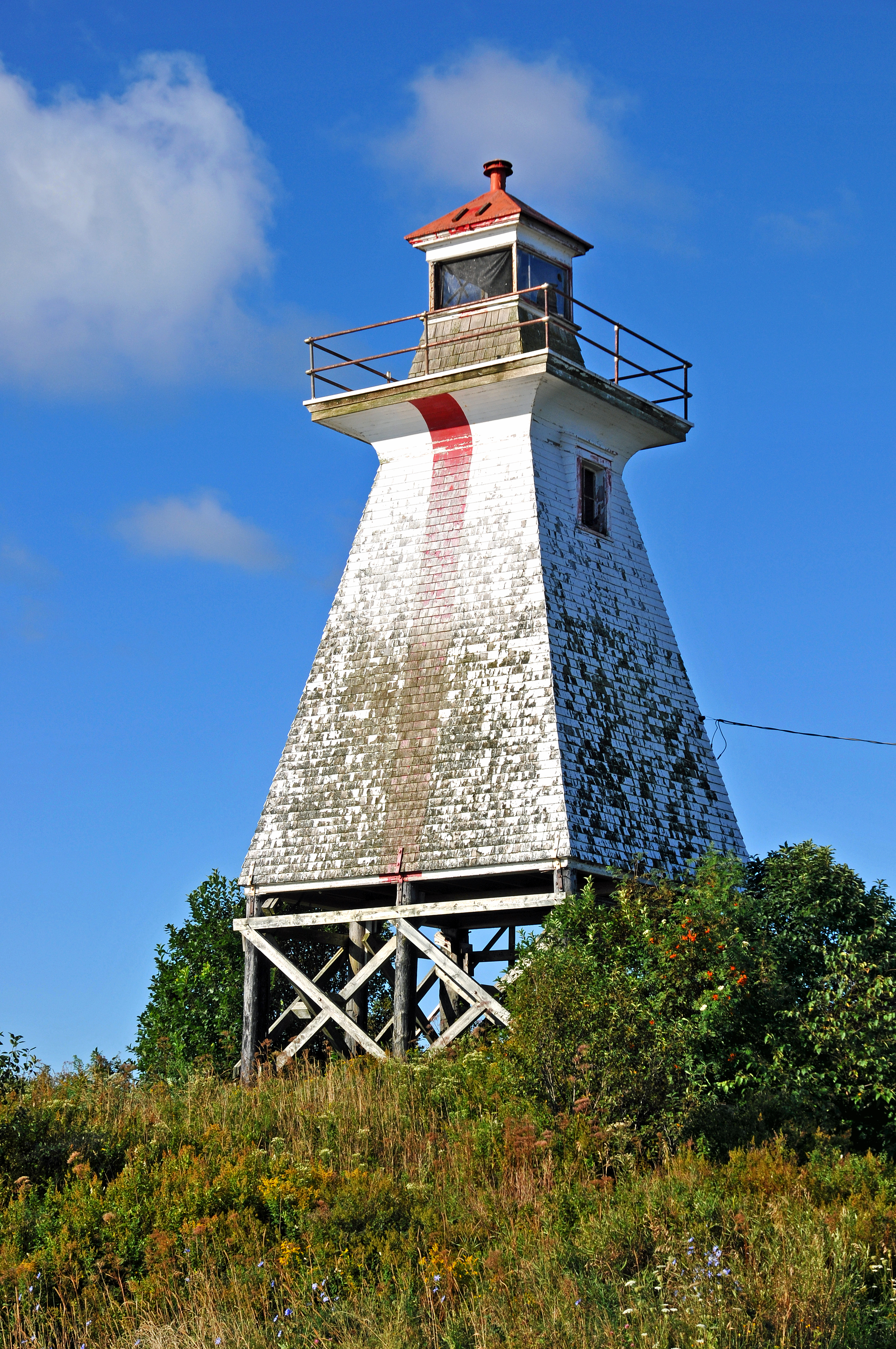
- Construction: structural wood

Cape Tormentine is a rural community and former local service district in southeastern New Brunswick, Canada. It is located on the Northumberland Strait at the Abegweit Passage, the shortest crossing between Prince Edward Island and the mainland. It once flourished as a transportation hub between New Brunswick and Prince Edward Island but has been in decline since 1997 when the ferry service was closed due to the opening of the Confederation Bridge. At the Canada 2011 Census the population was 108, three quarters what it was at the 2006 census.

Cape Tormentine is named for the eponymous cape. For the purpose of Statistics Canada's census it is in Botsford Parish.

== Freight and passenger terminal timeline ==
- 1827: the Northumberland Strait iceboat service, known as the Capes Route, begins operating across the strait to Cape Traverse, Prince Edward Island (PEI).
- 1873: under the terms of PEI joining Confederation, the federal government is obliged to provide "continuous steamship service" between the mainland and the island, and keep the iceboats running.
- 1886: the New Brunswick and Prince Edward Island Railway connects Cape Tormentine with Sackville, New Brunswick, and thence to the Intercolonial Railway of Canada's Moncton to Truro line.
- 1917: the iceboats are replaced by an ice breaking train ferry, the SS Prince Edward Island, built by Armstrong Whitworth in England and operated by Canadian Government Railways. A new port was built to accommodate the ferry. She was an effective ice breaker, and could carry 12 interprovincial rail cars.
- 1947: The ferry is replaced by the MV Abegweit. She measures 372 feet in length and displaces 7,000 tons. Her eight main engines generate 13,500 brake horsepower and drive propellers at both bow and stern. She could carry 950 passengers and 60 cars (or one complete passenger train of 16 railway cars).
- 1968: a second ferry, MV John Hamilton Gray is put in service on the PEI route.
- 1982: a new roll-on/roll-off ferry, also called the MV Abegweit replaces the first. She is a much larger and more capable vessel, measuring 401 feet in length and displacing 12,000 tons. Her six main engines generated 18,000 brake horsepower. She could carry 974 passengers and 250 cars (or 40 tractor trailer trucks or 20 railway cars).
- 1989: the last train stops at Cape Tormentine on New Year's Eve, following the closure of the Prince Edward Island Railway and the branch to Sackville. This branch has since been converted into a leisure trail, known locally as the Tantramar trail.
- 1997: with the opening of the Confederation Bridge between PEI and nearby Cape Jourimain, New Brunswick, the ferry service is ended. Northumberland Ferries Limited still operates a service on the Northumberland Strait, between Wood Islands, Prince Edward Island, and Caribou, Nova Scotia.
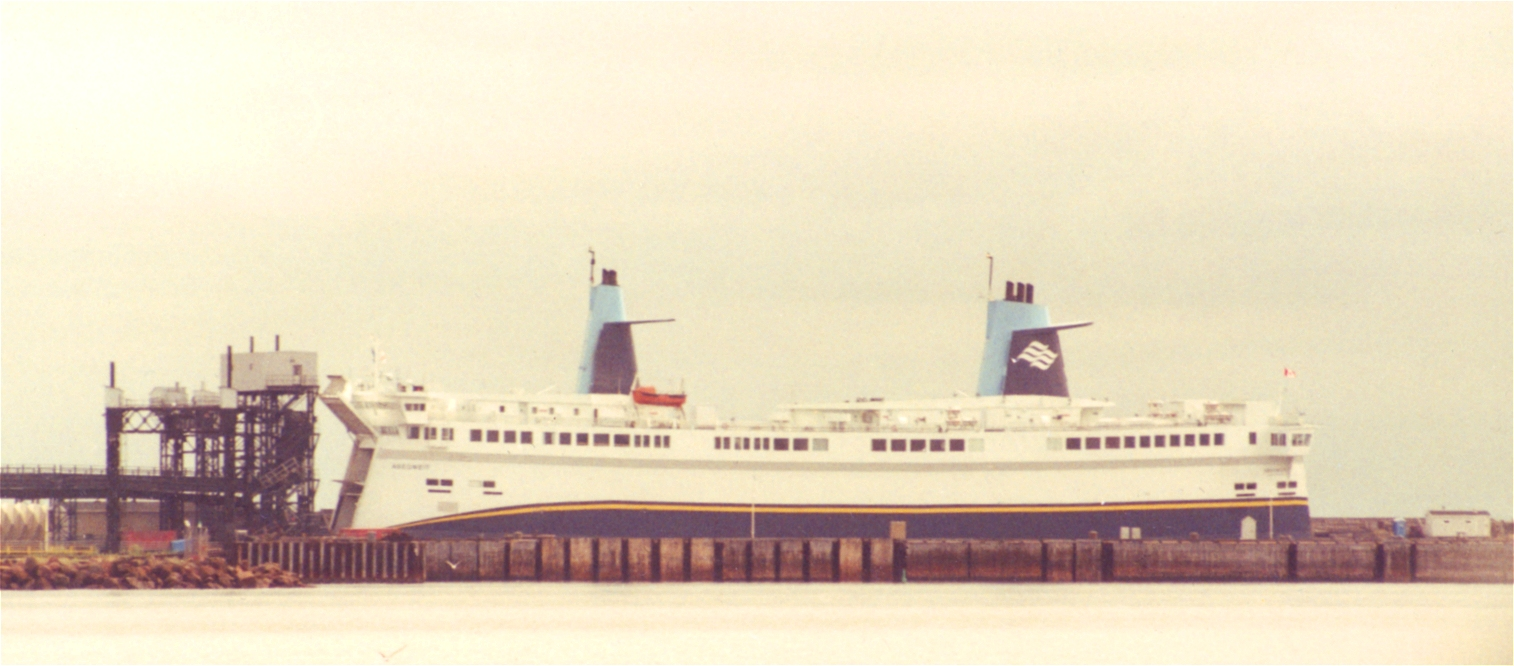
Roll-on/roll-off ferry MV Abegweit at Cape Tormentine

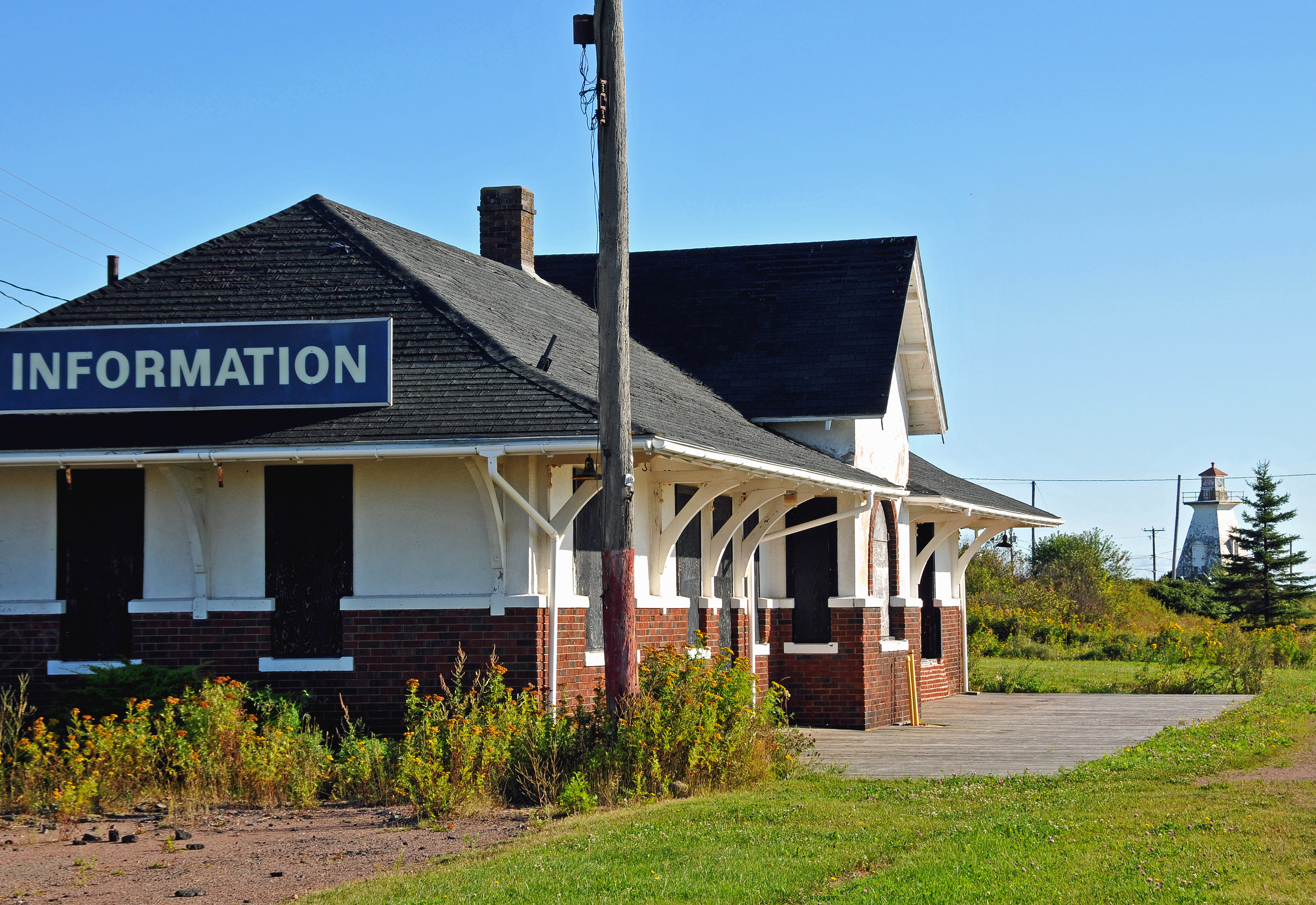
Former train station and lighthouse at Cape Tormentine

== Demographics ==
In the 2021 Census of Population conducted by Statistics Canada, Cape Tormentine had a population of 97 living in 49 of its 82 total private dwellings, a change of 26% from its 2016 population of 77. With a land area of 0.94 km^{2} (0.36 sq mi), it had a population density of 103.2/km^{2} (267.3/sq mi) in 2021.

== See also ==
- List of lighthouses in New Brunswick
