= New Brunswick and Prince Edward Island Railway =

Railroad company in Canada

Overview
- Reporting mark: NBPI
- Locale: New Brunswick and Prince Edward Island
- Dates of operation: 1881–1914

Technical
- Track gauge: 4 ft 8 1/2 in (1,435 mm) standard gauge

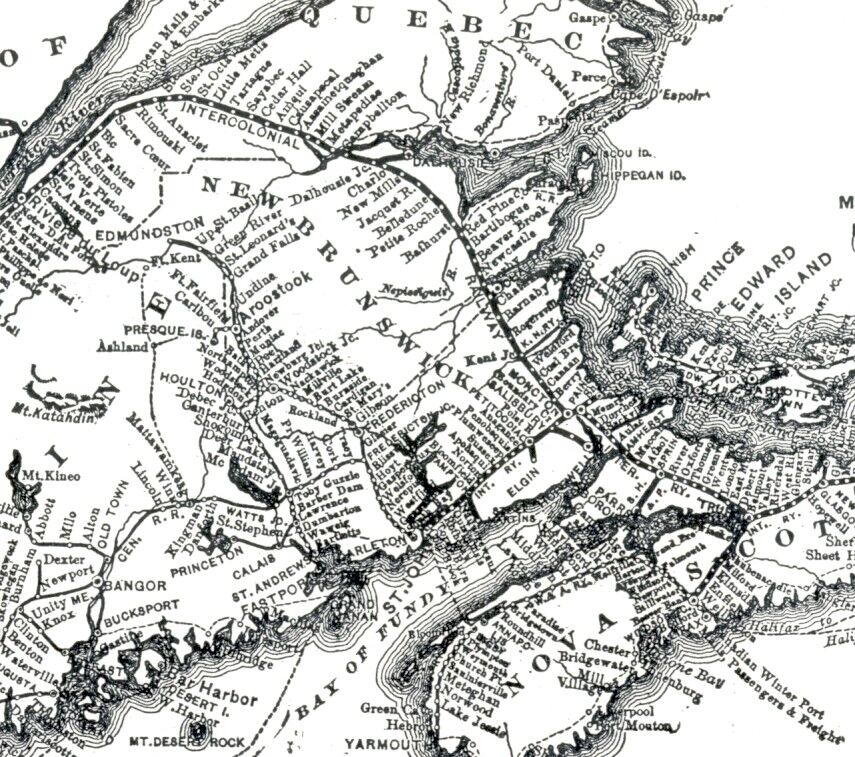
Intercolonial Railway in the late 1800s

The New Brunswick and Prince Edward Island Railway, was a company incorporated in 1874 to build a line from the Prince Edward Island ferry terminal at Cape Tormentine, New Brunswick to Sackville where it would connect to the Intercolonial Railway.

New Brunswick at the time was undergoing a large expansion of its railway infrastructure, with the miles of track doubling between 1880 and 1890. PEI joined the Canadian Confederation in 1873, under the terms of which Canada was required to provide a year-round link with the mainland.

Until the building of the railway, winter transport was by Northumberland Strait iceboat.

== Development ==
Incorporators of the company were Sackville businessmen, including Josiah Wood and Joseph Laurence Black. Local developers were initially unable to obtain federal funding for the enterprise, since they lacked political connections with Prime Minister John A. Macdonald's Conservatives in Ottawa. The local member of parliament, Albert James Smith, was in opposition in Ottawa.

After much effort, they found an ally in Samuel Leonard Tilley who in 1882 convinced the prime minister to budget $189,200 of federal money in support of the project. That year Wood became president of the railway, and became the Conservative Party candidate for the local riding of Westmorland, winning the seat in the 1882 Canadian federal election. He immediately set to securing federal support for the project.

Construction began in late summer of 1882. The project soon began to run out of funding. The provincial subsidy of $3,000 per mile was only to be upon completion. The company had insufficient stock subscriptions at $150,000, one third of which were owned by Wood. With the economic depression of 1882–1885 it was difficult to find investors. In 1884 Wood secured $150,000 in federal funding for the pier at Cape Tormentine. Due to political changes in Ottawa, Wood was finally able to secure a federal subsidy of $3,200 per mile in 1885. The entire 36-mile-long (58 km) line was in operation by September 1886. The line was immediately profitable.

It was reincorporated as the New Brunswick and Prince Edward Island Railway in 1889.

== Fate ==
It came under the control of the Canadian Government Railways in 1914 and was then operated by the Intercolonial Railway until that railway was taken over by Canadian National. In 1917 the first railcar ferry arrived at the Borden terminal on Prince Edward Island from Cape Tormentine.

The line was abandoned in 1989, the same year as the Prince Edward Island Railway. Today the Confederation Bridge handles all the traffic to the Island once transported by the New Brunswick and Prince Edward Island Railway. The attractive railway station at Cape Tormentine, built in the late 1930s, continued to be used as an information centre for ferry and marine traffic. With the opening of the Confederation Bridge in 1997, the station was closed. Today remains include the abandoned station and a few other rail structures, and an abandoned lighthouse.
