= MV Abegweit (1982) =

Former Marine Atlantic ferry

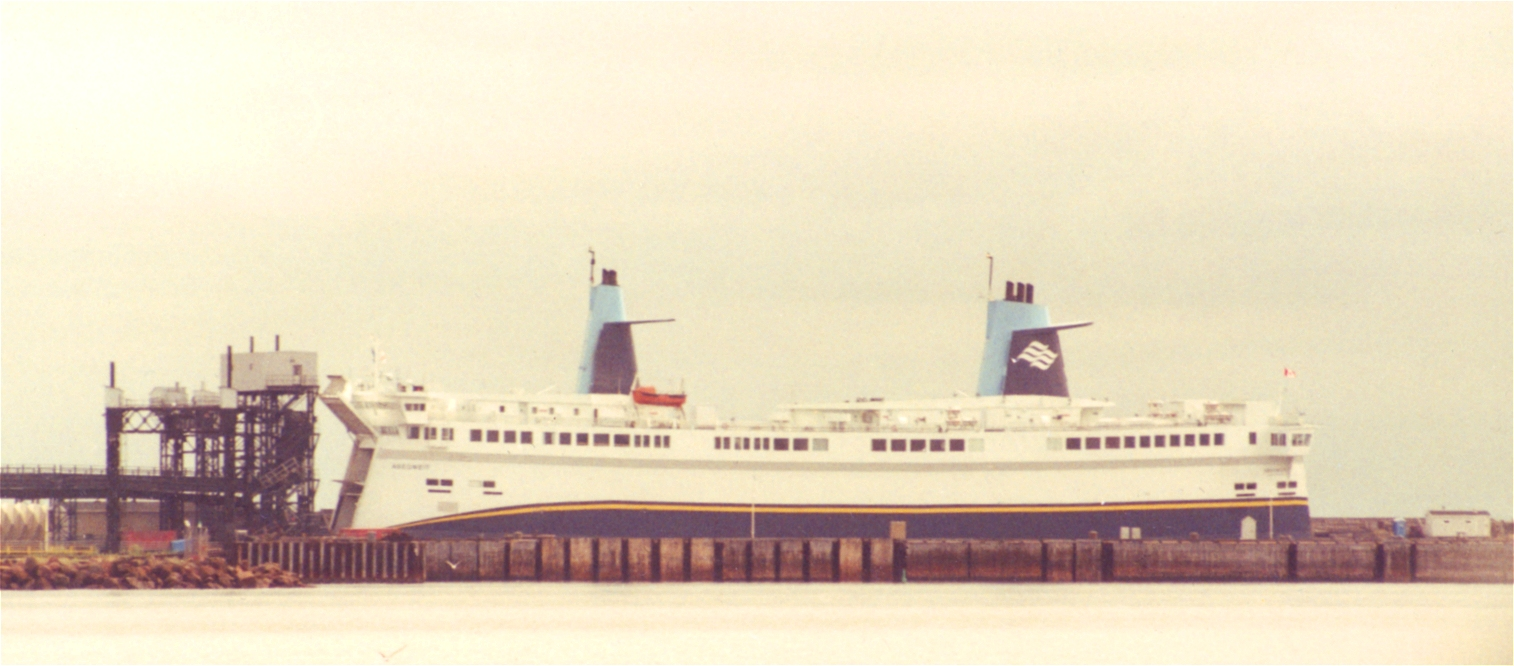
- MV Abegweit at Cape Tormentine

History
- Name: Abegweit
- Namesake: Abegweit is a Mi'kmaq Nation's name for Prince Edward Island
- Owner: Marine Atlantic
- Operator: Marine Atlantic
- Builder: Saint John Shipbuilding & Dry Dock, Saint John, New Brunswick
- Yard number: 1136
- Launched: 20 February 1982
- In service: 1982 or 1983
- Out of service: 1999
- Identification: IMO number: 7927843
- Fate: Scrapped 2004

General characteristics
- Type: Roll-on/roll-off ferry
- Displacement: 12,000 tons
- Length: 401 ft (122 m)
- Beam: 70 ft (21 m)
- Draught: 20 ft (6.1 m)
- Ice class: 1A Super Baltic
- Installed power: 6 main engines Ruston V16 diesel driven gearboxes
- Speed: 18 knots (33 km/h; 21 mph)
- Crew: 34

MV Abegweit was an icebreaking railway, vehicle, and passenger ferry which operated across the Abegweit Passage of the Northumberland Strait, connecting Borden-Carleton, Prince Edward Island to Cape Tormentine, New Brunswick, operating from 1982 until 1997. It was the second vessel to serve this route with this name: the first Abegweit (1947) operated between 1947 and 1982.

The name Abegweit is derived from the Mi'kmaq word for Prince Edward Island, Epekwit'k, meaning "cradled (or cradle) on the waves."

== Design and construction ==
In the late 1970s, Canadian National Railway (CN) underwent a corporate reorganization which saw all of its ferry services placed under a subsidiary named CN Marine. CN Marine began the process of planning the design with German & Milne for a replacement of Abegweit, a vessel which entered service in 1947.

The new vessel was to be named MV Straitway; unlike Abegweit it was designed as a roll-on/roll-off ferry which permitted faster loading and unloading. It was also custom-designed for the protected waters of Northumberland Strait. This permitted German & Milne to depart from traditional vessel design by eliminating the need for a conventional hull and bow. The new vessel was laid down as hull 1136 by Saint John Shipbuilding & Dry Dock at their shipyard in Saint John, New Brunswick and was launched on 20 February 1982.

== Naming ==
While the new vessel was still under construction in late 1981, it was decided that the name Straitway would be changed to Abegweit, the same name as the vessel being replaced. Since the new vessel would be taking the same name, CN Marine decided to rename the original vessel as Abby for its last months of service. Abby was discarded when the new Abegweit entered service in 1982. However, confusion over the name change led the public to incorrectly assume the new vessel's name was Abegweit II.

== CN Marine service ==
The new Abegweit was a much larger and more capable vessel than its predecessor: it was the largest on the Northumberland Strait service and became the flagship of this route. Measuring 401 feet (122 m) in length and displacing 12,000 tons, the ship had six main engines which generated 18,000 brake horsepower (13,000 kW) (13 MW) which drove two stern-mounted propellers and two bow thrusters and one stern thruster. It could carry 974 passengers and 250 cars (or 40 trucks or 20 railway cars) and had a hoistable car deck which doubled the number of cars on the B and C decks.

== Marine Atlantic service ==
In 1986, the Canadian federal government reorganized its east coast ferry services and changed the name of the Crown corporation from CN Marine to Marine Atlantic. On 31 December 1989 Abegweit's fellow icebreaking ferry John Hamilton Gray carried the last railway cars off Prince Edward Island with the abandonment of CN service on the island. That same year, discussion of a "fixed link" to replace the Borden-Cape Tormentine ferry service was revived. An 18 January 1988 plebiscite in Prince Edward Island gave 60% approval for design and construction of such a structure. On 31 May 1997 the Confederation Bridge was opened and ferry services were permanently suspended on this route. Ferry service remains available on the Wood Islands, Prince Edward Island, to Caribou, Nova Scotia route.

== Sale and disposal ==
Abegweit was used as a cargo vessel to haul Marine Atlantic equipment located at Borden and Cape Tormentine to the corporation's dock and storage facilities at North Sydney, Nova Scotia to be used on its Cabot Strait service. Abegweit was then laid up at the Sydport Industrial Park in Point Edward, Nova Scotia on the west shore of Sydney Harbour and was placed for sale. Due to its relatively young age, Marine Atlantic had considered retrofitting Abegweit with a hurricane bow and to lengthen to use it on the Cabot Strait service; the cost estimates for such modifications proved too high, and Abegweit was declared surplus. The ship remained at Sydport for two years before being sold in July 1999 to a firm named Accrued Investments Inc. of Houston, Texas. Abegweit was renamed Accrued Mariner and sailed to the port of Galveston, Texas that month.

The new owners were supposedly examining the possibility of using Accrued Mariner as a freight/railway ferry on the Great Lakes or possibly in the Gulf of Mexico, but this never happened and the ship remained in Galveston until February 2004. During this time it was again advertised for sale on eBay with a price of US$6 million at one point. Accrued Mariner was sold in January 2004 to the company Pelican Marine in India. The ship's name was changed to Mariner under the registered owner of Bridgend Shipping Ltd. of Kingstown, St. Vincent. The vessel sailed from Galveston at the end of February 2004 under the operation and management of Jupiter Shipmanagement (India). To burn off the fuel still onboard from the time at Marine Atlantic, some of which was topped off by Accrued Investments, the ship was operated at reduced speed on two engines. Mariner crossed the Atlantic Ocean, Mediterranean Sea, Suez Canal, Red Sea, and Indian Ocean arriving at the Alang Ship Breaking Yard in Alang, India in early May 2004. Lloyd's Registry shows the vessel as being scrapped on 9 May 2004.
