= Cape Jourimain =

Community in New Brunswick, Canada

- Cap-Jourimain
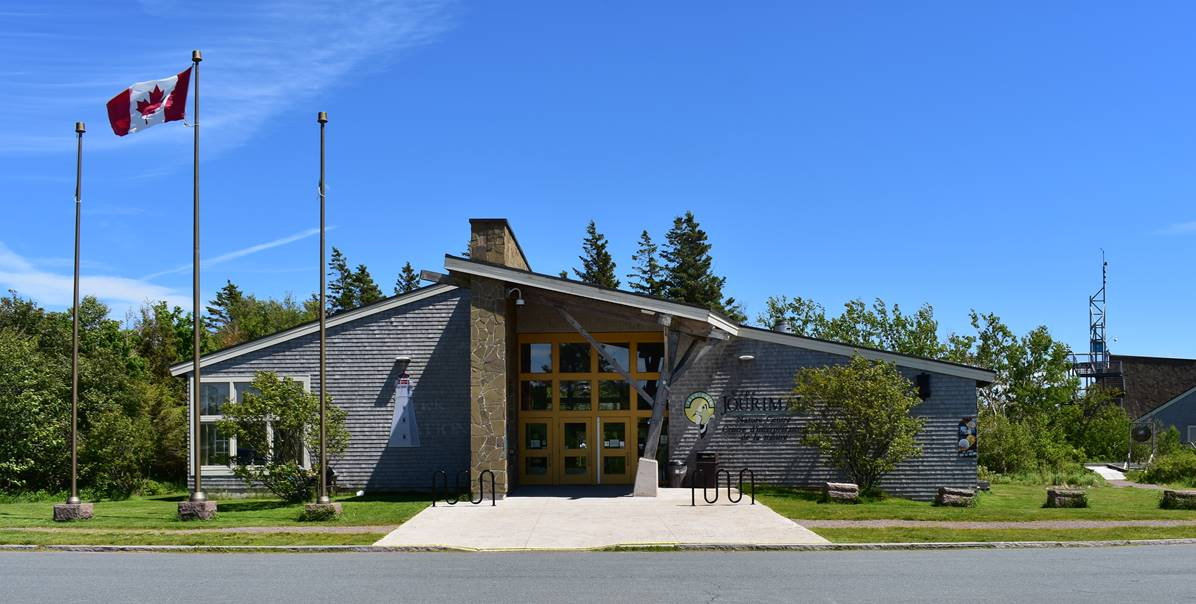
- Entry pavilion at the Cape Jourimain Nature Centre

- Location within New Brunswick
- Location: Bayfield, New Brunswick, Canada
- Coordinates: 46.161°N 63.816°W
- Area: 621 hectares (1,530 acres)
- Website: https://www.capejourimain.ca/

Cape Jourimain (French: Cap-Jourimain) is an area made of two islands and a section of mainland along the southwestern shore of the Northumberland Strait, three kilometres west of New Brunswick's easternmost point at Cape Tormentine. The two islands, Jourimain and Trenholm, have been connected to the mainland since 1966 by an artificial causeway. Cape Jourimain is the historic crossing point from New Brunswick (NB) to Prince Edward Island (PEI) and is host to the western end of the Confederation Bridge, Canada's longest fixed-link crossing. In 1980, the two islands, including a section of mainland, were designated as a National Wildlife Area (NWA) and in 2001 the Cape Jourimain Nature Centre, operated by a charitable nonprofit organization, was opened to the public.

== Early history ==
The Cape Jourimain area has been visited by humans, in some capacity, for at least 4,000 years. Evidence suggests that the Mi'kmaq hunted walrus, seal, and a variety of other species along the coast and that they used sea canoes to cross the Northumberland Strait from Cape Jourimain to PEI. Archaeological evidence suggests that the area was not settled by native peoples, but was instead used as a shared space due to its importance as a place of crossing.

Jacques Cartier landed on PEI in 1534; believing it was the mainland, he did not venture across the Northumberland Strait to the Jourimain Islands. Cape Tormentin, the original name for the greater Jourimain area, was first used by Nicolas Denys, a French merchant, in 1672, who likely learned about the area from Mi'kmaq fishermen. In the 1830s, the name Cape Tormentine was shifted to another community further down the coast and the area became known as the Jourimain Islands, which is theorized to be a misspelling of germain, a French word for "sibling".

After the British defeated the French in the mid-1700s, settlers from New England began re-establishing the areas of Sackville, Cumberland, and Amherst, later moving out towards Bayfield and the Jourimain Islands around the beginning of the 19th century. During this time, the natural ecosystems of the Jourimain Islands were subject to rapid change due to the introduction of intensive farming and agriculture.

== Crossing service ==
In 1827, the first winter crossing from Cape Traverse to Cape Jourimain took place. This route proved easier than the previous Wood Islands to Pictou route, and a deal was struck with Cape Traverse to have the permanent mail and passenger service run between the capes.

Special boats with runners were designed for crossing sections of board ice and the journey became famous for its harrowing conditions. In the 1880s, the iceboat service was relocated to Cape Tormentine and in 1917, the service was discontinued due to advances in the ice-breaking capabilities of ferries.

In 1811, Eliphalet and Hannah Allen, two of the first settlers after British occupation, built their home on Jourimain Island. In 1827, they opened the Allen Hotel to serve the crew and passengers of the iceboats, and in later years, provided room-and-board to workers of the lobster cannery, which opened on Jourimain Island in the late 1800s. The cannery, which was located between what is now Gunning Point and the Confederation Bridge, was operated by the Portland Packing Company and was primarily staffed by young Acadian women.

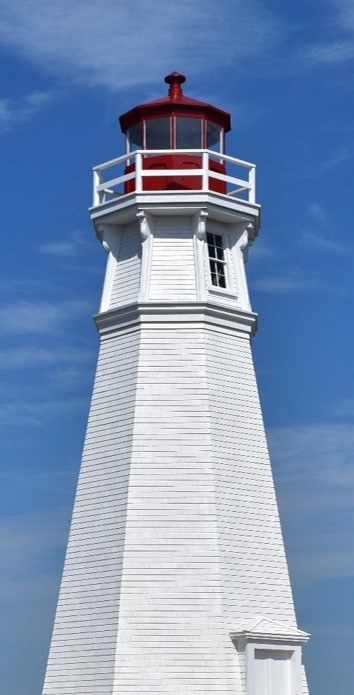
Cape Jourimain Lighthouse.

Throughout the 1870s and early 1880s, as a result of the iceboat service, the Allen Hotel, and a thriving lobster industry, Cape Jourimain reached its economic peak. However, by the 1890s, with the completion of a rail line to Cape Tormentine, as well as a new pier which was constructed in 1886, economic activity began to decline. In 1905, due to a decrease in lobster catches and competition from other canneries, the Cape Jourimain lobster cannery officially closed.

== Cape Jourimain lighthouse ==
In 1870, after nearly 30 years of petitions, a 15.5-m lighthouse was constructed at Cape Jourimain to help sailors navigate the narrow Strait. Lewis Wells looked after the lighthouse over the first winter, which remained non-operational until a temporary lighting apparatus was installed in April 1871. On May 15, John Bent was appointed as the first permanent lighthouse keeper, beginning a dynasty of lighthouse keepers spanning four generations.

In 1958, the light was fully automated, ending the service of the final lighthouse keeper, Merrill Trenholm. The lighthouse continued to operate for another 39 years before officially closing in 1997 when the Cape Tormentine ferry service was decommissioned as a result of the opening of the Confederation Bridge.

In 2001, the Cape Jourimain Nature Centre entered into negotiations with the Government of Canada to acquire the structure, and in 2015, ownership was officially transferred. In 2016, the lighthouse was moved for the third time throughout its history in an effort to protect it from coastal erosion, and in 2017, extensive renovations were completed in a bid to save the structure years of deterioration.

== National wildlife area ==
In the 1960s, a causeway was developed between the Jourimain Islands in an aborted attempt to build a fixed-link to PEI, cutting the saltwater marshes in half. This resulted in the establishment of a brackish marsh, which created valuable habitat for migrating ducks and other coastal wildlife.

In 1977, a proposal was brought to the Federal Government to have Cape Jourimain declared a National Wildlife Area, and in 1979, it was officially established. The 621-ha National Wildlife Area, which is managed by the Canadian Wildlife Service, encompasses Jourimain Island, Trenholm Island, Oak Island, and part of the mainland. The primary purpose for designating the area was to protect migrating birds, species at risk, and other wildlife and the ecosystems that they rely upon.

== Confederation Bridge ==
Periodic discussions regarding the installation of a fixed-link to connect PEI to the mainland had been ongoing since the late 1800s. Early proposals looked at developing a railway tunnel under the Strait, but this idea was later abandoned due to concerns over engineering and costs.

In the 1950s, a plan was proposed to build a causeway to PEI, and in 1966, the Government of Canada began moving forward with development, getting so far as to construct a causeway connecting Trenholm and Jourimain Island. However, this endeavour was ultimately aborted due to rising costs. It wasn't until 1987, after receiving a number of development proposals, that the Government began conducting feasibility studies for a fixed-link crossing.

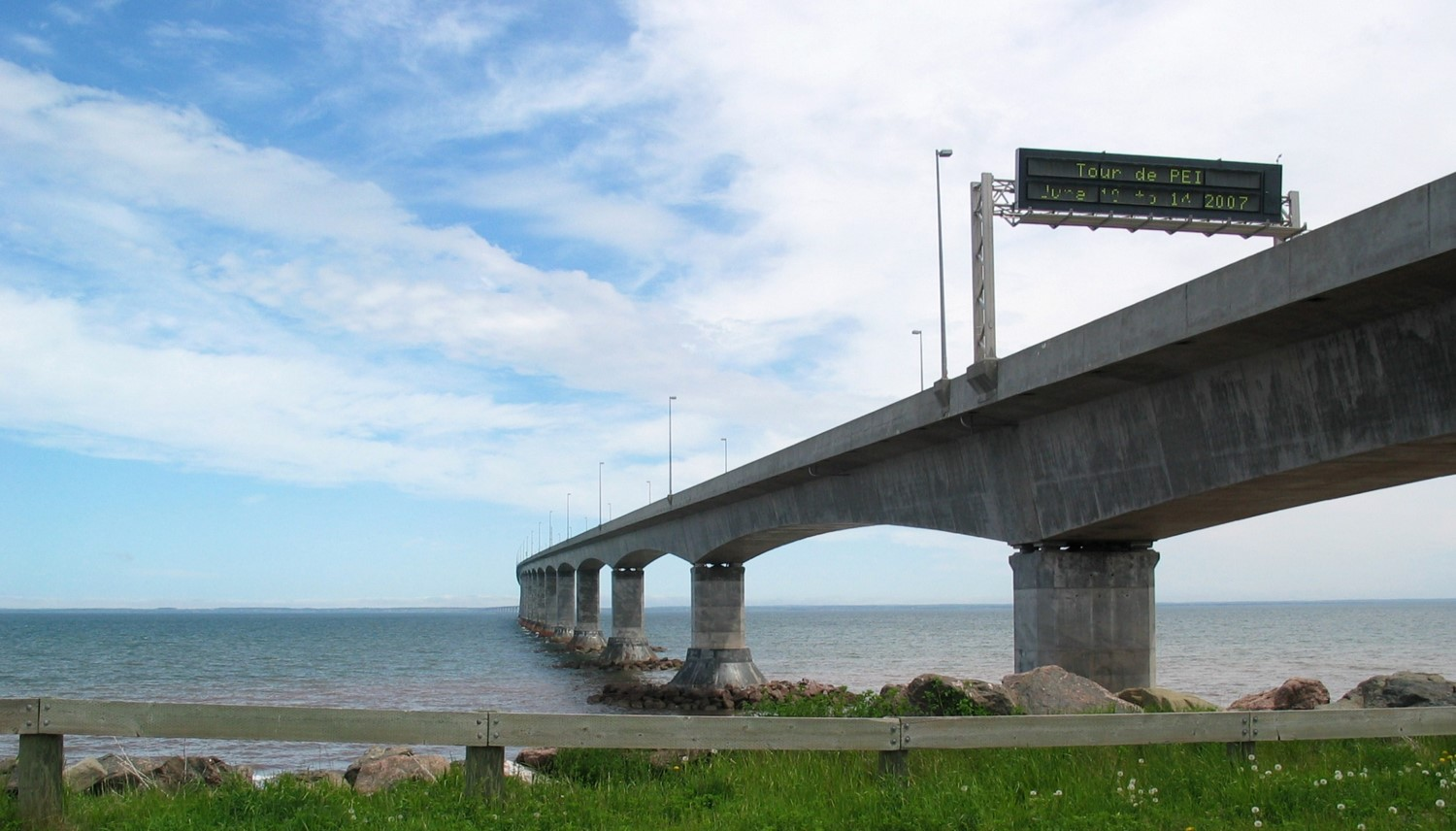
View of the Confederation Bridge from Gunning Trail.

In 1988, a plebiscite was conducted on PEI, which resulted in a majority vote in favour of constructing a bridge. This would ultimately result in the demise of the Cape Tormentine ferry service, which had been operating in some capacity since the turn of the 20th century. This proved to be a significant point of contention within nearby communities in both NB and PEI, with many voicing their concerns over the impacts that its removal would have on local jobs. Cape Jourimain in NB and Borden-Carleton in PEI were selected as the two end points due to these areas being the shortest distance between the two provinces. In 1992, after a number of studies and an extensive environmental impact assessment, Strait Crossing Joint Venture was granted the development contract and construction began in 1993.

The 12.9-km cantilever bridge was completed in November 1996 and officially opened to the public on May 31, 1997. On opening day, the bridge hosted an inaugural run, which had for 20,000 attendees. It has since become a notable tourist attraction and is famous for being the longest bridge to cross ice-covered water.

== Cape Jourimain Nature Centre ==
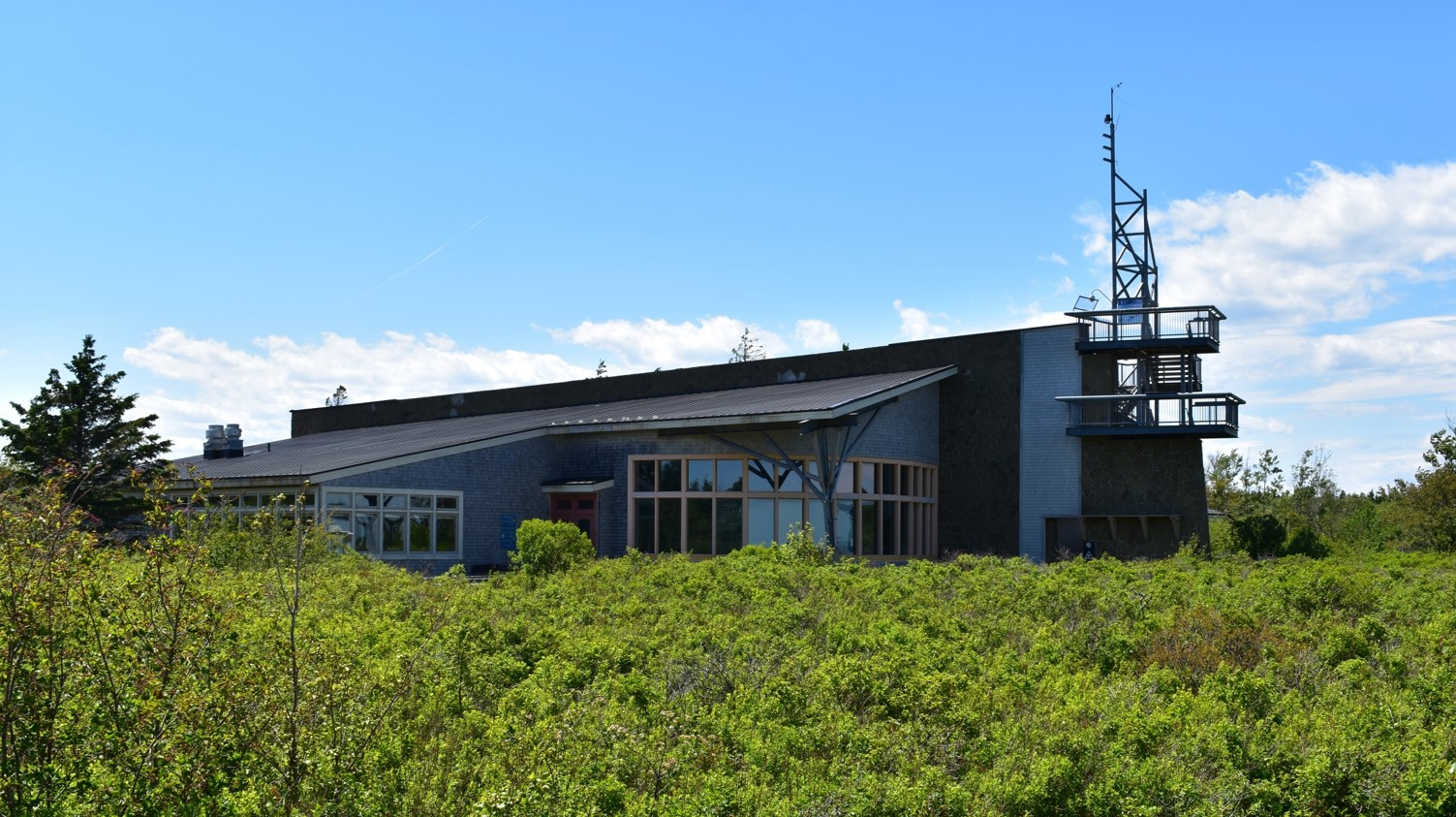
Cape Jourimain Interpretive Centre

In 1997, the same year that the Confederation Bridge opened, a group of passionate experts and local property owners established the Cape Jourimain Nature Centre Incorporated, a charitable nonprofit organization dedicated to providing eco-tourism opportunities and educational services to the public.

The organization was granted a lease for a section of the NWA near the Route 16 highway, where they were given permission to build and operate an eco-friendly interpretation facility which comprises an entry pavilion, interpretive centre, restaurant, observation tower, a network of trails, and a number of other amenities. The centre officially opened to the public in June, 2001.

== See also ==
- Bayfield, New Brunswick
- List of communities in New Brunswick
- List of islands of New Brunswick
- Confederation Bridge
