= Cape Traverse, Prince Edward Island =

Cape Traverse
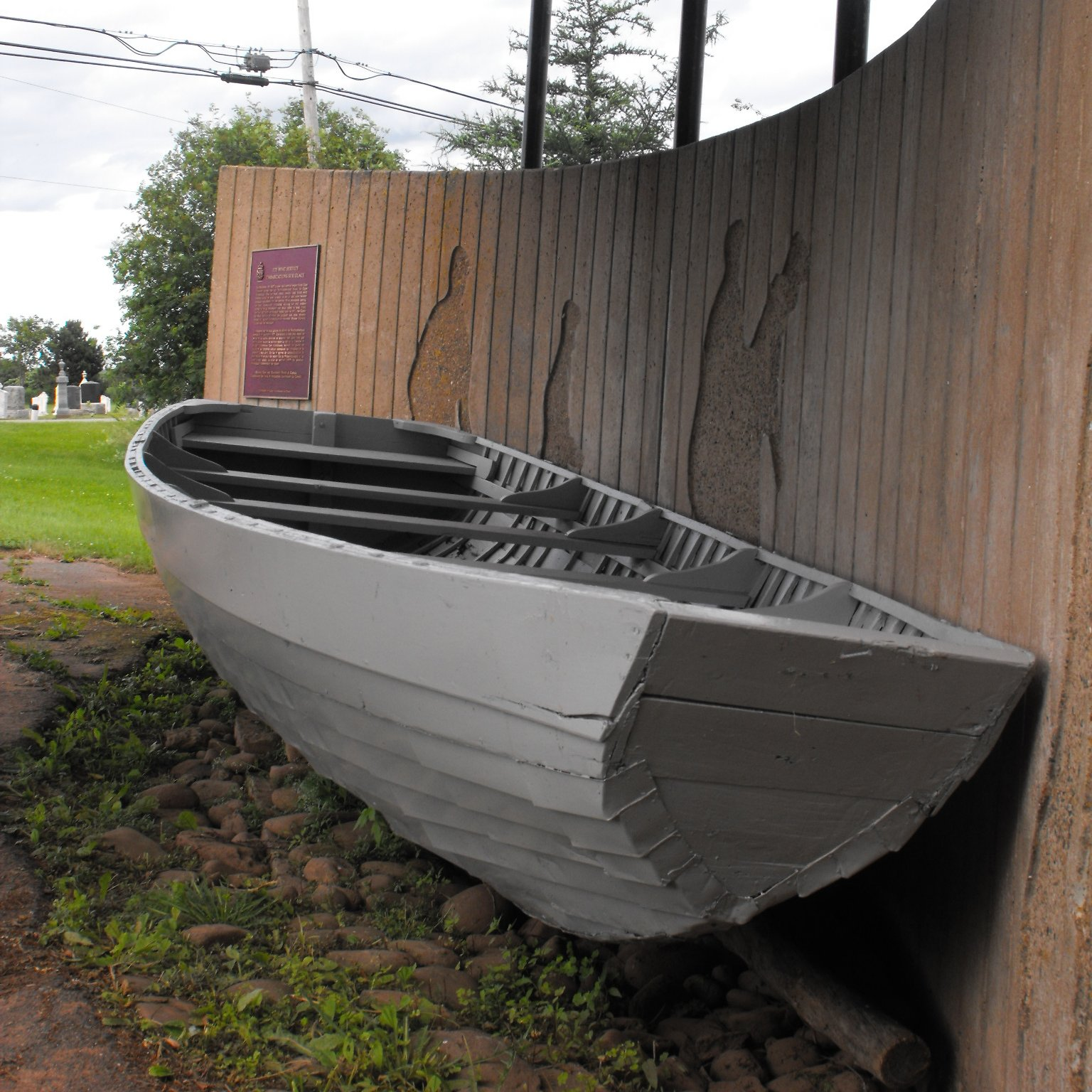
- Historic iceboat display at Cape Traverse
- Interactive map of Cape Traverse
- Coordinates: 46°14′33″N 63°38′15″W
- Country: Canada
- Province: Prince Edward Island
- County: Prince County
- Federal riding: Malpeque
- Provincial riding: Borden-Kinkora

Cape Traverse (/ˈtrævərs/ TRAV-ərss) is a community in Prince County, Prince Edward Island, Canada.

A winter iceboat service crossed the Abegweit Passage between Cape Traverse to Cape Tormentine, New Brunswick for many decades during the 19th century and early 20th century.

== Notable residents ==
- John Howatt Bell, 14th premier of Prince Edward Island
- Daniel Cobb Harvey Canadian historian and archivist
- Ephraim Bell Muttart, physician and political figure

== Highways ==
Cape Traverse is served by Prince Edward Island Route 10.
