= Pictou Island =

Island in Nova Scotia, Canada

Pictou Island Akukomijk
- Pictou Island in Nova Scotia
- Coordinates: 45°48′50″N 62°33′25″W
- Country: Canada
- Province: Nova Scotia
- Municipality: Pictou County
- Time zone: UTC-4 (AST)
  - Summer (DST): UTC-3 (ADT)
- Postal Code: B0K 1J0
- Area codes: 902, 782

Aerial view of Pictou Island

Pictou Island is a Canadian island located in the Northumberland Strait approximately seven kilometres (four nautical miles) north of Nova Scotia and nineteen kilometres (ten nautical miles) south of Prince Edward Island.

== Geography ==
The island has a length of 9.5 km (5.9 mi), a width of 2.5 km (1.6 mi) and a total area of approximately 12.8 km^{2} (4.9 sq mi). The island is administratively part of the Municipality of Pictou County. The island's highest elevation is 24 metres (79 feet) above sea level, and its current full-time resident population (as of 2016) stands at 28, with the seasonal population rising and lowering.

It is heavily wooded, with several clearings on the more sheltered south side. There is a small year-round population spread throughout the island, of which the majority make their living by fishing. The island has a public wharf located at the west end and a breakwater for mooring at the east end. There is also a community centre, church, a Pioneer Cemetery, fire department and several lighthouses located on the island.

== History ==
Pictou Island was claimed on October 17, 1809, by Charles Morris. That same year it was granted by the Crown to Admiral Sir Alexander Forrester Inglis Cochrane, likely as a reward for Royal Navy victories secured under his command in the Napoleonic Wars. Permanent European settlement of the island began in the 1810s.

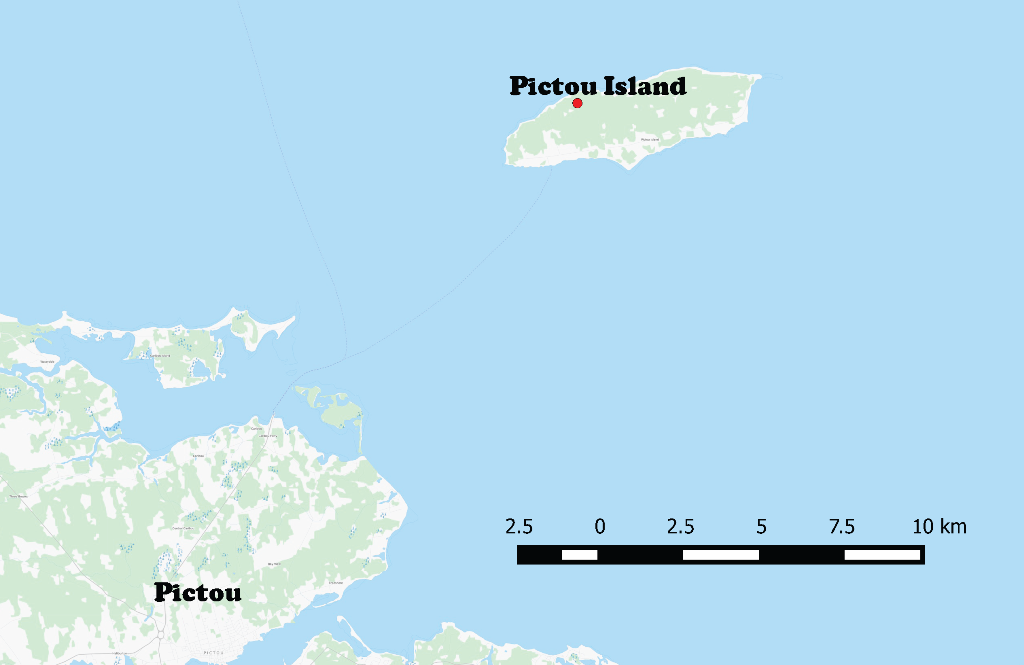
Map showing Location of Pictou Island compared to the Town of Pictou

Pictou Island receives no electrical power from the mainland. The residents supply their own energy with solar power, windmills and generators. There are no stores of any kind on the island, but residents can email or phone a grocery order into Sobeys (a national grocery chain), and the order will arrive by ferry or plane depending on the time of year.

A survey of island in 1830 indicated that there were 11 homes and a shipyard, then by 1887 there were up to 27 farms on the island, with farming and fishing were the main industries.

A one-room public school operates at the Pictou Island Community Centre, with a single part-time teacher for students up to grade 6, after which students begin correspondence studies. Generally, island students enroll in schools on the mainland of Nova Scotia once they begin grade 11, as many post-secondary programs do not accept a correspondence studies diploma.

The Community Centre is also home to a provincially sponsored CAP Site (see http://cap.ic.gc.ca/index.htm), which provides internet access to the public. Most island residents have access in their homes, through dial-up, and some are hoping for 'high-speed' soon.

A seasonal passenger-only ferry service begins operation in May and stops in November; Cessna airplanes operating out of an airport at nearby Trenton serve the island in the winter with mail and supplies. There is one main dirt road on the island that runs from one end of the island to the other that is maintained by the Nova Scotia Department of Transportation and also serves as a landing strip for the airplanes.
