= MV Abegweit (1947) =

Former ferry

Coordinates: 41.883947°N 87.611969°W

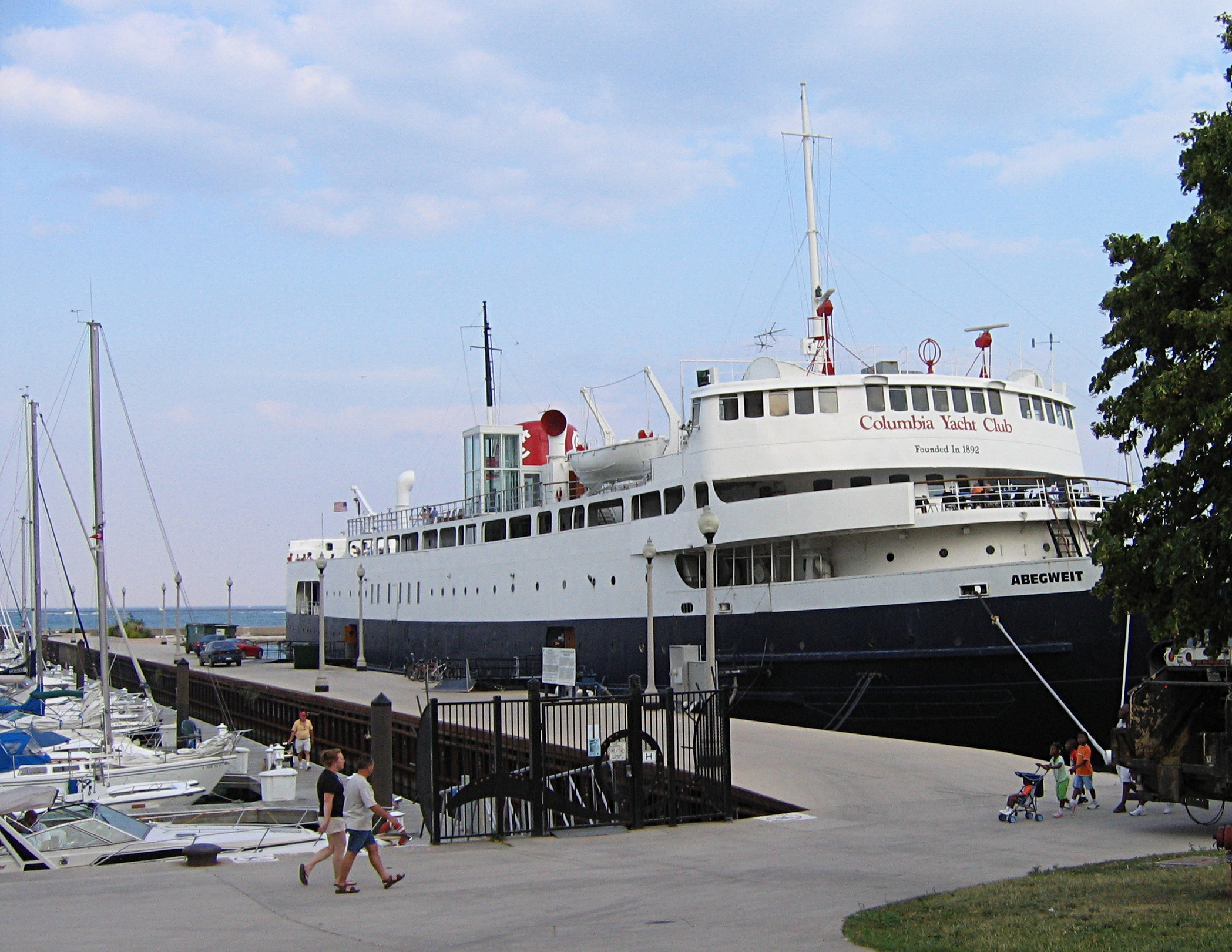
- The original ferry Abegweit is now owned by the Columbia Yacht Club of Chicago, Illinois, where she is used as a clubhouse.

History
- Name: Abegweit
- Namesake: Epekwit'k or Abegweit, the Mi'kmaq Nation's name for Prince Edward Island.
- Route: Port Borden–Cape Tormentine
- Builder: Marine Industries Ltd., Sorel
- Yard number: 144
- Laid down: November 1944
- Launched: 1946
- In service: August 14, 1947
- Identification: IMO number: 5000823
- Nickname(s): "Abby"
- Fate: Sold and is currently the Operations Center for the Columbia Yacht Club of Chicago, Illinois.

General characteristics
- Type: Ferry
- Tonnage: 6,994 GRT
- Length: 372 ft (113 m)
- Beam: 61 ft (19 m)
- Draught: 18 ft (5.5 m)
- Installed power: Eight 12-cylinder Dominion Sulzer diesel engines
- Propulsion: Diesel-electric; two bow and two stern propellers
- Speed: 12 knots (22 km/h; 14 mph)

MV Abegweit was an icebreaking railway, vehicle, and passenger ferry which operated across the Abegweit Passage of Northumberland Strait, connecting Port Borden to Cape Tormentine between 1947 and 1982.

The word Abegweit is derived from the Mi'kmaq word for Prince Edward Island, Epekwit'k, meaning "cradled (or cradle) on the waves."

== Design and construction ==
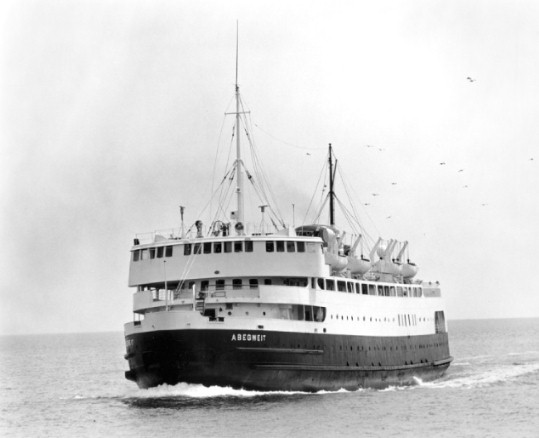
Abegweit crossing the Northumberland Strait in her glory days.

The first Abegweit was laid down as hull 144 in November 1944 and was launched in 1946 at the Marine Industries Limited shipyard in Sorel, Quebec. Her designers were the famous Montreal design firm of German & Milne. Her owners were Canadian National Railways (CNR), operator of the Borden–Cape Tormentine service from 1918 to 1977.

This vessel was the most powerful icebreaker in the world at the time of her commissioning on June 28, 1947, and was reportedly the heaviest vessel ever constructed in Canada as well. Her patron at the time of commissioning was Katherine Francis Bovyer, wife of Prince Edward Island premier J. Walter Jones. She entered service on August 14, 1947 and earned the hearts of Islanders who affectionately called her the "Abby".

She measured 372 feet in length and displaced 7,000 tons. Her eight main engines generated 13,500 brake horsepower (10 MW) and drove propellers at both bow and stern. She could carry 950 passengers and 60 cars (or one complete passenger train of 16 railway cars).

== Service ==
The growth of vehicle and rail traffic by the 1950s soon made her obsolete, and subsequent vessels introduced in the 1960s and 1970s could carry more vehicles and rail traffic and could load and unload with greater speed.

== Disposal and sale ==
The replacement for Abegweit was a vessel that was laid down as MV Straitway; however, while under construction CN Marine decided to name this new vessel Abegweit. To accommodate this change, the original Abegweit was renamed Abby in fall 1982 and she maintained this name through the end of her ferry service. Confusion over the name change led the public to incorrectly assume the new vessel's name was Abegweit II.

After finishing service on the Borden–Cape Tormentine route, the Abby was moved to Pictou, Nova Scotia during the winter of 1982–1983 and advertised for sale by CN Marine. She was purchased by the Columbia Yacht Club in Chicago, Illinois. Chicago city ordinances barred the club from constructing a clubhouse on the waterfront, so the club decided to purchase the Abby and permanently moor her at their facility. Abby left the Northumberland Strait for good in April 1983 and remains in use in Chicago.

== Columbia Yacht Club ==
Abegweit was purchased by the Columbia Yacht Club in 1983 and moved to Chicago that spring. In 1986, she appeared in an action sequence in the film, Running Scared. She continues to serve as club house for the ColYC. The ship had new hull paint applied in 2010, preserving the traditional color scheme.

== See also ==
- CN Marine
- MV Abegweit (1982)
