= Abegweit Passage =

Narrowest part of straight between New Brunswick and Prince Edward Island, Canada

Coordinates: 46°11′N 63°43′W

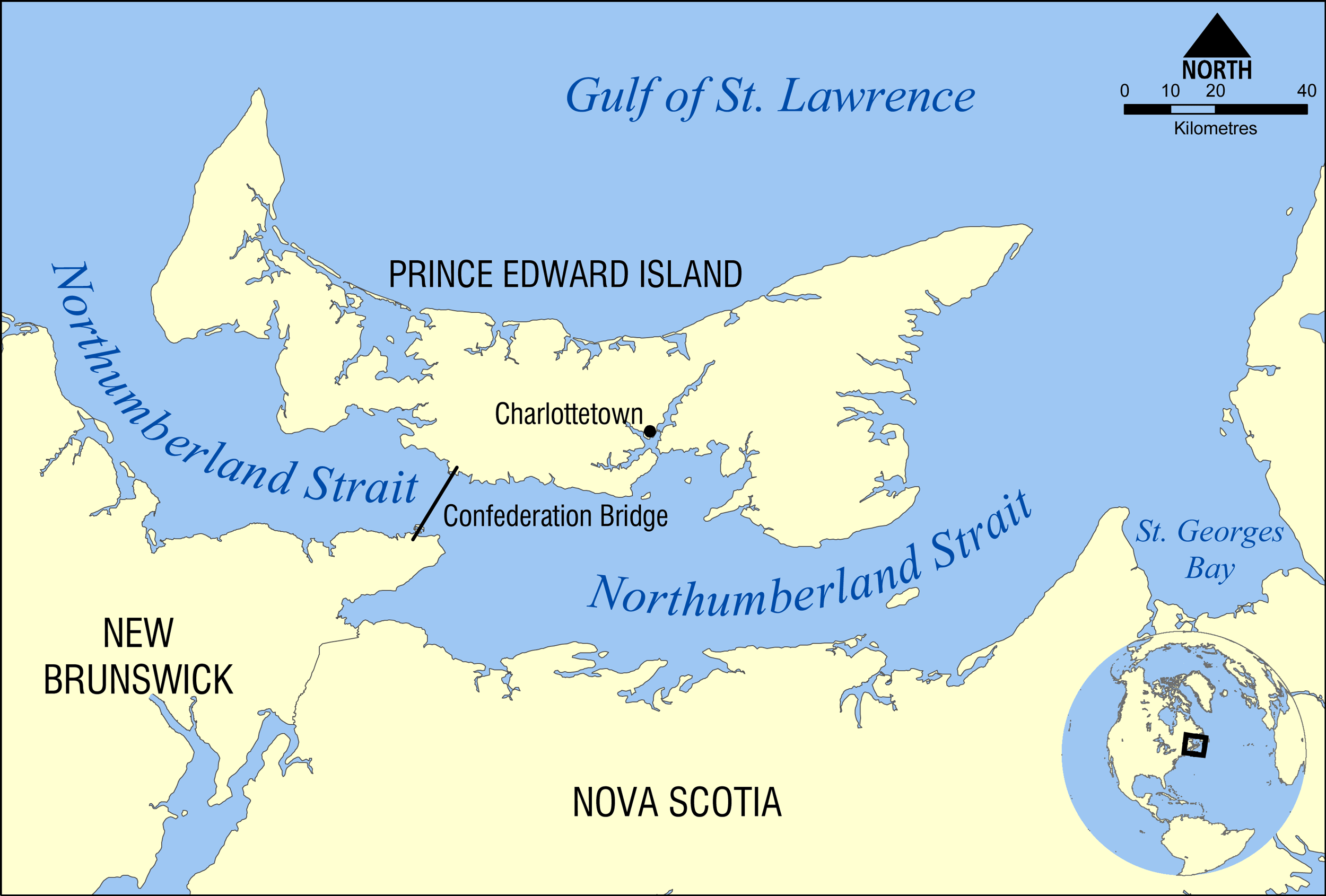
The Abegweit passage is the narrowest part of the Northumberland Strait, spanned by the Confederation Bridge.

Abegweit Passage is the narrowest part of the Northumberland Strait, comprising the 13-kilometre (8.1 mi) wide portion between Cape Traverse, Prince Edward Island, and Cape Tormentine, New Brunswick. Tidal currents in this area can reach up to 4 knots (7.4 km/h; 4.6 mph). This portion of the strait is now spanned by the Confederation Bridge.

The word Abegweit is derived from the Mi'kmaq word Abahquit, meaning "lying parallel with the land", or Epegweit, "lying in the water". It is often loosely translated as meaning "cradled on the waves."
