= Northumberland Strait =

Strait between Prince Edward Island, New Brunswick and Nova Scotia

Coordinates: 46°05′N 63°35′W

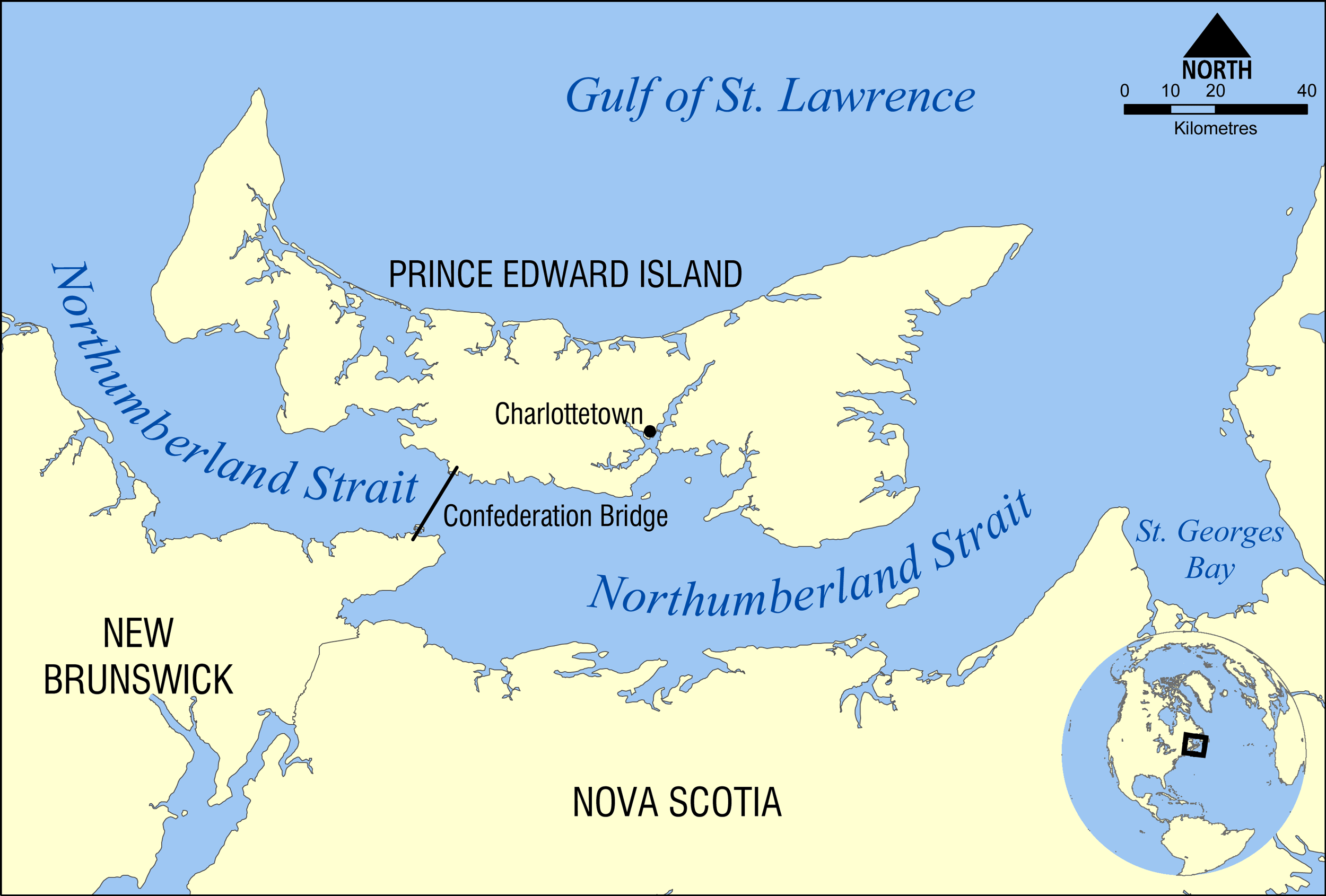
Map of the Northumberland Strait.

The Northumberland Strait (French: détroit de Northumberland) is a strait in the southern part of the Gulf of Saint Lawrence in eastern Canada. The strait is formed by Prince Edward Island and the gulf's eastern, southern, and western shores.

== Boundaries ==
The western boundary of the strait is delineated by a line running between North Cape, Prince Edward Island and Point Escuminac, New Brunswick while the eastern boundary is delineated by a line running between East Point, Prince Edward Island and Inverness, Nova Scotia.

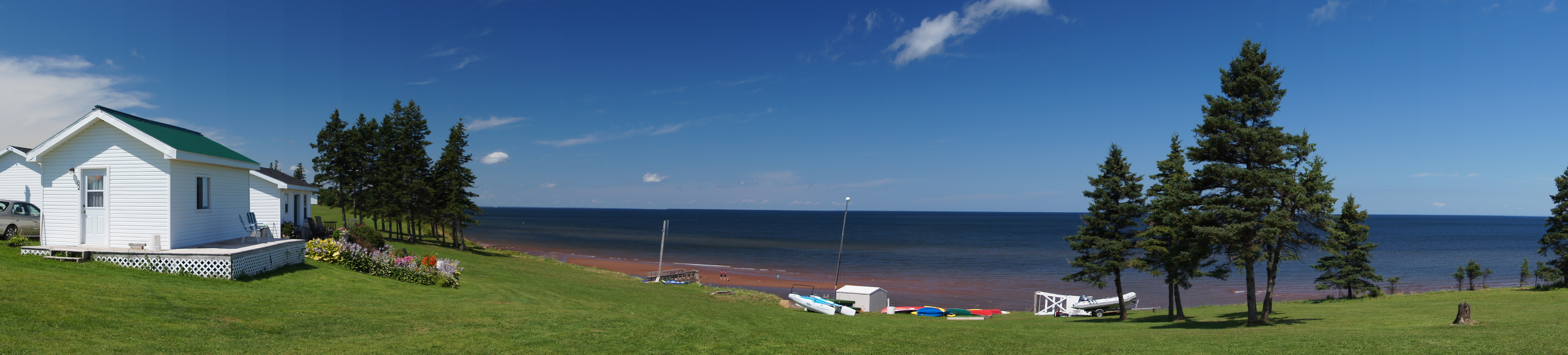
Northumberland Strait from the Gulf Shore Road, Nova Scotia

== Hydrography ==
The Northumberland Strait varies in depth between 17 and 65 metres, with the deepest waters at either end. The tidal patterns are complex; the eastern end has the usual two tides per day, with a tidal range of 1.2 to 1.8 metres, while the western end effectively has only one tide per day.

The strait's shallow depths lend to warm water temperatures in summer months, with some areas reaching 25°C, or 77°F. Consequently, the strait is reportedly home to the warmest ocean water temperatures in Canada, and some of the warmest ocean water temperatures on the Atlantic coast north of Virginia.

There are many sandy beaches along both the northern and southern coasts of the strait. These beaches, found in New Brunswick, Prince Edward Island, and Nova Scotia, are very popular with tourists.

During the winter months between December and April, sea ice covers the entire strait and Gulf of St. Lawrence.

== Geomorphology ==
While the western shores of Cape Breton Island and northeastern shores of the Nova Scotia peninsula are dominated by granite, sedimentary rocks along the central and western parts of the strait, as well as the entire south shore of Prince Edward Island, consist of sandstone, lending to beautiful sandy beaches with minimal coastal development. The largest island in the strait is Pictou Island.

Embayments of the strait include Egmont Bay, Bedeque Bay, and Hillsborough Bay on the north (Prince Edward Island) side, and Shediac Bay, Baie Verte, Amet Sound and Pictou Harbour on the south side.

== Settlements ==
Major communities on the strait include the cities of Charlottetown and Summerside, Prince Edward Island as well as the towns of Souris, Prince Edward Island, Pictou, Nova Scotia, and Shediac, New Brunswick.

== Transportation ==
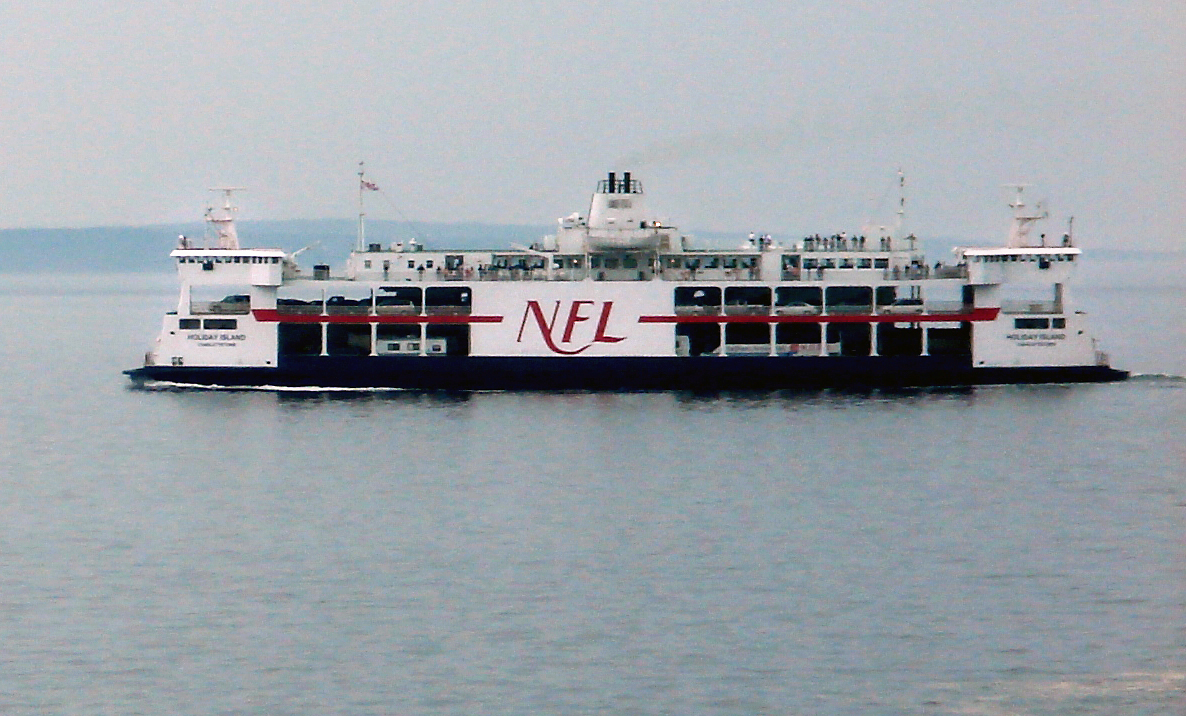
Northumberland Strait with MV Holiday Island, Pictou Island in background

=== Shipping ===
The Northumberland Strait is a minor shipping route, with ports such as Pugwash shipping salt, Summerside, Charlottetown, Georgetown and Souris shipping agricultural products and receiving petroleum and aggregate, and Pictou shipping forestry products and general cargo. Shipping has declined in recent decades with the decline of rail service to ports and the increased capacity of highways to larger ports outside the Gulf of St. Lawrence, which freezes in the winter.

Cruise ships regularly visit Charlottetown during summer and fall, and since 2012 a few smaller cruise ships have been visiting Pictou, NS.

=== Confederation Bridge ===
The narrowest part of the strait, the 13-kilometre (7–nautical mile) wide Abegweit Passage in the western part of the strait between Borden-Carleton, Prince Edward Island and Cape Jourimain, New Brunswick, is now spanned by the Confederation Bridge.

=== Ferries ===
The strait hosts three seasonal ferry services:

- Northumberland Ferries Limited operates a passenger/vehicle service between Caribou, Nova Scotia and Wood Islands, Prince Edward Island.
- A passenger-only ferry service operates from Caribou, Nova Scotia to Pictou Island.
- Groupe CTMA operates a passenger/vehicle service between Souris, Prince Edward Island and Cap-aux-Meules, Quebec.

All three ferry services are located in the eastern end of the strait and operate during the ice-free months from May - December.

There was a year-round ferry service that operated in the central/western part of the strait across Abegweit Passage between Port Borden, Prince Edward Island and Cape Tormentine, New Brunswick. This service operated from October 1917 until May 1997. Owned by the Government of Canada, it was one of Canada's busiest ferry services and was operated by various federal Crown corporations (Canadian National Railways, CN Marine, Marine Atlantic). The ferry service was replaced by the Confederation Bridge when it opened on 31 May 1997.

=== Undersea cables ===
Electrical

Maritime Electric supplies electricity to customers in Prince Edward Island. Although the utility does have some electrical generation facilities, since the mid-1970s the majority of Prince Edward Island's electricity has been purchased from NB Power and supplied via an interprovincial electrical interconnection. This interconnection consisted of two 23 km (14 mi) 138 kilovolt oil-filled submarine transmission cables installed 1975-78 under the Northumberland Strait at the western end of the Abegweit Passage between Murray Corner, New Brunswick and Fernwood, Prince Edward Island. Since the Northumberland Strait freezes in winter, the cables were designed to be protected from ice scouring and were copied from a Swedish design that was originally used to supply the island of Gotland in the Baltic Sea. They were replaced in 2017 by two new cables providing a capacity of 300 MW.

Pictou Island, in Nova Scotia receives no electricity from that province's utility, Nova Scotia Power. Residents must generate their own electricity from off-grid sources.

Telecommunications

Bell Aliant has two fibre optic telecommunications cables spanning Northumberland Strait to serve Prince Edward Island. The first is a submarine cable running from Caribou, Nova Scotia to Wood Islands, Prince Edward Island. The other runs through the Confederation Bridge; this cable replaced a submarine cable that used to run from Borden-Carleton, Prince Edward Island to Cape Tormentine, New Brunswick.

Eastlink has a fibre optic telecommunications cable connecting Gaspereau, Prince Edward Island with Port Hood, Nova Scotia.

=== Swim crossings ===
Swim-related details about crossings, tides, currents, marine life, and navigation can be found at OpenWaterPedia's Northumberland Strait page.

There have been several documented unassisted swim crossings of the strait, although there is no official body to verify these claims. All documented single and double crossings except one have been at the western end of the strait across the Abegweit Passage.

The first documented single crossing of Abegweit Passage (approximately 14 kilometres (7.6 nmi)) with assistance was made by Evelyn Henry of Keppoch, PEI on July 15, 1951, when she swam from Cape Tormentine, NB to Borden, PEI in 8 hours, 47 minutes.

There have been two documented single-day double crossings of Abegweit Passage (approximately 27 kilometres (15 nmi)) with assistance to date:

- Jennifer Alexander of Halifax, NS, swam a double-crossing on July 26, 2007, in 19 hours, 17 minutes from Cape Jourimain, NB to Borden, PEI.
- Kristin Roe of Halifax, NS, swam a double-crossing on July 26, 2008, in 15 hours, 40 minutes from Cape Jourimain, NB to Borden, PEI.

The first and to date only, documented single crossing with assistance across the eastern end of the strait (approximately 24.5 kilometres (13.2 nmi) was made by Jill Leon of Charlottetown, PEI on July 31, 2013, when she swam from Caribou, NS to Wood Islands, PEI in 9 hours, 48 minutes.

== Cultural significance ==
The strait is famous in folklore circles for regular sightings of the Ghost Ship of Northumberland Strait, a flaming vessel which appears in the middle of the strait. The strait is also notable for the ice boats, small oared boats which made regular dangerous crossings of the strait in winter carrying mail and passengers before the era of ice breaking ferries.
