= Botsford Parish =

Botsford
- Parish
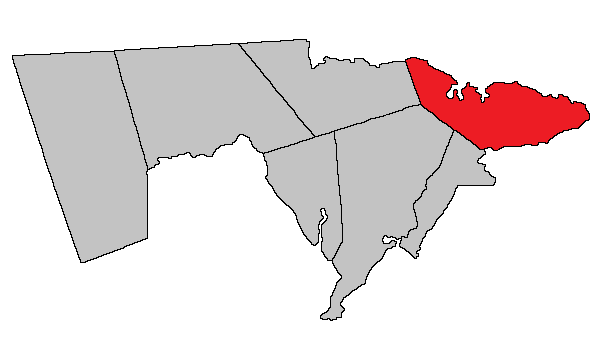
- Location within Westmorland County, New Brunswick.
- Coordinates: 46.19°N 64.60°W
- Country: Canada
- Province: New Brunswick
- County: Westmorland County
- Erected: 1805

Area
  - Land: 304.62 km^{2} (117.61 sq mi)

Population (2021)
  - Total: 1,120
  - Density: 3.7/km^{2} (9.6/sq mi)
  - Change 2016-2021: ▲5.9%
  - Dwellings: 978
- Time zone: UTC-4 (AST)
  - Summer (DST): UTC-3 (ADT)
- Figures do not include portions within the villages of Cap-Pelé and Port Elgin and the rural community of Beaubassin East

Botsford is a geographic parish in Westmorland County, New Brunswick, Canada. (Note: The Territorial Division Act divides the province into 152 parishes, the cities of Saint John and Fredericton, and one town of Grand Falls. The Interpretation Act clarifies that parishes include any local government within their borders.)

For governance purposes it divided almost entirely between the town of Cap-Acadie and the incorporated rural community of Strait Shores, small areas along its southwestern border belong to the Southeast rural district. (Note: Maps still visible as thumbnails show the current and previous governance boundaries.) All are members of the Southeast Regional Service Commission.

Prior to the 2023 governance reform, the parish was divided between the villages of Cap-Pelé and Port Elgin, the rural community of Beaubassin East, and the local service districts of Bayfield, Cape Tormentine, and the parish of Botsford.

== Origin of name ==
The parish was named in honour of Amos Botsford, then Speaker of the House of Assembly and MLA for Westmorland County.

== History ==
Botsford was erected in 1805 from all of the unassigned territory east of Sackville and Westmorland Parishes.

In 1850 the western boundary moved west to match that of Westmorland Parish, adding part of Shediac Parish. The western boundary was at the mouth of the Kouchibouguac River.

In 1894 the western boundary was altered on its northern end, the boundary with Shediac Parish now running through Cap-Pelé. This was clarified in 1904.

== Boundaries ==
Botsford Parish is bounded:

- on the north by Northumberland Strait;
- on the south by Baie Verte
- on the southwest by a line running north 38º 30' west (Note: By the magnet of 1867, when declination in the area was between 21º and 22º west of north.) from the southeast angle of lot number one, granted to Otho Reed, at the mouth of Gaspereau Creek in Port Elgin to a point about 1.6 kilometres northwesterly of the junction of Chemin des Moulins and Route 940 and about 450 metres from Square Lake, then running north 4º 30' east (Note: By the magnet of 1903, when declination in the area was between 22º and 23º west of north. The Territorial Division Act clause referring to magnetic direction bearings was omitted in the 1952 and 1973 Revised Statutes.) to the Northumberland Strait at a point about 375 metres east of the mouth of the Tedish River in Cap-Pelé.

== Communities ==
Communities at least partly within the parish. bold indicates an incorporated municipality

- Bayfield
- Bayside
- **Beaubassin East**
  - Botsford Portage
  - Comeau Point
  - Lake Road
  - Petit-Cap
  - Shemogue
  - Trois-Ruisseaux
- Cadman Corner
- **Cap-Pelé**
  - Bas-Cap-Pelé
- Cape Spear
- Cape Tormentine
- Chapmans Corner
- Hardy
- Johnston Point Road
- Little Shemogue
- Malden
- Mates Corner
- Melrose
- Murray Corner
- Murray Road
- **Port Elgin**
- Smith Settlement
- Spence Settlement
- The Bluff
- Timber River
- Upper Cape
- Woodside

== Bodies of water ==
Bodies of water (Note: Not including brooks, ponds or coves.) at least partly within the parish.

- Gaspereau River
- Timber River
- Amos Creek
- Fox Creek
- Grant Creek
- Lanchester Creek
- McKays Creek
- Robinson Creek
- Northumberland Strait
  - Abegweit Passage
- Baie Verte
- Shemogue Harbour
- Collins Lake
- Niles Lake
- Square Lake

== Islands ==
Islands at least partly within the parish.

- Ephraim Island
- Jourimain Island

== Other notable places ==
Parks, historic sites, and other noteworthy places at least partly within the parish.

- Confederation Bridge
- Murray Beach Provincial Park

== Demographics ==
Parish population total does not include portions within 2021 boundaries of Cap-Pelé, Port Elgin, and Beaubassin East. Revised census figures based on the 2023 local governance reforms have not been released.

Historical populations: Botsford Parish, NB
| Year | Pop. | ±% |
|---|---|---|
| 1991 | 1,328 | — |
| 1996 | 1,297 | −2.3% |
| 2001 | 1,216 | −6.2% |
| 2006 | 1,203 | −1.1% |
| 2011 | 1,074 | −10.7% |
| 2016 | 1,058 | −1.5% |

== Access routes ==
Highways and numbered routes that run through the parish, including external routes that start or finish at the parish limits:

- **Highways**
  - Route 15
  - Route 16 (TCH)
- **Principal Routes**
  - Route 955
  - Route 960
- Secondary Routes:
  - none
- External Routes:
  - Route 1 (TCH)
    (Confederation Bridge)

== See also ==
- List of parishes in New Brunswick
