= Nova Scotia Route 366 =

Highway in Nova Scotia, Canada

Route 366

Route information
- Maintained by Nova Scotia Department of Transportation and Infrastructure Renewal
- Length: 47 km (29 mi)

Major junctions
- West end: Trunk 6 in East Amherst
- Route 970 in Tidnish Bridge
- East end: Trunk 6 in Port Howe

Location
- Country: Canada
- Province: Nova Scotia

Highway system
- Provincial highways in Nova Scotia; 100-series
← Route 362	→ Route 368

Route 366 is a collector road in the Canadian province of Nova Scotia. It is located in Cumberland County and connects East Amherst at Trunk 6 with Port Howe on Trunk 6. At Tidnish Bridge the road connects to Route 970 at the inter-provincial boundary with New Brunswick.

== Communities ==
- East Amherst
- Tyndal Road
- Tidnish Bridge
- Tidnish Cross Roads
- Lorneville
- Amherst Shore
- Northport
- East Linden
- Linden
- Port Howe

== History ==
The entirety of the Collector Highway 366 was once designated as the Trunk Highway 66.

== See also ==
- List of Nova Scotia provincial highways
