= Baie Verte (Northumberland Strait) =

- Baie Verte is bordered by Nova Scotia and New Brunswick
- Location: Canada
- Coordinates: 46°00′N 63°56′W
- Type: Bay
- Part of: Northumberland Strait
- River sources: Gaspereau River, Tidnish River
- Primary outflows: Northumberland Strait
- Ocean/sea sources: Gulf of St. Lawrence
- Basin countries: Canada
- Surface area: 770 km^{2} (300 sq mi)
- Islands: Ephraim Island
- Settlements: Port Elgin

Baie Verte is a 770 km^{2} (300 sq mi) Canadian bay located on the north shore of Nova Scotia and eastern shore of New Brunswick. It is a sub-basin of the Northumberland Strait.

== Description ==
Baie Verte is one of the larger bays of the Northumberland Strait with its northerly limits at Cape Tormentine, a headland located immediately south of the community of Cape Tormentine, and its southerly limits at Aggermore Point, a headland located west of the community of Amherst Shore. It opens directly north and east onto the Northumberland Strait while its northern shore is formed by New Brunswick and its southern shore is formed by Nova Scotia.

== Islands ==
The only island of note is Ephraim Island, located in Upper Cape, New Brunswick.

== Marine and wildlife ==
Baie Verte is home to nesting colonies of sea birds and is a nursery area for fin and shell fishes. Its extensive salt marshes at the western end of the bay create important habitat for wetland animals.

== Recreation ==
The bay supports several recreational areas, primarily at Amherst Shore Provincial Park, Tidnish Dock Provincial Park, and Fort Gaspareaux National Historic Site of Canada.

== Communities ==
The village of Port Elgin is the largest population centre directly fronting the bay. The following communities are located along the bay's shoreline from north to south:

New Brunswick

- Cape Tormentine
- Cape Spear
- Upper Cape
- Bayside
- Timber River
- Port Elgin
- Baie Verte

Nova Scotia

- Tidnish Bridge
- Tidnish Cross Roads
- Lorneville
- Amherst Shore
