= Tidnish =

Community in Nova Scotia, Canada

Coordinates: 45°59′40″N 64°2′9″W

Tidnish in Nova Scotia

Tidnish is an unincorporated community in the Canadian province of Nova Scotia, located in Cumberland County. The community has a population of 1,327 and a community center located at 4358 Highway 366, RR#2. The name of the area derives from a Mi'kmaq word.

Community area includes Tidnish River, Tidnish Bridge and Tidnish Cross Roads.

Tidnish was hit by an F1 tornado on July 18, 1955.
