= New Brunswick Route 970 =

Highway in New Brunswick

Route 970

Route information
- Maintained by New Brunswick Department of Transportation
- Length: 11.4 km (7.1 mi)

Major junctions
- South end: Route 366 at Tidnish Bridge, NS
- North end: Route 15 / Route 16 (TCH) in Strait Shores

Location
- Country: Canada
- Province: New Brunswick
- Counties: Westmorland

Highway system
- Provincial highways in New Brunswick; Former routes
← Route 960	→ Route 1

Route 970 is a 11.4-kilometre (7.1 mi) long provincial highway located entirely in Westmorland County, New Brunswick, Canada. The highway connects Nova Scotia Route 366 at Tidnish Bridge, Nova Scotia to Route 15 and Route 16 at Strait Shores. The road is one of only three public roads crossing the provincial boundary on the Isthmus of Chignecto; the other two being Route 2/Nova Scotia Highway 104 (Trans-Canada Highway) and the Mount Whately Road. It is the only land crossing between the two provinces. Route 970 is the highest numbered provincial route in New Brunswick.

== Route description ==
Route 970 begins 80 metres (260 ft) from a junction with Nova Scotia Route 366 along the provincial boundary between Nova Scotia and New Brunswick. The highway travels north, roughly parallel to the Tindish River as it traverses southern Westmorland County, passing Big Cove to the west before entering Baie Verte. The highway turns northeast along Main Street before crossing two bridges near Fletcher Island, continuing northeast until reaching the community of Strait Shores. The highway turns onto Shemogue Road and comes to a terminus at a roundabout intersection, which serves as the southern terminus of Route 15, and an intersection on Route 16.

== Major intersections ==
The entire route is in Westmorland County.

Location	km	mi	Destinations	Notes
Nova Scotia–New Brunswick boundary	0.0	0.0	Route 366 to Trunk 6 – East Amherst, Lorneville	Southern terminus
Baie Verte	6.4	10.3	To Route 16 (TCH) (Main Street)	
Strait Shores	11.4	18.3	Route 15 / Route 16 (TCH)	Roundabout, Northern terminus
1.000 mi = 1.609 km; 1.000 km = 0.621 mi
