= Henry Ketchum =

Railway engineer in New Brunswick (1839–1896)

- Born: February 26, 1839; Fredericton, New Brunswick
- Died: September 8, 1896 (aged 57); Amherst, Nova Scotia, Canada
- Resting place: Sackville, New Brunswick
- Education: Civil Engineering, 1862
- Alma mater: University of New Brunswick
- Occupation: Railway engineer
- Known for: Chignecto Marine Transport Railway
- Spouse: Sarah E. Milner (m. 1866)

Henry George Clopper Ketchum (February 26, 1839 – September 8, 1896) was a railway engineer and businessman in maritime British North America and later Canada.

Born in Fredericton, Ketchum was the first graduate of the University of New Brunswick's undergraduate civil engineering program in 1862. His early career saw him working on construction of several rail lines in New Brunswick and a significant viaduct in Brazil. He was made an Associate of the British Institution of Civil Engineers in 1866, and a Member in 1878.

In 1875 Ketchum proposed his most ambitious project, the Chignecto Marine Transport Railway, a portage railway crossing the isthmus of Chignecto from the Bay of Fundy to the Gulf of St. Lawrence via the Northumberland Strait. Construction started in 1887, however financing failed in 1890 and work stopped in 1891 with the railway nearly completed. Ketchum continued to promote the project and worked to secure the remaining funds until his sudden death in 1896.

== Early life ==
Henry George Clopper Ketchum was born February 26, 1839, in Fredericton, New Brunswick. His parents, George Edward and Mary Ann (née Phillips) Ketchum, were United Empire Loyalists.

Ketchum married Sarah Elizabeth Milner on August 21, 1866, in Sackville, New Brunswick. They were married until his death in 1896, and had no children.

== Education and career ==
Ketchum attended grammar school at the Fredericton Collegiate School. In 1854, he enrolled in a lecture series given by English engineer Thomas McMahon Cregan at King's College in Fredericton. That same year, the college released engineering students to gain practical experience working in railway construction during the summer.

From 1856 to 1860, Ketchum worked on the European and North American Railway. He first worked as a surveyor on construction of the line from Halifax, Nova Scotia to Bangor, Maine, under Edward Barron Chandler. Later, he was promoted to assistant construction engineer under chief engineer Alexander Luders Light, working on the E&NA "Eastern Extension" line from Saint John to Shediac.

King's College became the University of New Brunswick in 1859, and instituted an undergraduate course in civil engineering. Ketchum earned the program's first diploma on June 5, 1862.

=== Santos and São Paulo Railway ===
In 1860, Ketchum was hired as a district engineer on construction of the Santos and São Paulo Railway in Brazil, under Scottish engineer James Brunlees. Ketchum oversaw construction of the complicated Mugi Viaduct. (Note: Some sources give the name as the Megy or Mogy Viaduct.) The viaduct consisted of eleven spans atop wrought iron and stone pillars as high as 150 feet (46 m), and was built with a curve radius of 30 chains. Under Ketchum's supervision the project was completed in seven months.

After completion of his São Paulo projects, Ketchum travelled to London, where he was granted a prize of £500 "in testimony to his ability as an engineer and his integrity and zeal as agent." He was made an associate of the Institution of Civil Engineers in 1866, later becoming a full member in 1878.

=== New Brunswick railways ===
Ketchum returned to New Brunswick in 1865, and was hired as resident engineer with International Contracting Company, which had been contracted for an extension of the European and North American Railway from Moncton to Truro, Nova Scotia. He was assigned to construction of a line from Painsec Junction east of Moncton to the border of Nova Scotia at the Missaguash River. Controversy erupted when the Premier of New Brunswick, Albert James Smith, insisted that the line follow a circuitous route to pass through his hometown of Dorchester. The resulting delays bankrupted the International Contracting Company, and construction was taken over by Clark, Punchard and Company. Ketchum contracted with the new financiers to complete the line as far as Dorchester. In 1868, a contract dispute led to a lawsuit in which Ketchum was eventually awarded a settlement of CA$95,000.

In 1869, Ketchum was hired as chief engineer on construction of the New Brunswick Railway's line from Fredericton to Edmundston, a track length of 170 miles (270 km). He also worked on the Quebec and New Brunswick Railway's line between Woodstock and Rivière-du-Loup around this time.

=== Chignecto Marine Transport Railway ===
In 1875, Ketchum opened a private consulting practice in Fredericton. At this time he began work on proposals for the Chignecto Marine Transport Railway, a portage railway crossing the isthmus of Chignecto between the Bay of Fundy and the Northumberland Strait, with a steamship connection to Prince Edward Island. His first letter describing the project was published in the Daily Telegraph of Saint John in April of that year. Ketchum's plans and blueprints for the project were destroyed in the 1877 Great Fire of Saint John.

Nonetheless, in 1881 Ketchum surveyed the isthmus at his own expense, and presented his results to the new Canadian government's Minister of Railways and Canals, Charles Tupper. With the government's support, Ketchum formed the Chignecto Marine Transport Railway Company with himself as managing director. Construction started in 1887, however the London banking firm providing financing for the project failed in 1890. With 16 miles (26 km) of rail bed constructed over the 17-mile (27 km) route and 13 miles (21 km) of track laid, the company ran out of money and construction stopped in 1891.

By 1896 the English financiers had raised the estimated CA$1.5 million needed to complete the project. However, with a deadline for the project's completion having passed, and despite Tupper's ongoing support, the Canadian government withdrew its subsidy for the project, and construction never resumed.

Ketchum died unexpectedly on September 8, 1896, at Amherst. He was buried in Tidnish Bridge, Nova Scotia, on a plot overlooking a stone arch bridge constructed for the marine railway. His remains were later exhumed and re-interred in Sackville, New Brunswick, to be near his widow's home.

== Legacy ==
Ketchum's will provided for a silver medal to be created as an academic prize at the University of New Brunswick. The Ketchum Memorial Medal was designed by the Allan Wyon Company of London, England, in the spring of 1897, and was first awarded that year. It is awarded annually to the graduating full-time civil engineering student with the highest standing.

The stone arch bridge constructed near Tidnish Cross Roads for the Chignecto Marine Transport Railway was listed on the Canadian Register of Historic Places in 1985, and stands to this day. The railway's lands were purchased by the government of Nova Scotia in 2012, and converted to a hiking trail. A 66-metre (217 ft) suspension bridge was constructed for the trail to cross the Tidnish River, and was named the Henry G. C. Ketchum Memorial Suspension Bridge.
