= Chignecto Marine Transport Railway =

Canadian portage railway

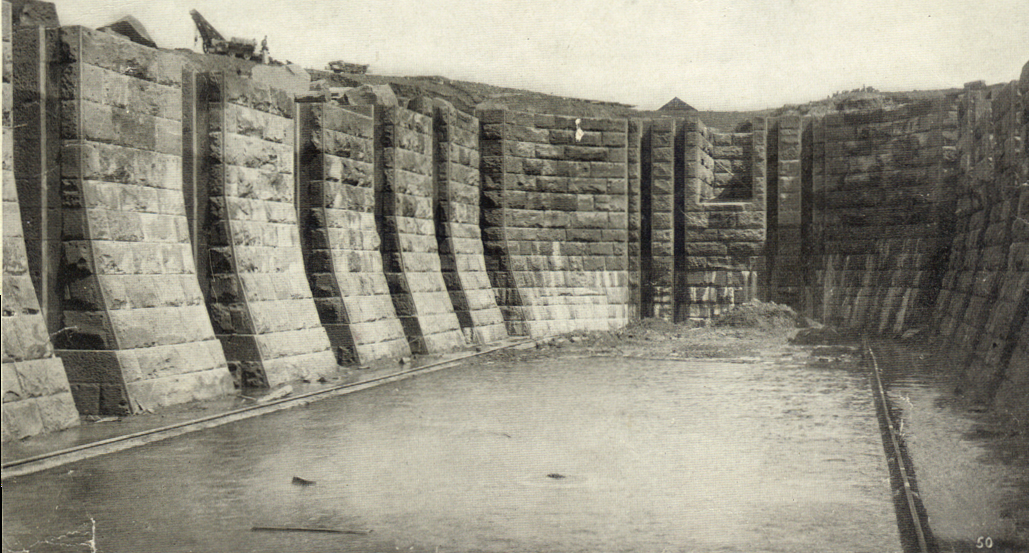
- The southern dock of the Chignecto Marine Transport Railway, on the Missaguash River, Fort Lawrence, Nova Scotia

Overview
- Status: Never completed
- Owner: Chignecto Marine Transport Railway Company
- Coordinates: 45°59′50″N 64°0′31″W

Service
- Type: Portage railway

History
- Work began: 1888
- Construction halted: 1891

Technical
- Line length: 17 mi (27 km)

The Chignecto Marine Transport Railway (sometimes referred to as the Chignecto Ship Railway or Baie Verte Ship Railway) is a historic Canadian portage railway located in Cumberland County, Nova Scotia.

With Canadian Confederation in 1867, a variety of canal-building projects were undertaken throughout the new country by the new federal government, including renewed interest in a canal that could transit the isthmus at Chignecto. The Chignecto Ship Railway project was first proposed in 1875 by notable civil engineer Henry Ketchum as a means to transport ships across the Isthmus of Chignecto, shortening the sailing distance between the Bay of Fundy and the Gulf of St. Lawrence by avoiding the necessity of sailing 500 nmi (930 km) around Nova Scotia. A canal had been proposed for the isthmus but financing was proving difficult to secure. Ketchum submitted his proposal to the Government of Canada in 1881. In 1882 the Chignecto Marine Transport Railway Company was incorporated as a federally chartered railway. It was financed by Baring Brothers and Company, London.

== Background ==
The Isthmus of Chignecto is a land bridge connecting the mainland province of New Brunswick with the province of Nova Scotia, which would otherwise be an island. It separates the Bay of Fundy from the Northumberland Strait by approximately 21 km (13 mi) at its narrowest point. The isthmus presents a barrier to marine traffic from ports on the Bay of Fundy and along the East Coast of the United States, which must instead sail a long route around the Atlantic coast of Nova Scotia to reach the Gulf of St. Lawrence and the St. Lawrence Seaway.

In 1685, during an inspection of the now defunct Acadian settlement of Beaubassin, intendant Jacques de Meulles reported that a portage of one league could be made by cutting a ditch, since the elevation is low. Various proposals for a canal crossing the isthmus were made as early as 1822.

Writing in the Daily Telegraph in 1894, one shipping agent suggested that a route crossing the isthmus would reduce the sailing distance from Pictou, Nova Scotia to Boston by 200 nmi (370 km; 230 mi), and to Saint John, New Brunswick by 400 nmi (740 km; 460 mi). An agent of a steamship company in Charlottetown suggested the routes to those ports from Prince Edward Island would save another 100 nmi (190 km; 120 mi) by crossing the isthmus rather than sailing around Nova Scotia.

== Design ==
The ship railway was designed to carry vessels weighing up to 2000 tons with a proposed transit time of 2.5 hours. Ships would be carried on a cradle forming an extremely wide rail car that straddled parallel twin standard gauge railway tracks, separated by 18 ft (5.5 m) to the centre of each track.

The tracks were built on a route that was almost perfectly straight for a distance of 17 mi (27 km) between the southwestern terminal on the Bay of Fundy, located at Fort Lawrence and the northeastern terminal on the Northumberland Strait, located at Tidnish Cross Roads.

At each terminal the twin railway tracks descended on an incline into a stone-lined basin similar to a drydock into which ships would float in and out. Each terminal had a lifting dock containing a steel grid measuring 235 ft (72 m) by 60 ft (18 m) connected to 20 hydraulic jacks. The grids supported the cradle which carried the vessel. The cradle was pulled from the lifting dock by hydraulic power and was then pulled along the length of the ship railway by 2 steam-powered locomotives.

The terminal at Tidnish Cross Roads was located on Baie Verte and had a moderate tidal range and was protected by two breakwaters. However, the terminal at Fort Lawrence was located on Cumberland Basin at the discharge point of the Missaguash River on the inter-provincial boundary with New Brunswick and had a high tidal range, necessitating the construction of a lock to accommodate different water levels.

== Construction and demise ==
Construction began in October 1888 and by 1890 the project was three-quarters complete with 16 mi (26 km) of the rail bed finished, and 13 mi (21 km) of the track laid. A bridge and large stone arch culvert were built at Tidnish Bridge - a community which received its name due to this infrastructure. And the terminals were built including the docks, breakwaters, and lock.

In fall 1890 the primary financiers of the project, Baring Brothers & Co., faced potential insolvency due to the financing of debts in Uruguay and Argentina. This created the Panic of 1890. By August 1891 work on the ship railway ground to a halt and would never restart. Ketchum appealed to the federal government for help in finishing the project but in 1892 the Parliament of Canada refused to extend the time period for the contract with the Chignecto Marine Transport Railway Company.

Ketchum never ceased lobbying for the project but died unexpectedly on September 8, 1896, in Amherst. He was buried in Tidnish Bridge at a cemetery that overlooked the unfinished ship railway.

The tracks were eventually pulled up and recycled while nature slowly claimed the rail bed. Some of the stones used for the breakwaters at Tidnish were moved in 1917 to Cape Tormentine and used in the construction of the docks used for ferry service to Prince Edward Island.

== Legacy ==
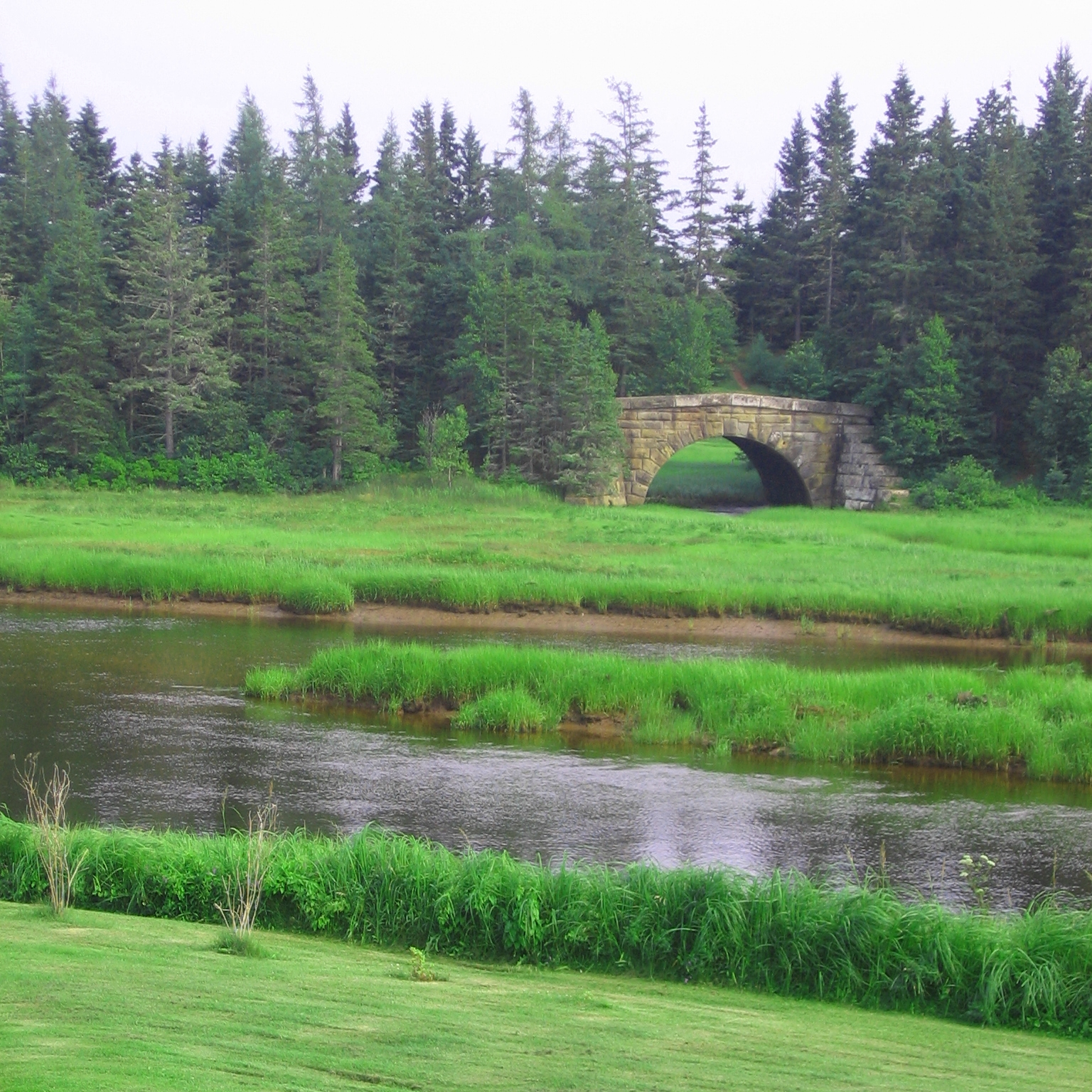
The Keystone Bridge at Tidnish Bridge, Nova Scotia.

The land for the railway's right-of-way was purchased by the Government of Nova Scotia in 2012. Most of the rail bed is still visible in aerial and satellite photos in the 21st century and supports several recreation trails.

The keystone bridge constructed near Tidnish Cross Roads remains, and now carries the Henry Ketchum Trail, a 4 km (2.5 mi) walking trail following the former rail bed, over the Tidnish River. The site of the Tidnish dock was made Tidnish Dock Provincial Park in 1982. A heritage plaque identifies the site where rock remnants and wood pilings can be seen at low tide. The remains of the dock at Fort Lawrence consist of stone work and left-over masonry. The bridge and both docks were listed on the Canadian Register of Historic Places in 1985.

The railway was designated a National Historic Civil Engineering Site by the Canadian Society for Civil Engineering in 1989.

== Other Chignecto canal proposals ==
With the area having been an important site for trade and military activity in the 1600s and 1700s, proposals to intersect the isthmus with a canal have emerged with various degrees of seriousness since the arrival of Europeans in Canada. The earliest proposals came from traders who frequented the area in the 1600s and 1700s. These early proposals occurred well prior to the creation of any strong central government in Canada which would have been able to undertake a project of this magnitude, making the Chignecto Ship Railway project (which occurred after the creation of a Canadian central government) the first serious attempt to intersect the Chignecto isthmus.

When the Chignecto Ship Railway went defunct in the 1890s, there was a decline in enthusiasm for canal-building projects across Canada more generally since many of the canals built in the late 1800s concluded well over-budget and did not deliver promised increases in commerce. This ended any prospects of building a canal at Chignecto until the 1930s when the idea of building a canal was investigated as part of Ottawa's fiscal stimulus program in response to the Great Depression. The thought was that the construction would stimulate the depressed region and the canal would increase the Maritimes' economic vitality over the long-term. A substantial investigation was undertaken by the newly formed Chignecto Canal Commission which concluded that such a canal was economically unviable due to changes in the political and economic landscape which had occurred since Henry Ketchum's project had begun in the 1880s. In the 50-year interim, the newly formed Government of Canada had constructed a network of railways throughout the Maritimes, meaning that any new canal would cannibalise traffic from existing public infrastructure. The commission also found that trade between the Maritimes and New England through any Chignecto Canal would have been insignificant; since both regions competitively produced the same types of goods, neither would have much advantage in trading with the other. The Chignecto Canal Commission concluded by stating "this Commission is strongly of opinion that the proposal to construct a canal at Chignecto offers no national or local advantages at all commensurate with the estimated outlay."

Following the Second World War there have been several proposals to build a canal at Chignecto although none of them have advanced far enough to materialise into any construction. In 1960, the Economic Research Corporation argued that a canal at Chignecto would help to reinvigorate a struggling Maritime Economy. More recently, celebrated Maritime scholar of public administration Donald Savoie argued for infrastructure spending on projects like Chignecto, which he argued to be key for Maritime economic development and is an undertaking that the federal government should have completed long before as part of its promises at Confederation in 1867.
