= Gaspereau River =

Gaspereau River may refer to the following rivers:

== Canada ==
=== New Brunswick ===
- Gaspereau River (Northumberland Strait), near Port Elgin
- Gaspereau River (Salmon River tributary), near Chipman

=== Nova Scotia ===
- Gaspereau River (Nova Scotia)
