= Fort Gaspareaux =

Former French fort in Canada

Coordinates: 46°2′34.4″N 64°4′14.7″W

- Strait Shores, New Brunswick, Canada
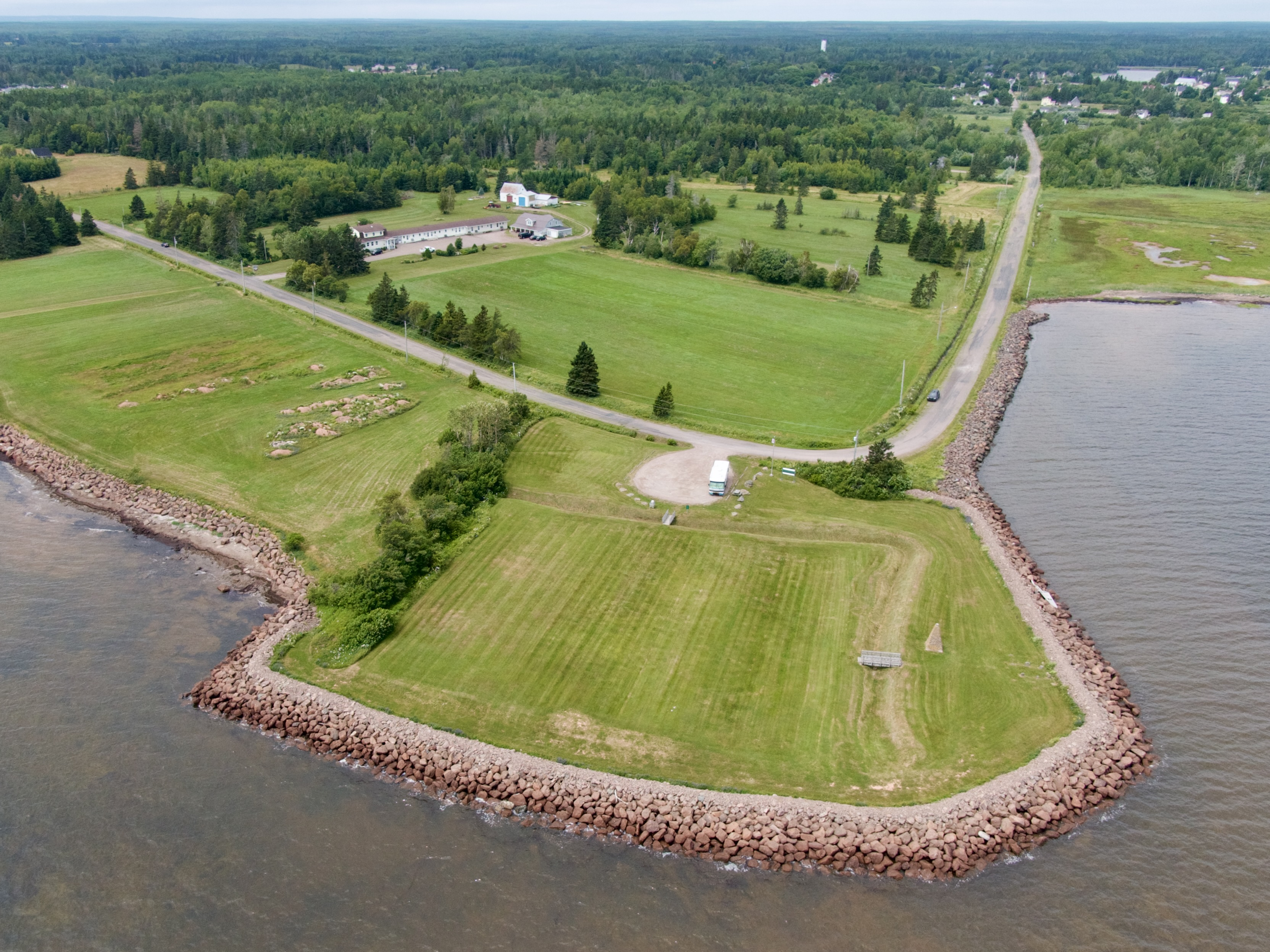
- Site of Fort Gaspareaux in 2025

Site information
- Type: Fort
- Controlled by: France (1751–1755), Great Britain (1755–1756)

National Historic Site of Canada
- Official name: Fort Gaspareaux National Historic Site of Canada
- Designated: 1920

Site history
- Built: 1751
- In use: 1751-1756

Fort Gaspareaux (later Fort Monckton) was a French fort at the head of Baie Verte near the mouth of the Gaspareaux River and just southeast of the modern community of Port Elgin, New Brunswick, Canada, on the Isthmus of Chignecto. It was built during Father Le Loutre's War and is now a National Historic Site of Canada overlooking the Northumberland Strait.

== Father Le Loutre's War ==
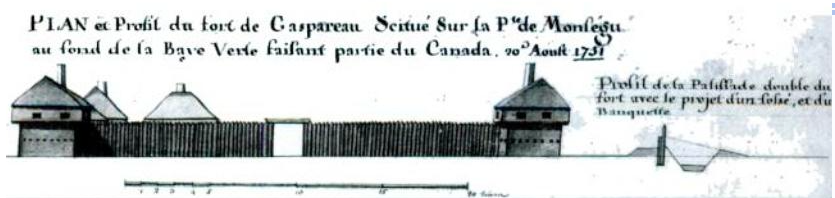
Fort Gaspereaux, 1751

Despite the British Conquest of Acadia in 1710, Nova Scotia remained primarily occupied by Catholic Acadians and Mi'kmaq. Father Le Loutre's War began when Edward Cornwallis arrived to establish Halifax with 13 transports on June 21, 1749. The British quickly began to build other settlements. To guard against Mi'kmaq, Acadian and French attacks on the new Protestant settlements, British fortifications were erected in Halifax (1749), Dartmouth (1750), Bedford (Fort Sackville) (1751), Lunenburg (1753) and Lawrencetown (1754).

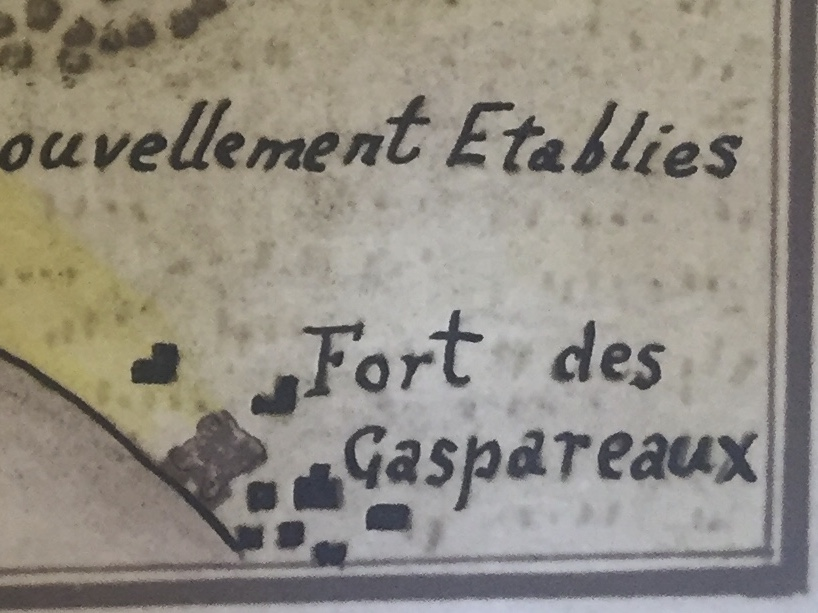
Copy of French Map, c. 1753 by Louis Franquet, (inset) Nova Scotia Archives

Within 18 months of establishing Halifax, the British also took firm control of peninsula Nova Scotia by building fortifications in all the major Acadian communities: present-day Windsor (Fort Edward); Grand Pre (Fort Vieux Logis) and Chignecto (Fort Lawrence). (A British fort already existed at the other major Acadian centre of Annapolis Royal, Nova Scotia. Cobequid remained without a fort.)

The only land route between Louisbourg and Quebec went from Baie Verte through Chignecto, along the Bay of Fundy and up the Saint John River. With the establishment of Halifax, the French recognized at once the threat it represented and that the Saint John River corridor might be used to attack Quebec City itself. To protect this vital gateway, at the beginning of 1749, the French strategically constructed three forts within 18 months along the route: one at Baie Verte (Fort Gaspareaux), one at Chignecto (Fort Beauséjour) and another at the mouth of the Saint John River (Fort Menagoueche).

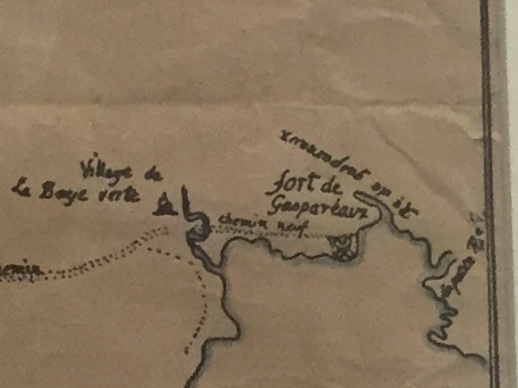
Copy of French Map, c. 1752. (inset) Nova Scotia Archives

Effectively a fortified warehouse manned by a small garrison, it was built in 1751 by the order of the Marquis de la Jonquière as a way station between Fort Beauséjour and Louisbourg and Québec. It was originally a palisaded earthwork, measuring 180 feet (60 metres) square and surrounded by a ditch. At each corner was a blockhouse equipped with small bore cannon. By 1753, there was never more than 12 or 14 soldiers stationed at the fort at the same time.

Communication with Fort Beauséjour across the Isthmus of Chignecto was at first via an ancient portage route, but, in 1754, a road was built linking the two forts. Communication by sea was possible in the summer to Québec, Louisbourg and France.

== Seven Years' War ==
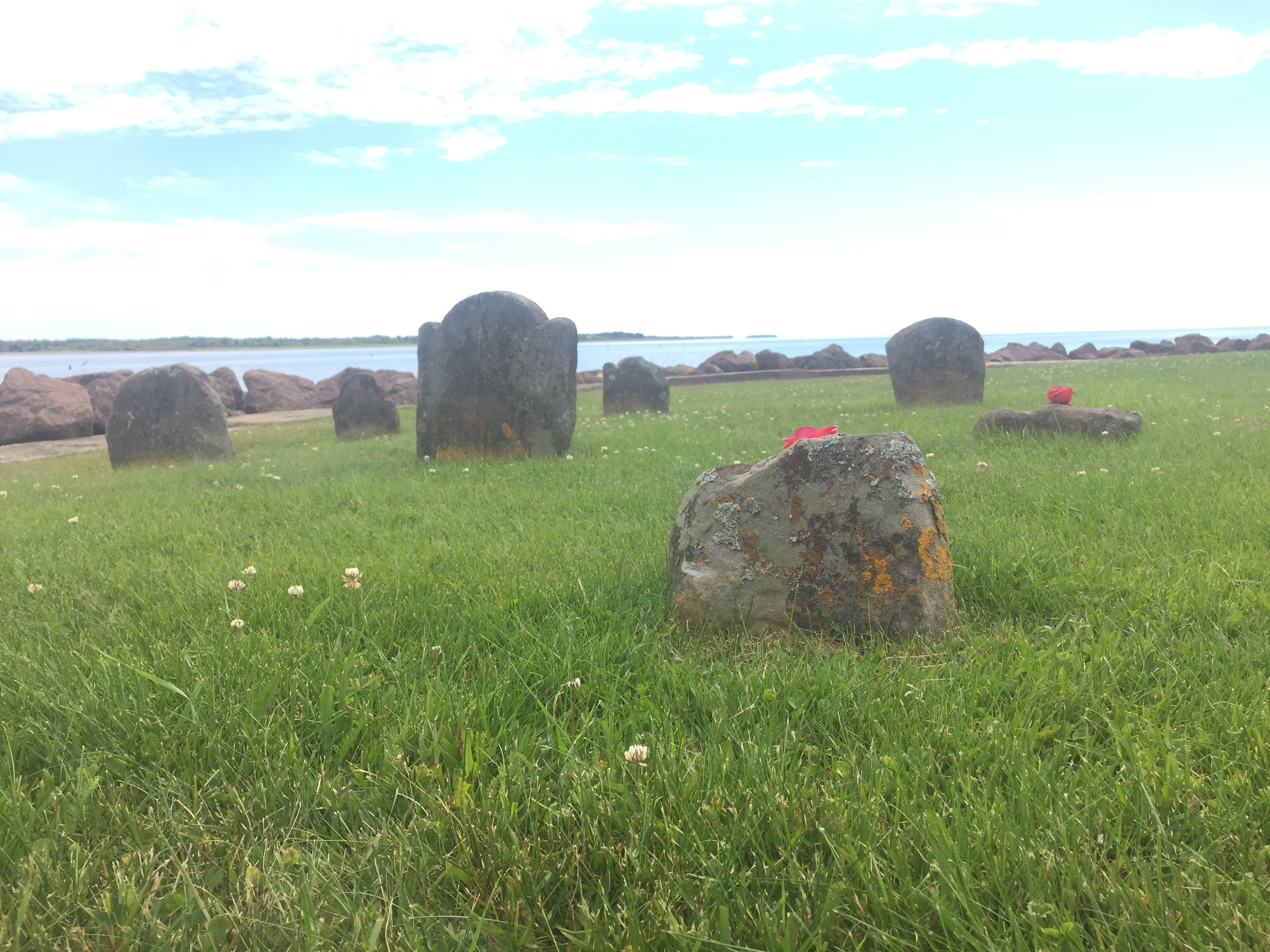
British Gravestones from the Mi'kmaw Raids (1755-1756) - oldest known military gravestones in Canada

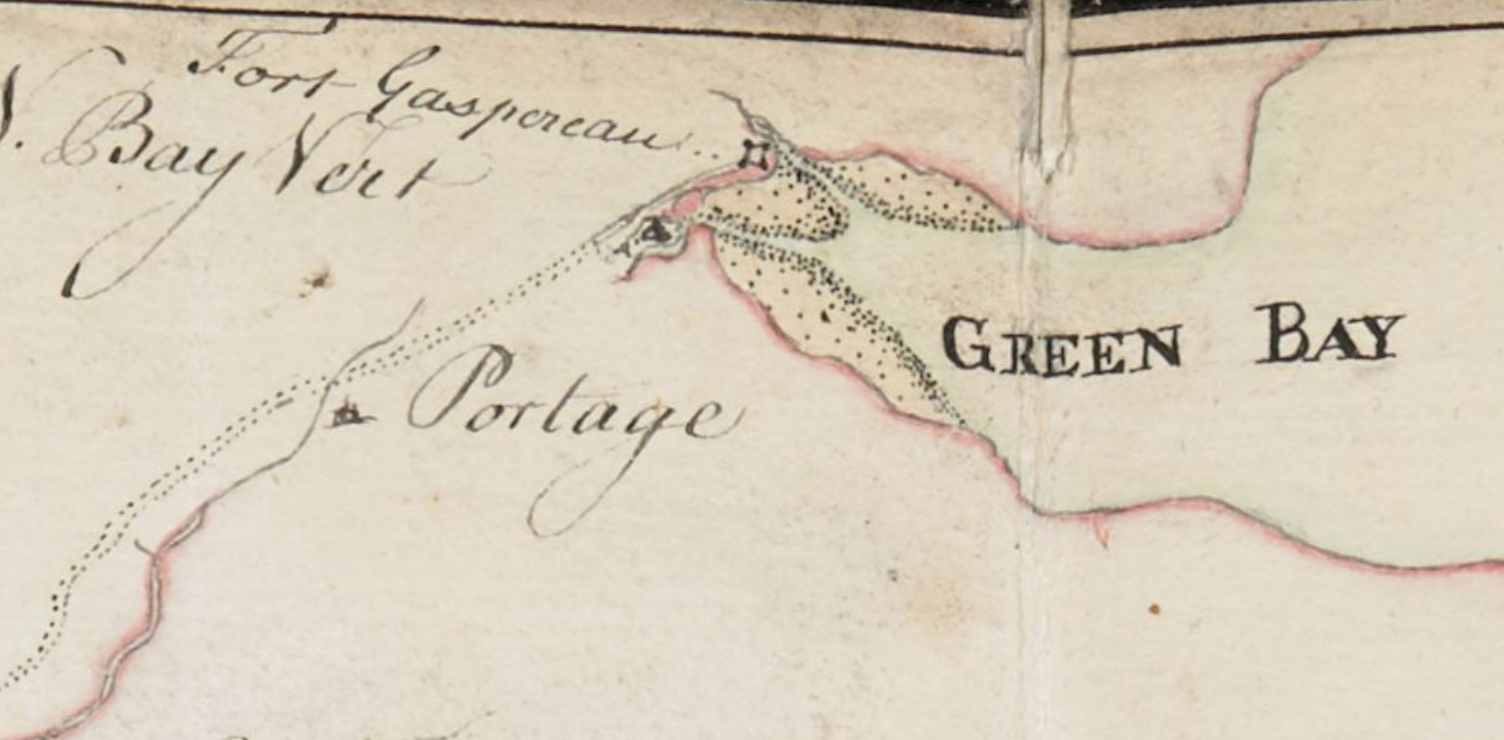
Fort Gaspereau by John Brewse (inset of A map of the surveyed parts of Nova Scotia, 1756)

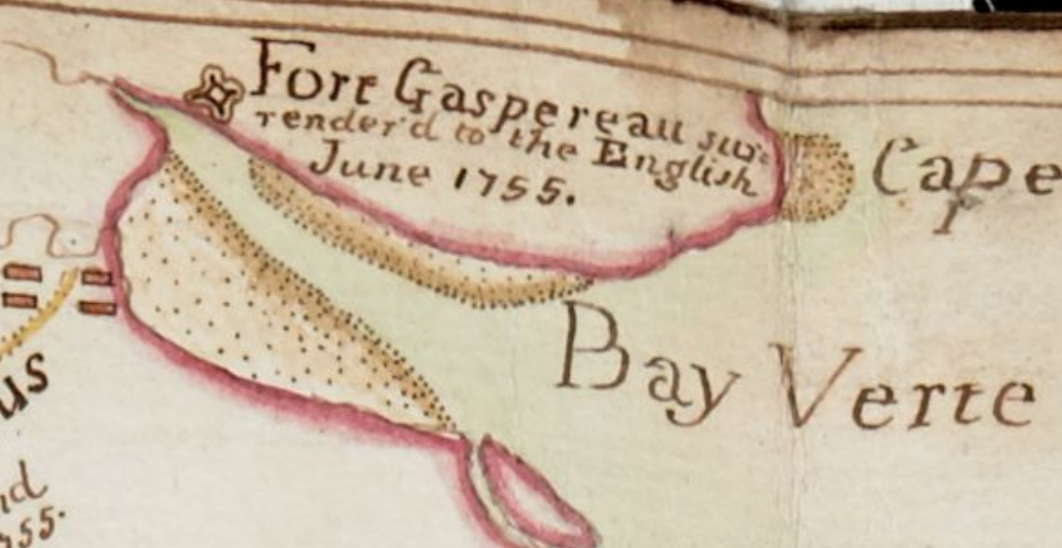
Fort Gaspereau by Charles Morris (inset of A chart of the sea coasts of the peninsula of Nova Scotia, 1755)

During the Seven Years' War (also known as the French and Indian War), immediately after the Battle of Fort Beauséjour in 1755, the British sent 300 men, led by Colonel John Winslow, to take Fort Gaspareaux, then under the command of Captain Villeray. This was quickly accomplished, and the fort was renamed Fort Monckton (after colonial administrator Robert Monckton) and put under the charge of an English garrison. In the spring of 1756, Mi’kmaw militia ambushed a wood gathering party from Fort Monckton (former Fort Gaspareaux), and scalped nine of them. These soldiers' remains are in a small military graveyard at the fort. The British abandoned the fort later in the same year.

== Commanders ==
- Benjamin Rouer de Villeray
- Thomas Cobb (military officer)
- Joseph Frye

== National Historic Site ==
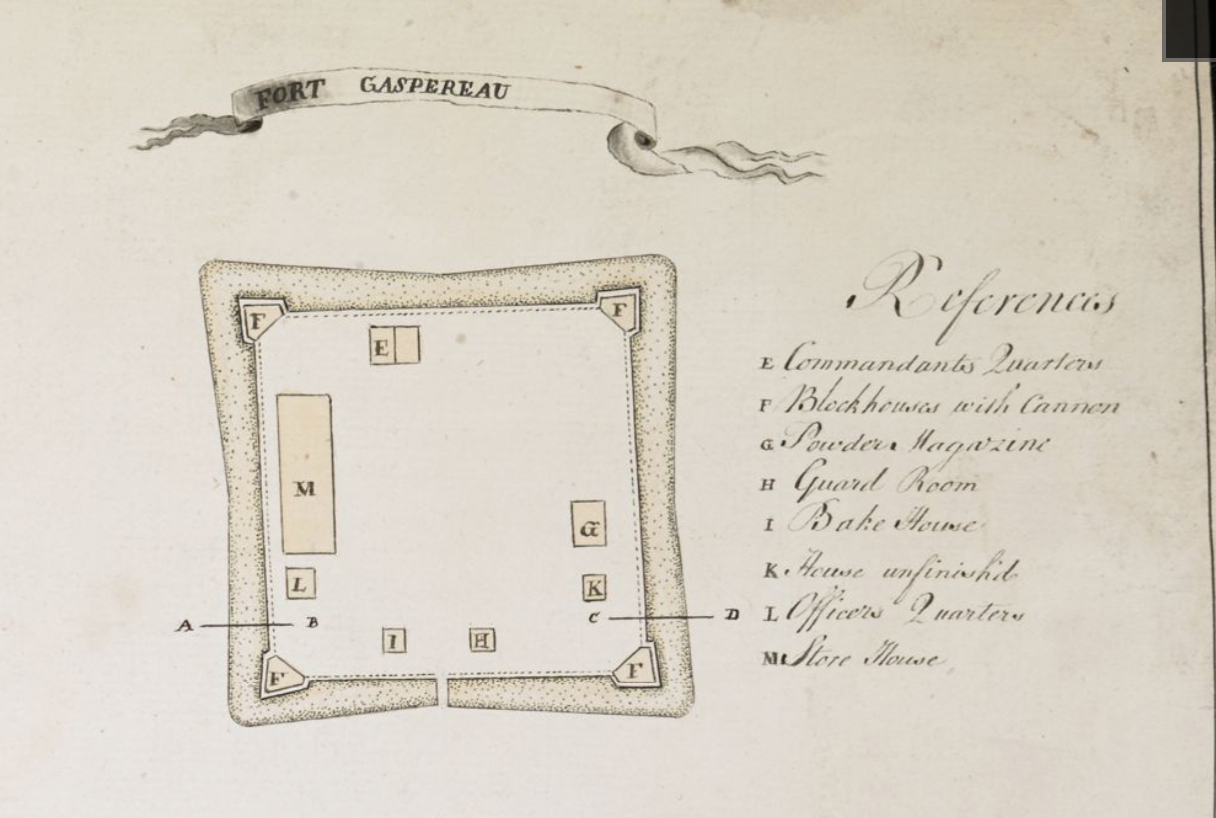
Fort Gaspereau by John Brewse (inset of A map of the surveyed parts of Nova Scotia, 1756)

A stone cairn was erected by the National Historic Sites and Monuments Board in the 1930s to commemorate the fort. The site today consists of a ditched enclosure. Palisaded grounds once surrounded the grounds on the inside of the ditch. There is a small cemetery - the headstones are now illegible. An unmanned light structure was erected in 1972.

== Affiliations ==
The Museum is affiliated with: CMA, CHIN, and Virtual Museum of Canada.

== See also ==
- List of French forts in North America
- Military history of Nova Scotia
