= Port Elgin =

Port Elgin may refer to:

- Port Elgin, New Brunswick, Canada
- Port Elgin, Ontario, Canada
