= New Brunswick Route 16 =

Highway in New Brunswick

Route 16
- Route Transcanadienne
- Trans-Canada Highway
- Route 16 highlighted in red.

Route information
- Maintained by New Brunswick Department of Transportation
- Length: 52 km (32 mi)
- Existed: 1920s–present

Major junctions
- West end: Route 2 (TCH) in Tantramar
- Route 15 / Route 970 in Strait Shores
- East end: Route 1 (TCH) on the Confederation Bridge at the P.E.I. border

Location
- Country: Canada
- Province: New Brunswick

Highway system
- Trans-Canada Highway; Provincial highways in New Brunswick; Former routes
← Route 15	→ Route 17

Route 16 is a two-lane highway in the Canadian province of New Brunswick. The 52-kilometre (32 mi) route begins at Route 2 in Tantramar and ends at the midpoint of the Confederation Bridge, where it becomes Prince Edward Island Route 1.

It functions as a secondary leg of the Trans-Canada Highway to connect Prince Edward Island with the mainline Trans-Canada Highway Route 2 in Tantramar.

Route 16 is the last section of the Trans-Canada in New Brunswick that is not four lanes wide, with no plans in the near future to be widened, as the Confederation Bridge is also only two lanes.

== Route description ==
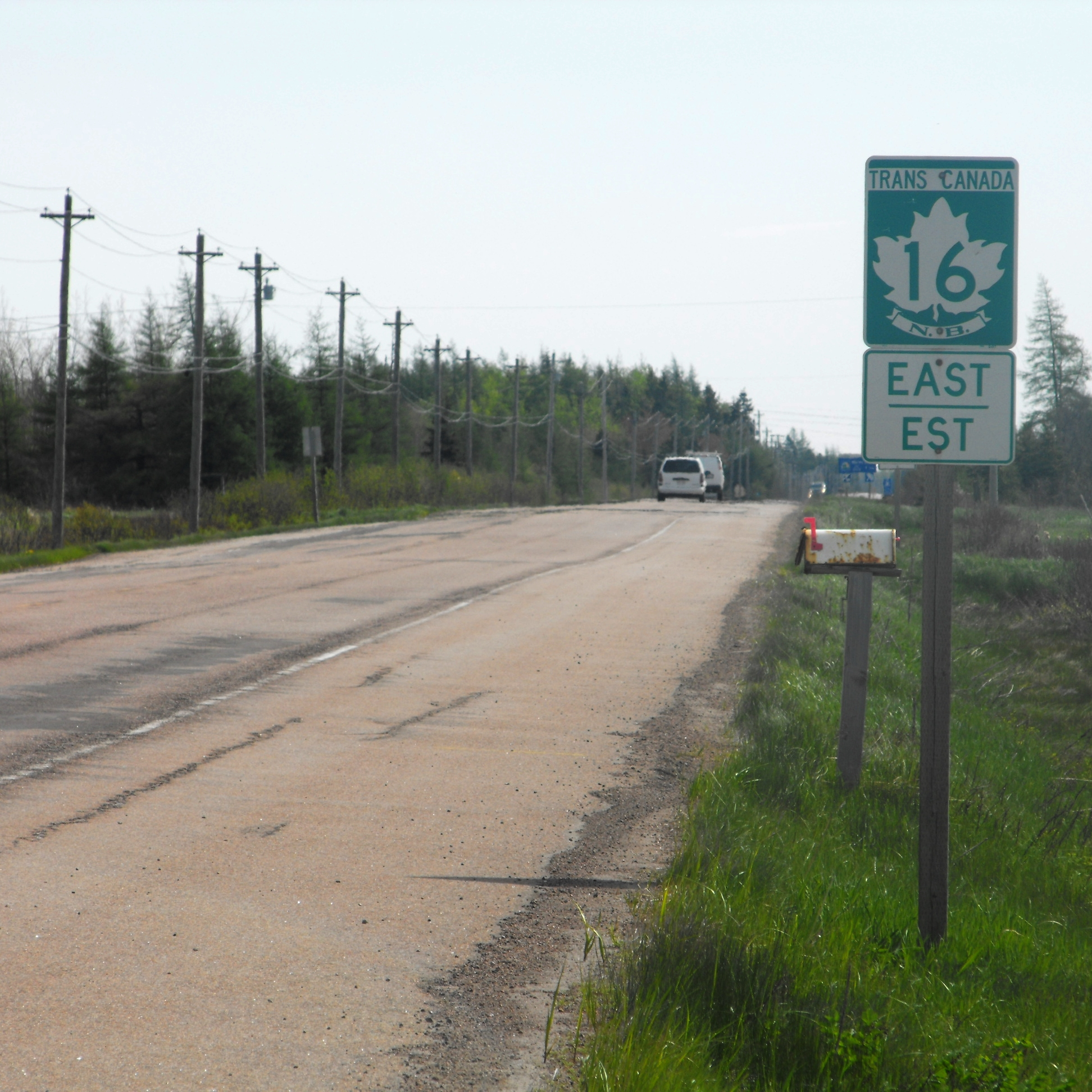
NB Route 16

Route 16 begins in Tantramar near Aulac at a cloverleaf interchange, one of only three grade-separated interchanges on the entire route. Route 16 used to continue an additional 300 m (980 ft) to Aulac Road, the original alignment of Route 2, but was adjusted when a 4-lane alignment opened in the early 1990s.

Route 16 continues east from Aulac as an uncontrolled access 2-lane highway passing through the following communities in rural Westmorland County while paralleling the New Brunswick-Nova Scotia inter-provincial border: Point de Bute, Upper Point de Bute, Jolicure, Halls Hill, and Baie Verte Road.

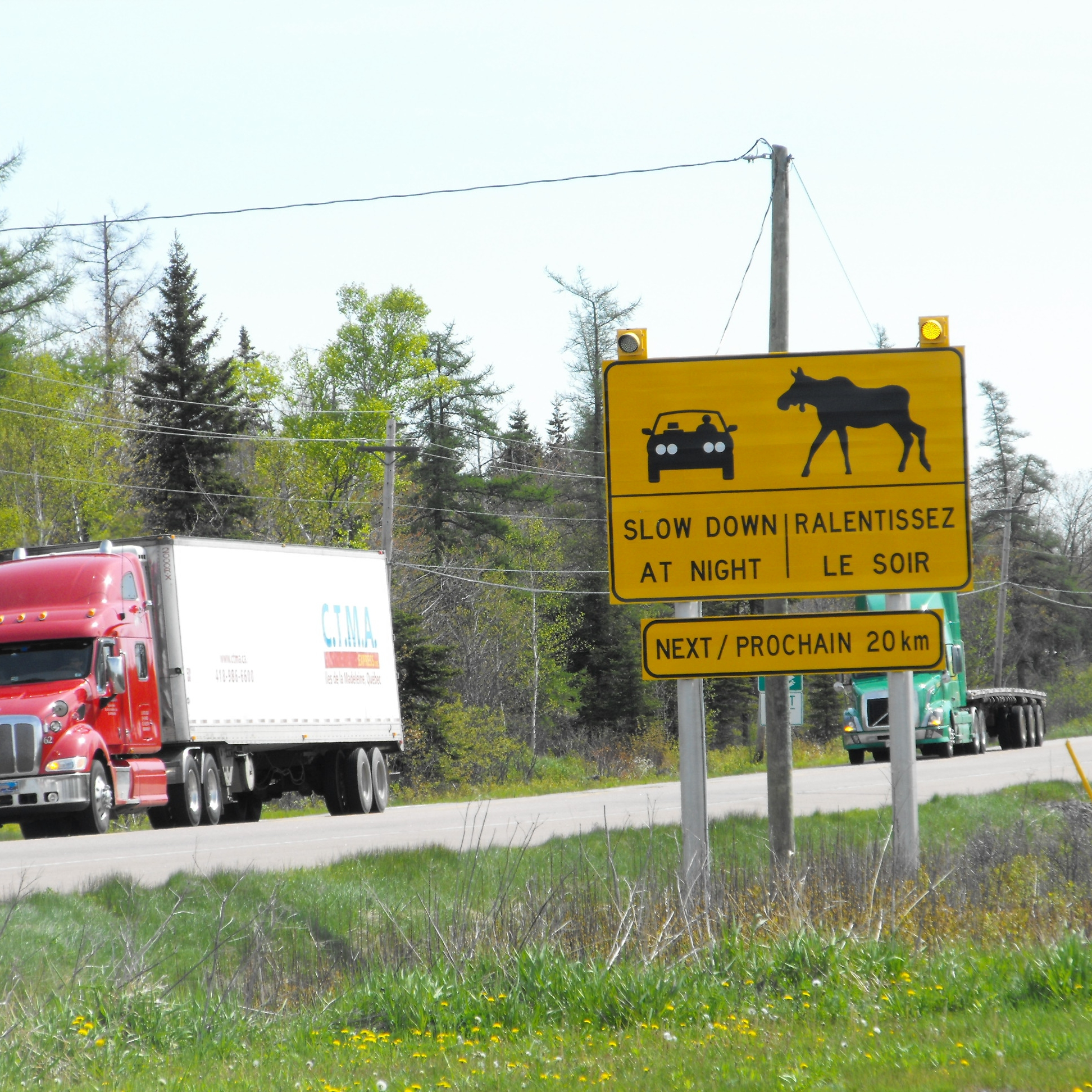
Moose warning sign

The first major intersection on Route 16 east of Aulac is a T intersection with Main Street just west of the community of Baie Verte. Main Street is a former alignment of Route 16 and connects with Route 970 in the community of Baie Verte; this alignment was bypassed during a 7-kilometre (4.3 mi) realignment of Route 16 around Baie Verte and Strait Shores in the 1960s.

Route 16 continues east on this bypass alignment through Coburg before entering Strait Shores where it interchanges directly with Route 970 and the eastern terminus of Route 15 in a roundabout interchange called the Port Elgin Rotary. The 1960s bypass reconnects with the original alignment of Route 16 at a T intersection with East Main Street on the east side of Strait Shores.

Route 16 continues east from Strait Shores as an uncontrolled access 2-lane highway passing through the following communities on the Cape Tormentine peninsula: Timber River (where it intersects Route 960), Hardy, Melrose, and Malden.

At Malden the highway intersects with Immigrant Road in a T intersection. Immigrant Road serves Bayfield and Cape Tormentine and is the original 6-kilometre (3.7 mi) alignment of Route 16 from Malden to Cape Tormentine before the Confederation Bridge opened on May 31, 1997.

From Malden to the eastern terminus at the abutment of the Confederation Bridge in Cape Jourimain, Route 16 is a controlled access 2-lane highway running on a 7-kilometre (4.3 mi) alignment that opened in 1997. It intersects Route 955 in a grade-separated diamond interchange approximately 1.5 km (0.93 mi) west of Bayfield.

The final interchange on Route 16 is also grade separated and provides access to the Cape Jourimain Nature Centre approximately 0.6 km (0.37 mi) west of the Confederation Bridge. Traffic leaves Route 16 when entering the Confederation Bridge to cross the Northumberland Strait to Prince Edward Island before continuing on Trans-Canada Highway Route 1.

Port Elgin, in the community of Strait Shores, is the only major village along the route.

== History ==
This highway has been part of the New Brunswick highway network since the Canadian National Railways ferry service from Cape Tormentine NB to Borden PEI began accepting automobiles in the 1920s.

The original section from Aulac to Baie Verte was known as the Baie Verte Road, the section through Baie Verte and Strait Shores was known as Main Street, the section from Strait Shores to Bayfield was known as the Immigrant Road, and the section from Bayfield to Cape Tormentine (now part of Route 955) was known as the Bayfield Road. The Trans-Canada Highway and Route 16 designation was applied in the 1960s after the Bayfield and Baie Verte/Strait Shores realignments.

There have been three major realignments to the route:

- A 7-kilometre (4.3 mi) bypass of Baie Verte and Strait Shores along with the Port Elgin Rotary, constructed in the 1960s as part of the Trans Canada Highway upgrades.
- A 4-kilometre (2.5 mi) bypass of Bayfield between Malden and Cape Tormentine constructed in the 1960s as part of the Trans Canada Highway upgrades.
- A 7-kilometre (4.3 mi) realignment between Malden and Cape Jourimain constructed in 1997 as part of the Confederation Bridge project. This saw the eastern terminus of the highway shifted from the Marine Atlantic ferry terminal in Cape Tormentine to the present eastern terminus at the bridge abutment in Cape Jourimain. This section was partially completed in the 1960s as part of a proposal at the time to construct a bridge-tunnel-causeway between Cape Jourimain and Borden. However, the project was cancelled in the late 1960s. The road bed and rail track bed from Malden to the water's edge in Cape Jourimain, and overpass at route 955 were constructed and lay abandoned from the late 1960s to the mid 1990s when the road section was subsequently completed for the Confederation Bridge project. The partially-completed rail bed dating from the 1960s still exists and is now used for recreational trails at the Cape Jourimain Nature Centre.

== Major intersections ==
County	Location	km	mi	Exit	Destinations	Notes
Westmorland	Tantramar	−0.3	−0.19		Aulac Road – Aulac, Fort Beauséjour	
Westmorland	Tantramar	0.0	0.0	—	Route 2 (TCH) – Nova Scotia, Sackville, Moncton	Western terminus; Cloverleaf interchange; Route 2 exit 513
Westmorland	Strait Shores	19.8	12.3		To Route 970 – Baie Verte	
Westmorland	Strait Shores	25.6	15.9	25	Route 15 west – Shediac, Moncton; Route 970 south – Port Elgin, Baie Verte	Roundabout; Route 15 exit is unnumbered
Westmorland	Strait Shores	29.4	18.3		Route 960 east – Upper Cape	
Westmorland	Strait Shores	47.7	29.6	47	Route 955 – Cape Tormentine, Murray Corner	Interchange
Westmorland	Strait Shores	51.2	31.8	51	Cape Jourimain	Interchange
Northumberland Strait (Abegweit Passage)		51.6– 59.1	32.1– 36.7	Confederation Bridge (toll leaving PEI)		
Northumberland Strait (Abegweit Passage)		51.6– 59.1	32.1– 36.7	—	Route 1 (TCH) – Borden-Carleton, Charlottetown	Continuation into Prince Edward Island
1.000 mi = 1.609 km; 1.000 km = 0.621 mi: Closed/former; Tolled

Trans-Canada Highway
Previous route Route 2	Route 16	Next route PE Route 1
