= New Brunswick Route 960 =

Highway in New Brunswick, Canada

Route 960

Route information
- Maintained by New Brunswick Department of Transportation
- Length: 26.0 km (16.2 mi)

Major junctions
- West end: Route 16 (TCH) in Timber River
- East end: Route 955 in Cape Tormentine

Location
- Country: Canada
- Province: New Brunswick
- Counties: Westmorland

Highway system
- Provincial highways in New Brunswick; Former routes
← Route 955	→ Route 970

Route 960 is a Canadian highway in Westmorland County, New Brunswick.

== Route description ==
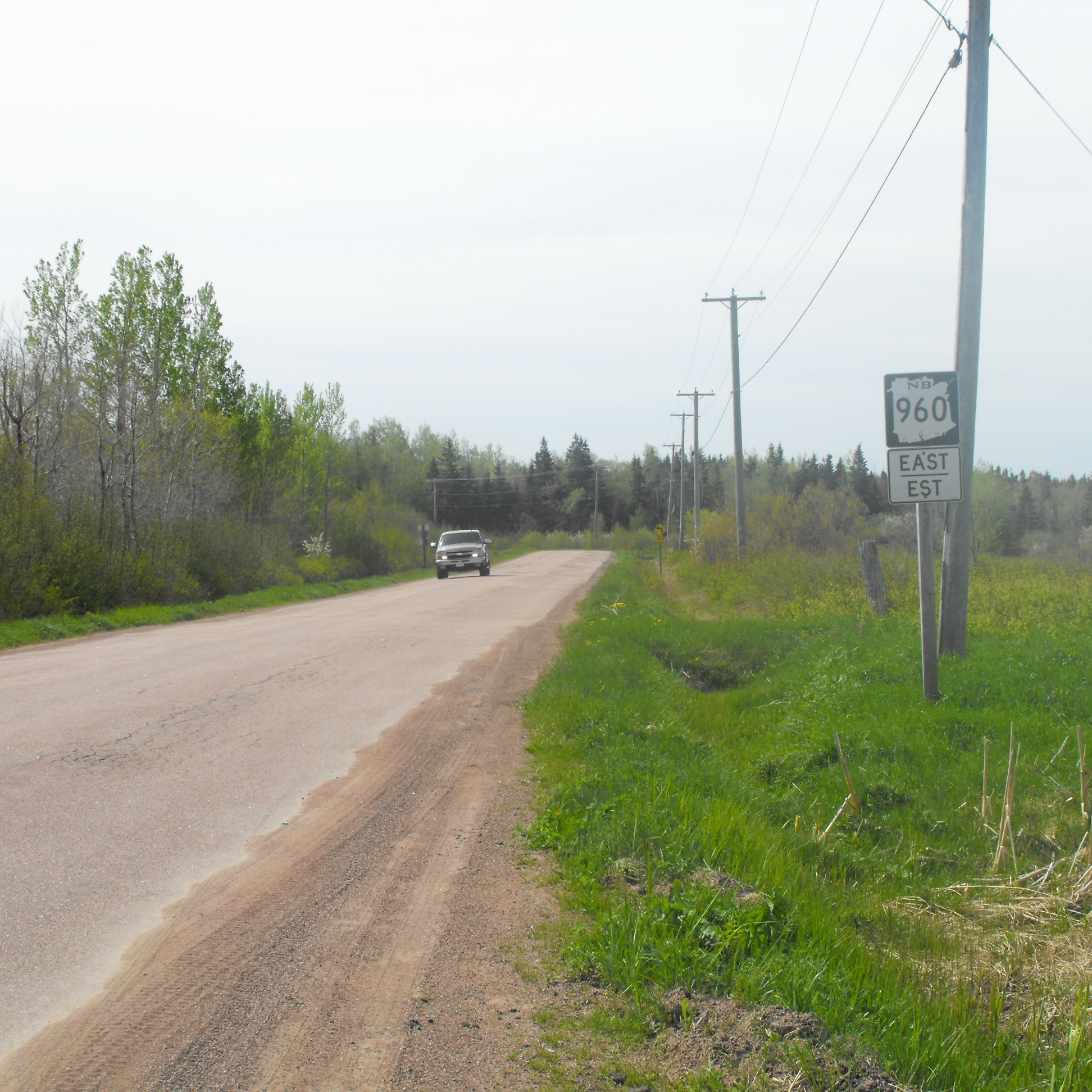
New Brunswick Route 960

The 26 kilometre road runs from an intersection with Route 16 at Timber River (near Strait Shores) to an intersection with the Immigrant Road (the former Route 16 alignment) in Cape Tormentine.

The road continues as Route 955.

Route 960 serves the communities of Bayside, Upper Cape, and Cape Spear as well as Cape Tormentine.

== See also ==
- List of New Brunswick provincial highways
