= Viv Allen =

Canadian ice hockey player

- Born: September 9, 1916 Bayfield, New Brunswick, Canada
- Died: August 15, 1995 (aged 78)
- Height: 5 ft 6 in (168 cm)
- Weight: 140 lb (64 kg; 10 st 0 lb)
- Position: Right wing
- Shot: Right
- Played for: New York Americans
- Playing career: 1936–1950

Vivan Mariner "Squee" Allen (September 9, 1916 – August 15, 1995) was a Canadian ice hockey right winger who played for several teams over a 12-year career. Allen played 11 games for the New York Americans of the National Hockey League during the 1940–41 season. He spent the rest of his career, which lasted from 1936 to 1950, in the minor leagues. Allan's brother, George, also played in the NHL. He was born in Bayfield, New Brunswick, but grew up in Kerrobert, Saskatchewan.

== Career statistics ==
=== Regular season and playoffs ===
			Regular season					Playoffs
Season	Team	League	GP	G	A	Pts	PIM	GP	G	A	Pts	PIM
1935–36	Kerrobert Tigers	SIHA	—	—	—	—	—	—	—	—	—	—
1936–37	North Battleford Beavers	N-SSHL	21	5	3	8	9	4	1	1	2	0
1936–37	North Battleford Beavers	Al-Cup	—	—	—	—	—	12	4	2	6	2
1937–38	Creighton Eagles	NOHA	15	4	6	10	16	4	0	1	1	4
1938–39	Lethbridge Maple Leafs	ASHL	16	9	6	15	20	17	8	4	12	24
1938–39	Lethbridge Maple Leafs	Al-Cup	—	—	—	—	—	3	0	0	0	2
1939–40	Rivervale Skeeters	EAHL	60	26	47	73	28	—	—	—	—	—
1940–41	New York Americans	NHL	11	0	1	1	0	—	—	—	—	—
1940–41	Springfield Indians	AHL	29	5	7	12	6	3	0	3	3	0
1941–42	Pittsburgh Hornets	AHL	51	20	30	50	10	—	—	—	—	—
1942–43	Pittsburgh Hornets	AHL	47	6	32	38	18	2	0	1	1	0
1942–43	Washington Lions	AHL	1	0	0	0	0	—	—	—	—	—
1943–44	Pittsburgh Hornets	AHL	12	4	0	4	5	—	—	—	—	—
1943–44	Saskatoon Quakers	SSHL	8	3	6	9	4	4	5	2	7	2
1943–44	Philadelphia Falcons	EAHL	4	2	1	3	2	—	—	—	—	—
1944–45	Cornwallis Navy	CSHL	7	1	2	3	2	—	—	—	—	—
1945–46	Pittsburgh Hornets	AHL	2	0	0	0	0	—	—	—	—	—
1945–46	Dallas Texans	USHL	34	21	17	38	10	—	—	—	—	—
1946–47	Dallas Texans	USHL	58	34	18	52	14	6	0	0	0	4
1947–48	Dallas Texans	USHL	61	16	27	43	19	—	—	—	—	—
1948–49	Dallas Texans	USHL	24	7	6	13	6	4	0	1	1	0
1949–50	Saskatoon Quakers	WCSHL	13	2	6	8	4	—	—	—	—	—
AHL totals			142	35	69	104	39	5	0	4	4	0
USHL totals			177	78	68	146	49	10	0	1	1	4
NHL totals			11	0	1	1	0	—	—	—	—	—
