= George Allen (ice hockey) =

Canadian ice hockey player

- Born: July 27, 1914 Bayfield, New Brunswick, Canada
- Died: March 27, 2000 (aged 85) Red Deer, Alberta, Canada
- Height: 5 ft 10 in (178 cm)
- Weight: 162 lb (73 kg; 11 st 8 lb)
- Position: Left wing
- Shot: Left
- Played for: New York Rangers; Chicago Black Hawks; Montreal Canadiens
- Playing career: 1938–1951

George Trenholm Allen (July 27, 1914 – March 27, 2000) was a Canadian professional ice hockey player who played Left wing in the National Hockey League, mostly for the Chicago Black Hawks, between 1938 and 1947. Allen was born in Bayfield, New Brunswick, but grew up in Kerrobert, Saskatchewan.

== Playing career ==
Allen began his career playing in various locations in the east, until he joined the North Battleford Beavers of the Northern Saskatchewan Senior Hockey League, with whom he went to the Allan Cup final in 1937, where they lost to the Sudbury Tigers. After playing four games with the Tigers himself the following year, Allen was then signed by the New York Rangers, and assigned to their New Haven Eagles farm team. Injuries to the Rangers forced them to call up Allen during the 1938–39 season, taking Lynn Patrick's place in the lineup, and he earned 12 points in 19 games. In his debut with the Rangers, he scored 3 points (two goals and an assist), setting a Rangers' mark for most points in his first game (later matched by Dominic Moore in 2003). After the season, his rights were then sold to the Black Hawks, on May 17, 1939.

With the Black Hawks, Allen became a regular everyday player, and was fifth in team scoring in his first season. His best season ranking-wise with Chicago was 1940-41, when he ranked second, and third in the playoffs. Allen's best season production-wise was 1943-44, when he scored 41 points, good for fifth on the team, and was third in playoff scoring, as Montreal swept Chicago in the Stanley Cup Final. Allen missed the 1944–45 NHL season due to the National War Labour Board restrictions on crossing the Canada–US border. He played one more year in Chicago, and ahead of the 1946-47 NHL season Allen was traded to the Montreal Canadiens, for Paul Bibeault, with both teams holding "right of recall". After the season, the players were returned to their original teams, but after a couple of seasons in the minors, Allen never played in the NHL again. Allen went on to spend one season as a playing-coach during the 1950–51 season with the Regina Capitals.

Allen's brother Viv played 6 games for the New York Americans in 1940, but as the Americans did not play Chicago in that span, the two brothers never had the chance to play against each other in the NHL. After their hockey careers, the two brothers went into farming together.

== Career statistics ==
=== Regular season and playoffs ===
			Regular season					Playoffs
Season	Team	League	GP	G	A	Pts	PIM	GP	G	A	Pts	PIM
1935–36	North Battleford Beavers	N-SSHL	21	10	5	15	10	3	2	1	3	4
1936–37	North Battleford Beavers	N-SSHL	26	15	9	24	26	4	4	1	5	4
1936–37	North Battleford Beavers	Al-Cup	—	—	—	—	—	12	6	4	10	8
1937–38	Sudbury Frood Tigers	NOHA	4	2	0	2	8	—	—	—	—	—
1937–38	New Haven Eagles	IAHL	35	9	13	22	20	2	0	0	0	0
1938–39	Philadelphia Ramblers	IAHL	33	23	11	34	15	3	1	0	1	0
1938–39	New York Rangers	NHL	19	6	6	12	10	7	0	0	0	4
1939–40	Chicago Black Hawks	NHL	48	10	12	22	26	2	0	0	0	0
1940–41	Chicago Black Hawks	NHL	44	14	17	31	22	5	2	2	4	10
1941–42	Chicago Black Hawks	NHL	43	7	13	20	31	3	1	1	2	0
1942–43	Chicago Black Hawks	NHL	47	10	14	24	26	—	—	—	—	—
1943–44	Chicago Black Hawks	NHL	45	17	24	41	36	9	5	4	9	8
1945–46	Chicago Black Hawks	NHL	44	11	15	26	16	4	0	0	0	4
1946–47	Montreal Canadiens	NHL	49	7	14	21	12	11	1	3	4	6
1946–47	Buffalo Bisons	AHL	3	1	1	2	4	—	—	—	—	—
1947–48	Cleveland Barons	AHL	68	15	34	49	30	9	2	5	7	6
1948–49	Cleveland Barons	AHL	28	2	3	5	26	—	—	—	—	—
1948–49	Minneapolis Millers	USHL	37	7	6	13	6	—	—	—	—	—
1950–51	Regina Capitals	WCSHL	50	9	18	27	26	—	—	—	—	—
NHL totals			340	82	115	197	181	41	9	10	19	32
AHL totals			99	18	38	56	60	9	2	5	7	6

== Coaching statistics ==
				Regular season				Playoffs
Season	Team	League	Type	GC	W	L	T
1950–51	Regina Capitals	WCSHL	Player-Head	59	14	44	1
