= Port Elgin, New Brunswick =

Port Elgin
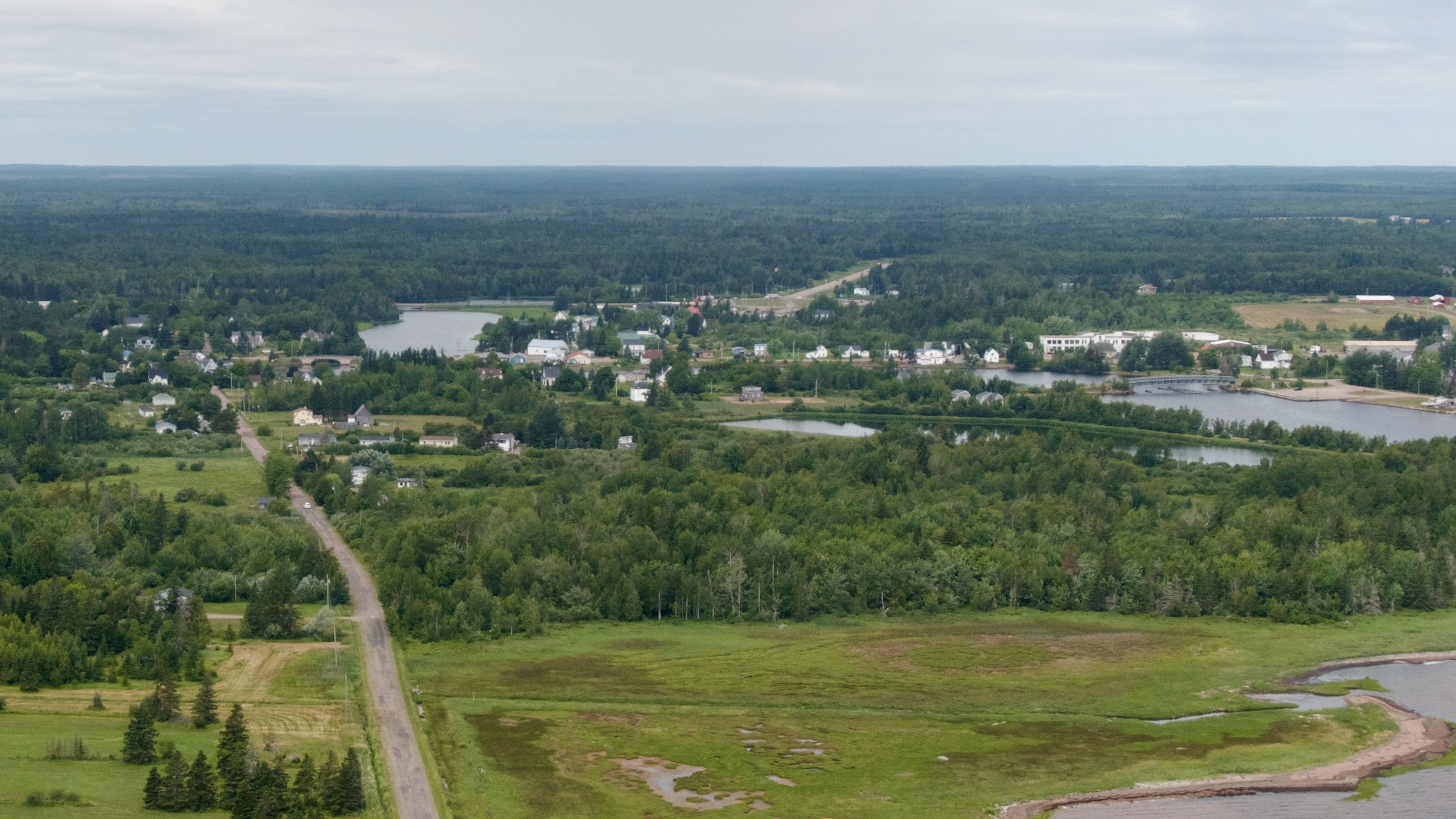
- Port Elgin in 2025
- Motto: "Your Port of Call"
- Location of Port Elgin within New Brunswick.
- Coordinates: 46°04′59″N 64°09′29″W
- Country: Canada
- Province: New Brunswick
- County: Westmorland
- Municipality: Strait Shores

Government
  - MP: Dominic LeBlanc
  - MLA: Bernard LeBlanc

Area
  - Land: 2.65 km^{2} (1.02 sq mi)
- Elevation: 1.5 m (5 ft)
- Highest elevation: 4.3 m (14 ft)
- Lowest elevation: 0 m (0 ft)

Population (2021)
  - Total: 381
  - Density: 144/km^{2} (370/sq mi)
  - Change (2016–21): ▼6.6%
- Demonym: Portelginian
- Time zone: UTC-4 (AST)
  - Summer (DST): UTC-3 (ADT)
- Postal code(s): E4M
- Area code: 506
- Access Routes: Route 16 (TCH); Route 15; Route 970
- Dwellings: 196
- Website: www.villageofportelgin.com

Port Elgin is a formerly incorporated village in Westmorland County, New Brunswick, Canada. It is located near the Nova Scotia border at the mouth of the Gaspereaux River where it empties into the Northumberland Strait's Baie Verte. It is the government centre of the Strait Shores district, which is a rural community type of local government.

== History ==
The village was founded by Acadians in 1690, but abandoned after the Expulsion of the Acadians in 1755. The earthworks of Fort Gaspareaux, a French military fortification from the Seven Years' War are located at the mouth of the river immediately east of the village.

Following the Seven Years' War and the American Revolutionary War, British Loyalists resettled in the area which was named Gaspareaux Town. Gaspareaux Town was renamed Port Elgin in 1847 in honour of Lord Elgin. The community was incorporated as a village in 1922, the first community in the province to do so.

Throughout the 19th century and first half of the 20th century, Port Elgin experienced modest industrialization with a handful of small factories, tanneries, and sawmills. The village also saw some shipping activity with several wharves on a sheltered harbour at the mouth of the Gaspereau River. The New Brunswick and Prince Edward Island Railway was built through the village in the early 1880s, opening on September 9, 1886, to connect the Intercolonial Railway at Sackville with the seasonal port of Cape Tormentine which supported the winter iceboat service to Prince Edward Island; in 1917 this port became a terminal for the year-round ferry service to P.E.I.

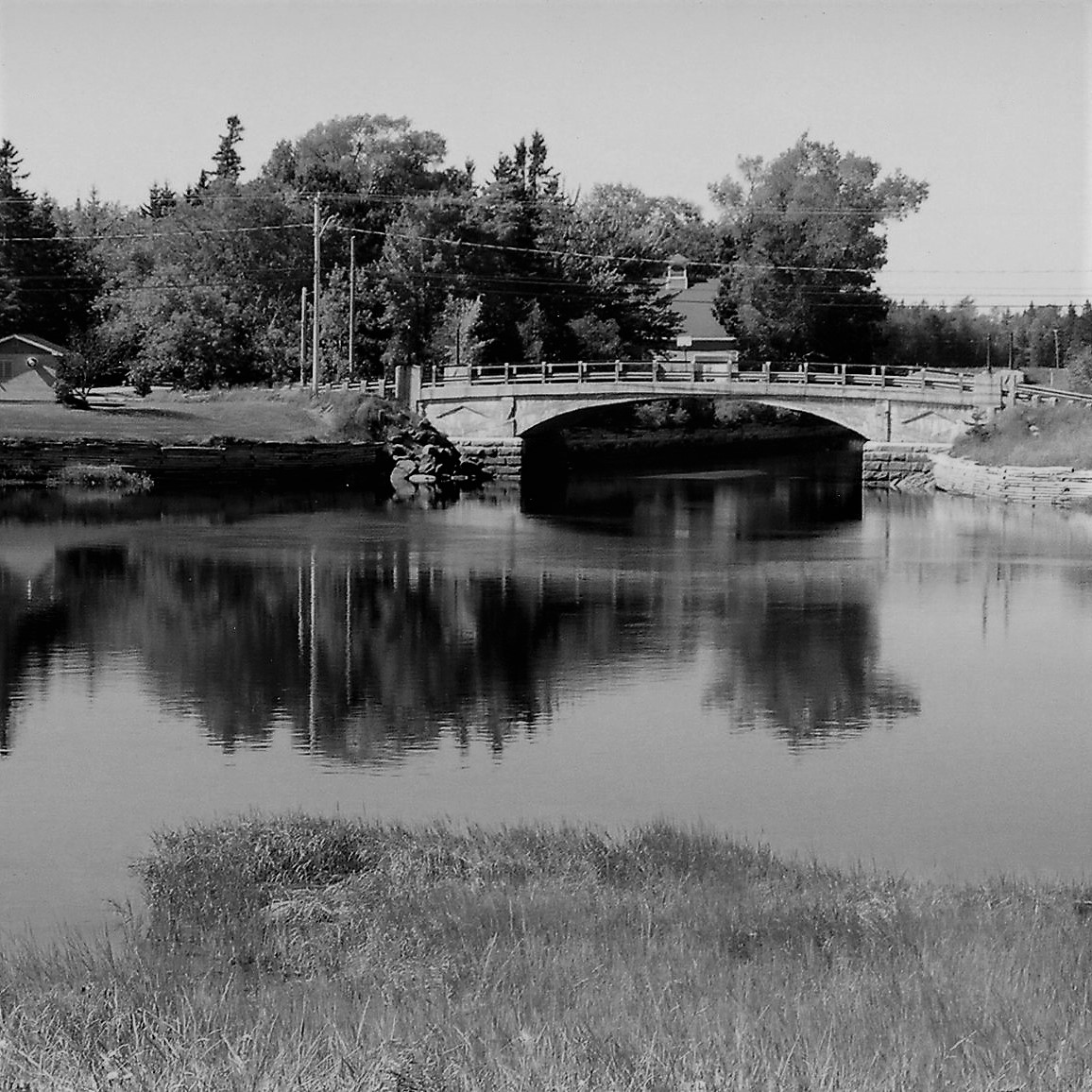
Bridge across the Gaspereau River in Port Elgin, New Brunswick

Automobile traffic increased through the village in the 1920s after the P.E.I. ferries began to carry road vehicles. The Baie Verte Road ran west of the village through Baie Verte as "Main Street" and the Immigrant Road ran east of the village. In the 1960s a bypass for Route 16 as a result of Trans-Canada Highway project funding was constructed around Baie Verte and Port Elgin; a traffic circle called the "Port Elgin Rotary" was built at the intersection between Route 16 and Route 15 and Route 970.

The largest employer in the village is Atlantic Windows, which employs 200 persons year-round. The second largest employer is Westford Nursing Home, which has about 30 full and part-time staff and provides permanent care facility for 29 persons as well as one relief-care bed.

The village has a single school, Port Elgin Regional School, which provides public schooling for grades K-8; this school district encompasses all surrounding areas running as far east as Cape Tormentine, north to Robichaud and west to Jolicure. The village also had its own high school but this was closed in the 1990s and high school students are now bused to Tantramar Regional High School in Sackville.

On 1 January 2023, the Village of Port Elgin, Baie Verte, Bayfield, Cape Tormentine, and parts of Botsford and Westmorland local service districts, were incorporated to form the rural community of Strait Shores. The community's name remains in official use.

=== 2010 coastal flooding ===
On January 2, 2010, the village experienced coastal flooding as a result of a storm surge from a nor'easter lifted cottages off their foundations and led to considerable damage to homes, forcing the declaration of a state of emergency in the village and surrounding area. The damage incurred by this storm is thought to be in the area of $900,000.

A second coastal flooding event occurred on December 21, 2010, when another storm surge from a nor'easter flooded sections of the village and surrounding area.

== Demographics ==
Population trend
Year	Pop.	±% p.a.
1981	504	—
1986	470	−1.39%
1991	490	+0.84%
1996	445	−1.91%
2001	436	−0.41%
2006	451	+0.68%
2011	418	−1.51%
2016	408	−0.48%
2021	381	−1.36%

In the 2021 Census of Population conducted by Statistics Canada, Port Elgin census subdivision (which corresponds with the former municipality) had a population of 381 living in 161 of its 170 total private dwellings, a change of −6.6% from its 2016 population of 408. With a land area of 2.65 km^{2} (1.02 sq mi), it had a population density of 143.8/km^{2} (372.4/sq mi) in 2021.

Income (2015)
Income type	By CAD
Total income per capita	$23,968
Median Household Income	$40,064
Median Family Income	$50,048

Mother tongue (2016)
Language	Population	Pct (%)
English	345	90.8%
French	25	6.6%
English and French	5	1.3%
Other languages	5	1.3%

== See also ==
- List of communities in New Brunswick
