= Murray Corner, New Brunswick =

Community in New Brunswick, Canada

Coordinates: 46.1720479°N 63.973633°W

Murray Corner is a community in the Canadian province of New Brunswick in Westmorland County on Route 955.

Murray Corner is on the Northumberland Strait; its main sources of recreation are boating, snowmobiling, horseback riding and other outdoor activities. Murray Corner is also the home of the Murray Beach Provincial Park.

The former local service district took its name from the community.

== History ==
Located 1.85 km (1.15 mi) north of Murray Road, on the road to Bayfield: Botsford Parish, Westmorland County: David Murray, Joseph Murray, Andrew Murray and John Murray, originally from Scotland, settled here about 1822: PO 1853–1913 with Pinquey Murray as the first postmaster: in 1866 Murray Corner was a farming and fishing settlement with about 22 families: in 1871 it had a population of 200: in 1898 Murray Corner had one store, two lobster factories, one church and a population of 150.

== Demographics ==
In the 2021 Census of Population conducted by Statistics Canada, Murray Corner had a population of 371 living in 188 of its 443 total private dwellings, a change of 0.8% from its 2016 population of 368. With a land area of 87.9 km^{2} (33.9 sq mi), it had a population density of 4.2/km^{2} (10.9/sq mi) in 2021.

== See also ==
- List of communities in New Brunswick
