= Bayfield, New Brunswick =

Local district in New Brunswick, Canada

Coordinates: 46.1378°N 63.8168°W

Bayfield was a local service district in Westmorland County, New Brunswick, Canada, near the intersection of Route 955 and Route 16. It is now part of the incorporated rural community of Strait Shores.

== History ==
Bayfield was named for Admiral Henry Wolsey Bayfield, who surveyed the coastlines of the Maritimes in the 1840s and 1850s. A post office was established in Bayfield in 1866. The community had a population of 175 in 1871, 200 in 1898, and 300 in 1904.

== Demographics ==
In the 2021 Census of Population conducted by Statistics Canada, Bayfield had a population of 42 living in 21 of its 23 total private dwellings, a change of 23.5% from its 2016 population of 34. With a land area of 1.42 km^{2} (0.55 sq mi), it had a population density of 29.6/km^{2} (76.6/sq mi) in 2021.

== Notable people ==
- George Allen - Hockey Player
- Jim Riley - Hockey Player
- Viv Allen - Hockey Player

== See also ==
- List of communities in New Brunswick
