= John Brewse =

British military engineer

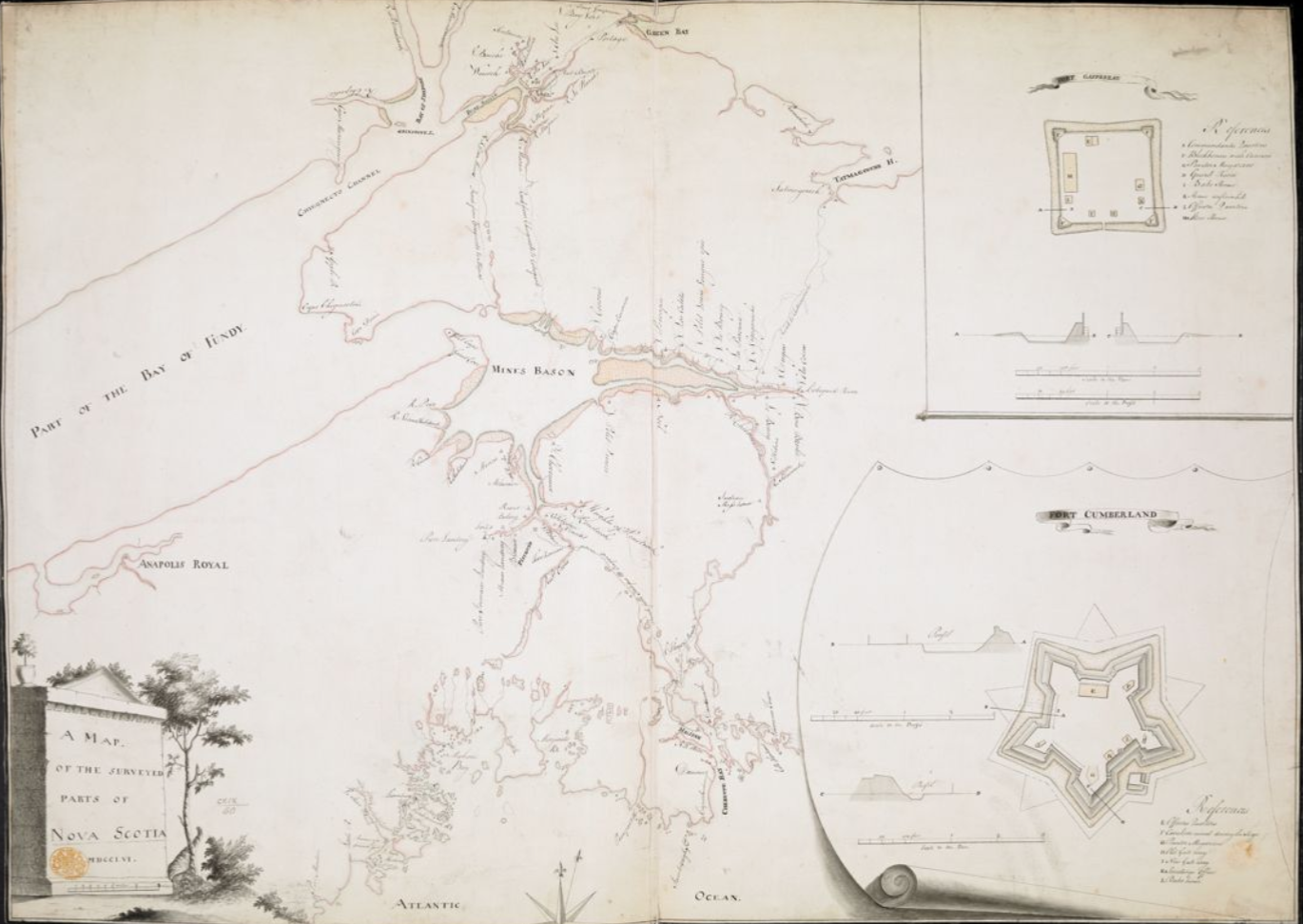
A map of surveyed parts of Nova Scotia, 1756 by John Brewse

John Brewse (Bruce) was a British military engineer who created the first surveys of Halifax, Nova Scotia (1749). He was largely responsible for fortifying the town against native and Acadian attacks. He also was wounded in the Battle at Chignecto.

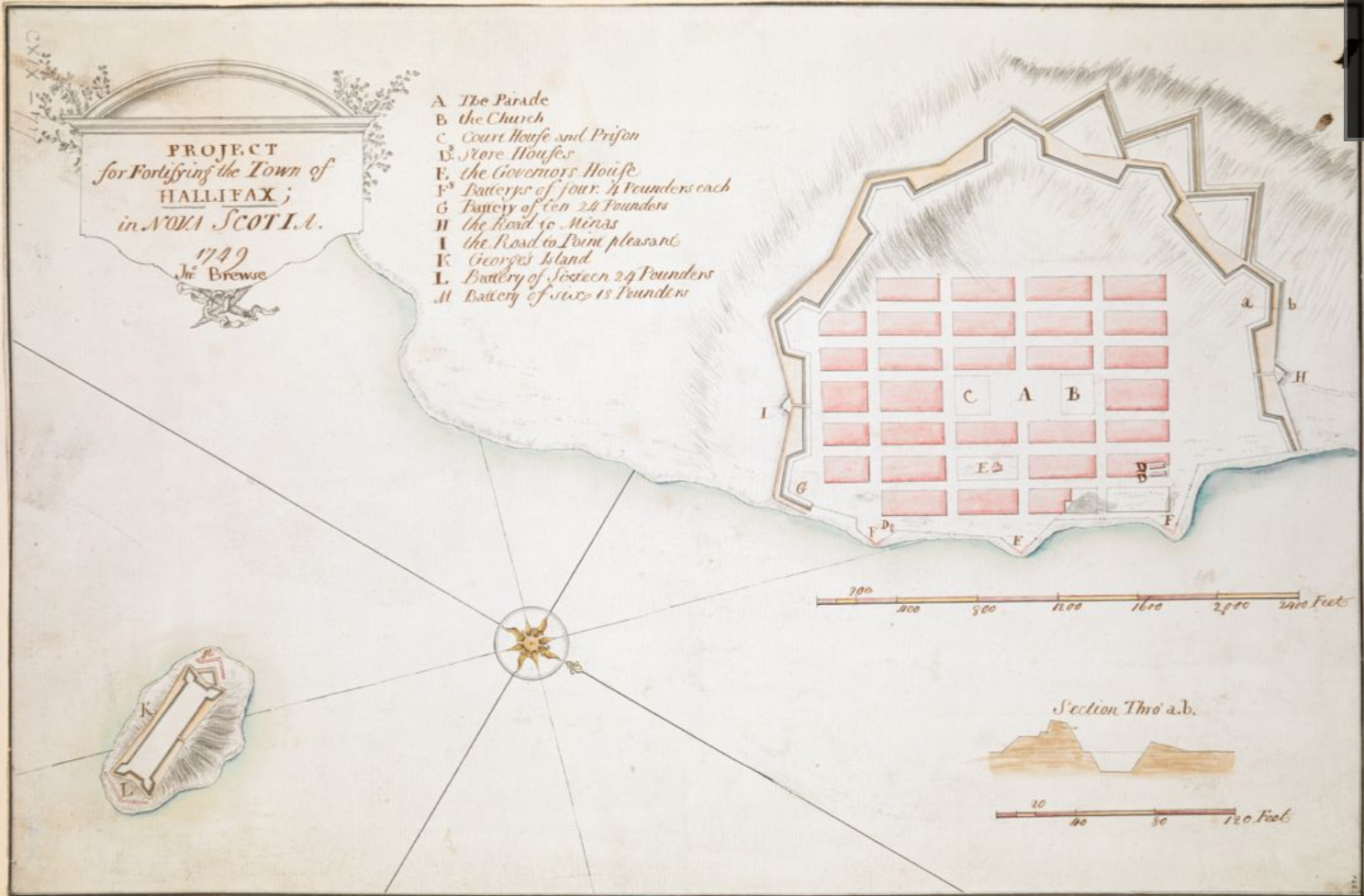
PROJECT for Fortifying the Town of HALLIFAX; in NOVA SCOTIA by John Brewse, 1749
