= East Linden =

Community in Nova Scotia, Canada

Coordinates: 45°53′30.91″N 63°49′5.54″W

East Linden in Nova Scotia

East Linden is a small community in the Canadian province of Nova Scotia, located in Cumberland County.
