= Murray Beach Provincial Park =

Provincial Park in New Brunswick, Canada

- IUCN category II (national park)
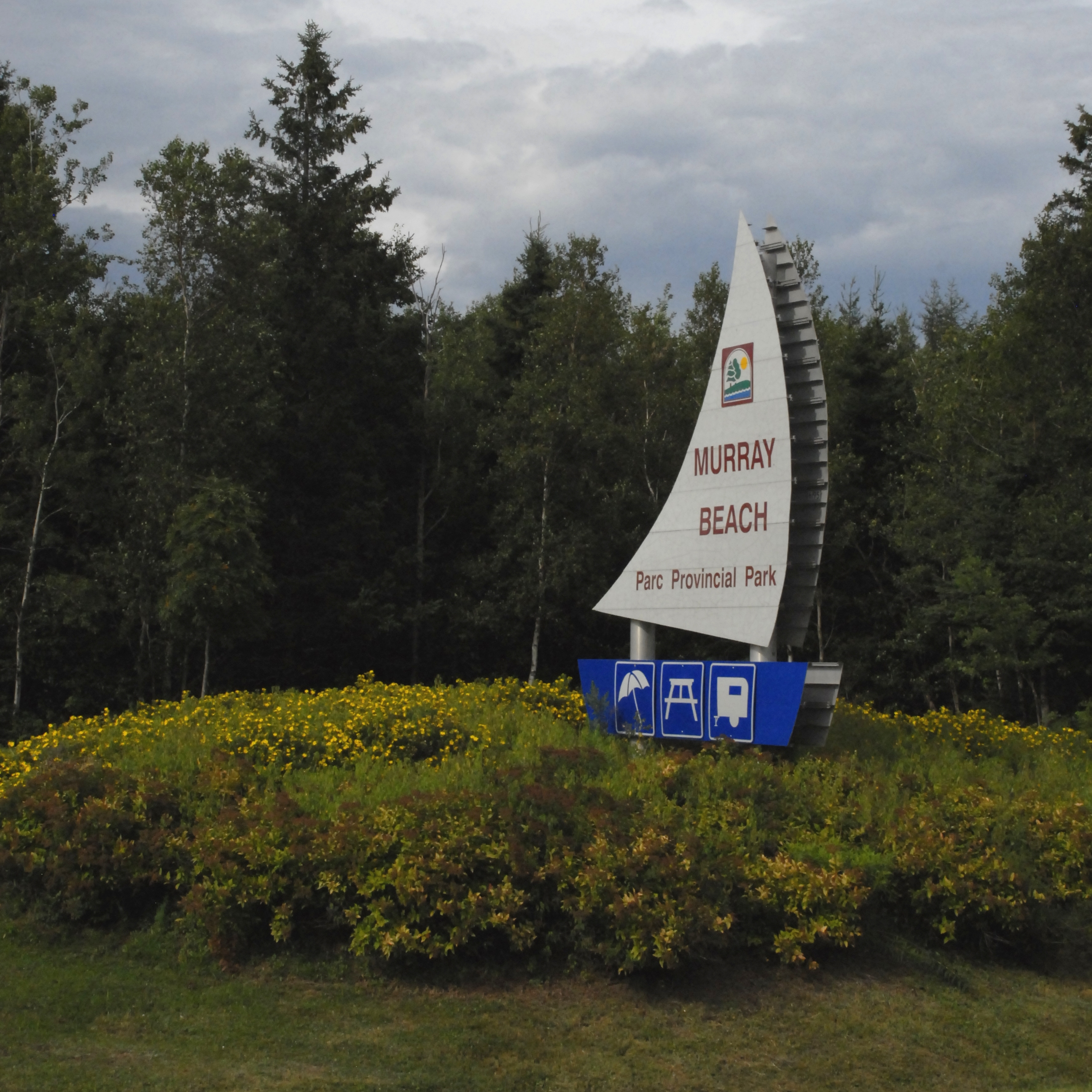
- Murray Beach Provincial Park
- Interactive map of Murray Beach Provincial Park
- Location: Murray Corner, New Brunswick, Canada
- Nearest city: Moncton, Summerside
- Coordinates: 46°10′48″N 63°58′55″W
- Governing body: Government of New Brunswick

Murray Beach Provincial Park is a provincial park in the Province of New Brunswick, Canada. It is located on Route 955 on the Northumberland Strait near the Little Shemogue River.

== See also ==
- List of New Brunswick parks
