= Gaspereau River (Northumberland Strait) =

Coordinates: 46°3′3″N 64°4′54″W

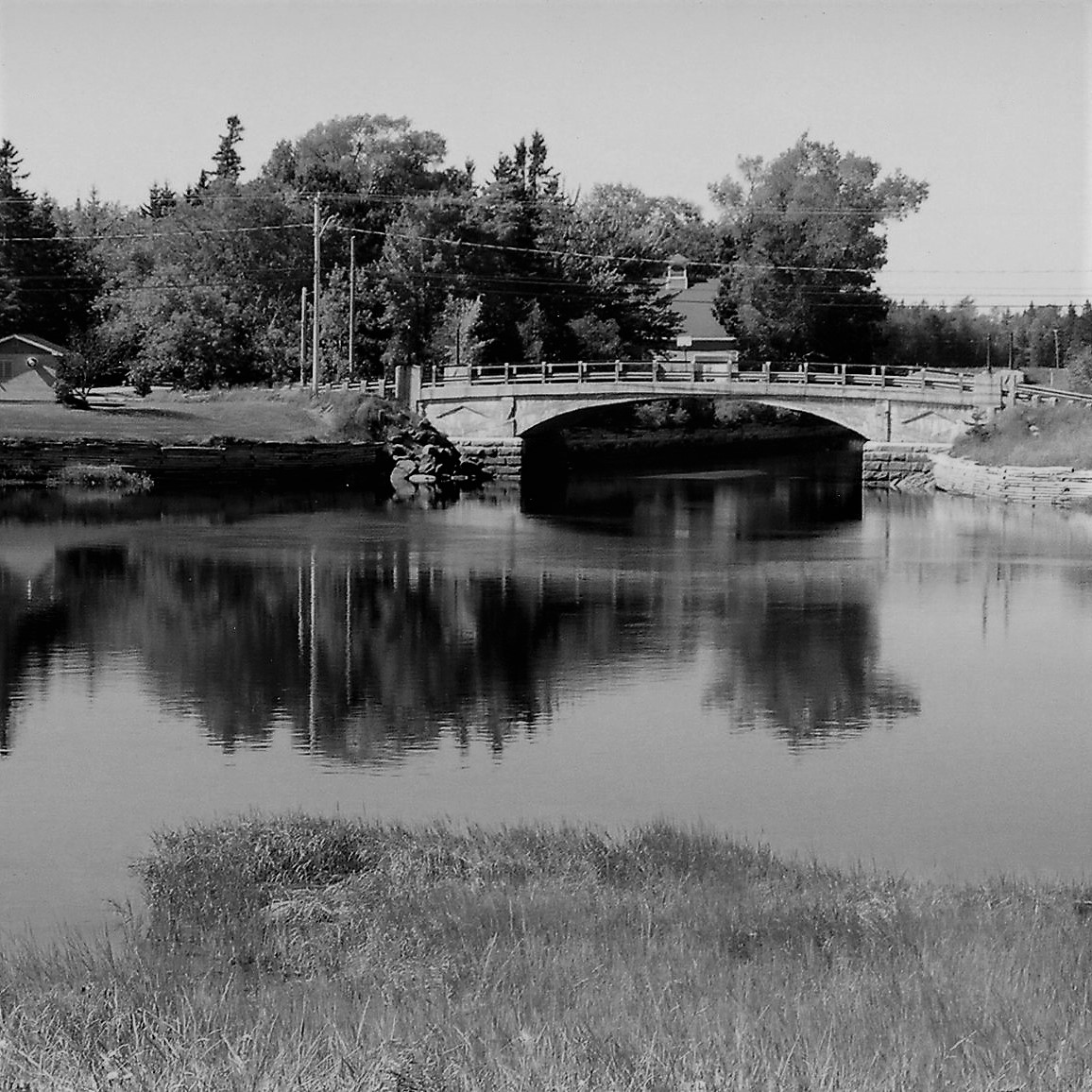
- Bridge across the Gaspereau River in Port Elgin

Location
- Country: Canada
- Province: New Brunswick

Physical characteristics
- Source
  - location: Square Lake
- Mouth
  - location: Baie Verte
  - elevation: sea level

The Gaspereau River is a small river in southeastern New Brunswick, Canada. It is located Westmorland County and flows from Square Lake into Baie Verte, a sub-basin of the Northumberland Strait, at Port Elgin.

== See also ==
- List of rivers of New Brunswick
