= Melrose, New Brunswick =

Canadian settlement

Coordinates: 46.0946°N 63.9442°W

Melrose is a settlement in Westmorland County, New Brunswick, Canada. It was founded by Irish settlers. Melrose is on Route 16. Originally named Savagetown, the name was changed to Melrose in 1890, after Melrose, Scottish Borders, when a post office was established.

== See also ==
- List of communities in New Brunswick
