= New Brunswick Route 955 =

Highway in New Brunswick, Canada

Route 955

Route information
- Maintained by New Brunswick Department of Transportation
- Length: 33.0 km (20.5 mi)

Major junctions
- West end: Route 15 in Mates Corner
- Route 16 (TCH) in Bayfield
- East end: Route 960 in Cape Tormentine

Location
- Country: Canada
- Province: New Brunswick
- Counties: Westmorland

Highway system
- Provincial highways in New Brunswick; Former routes
← Route 950	→ Route 960

Route 955 is a Canadian highway in Westmorland County, New Brunswick.

== Route description ==
The route's eastern terminus is in Mates Corner at Route 15. It travels east crossing Fox Creek Shemogue Harbour through a mostly treed area near Johnston Point then passes through Chapman Corner. As the route crosses McKays Creek, and Amos Creek, the route turns more north before entering Cadmans Corner. From here, the route turns east again following the Northumberland Strait and passes Murray Beach Provincial Park. From here the route crosses the Little Shemogue River as it enters Murray Corner, then enters Spence Settlement. From here, it crosses Route 16 near Confederation Bridge and Cape Jourimain. From here, it continues past through Bayfield then ending in Cape Tormentine at Route 960.

== History ==
The route ends at the end at the former Route 16 Prince Edward Island ferry crossing before the realignment for the Confederation Bridge.

== See also ==
- List of New Brunswick provincial highways
