= Tyndal Road =

Community in Nova Scotia, Canada

Coordinates: 45°51′35.61″N 64°8′22.4″W

Tyndal Road in Nova Scotia

Tyndal Road is a small community in the Canadian province of Nova Scotia, located in Cumberland County, Nova Scotia.
