= Tidnish River =

Coordinates: 45°58′59.9″N 64°2′56.9″W

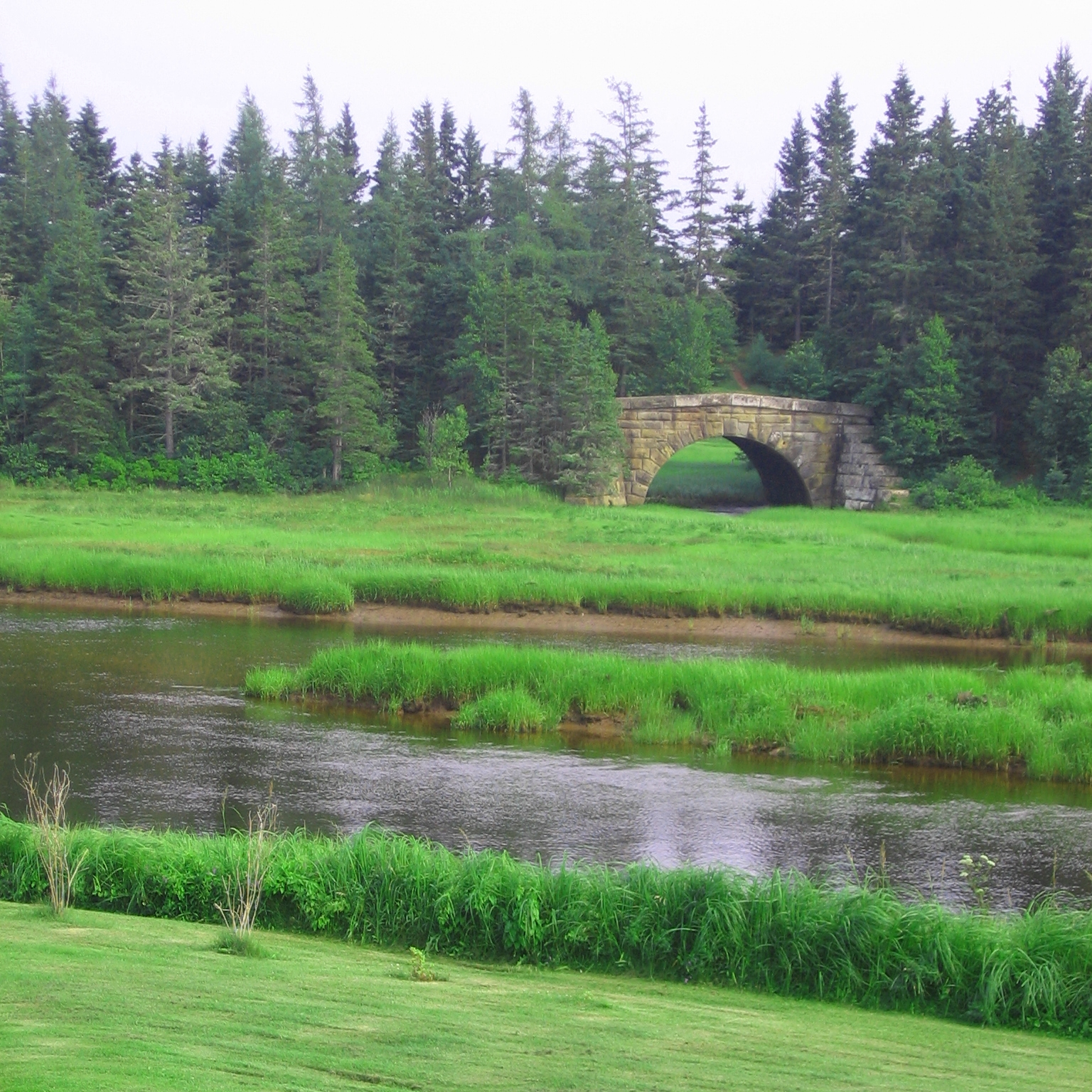
- Tidnish River near arch bridge for the defunct Chignecto Ship Railway.

Location
- Country: Canada

Physical characteristics
- Mouth
  - location: Northumberland Strait
  - elevation: sea level

The Tidnish River is a short Canadian river on the Isthmus of Chignecto along the interprovincial boundary with New Brunswick and Nova Scotia.

Rising in the northwest corner of Cumberland County, east of the interprovincial boundary, the river's largest tributaries are the West Branch Tidnish River, Little West Branch Tidneish River, Paradise Brook and Chapman's Brook.

The river becomes a tidal estuary at the community of Tidnish Bridge where the Chignecto Ship Railway constructed a large stone masonry bridge across it. At Tidnish Bridge, the river flows the final 2 kilometres in a serpentine manner to discharge into the Northumberland Strait at Jacksons Point on Baie Verte.

This section of the river downstream from Tidnish Bridge also forms part of the interprovincial boundary with New Brunswick. The river provides safe harbour in this downstream area. The river is carefully navigable in its upper reaches past the Chignetco bridge during high tides. The mouth of the river supports a smelt fishery, although this activity has been in slow decline. Typically, fishermen use large bag nets of about 28 feet in width. These are set from rafts or, in winter, from holes cut in the ice and allowed to "strain" the tide to catch smelt. No lobster boats run out of the Tidnish River, but on occasion, herring and mackerel boats may be seen.

== See also ==
- List of rivers of Nova Scotia
