= Amherst Shore =

Community in Nova Scotia, Canada

Coordinates: 45°58′23.18″N 63°54′19.48″W

Amherst Shore in Nova Scotia

Amherst Shore is a small community in the Canadian province of Nova Scotia, located in Cumberland County.
