= Lorneville, Nova Scotia =

Community in Nova Scotia, Canada

Coordinates: 45°59′8.7″N 63°56′21.22″W

Lorneville in Nova Scotia

Lorneville is an unincorporated community in the Canadian province of Nova Scotia, located in Cumberland County.
