= Tidnish Bridge, Nova Scotia =

Community in Nova Scotia, Canada

Coordinates: 45°58′33″N 64°2′53″W

Tidnish Bridge in Nova Scotia

Tidnish Bridge is a community in the Canadian province of Nova Scotia, located in Cumberland County on the interprovincial border with New Brunswick between Upper Tidnish, and Lower Tidnish on the Tidnish River.

Tidnish Bridge is home to the Chignecto Ship Railway Keystone Bridge and would have been the Baie Verte terminus. Tidnish Dock Provincial Park is where the last piece of the project remained. The name Tidnish is of Mi'kmaqi origin, said to signify "A Paddle".

== Notable residents ==
- Harry Thurston
