= Strait Shores =

- Rural community
- Location within New Brunswick
- Coordinates: 46°04′59″N 64°09′29″W
- Country: Canada
- Province: New Brunswick
- County: Westmorland
- Regional service commission: Southeast
- Incorporated: January 1, 2023

Government
  - Mayor: Annamarie Lynn Boyd
  - MP: Dominic LeBlanc
  - MLA: Megan Mitton

Area
  - Total: 538 km^{2} (208 sq mi)
- Time zone: UTC-4 (AST)
  - Summer (DST): UTC-3 (ADT)
- Access Routes: Route 16 (TCH); Route 15; Route 970

Strait Shores is an incorporated rural community in the Canadian province of New Brunswick. It was formed through the 2023 New Brunswick local governance reforms.

== History ==
Strait Shores was incorporated on January 1, 2023 from the combination of the village of Port Elgin, New Brunswick with the local service districts of Baie Verte, Bayfield, Cape Tormentine, and parts of the LSDs of the parish of Botsford and the parish of Westmorland.

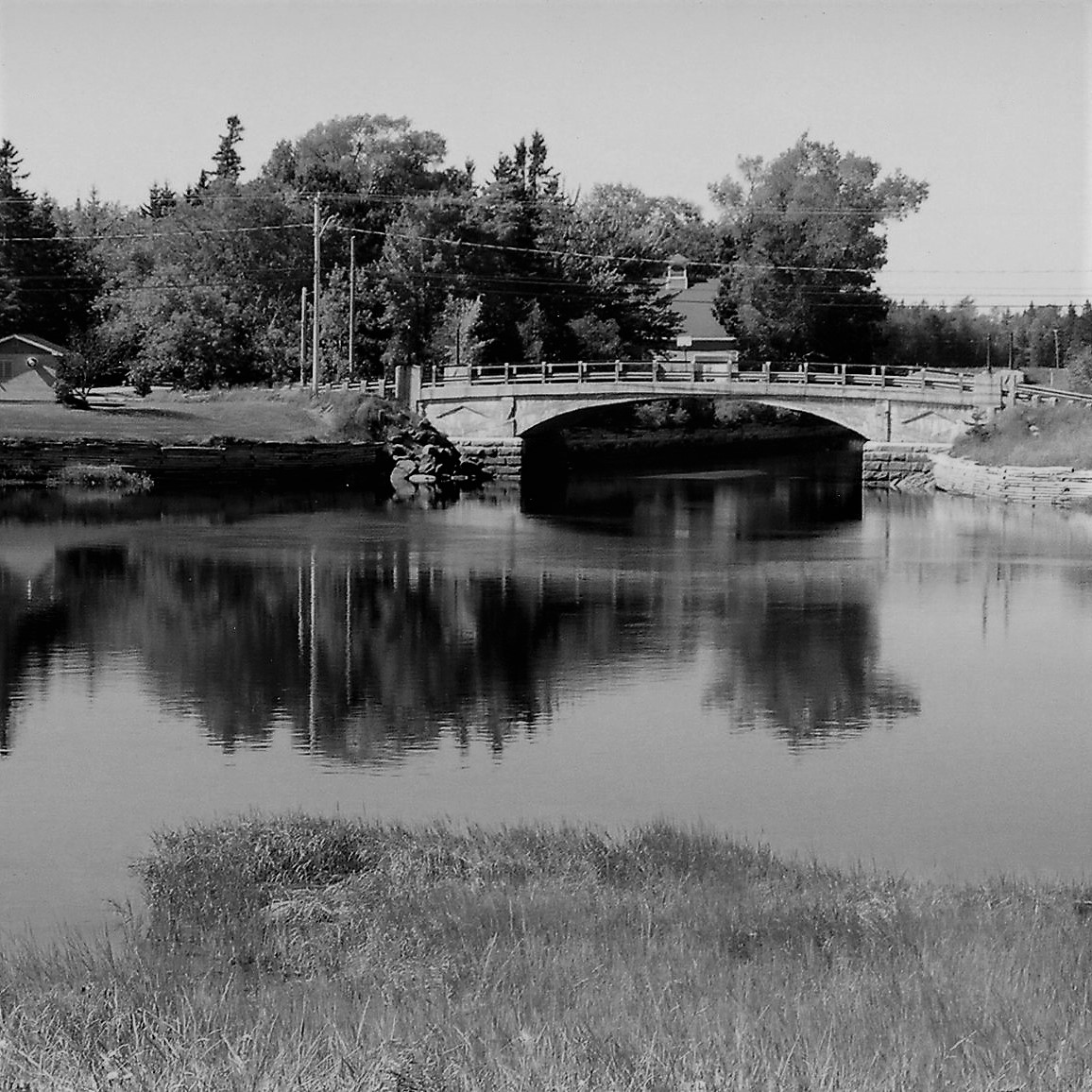
Bridge across the Gaspereau River in Strait Shores, New Brunswick

== See also ==
- List of communities in New Brunswick
- List of municipalities in New Brunswick
