= Baie Verte, New Brunswick =

Community in New Brunswick, Canada

Coordinates: 46.014861°N 64.103167°W

Location of Baie Verte in New Brunswick

Baie Verte is a community in Westmorland County in the Canadian province of New Brunswick.

Of French origin: "...from the salt water grasses which in the summer make the bay look like an immense meadow" (Ganong). Variations: Franquelin, 1686-Baye Verte; Moll, 1715-Green Bay; Haliburton, 1829-Bay Verte.

The community is situated near the Confederation Bridge to Prince Edward Island and is surrounded by a large area of salt marsh with much wildlife including birds, deer and skunks. It is home to the Winegarden Estate vineyard and the Waterfowl Village.

The local service district of Baie-Verte took its name from the community but added a hyphen.

== Demographics ==
In the 2021 Census of Population conducted by Statistics Canada, Baie-Verte had a population of 421 living in 186 of its 308 total private dwellings, a change of 33.2% from its 2016 population of 316. With a land area of 35.54 km^{2} (13.72 sq mi), it had a population density of 11.8/km^{2} (30.7/sq mi) in 2021.

== See also ==
- List of communities in New Brunswick
