= Tidnish Cross Roads =

Community in Nova Scotia, Canada

Coordinates: 45°59′33.61″N 64°0′30.27″W

Tidnish Cross Roads in Nova Scotia

Tidnish Cross Roads is a small community in the Canadian province of Nova Scotia, located in Cumberland County.
