= Acadian literature =

Acadian literature is literature produced in Acadia, (Note: Acadia roughly encompasses the north and east of the Canadian province of New Brunswick, as well as more isolated communities in Prince Edward Island, Newfoundland and Labrador, and Nova Scotia. More broadly, Acadia also refers to the communities of the Acadian diaspora in Quebec and the United States; people of Acadian descent can also be found in France, the Falkland Islands and the Caribbean. Acadia is not officially recognized, but would constitute a nation through its language, culture, institutions, and symbols.) or considered as such.

The colonial period was characterized by a scarcity of textual production, largely attributable to the challenging socio-economic circumstances prevailing at the time. The poem Evangeline by American Henry Longfellow exerted a considerable influence on the emergence of Acadian literature. From the mid-19th century onwards, priest-writers began to publish. Historians such as Placide Gaudet and Pascal Poirier subsequently contributed to the field, and nationalist debates shaped the literature until the 1960s. From 1966 onwards, a new generation of authors challenged traditional values. In the early 1970s, poetry collections such as Cri de terre by Raymond Guy LeBlanc, Acadie Rock by Guy Arsenault, Saison antérieures by Léonard Forest, and Mourir à Scoudouc by Herménégilde Chiasson marked this turning point. The success of these writers influenced others, including Melvin Gallant, whose collections of tales, Ti-Jean, and Louis Haché, whose historical novels were well received. Claude Le Bouthillier and Ulysse Landry also made an impact with their speculative fiction and poetry, respectively. In 1979, Antonine Maillet was awarded the esteemed Prix Goncourt for her novel Pélagie-la-Charrette.

Dyane Léger, the inaugural Acadian female author to be published, released a poetry collection in 1980. Gérald Leblanc also made a significant contribution during this decade.

The establishment of Éditions d'Acadie in 1972 facilitated the broader dissemination of works and enabled local publishing. Among other publishing houses, Éditions Perce-Neige has distinguished itself in the field of poetry, while Bouton d'or Acadie has established a reputation for excellence in children's literature. In 2000, Éditions d'Acadie filed for bankruptcy, compelling numerous authors to seek out publishers in Quebec or Ontario. A portion of the repertoire remains unavailable in bookstores. Several anthologies and literary histories have been published, notably by Marguerite Maillet and David Lonergan. Criticism only truly developed in the 1990s, yet Acadian authors faced challenges in gaining recognition and popularizing their works outside of Acadia. However, the number of writers and the quality of their work have grown significantly.

== Origins ==
=== French regime ===
The colony of Acadia was established in 1604 by Pierre Dugua de Mons. Subsequently, Jean de Poutrincourt was bestowed the title of lieutenant-governor of Acadia, contingent upon his fulfillment of certain obligations, including the introduction of settlers. In 1606, he brought dozens of artisans, several noteworthy individuals, and the lawyer Marc Lescarbot. During his one-year tenure, Lescarbot established the foundations of Acadian literature in Port-Royal. In his writings, Lescarbot sought to elucidate the shortcomings of previous expeditions while refuting several pervasive myths about America, concurrently creating the myth of Acadia as the Promised Land.

For Nicolas Denys, the myth revolved around abundance; he compared Acadia to the land of Cockaigne. In 1672, at the age of 74, he published Description géographique et historique des côtes de l'Amérique septentrionale, avec l'histoire naturelle de ce pays, in which he offered a critique of those who had prevented him from achieving his dream while urging others to take up the cause. He concluded that Acadia would only develop and avoid being abandoned to France's enemies if internal quarrels ceased. Dière de Dièreville visited Port-Royal in 1699 and was disheartened by the condition of the settlement and the poverty of its inhabitants. This was in stark contrast to the "false representation" he had previously received of Acadia. Although originally composed in verse, Relation du Voyage du Port Royal de l'Acadie (1708) accounts accurately the fauna, flora, and especially the daily life in Acadia. From his text, the carefree and benevolent spirit of the colony emerges, though he questions the king's apparent disinterest in the colony, despite the population's demonstrated loyalty. In Memoirs (1716), Robert Charles, a proponent of social justice and a visionary thinker, also denounced this situation, proposing a policy that would transform New France "into a kingdom as flourishing as old Europe." His concise and incisive style synthesizes the fervor of Lescarbot with the assurance of Denys.

In 1616, Pierre Biard, a Jesuit, published Relation de la Nouvelle-France. In his text, he likely refers to Lescarbot to dismantle the illusions created by previous accounts. Nevertheless, he depicts a beautiful colony with great potential, which France should continue to colonize and evangelize. This text offers valuable insights into his disagreements with the lords of Port-Royal, the early struggles between France and England for dominance in North America, and the challenges and hopes of evangelizing the Indigenous peoples. Subsequently, numerous missionaries would espouse a similar conviction regarding the necessity of acquiring proficiency in Indigenous languages. Chrétien Le Clercq is even reputed to have devised the Mi'kmaq hieroglyphs during his 10-year tenure in Gaspé. In Nouvelle Relations de la Gaspésie (1691), he portrayed the customs of the Mi'kmaq people with remarkable vividness and sensitivity.

=== British regime ===
Following the transfer of Acadia to England in 1713, there was a dearth of written accounts by French individuals about the colony. However, Île Royale and Île Saint-Jean (now Prince Edward Island and Cape Breton Island) remained French possessions, and missionaries and administrators corresponded with the Acadians and the government to propose solutions. Notwithstanding the perspicacious observations proffered by Louis Franquet in his travel reports to Île Royale and Île Saint-Jean (1751) and Canada (1752 and 1753), the government remained unmoved in its stance towards its colonies. The tumultuous political climate and the gradual demographic expansion since the colony's inception account for the paucity of texts produced by Acadians during this era.

=== Grand Dérangement ===
From 1755 to 1763, the Acadian population was forcibly deported. In contrast to the preceding period, numerous French authors produced written works on Acadia during this time. Abbé François Le Guerne, the sole Catholic priest in British territory for two years, articulated the Acadians' resolute determination to remain in what had been, until that point, "a paradise on earth." Following the deportation, a period elapsed before Acadian literature reappeared; however, oral traditions remained robust. However, the themes of deportation and exile were seldom present in the narratives of the period, including tales, legends, laments, and songs. Letters from Vénérande Robichaud to her brother Otho, whose entire family was deported to Boston, illustrate the emotional challenges faced by exiles in maintaining contact with their scattered families and in coping with their living conditions. Other letters, such as those from Mathurin Bourg and French Canadian missionaries, provide insight into the challenging work of priests, the poor living conditions, and the gradual reorganization of Acadian society. During their exile, the Acadians sent numerous petitions to governments, which can be considered the foundation of Acadian literature. These petitions perpetuated the myth of Acadia as the Promised Land, later replaced by Louisiana as a destination, though not in the collective consciousness of the first generations.

Foreign authors were the first to create the myth of a lost Acadia and a martyred, resigned, and faithful people. The initial significant contribution to this field was Evangeline, an American work by Henry Longfellow, published in 1847. In his account, Longfellow depicted the Acadians in a manner reminiscent of Dièreville, albeit with the addition of the detail that they had become landowners with large livestock herds. The narrative commences with the betrothal of Evangeline and Gabriel. On the following day, the British government issued an edict for the deportation of the Acadians, thereby bringing an end to the golden age of the Acadian people and separating the two lovers. Evangeline sets out to find Gabriel, while he wanders, attempting to forget his sorrow. They narrowly miss each other in Louisiana, where many Acadians had taken refuge. In old age, Evangeline concludes her search and becomes a nun in a hospital in Philadelphia, where she finally encounters Gabriel, who is dying. The poem was an immediate success and prompted discussions about the veracity of the events described, drawing European and American attention to the plight of the Acadians.

The novel Jacques et Marie by Napoleon Bourassa was serialized in 1865, the same year the French version of Evangeline was released. Probably, the novel was more widely read in Acadia than Longfellow's poem. Nevertheless, both Longfellow and Bourassa exerted a significant influence on Acadian literature. The significance of Evangeline is such that the poem contributed to the Acadian Renaissance and was adopted by the Acadians as a national symbol. Subsequently, numerous other authors have published novels on the subject of the deportation. In 1859, Frenchman François-Edme Rameau de Saint-Père published La France aux colonies: Acadiens et Canadiens. The term "Acadiens et Canadiens" is used to refer to the French-speaking inhabitants of Canada. He articulated his conviction in the necessity of revitalizing the Acadian populace and, in a sense, delineated a strategy to guarantee their perpetuation. Rameau generated considerable interest in Acadia, leading him to undertake two trips to the region. His writings were published in local newspapers, which lauded him as a benefactor and esteemed friend of the Acadians. Rameau's influence on Acadian literature persisted until the mid-20th century. Furthermore, the program he proposed influenced an entire generation, culminating in the Acadian National Convention.

== Acadian renaissance ==
The establishment of educational institutions in the 19th century, followed by the Acadian National Convention, facilitated the rediscovery of identity and aspirations among the Acadians and their clergy in an Anglophone context. During this period, writer-priests such as Philéas-Frédéric Bourgeois, Alexandre Braud, and André-Thaddée Bourque began publishing. The rediscovery of Acadian history led to a significant number of texts, particularly those by Placide Gaudet, Joseph-Fidèle Raîche, and Pascal Poirier. Until the 1960s, Acadian literature was dominated by nationalist debate.

== Nationalist era ==
In the 20th century, the importance of nationalism declined, and numerous authors, including Antonine Maillet, shifted their attention to other subjects.

Many authors from the diaspora published during the 1940s, 1950s, and 1960s, including Eddy Boudreau, Donat Coste (pseudonym of Daniel Boudreau), and Ronald Després. Despite spending the majority of his life outside of Acadie, Després is regarded as the pioneering figure in Acadian literature by contemporary poets. Given the circumstances of the time, authors needed to be published in Quebec, as evidenced by the case of Antonine Maillet, who became a prominent figure representing Acadie. She created a universal work, inspired by her life and firmly rooted in the environment of her hometown, Bouctouche.

The 1960s saw the emergence of a new generation of authors who began to challenge traditional values. This movement gained further impetus from many socio-political developments, including the Quiet Revolution in Quebec, Louis Robichaud's reforms in New Brunswick, student strikes, and the phenomenal success of La Sagouine by Antonine Maillet. Poetry was the first literary form to embrace this trend, with the novel also seeing a shift in focus towards the work of Antonine Maillet. However, many other authors made significant contributions to this period of literary change.

The years 1972 and 1973 were pivotal in the history of the arts in Acadie. These years saw the release of the controversial "antilivre" L'étoile maganée by Herménégilde Chiasson and the Savoie brothers Jacques and Gilles, the launch of the leftist magazine L'Acayen, and the introduction of the inaugural course on Francophone Canadian literature at the University of Moncton by Marguerite Maillet.

In this context, professors from the University of Moncton, convened by Melvin Gallant, established Éditions d'Acadie in 1972. This event served as the impetus for the expression initiated by young writers in 1966. The inaugural text published was Cri de terre by Raymond Guy LeBlanc, who served as the harbinger of a poetic tradition rooted in the land and reflective of the modern Acadian identity. In 1973, Guy Arsenault, a teenager at the time, incorporated chiac in his work Acadie Rock. In Saisons antérieures (1973), Léonard Forest approaches Acadie from a romantic and even nostalgic perspective. A fourth poetry collection, Mourir à Scoudouc (1974) by Herménégilde Chiasson, presented the dilemmas facing the quest for the land. These early titles achieved notable commercial success, and new genres were introduced, including the story collection Ti-Jean (1973) by Melvin Gallant and Charmante Miscou (1974) by Louis Haché, which combined narrative, short story, and tale. However, Éditions d'Acadie encountered financial challenges between 1976 and 1978. In 1977, three noteworthy publications were released: Rapport sur l'état de mes illusions by Herménégilde Chiasson, Tabous aux épines de sang by Ulysse Landry, and L'Acadien reprend son pays by Claude Le Bouthillier.

Notwithstanding her marginal status within the context of Acadian literary production, Antonine Maillet continued to occupy a position of considerable significance. As early as 1972, Maillet developed the Île-aux-Puces cycle, which inspired Pays de la Sagouine recreational and tourist complex. This began with the novel Don l'Orignal, which won the Governor General's Award, and continued with Mariaagélas in 1973. Maillet's Les Cordes-de-bois was completed in 1977, and her Pélagie-la-charrette earned her the prestigious Goncourt Prize in 1979. Additionally, she made a notable impact in theater, particularly with her 1971 play La Sagouine, which featured the performance of its sole actress, Viola Léger.

The growth of Acadian literature coincided with the emergence of Acadian theater, a phenomenon that led to the establishment of the drama department at the University of Moncton. The inaugural cohort of graduates from this department adapted Acadian novels as early as the conclusion of their studies, with Ti-Jean being one such example, published in 1978.

The Acadian Writers Association was established in 1979, and in the following year, it launched the literary magazine Éloizes and Éditions Perce-Neige.

== Prise de parole (1980–1989) ==
The Acadian Writers Association (AÉA) was established in 1979. Concurrently, Éditions d'Acadie was receiving an increasing number of manuscripts that could not be accommodated within the publishing house's capacity. Consequently, the AÉA established the literary magazine Éloizes and Éditions Perce-Neige in 1980. To prevent the fragmentation of the artistic community, the objective of this publishing house was to initially disseminate the inaugural work of an author, with subsequent publications subsequently undertaken by Éditions d'Acadie. However, this practice resulted in Éditions Perce-Neige being eclipsed by Éditions d'Acadie. Nevertheless, the inaugural title was Graines de fées by Dyane Léger, the inaugural Acadian woman to publish a poetry collection. In 1981, Gérald Leblanc, renowned for his lyrical contributions to the musical band 1755, released his debut poetry collection, Comme un otage du quotidien. The list of noteworthy authors published by Éditions Perce-Neige continued to expand, encompassing the works of Georges Bourgeois, Rose Després, Daniel Dugas, Martin Pître, and Rino Morin Rossignol.

In 1984, Éditions d'Acadie reached its full growth potential. However, the company encountered significant financial challenges due to its foray into textbook publishing, an area in which it lacked the requisite expertise and encountered the demands of the New Brunswick government. In 1986, Michel Henry relinquished his role in managing Éditions d'Acadie to establish his own publishing house. This venture attracted numerous authors who had previously been published by Éditions d'Acadie, including Guy Arsenault, Herménégilde Chiasson, Gérald Leblanc, Raymond Guy LeBlanc, and Daniel Dugas, who had previously been associated with Éditions Perce-Neige. Additionally, Michel Henry Éditeur played a significant role in the realm of theatre. The departure of most authors from Éditions Perce-Neige to Éditions d'Acadie resulted in the closure of the latter in 1988. Furthermore, the lack of interest from the general public and the media in Michel Henry's publications led to the demise of his publishing house in 1989.

In L'extrême frontière (1988), Gérald Leblanc attempted the initial synthesis of his poetic oeuvre, while Roméo Savoie connected painting and poetry in Trajets dispersés (1989). The inaugural collection by Serge Patrice Thibodeau, La Septième chute (1990), received considerable attention, and its themes diverged from those of other works of the time.

Éditions d'Acadie was the only publisher releasing novels: psychological novels by Melvin Gallant (Le Chant des grenouilles, 1982) and Claude Le Bouthillier (C’est pour quand le paradis, 1984), or historical novels by Louis Haché (Un Cortège d’anguilles, 1985). Germaine Comeau explores everyday life in L’Été aux puits secs (1983), tandis que France Daigle integrates poetry into the novels Sans jamais parler du vent (1983), Film d’amour et de dépendance (1984) and Histoire de la maison qui brûle (1985), and Christiane Saint-Pierre gives a touch of fantasy to texts that are nonetheless serious in Sur les pas de la mer (1986) and Absente pour la journée (1989).

Herménégilde Chiasson also produced a large body of theatre work. Encouraged by the success of Pélagie-la-charrette, Antonine Maillet wrote other novels, including Cent ans dans les bois (1981), Crache à pic (1984), and Le Huitième Jour (1986); she also continued her theatrical work. Acadian literature was recognized both in North America and France. In addition to Antonine Maillet, other authors published in Quebec include France Daigle, Hélène Harbec, Claude Le Bouthillier, Laurier Melanson, and Jacques Savoie.

== Diversification (1990–2000) ==
The Regroupement des éditeurs canadiens-français was founded in 1989. It signed an agreement with the distributor Prologue, thus facilitating access to the Quebec market for Acadian authors. The Association des écrivains acadiens lost influence by 1986 and was replaced in 1990 by the Association acadienne des artistes professionnels(les) du Nouveau-Brunswick. Éditions Perce-Neige was revived in 1991. It signed a co-publishing agreement with Écrits des forges in Quebec. The agreement was canceled three years later, but it helped to popularise the leading Acadian poets in Quebec.

Gérald Leblanc published five collections between 1991 and 1995, but his Éloge du chiac (1995) most clearly illustrated his concerns. Herménégilde Chiasson also stood out in poetry with Climats (1996), one of his six collections from the 1990s, which was a kind of synthesis of his work. Serge Patrice Thibodeau also published six collections, including Le Cycle de Prague (1992), in which formal structure became essential to his writing.

Antonine Maillet began to focus her work on her personal experiences, notably with Les Confessions de Jeanne de Valois (1992), a biography of the headmistress of the college where she began her studies. However, the opening of the Pays de la Sagouine in Bouctouche that same year encouraged her to produce new texts every year; this leisure and tourist complex is based on the main characters of the La Sagouine cycle.

The number of works published increased significantly, reaching 44 in 1996 alone, covering all themes and target groups. Éditions Perce-Neige and Éditions d'Acadie shared the major poetry collections, but during the 1990s Perce-Neige concentrated more on poetry, while Éditions d'Acadie concentrated on novels.

The leading poets of the mid-1990s were Martin Pître (La Morsure du désir, 1993), Georges Bourgeois (Les Mots sauvages, 1994), Rino Morin Rossignol (La Rupture des gestes, 1994 and L'Éclat du silence, 1998), Hélène Harbec (Le Cahier des absences et de la décision, 1991) and Roméo Savoie (L'Eau brisée, 1992 and Dans l'ombre des images, 1996).

France Daigle wrote four novels during this period, initially formalist but increasingly open, as in Pas pire (1998). Louis Haché continued his work on the history of the Acadian Peninsula, notably with La Tracadienne (1996). Françoise Enguehard also wrote historical novels (Les Litanies de l'Île-aux-Chiens, 1999). Gracia Couturier's early novels were inspired by fractals and chaos theory (L'Antichambre, 1997).

Mario Thériault, originally a poet, became known for his collection of short stories, Terre sur mer (1997). Marc Arsenault used chiac in À l'antenne des oracles (1992) as an assertion of an urban Acadia, specifically Moncton; other writers from the city later adopted the language. However, it was Jean Babineau who mixed French, Chiac, and English as much as his characters in novels such as Bloupe (1993). Christian Brun addressed similar concerns in his poetry (Tremplin, 1996), but it was his search for meaning in images rather than language that guided his work.

According to David Lonergan, it would be appropriate to speak of a "Moncton school", opposed by a "Robertville school" that emerged at the end of the 20th century with writers such as Fredric Gary Comeau and Martin Pître. Éric Cormier expressed the difficulty of living and adapting in À vif tel un circoncis (1997), and Christian Roy questioned life and his relationship with others to question himself in Pile ou face à la vitesse de la lumière (1998).

Judith Hamel published En chair et en eau (1993), a hymn to life, a little outside the field of young poets, before turning to children's literature. Daniel Dugas's poems (Le Bruit des choses, 1995) use humor, satire, and irony to criticize society. Rose Després was the most important Acadian poet; in Gymnastique pour un soir d'anguilles (1996) and La Vie prodigieuse (2000), she struggled with language and its opacity, expressing her fears but transforming her pain into a nourishing strength. Each of Dyane Léger's collections, including Les Anges en transit (1992), revolved around a series of life events or feelings.

After fifteen years, Ulysse Landry published another collection, L'Espoir de te retrouver (1992), which presented a dark and pessimistic view of the world. In his two novels, Sacré montagne de fou (1996) and La Danse sauvage (2000), his characters fight the system but are powerless.

Some authors continued to publish all or part of their work in Quebec, including Hélène Harbec, Martine L. Jacquot, Claude Le Bouthillier, and Jacques Savoie. Éditions La Grande Marée, founded in 1993, initially focused on regional themes but managed to attract renowned authors such as Laval Goupil and Édith Bourget. Marguerite Maillet founded Bouton d'or Acadie, which enabled children's authors such as Denise Paquette and Édith Bourget to find an audience and encouraged others such as Léonard Forest, Françoise Enguehard, and Judith Hamel to take an interest in children's literature. Two other publishers were created, but they remained regional and lasted only a few years. After publishing 4,000 titles, Éditions d'Acadie went bankrupt in 2000.

== Restructuring and renewal (since 2000) ==
The bankruptcy of the Éditions d'Acadie forced writers to find other publishers who did not always have the necessary resources. Part of the repertoire disappeared from the shelves, and only Éditions Perce-Neige could afford to reprint the classics of Guy Arsenault and Raymond Guy LeBlanc. They also buy stock from Éditions d'Acadie, including the first novels by France Daigle, some collections by Herménégilde Chiasson, and the first novel by Françoise Enguehard. Éditions Perce-Neige was directed by Gérald Leblanc until he died in 2005 when Serge Patrice Thibodeau took over. The Bibliothèque canadienne française, a group based in Ontario, publishes some collections by Herménégilde Chiasson and Gérald Leblanc. Most other classics remain unavailable in bookstores. Éditions La Grande Marée attracted a few other authors and the quality of its publications gradually improved. Éditions de la Francophonie, founded in 2001 by Denis Sonier, publishes works of varying quality. Bouton d'or Acadie grew rapidly and became a reference in children's literature, attracting authors and illustrators from Quebec and Europe. Nevertheless, many Acadian writers had to turn to publishers in Quebec and Ontario, in particular Éditions Prise de Parole in Greater Sudbury. However, the weakening of Acadian publishing comes at a time when the number and quality of books published are increasing, suggesting that Acadian literature is not in trouble.

Éditions Perce-Neige publishes new collections by Hélène Harbec, Roméo Savoie, and the complete works of Léonard Forest, confirming its poetic orientation. Roméo Savoie completed the collection Une lointaine Irlande in 2001. The last three major collections by Gérald Leblanc -Le Plus clair du temps (2001), Technose (2004) and Poèmes new-yorkais (2006)- evoke people and places from his everyday life, in search of simplicity and rhythm. In 2000, Serge Patrice Thibodeau left the Quebec publishing house for Perce-Neige with his collection Le Roseau (2000). His poems are both more intimate and highly structured, a method he repeats in Seuls on est (2007) and Les Sept dernières paroles de Judas (2008). Seuils (2002) brings together the sequels to two collections published in 1992 but now out of print, Passage des glaces and Cycle de Prague, with unpublished texts, thus creating a link between the past and the present. Lieux cachés (2005) contains travel stories from the author's time as an activist for Amnesty International. Fredric Gary Comeau returned to Éditions Perce-Neige in 2005 with Naufrages, at the same time as launching his career as a singer-songwriter. His collections and albums complement each other: Aubes avec Ève rêve (2006) and Vérités avec Effeuiller les vertiges (2009).

Hélène Harbec developed her own style in poetry (Va, 2002; and Le Tracteur céleste, 2005) and in fiction (Les Voiliers blancs, 2002). With Chambre 503 (2009), she turned decisively to the novel. This last work is published by Éditions David in Ottawa, which shows that Ontario publishers are increasingly becoming an alternative to Acadian publishers. Other authors published by Perce-Neige remain loyal to the company, including Judith Hamel (Onze notes changeantes, 2003), Rino Morin Rossignol (Intifada du cœur, 2006), Éric Cormier (L'Hymne à l'apocalypse, 2001), Christian Roy (Personnes singulières, 2005) and Christian Brun (L'Évolution des contrastes, 2009).

Acadieman is one of the first Acadian comic books, created by Daniel "Dano" Omer Leblanc in the early 2000s. The series was adapted into an animated series that began airing in 2005. Following the great success of the series, the feature film Acadieman vs. le C.M.A. was made in 2009. Jean-François Gaudet and Hugues Poirier created the collection Le tour du Québec en BD, and the third episode, entitled Les Aventures de Winnyfred: La Grande virée acadienne, was released in 2009.

Daniel Omer Leblanc is one of the writers who belong to what seems to be the fourth generation of Acadian poets welcomed to Perce-Neige since 2000. Unlike his comic strips, which are written in chiac, his poems are written in normative French, although they reveal a linguistic tension, as in Les Ailes de soi (2000). Jean-Philippe Raîche's language, on the other hand, is sober, fluid and evocative, the result of an impressionistic search for the essence of love (Ne réveillez pas l'amour avant qu'elle ne le veuille, 2007). The texts of Paul Bossé, who started as a filmmaker, are like little scripts that comment humorously on society, all with a touch of Chiac (Un Cendrier plein d'ancêtres, 2001, and Saint-George/Robinson, 2007). Brigitte Harrison began with a critique of society in L'Écran du monde (2005) but turned to a more introspective vision in Le Cirque solitaire (2007). According to David Lonergan, the most original texts are those of Georgette Leblanc, who uses the Acadian French of St. Marys Bay to create a poetic narrative, Alma, which won her the Antonine Maillet/Acadie Vie Literary Prize in 2007.

Jean Babineau, whose work in chiac deals with what François Paré calls linguistic uncertainty, published the novel Vortex with Éditions Perce-Neige in 2004. Germaine Comeau's novel Laville, in a more traditional style, was also published there in 2008. Perce-Neige does not publish many novels, for no apparent reason, according to David Lonergan.

After the bankruptcy of Éditions d'Acadie in 2000, Herménégilde Chiasson published four titles in three years with four different publishers, including the collection of autobiographical stories Brunante and two works linked to collaborations with artists (Légendes and Actions). In 2005, he published the collection Parcours with Éditions Perce-Neige. Except for his works for children, all of his subsequent works were published by Éditions Prise de parole, marking the opening of the Franco-Ontarian company to Acadian literature. His poems are incantatory in Béatitudes (2007), winner of the Champlain Prize, while they are narrative in Solstices (2009). Rose Després also moved from Perce-Neige (La Vie prodigieuse, 2000) to Prise de parole (Si longtemps déjà, 2009), for which she won the Éloizes Prize. Her two collections are of great dramatic intensity and make her the most important Acadian poet. After several years of absence, Daniel Dugas clarified his social thought in the collection Même un détour serait correct (2006), also published in Ontario.

Les Litanies de l'Île-aux-Chiens, Françoise Enguehard's first novel, was republished in 2006.The novel L'Archipel du docteur Thomas, also set in her native archipelago of Saint-Pierre-et-Miquelon, won the Radio-Canada Readers' Prize in 2009.

With Madame Perfecta (2001), Antonine Maillet introduces her only non-Acadian protagonist in the only story set in her home. Le Temps me dure (2003) revives her childlike double Radi, while Pierre Bleu (2006) expands her repertoire of traditional characters, and Le Mystérieux voyage de Rien (2008) is a philosophical tale. Antonine Maillet continues to write for the theatre, but only for the needs of Le Pays de la Sagouine, without losing the power of her texts.

In the 2000s, Jacques Savoie concentrated mainly on television, but published the comic novel Les Soupes célestes (2005), while the success of the television series Les Lavigueur, la vraie histoire allowed him to publish the screenplay in 2008.

France Daigle's novel Pas pire was republished in 2002 by Éditions du Boréal, Quebec. The characters of Terry and Carmen, who had already appeared in Un fin de passage (2001) and Petites difficultés d'existence (2002), marked the culmination of the author's evolution from her earlier formalist and somewhat poetic novels, in which the characters, then the plot, became increasingly important, leaving ample space for dialogue tinged with chiac.

First published by Éditions d'Acadie, Claude Le Bouthillier moved to Quebec in 1989. In the 2000s, he published poetry collections (Tisons péninsulaires, 2001) with Éditions La Grande Marée, the novel Babel ressuscitée (2001) with Éditions de la Francophonie, and Le Feu du mauvais temps (2007) with Éditions de la Pleine Lune, about the fire that destroyed Bathurst in 1914.

Frenchman Alain Raimbault settled in Acadia in 1998 and has written poetry, novels, and children's books. His poems, published by Éditions David, are gentle and simple, ranging from haiku (Mon île muette, 2001) to short forms (Partir comme jamais, 2005). His novels, including Confidences à l'aveugle (2008), question the structure of the narrative and the reality of the romantic fable; they are published by Éditions Hurtubise.

Louis Haché continued his research into the history of the Acadian Peninsula with Le Desservant de Charnissey (2001) and La Maîtresse d'école (2003), published by Éditions de la Francophonie. For the same publisher, Melvin Gallant questioned the myth of Evangeline in Le Complexe d'Évangéline (2001). Le Métis de Beaubassin (2009) is another traditional historical novel.

Bouton d'or Acadie is becoming more and more successful thanks to its founder, Marguerite Maillet, who wants to interest children and young people in literature by publishing Acadian themes or at least Acadian authors. Melvin Gallant revisits his character Ti-Jean, with some modifications, in three new collections of stories. He also introduces the character of Tite-Jeanne (Tite-Jeanne et la pomme d'or, 2000). Judith Hamel created the Modo series, including Modo et la planète Mars (2000), and wrote the children's novel Respire par le nez (2004). Denise Paquette is primarily an illustrator, but she also writes her books (Quatre saisons dans les bois, 2007) and is the author of a touching children's novel, Annie a deux mamans (2003). At the request of Marguerite Maillet, Léonard Forest wrote two imaginative stories, including Les Trois pianos (2003), while Françoise Enguehard tells the story of her archipelago in Le Pilote du Roy (2007). Other children's authors alternate between publishing in Quebec and with Bouton d'or Acadie. In Une Terre de poésie (1999), Édith Bourget combines poetry and painting. Her writing tends towards juvenile themes, with collections of comic poems about the children of a family to whom the texts are attributed, notably in Autour de Gabriel (2004). She also wrote the novel Lola et le fleuve (2009). Alain Raimbault ventured into children's literature with Herménégilde l'Acadien (2000). He turned to fantasy and his most successful novels, Le Ciel en face (2005) and La Jeune lectrice (2008), were published by Bouton d'or Acadie.

The Montreal publisher La Courte Échelle publishes a collection of poetry for young people, with contributions from Serge Patrice Thibodeau (Du haut de mon arbre, 2002) and Herménégilde Chiasson (L'Oiseau tatoué, 2003) -who remain faithful to their approach while adapting to their new audience. In 2008, Herménégilde Chiasson completed her collection of short stories for young people, Dans la chaleur de l'amitié, for a new Acadian publisher, Les Éditions Karo; this text remains too close to the educational requirements of this publisher. Herménégilde Chiasson remains the principal playwright at the Théâtre l'Escaouette in Moncton.

== Cajun francophone literature ==
Upon arriving in Louisiana, the Acadians found their society divided by several factors. A minority of exiles adopted capitalism based on slavery, which allowed them to accumulate more wealth and integrate into higher social classes. More and more people began to identify as Creole or American rather than Cajun. Over the decades, Cajun culture became associated with ignorance and poverty. In 1916, a law made education in English compulsory. In 1900, 85% of the population of southwest Louisiana was French-speaking, but this dropped to 50% in 1950 and then to less than 12% in 1990, by which time most French speakers were over 60. Francophone Cajun literature, in the strictest sense, was born in 1980, when Jean Arcenaux published Cris sur le bayou. The first Acadian World Congress in 1994 gave a significant boost to the Louisianan Francophonie. Action Cadienne, an organization dedicated to promoting French in Louisiana, was founded in 1996. Several exchanges have also been organized between Louisiana and northern Acadia. Éditions d'Acadie, based in New Brunswick, published Lait à mère by David Cheramie. Éditions Perce-Neige, also in New Brunswick, launched the "Acadie tropicale" collection, whose first title was Faire récolte by Zachary Richard, followed by Suite du loup by Jean Arceneaux and À cette heure, la louve by Debbie Clifton. The latter also wrote in Louisiana Creole, as she was Creole herself.

== Genres ==
=== Novel ===
Among the works of note are La Sagouine (1971) by Antonine Maillet; Cri de terre (1972) by Raymond Guy LeBlanc; Acadie Rock (1973) by Guy Arsenault; Mourir à Scoudouc (1974) by Herménégilde Chiasson; Les portes tournantes (1984) by Jacques Savoie; and Éloge du chiac (1995) by Gérald Leblanc.

=== Essay ===
The newspaper L'Évangéline was one of the main platforms for Acadian essayists. From the 1970s to the 2000s, Léonard Forest, Régis Brun, Michel Roy, Léon Thériault, Rino Morin Rossignol, Herménégilde Chiasson, Robert Pichette, Jean-Marie Nadeau, and Claude Le Bouthillier, among others, left their mark on Acadian essay writing to varying degrees. From Michel Roy (L'Acadie perdue, 1978; L'Acadie des origines à nos jours, 1981) to Léon Thériault (La question du pouvoir en Acadie, 1982) to Jean-Marie Nadeau (Que le tintamarre commence!, 1992), the Acadian essay has often been a vehicle for a "discourse on the nation" or for (neo)nationalism.

Rino Morin Rossignol wrote essays in his columns for Le Matin and then for L'Acadie Nouvelle. Robert Pichette was a columnist for several newspapers, including L'Acadie Nouvelle, Telegraph Journal, and The Globe and Mail. The 2000s saw a renewed proliferation of columnists in the press, with L'Acadie Nouvelle offering weekly columns to Rino Morin Rossignol from 2001 and to Claude Le Bouthillier and Jean-Marie Nadeau from 2005. New voices have been added, such as Philippe Bernier Arcand, Serge Comeau, Stéphanie Chouinard, Françoise Enguehard, Céleste Godin, François Gravel, Marc Poirier, Sylvie Mousseau and Roger Ouellette.

In the spring of 2013, a new intellectual youth – more specifically, a group of four graduate students at the University of Ottawa – launched a new platform "open and dynamic to promote a renewal of Acadian discourse", which aims to be "a space for debate in French that seeks both to inform and to promote the exchange of ideas and cultural discoveries" (Astheure.com, "who are we?").

== Themes ==
=== Acadian identity and nationalism ===
The question of identity is central to Acadian literature of the 1970s, as is the definition of Acadian borders. In the 1980s, the trend shifted to advocacy and cultural intervention; Acadia created organizations to promote collective action and professionalization. In the 1990s, the question of identity was considered resolved, while the debate turned to the question of language.

Several writers from southeastern New Brunswick attempted to establish chiac as a literary language, a relatively marginal movement from which most writers from other regions distanced themselves. Jean Babineau is the author who goes furthest in this usage, moving from normative or familiar French to English and chiac as needed. France Daigle and Paul Bossé also use chiac more moderately. Herménégilde Chiasson reserves chiac for a few plays. Authors such as Louis Haché use old Acadian French, usually for dialogue, which is justifiable for historical novels. Georgette Leblanc stands out for her skillful use of the Acadian French of her home region, St. Marys Bay, in her collection Emma. This raises the question of the reach of Acadian French, which is mainly understood in the south-east. The desire to reach as many francophone readers as possible leads most authors to lean towards normative French. Even Gérald Leblanc, the author of Éloge du chiac, followed this line of thought.

=== Grand Dérangement ===
In the decades following the deportation, Acadia produced few written texts; oral tradition remained dominant; many stories begin with an elderly person telling his or her story. Despite this, the Grand Dérangement is largely absent from the narratives, which focus more on the enpremier, or historical Acadia, a situation that P.D. Clarke explains by the precarious position of the Acadians, the lack of a literate elite, the importance of oral tradition, and probably a desire to repress traumatic memories.

During the Acadian Renaissance of the 19th century, journalists proclaimed that the isolation of the Acadians was over and that their current situation was mainly due to deportation.

The bicentenary of the deportation in 1955 inspired Father Laurent Tremblay, whose three historical dramas (Évangéline, L'Exploit de Madeleine and Un matin tragique) portray women who are initiative, resourceful, and combative, as opposed to the submissive and obedient heroines of the previous period, foreshadowing Antonine Maillet's characters. In the same year, Paul Desmarins published Josette, la petite Acadienne and Traqués sans merci.

The traditional nationalist theme of deportation was revisited by Claude Le Bouthillier in The Feu du mauvais temps (1989) and Les Marées du Grand Dérangement (1994). Le Bouthillier's work is like a synthesis of previous novels: the betrothed Angéline and Tristan recall Gabriel and Evangeline, while the orphan girl recalls the heroine of Josette, la petite Acadienne. The author wanted to highlight "heroic actions, as opposed to the image of a resigned people [...] that has been portrayed." Ten years before Dan Brown's The Da Vinci Code, he proposed the theory that Jesus had children with Mary Magdalene (flesh-and-blood Holy Grails) who followed Joseph of Arimathea to Europe, some of whose descendants mixed with the Acadians, thus explaining the English persecutions.

Nous reviendrons en Acadie (2000), Herménégilde l'Acadien (2000), and Jacou d'Acadie (2001) are children's novels that aim to move the reader with sympathetic characters, to help them understand what a deportation could be like. In addition, most novels dealing with deportation have become sprawling works in which, according to Robert Viau, novelists have had to tell the stories of several characters in addition to the story itself to paint a complete portrait of the period. In Le Saule de Grand-Pré, published in 2001, René Verville describes the events of Grand-Pré and the characters’ emotions in great detail.

== Around literature ==
=== Criticism and research ===
The Acadian artistic milieu has long been too small to allow the necessary distance for objectivity and rigorous literary criticism. At the turn of the 21st century, criticism is still almost non-existent, due to a lack of resources and platforms to publish criticism that can itself be criticized, a lack of references to judge the quality of work and, above all, the fact that the environment is not accustomed to accepting negative criticism without perceiving it as malicious.

The most prolific literary critic is David Lonergan, who has been publishing in L'Acadie Nouvelle since 1994, with at least two pieces a week, depending on the year. Le Front, the student newspaper of the Université de Moncton, is also well known in this field, as are occasional reviews in the Revue de l'Université de Moncton and the literary magazine Ancrages, which replaced Éloizes. Martine L. Jacquot wrote reviews in the magazine Ven'd'est until its disappearance in the early 2000s, in the weekly Le Courrier de la Nouvelle-Écosse until the same period, and then in electronic media such as ecrits-vains.com. She later became editor-in-chief of the Cahiers canadiens, published by the University of Volgograd in Russia, which has a section devoted to Acadian literature. However, the electronic media are not very interested in criticism. Apart from the texts of David Lonergan and Le Front, most criticism focuses on literature. In Quebec, critics are mainly interested in Acadian artists living in that province, since most of the others are unknown outside Acadia. David Lonergan deplores the fact that the Acadian artists who receive the most awards are often those who are known in Quebec. There are also occasional academic publications in Acadia or elsewhere.

The University of Moncton participates in the publication of the journal Francophonies d'Amérique, in addition to publishing its own Revue de l'Université de Moncton and the research of the Anselme-Chiasson Centre for Acadian Studies.

The first anthology was published by the St. Joseph's College in 1893. It wasn't until 1979 that Marguerite Maillet, Gérald Leblanc and Bernard Émont completed Anthologie de textes littéraires acadiens, 1606–1975, proving that Acadian literature does exist. Marguerite Maillet published Histoire de la littérature acadienne in 1983, but it focuses on authors from before the 1970s. The first poetry anthology, compiled by Fred Cogswell and Jo-Anne Elder, was published in English in 1970 under the title Unfinished Dreams; it was translated into French the same year under the title Rêves inachevés, anthologie de poésie acadienne contemporaine. David Lonergan, for his part, published Paroles d'Acadie in 2010, a logical continuation of the 1979 anthology. Other anthologies have been published in the meantime, by Gérald Leblanc and Claude Beausoleil in 1988, by Gérald Leblanc again in 1999, and by Serge Patrice Thibodeau in 2009.

=== Funding ===
Acadian artists are often little known outside Acadia and therefore have more difficulty securing funding from the Canada Council for the Arts. Their status is comparable to that of "regional" writers in Quebec. New Brunswick has the highest concentration of Acadians, but its government spends the least per capita on culture. New Brunswick has had a book policy since 2008, but its limited budget makes it difficult to implement.

=== Censorship ===
According to David Lonergan, the New Brunswick government's political correctness sometimes borders on "stupidity".

=== Publication and distribution ===
Éditions Perce-Neige was founded in Moncton in 1980 and was run by the poet Gérald Leblanc until he died in 2005. Representing the "Moncton school", the company publishes mainly new titles but also classics, averaging six to seven titles a year. It publishes the most poetry and the most contemporary fiction. Éditions La Grande Marée, the only publishing house outside Moncton, was founded in Tracadie-Sheila in 1994 by Jacques Ouellet. It publishes five or six titles a year in almost all genres and subjects, but its eclecticism and the poor quality of some of its texts have prevented it from gaining recognition. In 1996, the writer Marguerite Maillet founded the Bouton d'or Acadie, which specializes in children's books by Acadian and foreign authors. Respected for its graphic and literary quality, the dozen or so titles it publishes each year cover a wide range of interests but emphasize respect for others and the environment. Founded in 2001 by Denis Sonier, Éditions de la Francophonie publishes everything (except poetry and memoirs) as long as the text is well written, has commercial potential and the author is willing to share the financial risk. It markets itself to the community of authors and manages to be profitable; Louis Haché supports these practices, while David Lonergan doubts their usefulness beyond inflating authors' egos.

Bouton d'or Acadie and La grande Marée do not even have permanent staff, while Éditions de Grand-Pré only operates when its main volunteer, Professor Henri-Dominique Pratte, can take care of it. The first publisher, Éditions d'Acadie, went bankrupt in 2000. There are no more publishers of textbooks or academic works, except in some cases for the University of Moncton, which collaborates with the University of Poitiers. Nevertheless, it is easy to publish a book, and it seems, according to David Lonergan, that a book published in Acadia sells proportionally better than one sold in another province. Nevertheless, the practices and financial capacity of Acadian publishers have led several authors, including Herménégilde Chiasson, France Daigle, and Claude Le Bouthillier, to seek publication in Quebec. Others, such as Antonine Maillet, did so simply because there were no publishers at the time of their writing.

Acadian artists often struggle to get attention in the mainstream media. According to Anne Compton, this problem affects all artists from the Atlantic provinces. The weakness of Acadian publishing and the small population of Acadia hinder the dissemination of Acadian literature, whether in the rest of Canada or abroad. Quebec nationalism sometimes has the effect of overshadowing francophone artists from outside Quebec.

In Quebec, there is no cultural magazine like Liaison, no arts journal, and no free cultural periodical. L'Acadie nouvelle and Radio-Canada announce some publications, but often with a short commentary or an interview with the author. Several Acadian authors are published in Ontario, but the newspaper Le Droit devotes little space to literature. Quebec dailies also devote little space to Acadian literature. Daniel Lessard also complains that journalists are more interested in the author's background than in the work itself and that historical fiction and poetry are neglected. The magazine Éloizes was founded in 1980 but disappeared in 2003. It was replaced in 2005 by Ancrages, which ceased publication in 2007, although a new issue was published in 2012.

There are only a few bookstores, mostly near the Université de Moncton campuses (Edmundston, Moncton, and Shippagan) with a few more in towns like Caraquet and Tracadie-Sheila since the 2000s. The New Brunswick government does not fund these enterprises and there is no institutional policy for local purchasing.

In 2020, Éditions Bouton d'or Acadie will launch Mouton Noir Acadie, which will publish literature outside the field of children's literature.

== See also ==
- Francophone literature
- Acadian culture
- Acadian Renaissance
- Religion in Acadia
- Acadian cinema
- Literature of Nova Scotia

== Bibliography ==
- Doyon-Gosselin, Benoit (7 February 2022). "Survol de la littérature acadienne". Revue Les libraires (in French).
- "Acadian Literature". The Canadian Encyclopedia.

=== Specialist publications ===
- Boudreau, Raoul; Maillet, Marguerite (1993). "Littérature acadienne". L'Acadie des Maritimes (in French). Moncton: Centre d'études acadiennes Anselme-Chiasson. pp. 707–750. ISBN 2921166062.
- Gallant, Janine; Raymond, Maurice (2012). Dictionnaire des œuvres littéraires de l'Acadie des maritimes du XXe siècle (in French). Sudbury: Prise de parole. ISBN 978-2-89423-241-5.
- Lonergan, David (2008). Tintamarre : chroniques de littérature dans l'Acadie d'aujourd'hui (in French). Sudbury: Prise de Parole. ISBN 978-2-89423-212-5.
- Lonergan, David (2010). Paroles d'Acadie : Anthologie de la littérature acadienne (1958-2009) (in French). Sudbury: Prise de Parole. ISBN 978-2-89423-256-9.
- Maillet, Marguerite (1983). Histoire de la littérature acadienne : de rêve en rêve (in French). Moncton: Éditions d'Acadie.
- Viau, Robert (2006). "L'épée et la plume: La persistance du thème de la Déportation acadienne en littérature". Acadiensis (in French). XXXVI (1). Archived from the original on 7 October 2024.

=== Other publications ===
- Chiasson, Zénon (1993). "L'institution théâtrale acadienne". L'Acadie des Maritimes (in French). Moncton: Centre d'études acadiennes Anselme-Chiasson. pp. 789–844. ISBN 2921166062.
