= Perce-Neige Publishing =

Acadian publishing house

Éditions Perce-Neige
- Type: Non-profit organization
- Industry: Publishing
- Founded: 1980
- Founder: Association des écrivains acadiens
- Headquarters: Moncton, New Brunswick
- Area served: Francophonie, Maritime Provinces
- Key people: Danielle LeBlanc (General Manager); Émilie Turmel (Literary Director)
- Products: Poetry, prose, drama, essays
- Website: editionsperceneige.ca

The Perce-Neige Publishing (Éditions Perce-Neige) is an Acadian publishing house founded in 1980 and based in Moncton, New Brunswick. It publishes French-language literature about the Atlantic region. As a non-profit organization, it seeks to promote Acadian literature in the Maritime Provinces and preserve Acadian literary heritage.

The publisher is a member of several professional organizations, including the Association nationale des éditeurs de livres (ANEL), the Regroupement des éditeurs franco-canadiens (REFC), and the Réseau des arts de la parole et des arts et initiatives littéraires (RAPAIL).

== History ==
Founded in 1980 by the Association of Acadian Writers, Éditions Perce-Neige focuses primarily on poetry, while also maintaining collections in prose, theatre, and essays. The house publishes authors from Atlantic Canada and Louisiana. Originally a cooperative, it transitioned to a non-profit status in 1986 under the leadership of four poets: Herménégilde Chiasson, Rose Després, Gérald Leblanc, and Dyane Léger. Following a period of inactivity, the house was relaunched in 1990 by young poets Fredric Gary Comeau and Jean-Philippe Raîche.

Gérald Leblanc served as director from 1992 until 2005. Under his mentorship, the press published a new wave of poets, including Paul Bossé, Sarah Marylou Brideau, and Fredric Gary Comeau. This generation became known as the "Aberdeen School," named after the Aberdeen Cultural Centre in Moncton where the publisher was then located. The offices have since moved to the Maison du Commerce on St-George Street.

Serge Patrice Thibodeau took over literary direction in 2005, serving until 2023. During his tenure, the organization underwent a process of professionalization, focusing on continuing education for the editorial team and expanding the catalog to include diverse voices such as Georgette LeBlanc, Gabriel Robichaud, and Sébastien Bérubé. Thibodeau was credited with increasing the representation of women, Indigenous authors, and writers from remote regions like Madawaska and Louisiana.

In March 2023, Émilie Turmel was appointed literary director, becoming the first woman to hold the position. Following Thibodeau's departure as general manager in late 2023, Danielle LeBlanc assumed leadership of the organization in March 2024.

== Collections ==
- Poetry: Managed by Émilie Turmel and Jonathan Roy, this is the publisher's flagship collection.
- Theatre: Established in 2020 under the direction of Gabriel Robichaud, launched with Caroline Bélisle's play Diner pour deux.
- Essays and documents: Directed by Pénélope Cormier and Julien Massicotte, focusing on non-fiction and intellectual works.
- Prose: Managed by Marilou Potvin-Lajoie and Louis-Martin Savard, encompassing novels, short stories, and narratives.
- Memoir: Directed by Serge Patrice Thibodeau, dedicated to preserving works of Acadian literary heritage.

== Notable authors ==
- Guy Arsenault
- Herménégilde Chiasson
- France Daigle
- Léonard Forest
- Hélène Harbec
- Gérald Leblanc
- Georgette LeBlanc
- Raymond Guy LeBlanc
- Daniel Léger
- Viola Léger
- Serge Patrice Thibodeau

== Literary directors ==
- 1991–2005: Gérald Leblanc
- 2007–2023: Serge Patrice Thibodeau
- 2023–present: Émilie Turmel

== See also ==
- Governor General's Awards
