= Phil Comeau =

Canadian film and television director

Phil Comeau CM ONB ONS
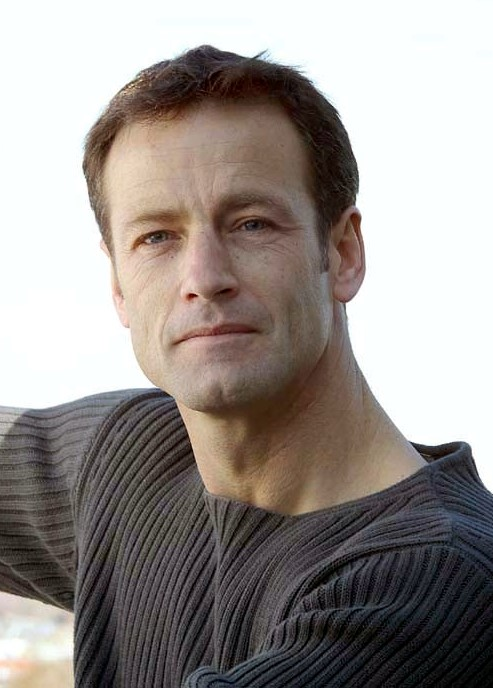
- Born: Saulnierville, Nova Scotia, Canada
- Years active: 1977–present
- Notable work: Jerome's Secret

Phil Comeau CM ONB ONS is a Canadian film and television director, best known for his work in both dramatic and documentary cinema. His work in Acadian and Canadian filmmaking has been recognized internationally, having received over 700 awards at film festivals around the world. He resides in both Moncton, New Brunswick and Montreal, Quebec.

== Career ==
Filmmaker Comeau has directed and written numerous feature films in both drama and documentary, and television series in more than 20 countries. Some of his work has been translated into 27 languages and broadcast in nearly 190 countries.

=== Drama ===
He directed and co-wrote the award-winning feature Jerome's Secret, the first independent Acadian dramatic feature film (Canada), and two TV movies Crash of the Century (France), and Teen Knight (Romania and the USA).

His credits in television drama include Tribu.com (I & II), which garnered up to 1.3 million viewers in Quebec, La Sagouine, Lassie, Emily of New Moon, Pit Pony, Les couleurs de mon accent, World Legends.

=== Documentary and docu-drama ===
Comeau's recent award-winning feature documentaries include The Secret Order, Zachary Richard Cajun Heart, Acadian Music Wave, Secretariat's Jockey Ron Turcotte, and The Nature of Frederic Back.

He has also directed many documentary series, including Risk Takers, Archeology, Walk on the Wild Side, and the docu-drama series Mayday, broadcast worldwide.

=== Acadian films ===
Almost half of Phil Comeau's films are about his Acadian culture. Among them, the feature film Jerome's Secret, the first Acadian comedy The Gossips, the first Acadian children's film The Hooked Rug of Grand-Pré, a popular series remake on an iconic Acadian character La Sagouine, and a film on Acadian woman fishermen Women Captains.

On the subject of the world Acadian diaspora, he had directed an Acadian feature in Louisiana Zachary Richard, Cajun Heart, a documentary series in Quebec Les Acadiens du Québec and documentaries in the Acadian areas of France Roots, Diaspora & War and Belle-Ile-en-Mer, a Breton and Acadian Island. His short film Belle-Île in Acadie currently holds the Guinness World Record for "Most awards won by a documentary short film," with 458 accolades worldwide.

The Secret Order (L'Ordre secret) won the "People's choice award" in 2022 at the Festival international du cinéma francophone en Acadie (FICFA). Roots, Diaspora & War (Racines, diaspora & guerre) won the same award in 2023 and has received 128 international awards.

=== Literary work ===
Comeau has participated in two poetry collections Plumes d'icitte and Éloizes, published his film script Les Gossipeuses, and a dictionary of Acadian French Le parler Acadjonne. He co-directed and edited the anthology Acadie Then and Now, a 500-page collection of historical and contemporary writings on the Acadian diaspora. The anthology received the Prix France-Acadie in Paris (2015).

== Personal life ==
Phil Comeau was born in Saulnierville, Nova Scotia. His background has influenced his artistic work, which often explores Acadian culture, history, and identity.

== Recognitions ==
Comeau has received six orders: Order of Canada in 2011; the Order of New Brunswick in 2016, the Order of Nova Scotia in 2023 and the Ordre de la Pléiade from the French Assembly of Parlementarians in 2016; the distinction of the Ordre des francophones d'Amérique at the National Assembly in Quebec in 2007; and was promoted to the rank of "Officer" of the Ordre des Arts et des Lettres in France in 2022. He also received two Honorary Doctorats in Arts from the Université de Moncton, N.B. (2013) and from Université Sainte-Anne in N.S. (2007); the Prix Meritas of the Federation acadienne du Quebec in 1999; the Grand-Pre Award from the Minister of Culture of Nova Scotia in 1997, and the Prix Champion in Ottawa in 1995. His feature film Zachary Richard, Cajun Heart was presented at the United Nations in Geneva in 2017. In 2021, Comeau was awarded the Médaille Léger-Comeau, the highest Acadian distinction by the Société Nationale de l'Acadie. In 2024, Comeau received the Lieutenant Governor's Awards for High Achievement in the Arts.

== Filmography ==
=== As director ===
- 1977: La cabane
- 1978: The Gossips (Les gossipeuses)
- 1979: La mer enligne nos terres
- 1980: Notre côte
- 1982: J'avions 375 ans
- 1982: Knock on Wood (Touchons du bois)
- 1983: South-West Nova (A l'image de la mer)
- 1984: La musique nous explique
- 1984: No Easy Passage
- 1985: Colds (Rhumes)
- 1986: The Hooked Rug of Grand-Pré (Le tapis de Grand-Pré)
- 1987: Le deuxième souffle
- 1987: Le creux de la vague
- 1990: La meteo de la mer
- 1991: Au mitan des iles
- 1992: The Art of the Street Performer
- 1993: Paleo World
- 1993: Archeology
- 1993: The Sphinx
- 1993: Hitler's Conspiracy
- 1993: Petra, the Red City
- 1993: In Search of the Neanderthal
- 1993: Who was Cleopatra?
- 1993: Caesar's Nightmare
- 1993: Macedonia
- 1993: A City in the Clouds
- 1994: Jerome's Secret (Le secret de Jérôme)
- 1995: The New Detectives
- 1996: Lassie
- 1998: Teen Knight
- 1998: Emily of New Moon (Émilie de Nouvelle-Lune)
- 1999: Walk on the Wild Side! (Quelle aventure!)
- 2000: Pit Pony
- 2001: Chopin: Frederic and Georges (Chopin: Frédéric et Georges)
- 2001: Tribu.com I
- 2002: Tall Ship Chronicles
- 2002: Tribu.com II
- 2003: Barney & Clyde (Bernard et Claude)
- 2003: Les couleurs de mon accent
- 2004: Mayday II (Air Emergency) (Dangers dans les airs II)
- 2005: Mayday III (Air Emergency) (Dangers dans les airs III)
- 2005: The Crash of the Century (Le crash du siècle)
- 2006: La Sagouine
- 2007: Risk Takers
- 2008: Stunt Stars
- 2009: Nature Above All (La nature avant tout)
- 2011: Les Acadiens du Québec, avec Fred Pellerin
- 2012: The Nature of Frederic Back (Frederic Back, grandeur nature)
- 2013: Secretariat's Jockey, Ron Turcotte (Ron Turcotte, jockey légendaire)
- 2015: J'habite ici, au bord de l'eau
- 2016: Cousins, cousines de la Louisiane
- 2016: Belle-Ile-en-Mer, a Breton and Acadian Island (Belle-Île-en-Mer, île bretonne et acadienne)
- 2016: Zachary Richard, Cajun Heart (Zachary Richard, toujours batailleur)
- 2018: Acadian Music Wave (Vague d'Acadie)
- 2019: Belle-Ile in Acadie (Belle-Île en Acadie)
- 2021: Women Captains (Femmes capitaines)
- 2022: The Secret Order (L'Ordre secret)
- 2023: Roots, Diaspora & War (Racines, diaspora & guerre)
- 2025: Acadian Resonance (Résonance Acadie)

=== As writer ===
- 1977: La cabane (drama)
- 1978: The Gossips (drama)
- 1979: La mer enligne nos terres (experimental)
- 1980: Notre côte (TV series)
- 1980: La musique nous explique (documentary)
- 1982: J'avions 375 ans (documentary)
- 1982: Knock on Wood (TV series)
- 1983: À l'image de la mer (documentary)
- 1984: No Easy Passage (drama)
- 1986: The Hooked Rug of Grand-Pre (drama)
- 1987: Le deuxième souffle (documentary)
- 1987: Le creux de la vague (documentary)
- 1991: Au mitan des îles (documentary)
- 1992: Archeology (TV series)
- 1994: Jerome's Secret (feature-length drama)
- 1999: Walk on the Wild Side! (TV series)
- 2002: Tall Ship Chronicles (TV series)
- 2004: Mayday II (TV series, docu-drama)
- 2006: La Sagouine (TV drama series)
- 2007: Risk Takers (TV series)
- 2008: Stunt Stars (TV series)
- 2009: Nature Above All (documentary)
- 2011: Frederic Back, Grandeur Nature (feature-length documentary)
- 2012: Secretariat's Jockey, Ron Turcotte (feature-length documentary)
- 2015: Cousins, cousines de la Louisiane (web series)
- 2015: Zachary Richard, Cajun Heart / Zachary Richard, toujours batailleur (feature-length documentary)
- 2016: Belle-Île-en-Mer, île bretonne et acadienne (documentary)
- 2017: Acadian Music Wave / Vague d'Acadie (TV series & feature length doc)
- 2018: Heritage Minute - Expulsion of the Acadians (drama)
- 2019: Belle-Ile in Acadie / Belle-Île en Acadie (documentary)
- 2020: The Secret Order / L'Ordre secret (feature docu-drama)
- 2021: Women Captains / Femmes capitaines (documentary)
- 2022: Roots, diaspora and war / Racines, diaspora et guerre (documentary)
- 2025: Acadian Resonance / Résonance Acadie (documentary)

=== As producer or coproducer ===
- 1980: Notre côte (TV documentary series)
- 1980: La musique nous explique (documentary)
- 1994: Jerome's Secret (feature drama film)
- 2016: Belle-Île-en-Mer, île bretonne et acadienne (documentary)
- 2019: Belle-Ile in Acadie / Belle-Île en Acadie (documentary)
- 2023: Roots, diaspora and war / Racine, diaspora & guerre (documentary)
- 2025: Acadian Resonance / Résonance Acadie (documentary)

== Honours ==
- 2025: Tribute Prize/Prix hommage - Fédération acadienne du Québec (Montréal)
- 2024: Compagnie des Cent-associés francophones (ACELF, Canada)
- 2024: Lieutenant-Governor's Award for High Achievement in the Arts (Fredericton, New Brunswick)
- 2024: PRIX L'OEIL DU FRIC (Front des réalisateurs indépendants du Canada) (Toronto)
- 2023: GUINNESS World Record for Most Awards Won by a Short Documentary Film (London, England)
- 2023: Order of Nova Scotia (Halifax, Nova Scotia)
- 2022: Officier - Ordre des Arts et Lettres (Paris, France)
- 2022: Queen Elizabeth II's Platinum Jubilee Medal
- 2021: Médaille Léger-Comeau, the highest Acadian distinction awarded by the Société Nationale de l'Acadie
- 2020: Prix Louisiane-Acadie - 15th Cinema Festival on the Bayou (Lafayette, Louisiana)
- 2019: Médaille de la Ville de Marennes -10th Festival of Francophone Culture (Marennes, France)
- 2019: The Canadian Encyclopedia (Historica Canada), Inclusion on list of 30 Famous Francophones in Canada
- 2018: Prix Eloize, Acadian Artist Most Illustrated Internationally (New Brunswick, Canada)
- 2018: Prix du public Radio-Canada / People's Choice for Acadian Artist of the Year (New Brunswick, Canada)
- 2018: Prix du President, Richelieu International (Canada)
- 2017: The Canadian Encyclopedia (Historica Canada), Inclusion of biography (Canada)
- 2017: United Nations, Presentation of his film "Zachary Richard Cajun Heart" (Geneva, Switzerland)
- 2016: Cultural Personality of the Year, Acadie-Nouvelle (New Brunswick, Canada)
- 2016: Order of New Brunswick, Gouvernment of New Brunswick (Canada)
- 2016: Order of La Pléiade, Assemblée Parlementaire de la Francophonie (OIF, International)
- 2015: Prix France-Acadie Award, Amitiés France-Acadie (Paris, France)
- 2014: Personality of the week, Radio-Canada & Acadie-Nouvelle (Maritimes, Canada)
- 2014: Prix Acadie-Québec Award, Bureau atlantique du Quebec & Société national de l'Acadie (New Brunswick, Canada)
- 2014: Certificat de mérite, Fédération acadienne de la Nouvelle-Écosse, Halifax (Nova Scotia, Canada)
- 2014: Film Retrospective Phil Comeau, 6 films (Lafayette, Louisiana)
- 2013: Honorary Doctorat in Arts, Université de Moncton (New Brunswick, Canada)
- 2012: Queen Elizabeth II Diamond Jubilee Medal (Ottawa, Canada)
- 2011: Order of Canada (Ottawa)
- 2007: Honorary Doctorat in Fine-Arts, Université Sainte-Anne (Nova Scotia, Canada)
- 2007: Ordre des francophones d'Amérique (Quebec, Canada)
- 2006: Chevalier - Ordre des Arts et Lettres (Paris, France)
- 1999: Prix Méritas Award, Federation acadienne du Québec (Montréal, Canada)
- 1997: Prix Grand-Pré Award, Halifax (Nova Scotia, Canada)
- 1995: Prix Champion, Fédération culturelle canadienne-française (Ottawa, Canada)
