= Melvin Gallant =

Canadian literary figure (1932–2023)

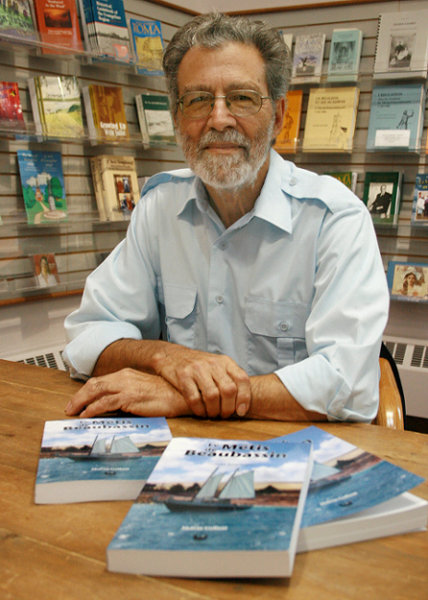
- Born: Urbainville, Île-du-Prince-Édouard, Canada; 24 May 1932
- Died: 20 October 2023 (aged 91)

Melvin Gallant (May 24, 1932 – October 20, 2023) was a Canadian teacher, literary critic, editor and writer.

Born in Prince Edward Island, Gallant began his academic journey at Collège Saint-Joseph in Memramcook. From 1957 to 1960, he taught economics and accounting from 1957 to 1960 at Collège Sacré-Cœur in Bathurst. He left to study in Europe, earning a degree in political science from the University of Paris in 1960 and a Master of Arts from the Institut catholique de Paris in 1964. That same year, he began teaching French and Acadian literature at the Université de Moncton. His doctoral thesis, presented in 1970 at the University of Neuchâtel, Le Thème de la mort chez Roger Martin du Gard, was widely acclaimed.

Gallant co-founded Éditions d'Acadie in 1972. At the time, it was the largest French-language publishing house in North America outside Quebec. He was president until 1975, then chairman of the board and president of the executive committee from 1977 to 1984. In 1978, he also founded the Association des écrivains acadiens, which gave birth to Éditions Perce-Neige in 1980. The same year, he founded the political analysis magazine Égalité.

He published several novels, including some fifteen for children. Renowned for his Ti-Jean series, he stands out as the most celebrated Acadian children's author. Ti-Jean, inspired by a character from Acadian folklore, versions of which are also found in different cultures. In 1999, he created a female version of the character, Tite-Jeanne. Éditions d'Acadie closed its doors in 2000, and Gallant decided to publish new versions of Ti-Jean, this time with Bouton d'or Acadie. His other works include the documentary La Cuisine traditionnelle en Acadie, co-written in 1975 with Marielle Boudreau, the poetry collection L'Été insulaire (1982) and the historical novel Le Métis de Beaubassin (2009). The latter is the first book published by Éditions de la Francophonie. Melvin Gallant also publishes reviews, manuals and articles.

== Biography ==
=== Youth and education ===
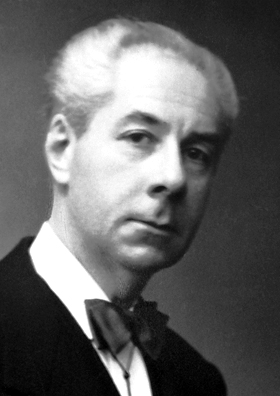
Roger Martin du Gard, whose work is the subject of Melvin Gallant's doctoral thesis, defended in 1970.

Melvin Gallant was born on May 24, 1932 - other sources mention 1933 - in Urbainville, in the Evangeline region of western Prince Edward Island, Canada. One of his ancestors is Michel Haché dit Gallant, the main character in his novel Le Métis de Beaubassin, published in 2009. He was secretary of the International Association of Haché-Gallant Families from 2002 to 2005. The origin of the Gallant surname, originally an Acadian nickname for the ancestor, is not known, but Melvin invents one in his novel. Melvin was nicknamed the "Métis of Urbainville" because his ancestor was a Métis born of an Acadian father and an Aboriginal mother.

After completing high school in Prince Edward Island, he entered Université Saint-Joseph in Memramcook, neighboring New Brunswick, where he graduated in 1956 with a Bachelor of Commerce. Between 1957 and 1960, he taught economics and accounting at Collège Sacré-Cœur in Bathurst. He then went to France, where he obtained a degree in political science from the University of Paris in 1960 and a Master of Arts from the Institut Catholique de Paris in 1964.

He also prepared a doctoral thesis, Le Thème de la mort chez Roger Martin du Gard, which he defended at the University of Neuchâtel, Switzerland, in 1970. His thesis was published the following year by Klincksieck, Paris. Réjean Robidoux praised the thesis's "solidity and accuracy", as well as its "synthetic" and "exhaustive" character". During his studies, Gallant received grants from the French and Swiss governments, as well as from the Canada Council for the Arts. From 1974 to 1976, he was a member of the jury for the Canada Council's artists' bursaries, then president from 1977 to 1979.

He spent time in ten European countries and three in Africa.

=== Teaching ===
In 1964, Gallant left to teach French and Acadian literature at the new Université de Moncton in New Brunswick. He published a textbook, L'Initiation à la dissertation, in 1966, as well as several studies and articles. He was a founding member of the university's professors' association in 1964, and its secretary until 1969. He also headed the French Studies Department from 1969 to 1973 and chaired the Comité d'équivalence entre les universités francophones from 1971 to 1975.

Following a poetry contest launched in 1971 by master's students at the Université de Moncton, Gallant brought together a number of authors to found Éditions d'Acadie the following year. He was president until 1975, then chairman of the board and president of the executive committee from 1977 to 1984. Under his leadership, Éditions d'Acadie became the largest French-language publishing house on the American continent outside Quebec until its closure in 2000. In 1978, he also founded the Association des écrivains acadiens, which gave birth to Éditions Perce-Neige in 1980. He founded the political analysis magazine Égalité the same year.

He chaired presentations and sessions on French and Acadian literature at various symposia held in Belgium, Canada and France. In 1988, he co-chaired a citizens' committee calling for the survival of the daily newspaper Le Matin. He was also chairman of the organizing committee for the Colloque international sur le thème de la mer in 1991.

=== Retirement ===
Gallant retired from the Université de Moncton in 1993. He was named professor emeritus of literature shortly thereafter. After retirement, he lived six months a year in Grand-Barachois, Beaubassin-Est, New Brunswick, and six months in the Dominican Republic. He also lived in Martinique.

He continued to write, however, and was also a cultural animator. He was honorary president of the Salon du livre de Dieppe in 2001 and a member of the Board of Directors until 2005.

=== Death ===
Gallant died on October 20, 2023.

== Writing ==
According to David Lonergan, Gallant's work is inseparable from the emergence of Acadian literature. His children's stories and novels are the most popular in Acadian literature, with a total of 18,450 copies sold by 1995.

According to the Dictionnaire des auteurs de langue française en Amérique du Nord, Gallant's work focuses on the soul and life of his homeland, Acadia. His interest in history stems from his search for his origins and his desire to better understand contemporary Acadia.

His works are often the fruit of a desire for renewal in Acadian literature. Ti-Jean (1973) is the first collection of stories that is not purely ethnological, L'Été insulaire (1982) is the first collection of poetry that does not limit itself to identity, and Le Chant des grenouilles (1982) is one of the first psychological novels. In 1999, with the publication of Tite-Jeanne, he renewed his own work, as this female character acts as a counterweight to the male character of Ti-Jean. However, the publication of Gallant's tales helped to make traditional stories more accessible.

=== Ti-Jean: contes acadiens ===
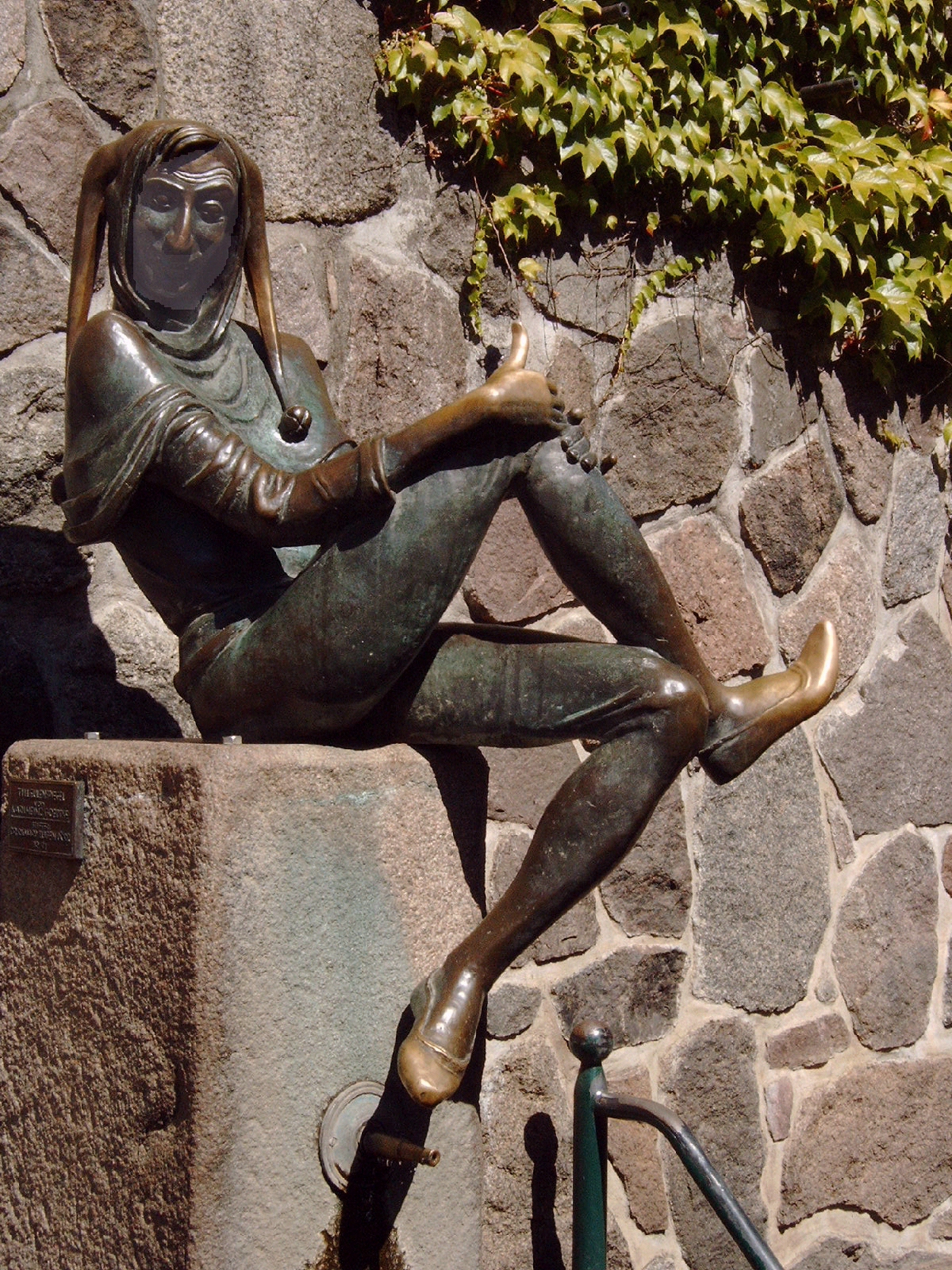
Statue of Till L'Espiègle, another name given to Ti-Jean.

In 1973, Gallant published Ti-Jean: contes acadiens with Éditions d'Acadie. While inspired by Acadian folklore, this collection of tales has a universal appeal. In fact, it's an Acadian version of a very common tale, found under that name in Quebec, Louisiana and the West Indies, as well as under the name Till l'Espiègle in Germany and Ian Beg in Scotland. Aimed at ten- to fourteen-year-olds, it was the first in a series of publications centered on the eponymous character, an honest and courageous boy who sets off on adventures to save princesses in danger and fight evil beings. In Acadian folklore, several tales feature a character usually called Ti-Jean, hired by a king to perform various tasks, making him a standard tale AT 1000 to 1029 in the Aarne-Thompson classification. In the Acadian version, the king replaces the character of the stupid ogre found in other cultures. Ti-Jean is also the main character in the tale "Le Fin-Voleur" (standard tale AT 1525), one of the most popular in Acadian folklore, in which he accomplishes daring thefts.

The author claims to have been inspired by the "liveliness" of Honoré Saint-Pierre's texts in adapting these tales. He doesn't lapse into the picturesque like many other storytellers, and uses simple language and neutral writing, a little "gray" according to Alain Masson, contrasting with the mischievous character of the main character. In Acadian French, there is no oral negation "ne... pas", but the author uses it because he decides not to recreate oral discourse, as is often the case in storytelling. He does, however, use superlatives. The tales are written in the simple past tense, common in Acadian stories, rather than the compound past tense usually used in Acadian fictions of the period. There are no Acadianisms or anglicisms. Alain Masson does note, however, the use of the word "piastre" and "dollar", thus constituting a slip of the tongue.

The simplicity of the language does, however, enhance the structure of the tale itself, and brings us closer to the character functions theorized by Russian author Vladimir Propp, who determined that all tales have the same basic structure, comprising seven types of characters and 31 functions corresponding to the breakdown of the narrative. In fact, Acadian tales are similar to European tales in structure, but differ in detail. Daniel Long even compares Ti-Jean's tales to the Odyssey. The sea is omnipresent, a characteristic feature of Acadian culture. Another example of Acadian influence is the fact that the king is always a rich farmer. Ti-Jean is a marvelous tale, as evidenced by the magical machines and the fact that all the animals are endowed with powers. Ti-Jean has no powers, but he uses magical objects. The tales are inspired by oral tradition, often beginning with a transgressed impediment, as when Ti-Jean goes off on an adventure of his own free will to help a family member.

The tales are not organized haphazardly, but according to a pedagogical, even initiatory, order. The author uses the traditional structure of characters - kings, sorcerers and princesses - and the triple repetition of narrative elements. The last tale, La Quarantième chambre et les quatre murs (The Fortieth Chamber and the Four Walls), may allude to Ti-Jean's four journeys, which in fact include three stages: two returns to his parents' home, one missing from the story and three "safe" arrivals, thus repeating the triple repetition. What's more, the wicked Baron finds the fourth wall daubed; the fourth in the collection is thus different, marking the end of the story.

All the women described, except the witches, are princesses, and Ti-Jean seduces several of them in the course of the story. He is driven more by desire than love, as demonstrated by his description of the discovery of the naked princess in the last tale. For him, however, family values outweigh love values: he marries in the Merlin tale, but finds it harder to win recognition from the king, the father figure, than he does his daughter's hand in marriage. He even declares that he'd rather join his parents than marry. In fact, Ti-Jean is attached to childish values and has many scruples. He is very attached to old men, especially sorcerers and fairies, who give him gifts of magical objects.

Ti-Jean: contes acadiens sold 9,500 copies before 1995, a record for an Acadian children's book; a new edition was published in 1984. The collection is included in the curriculum of some Acadian schools. Gallant published a second collection, Ti-Jean-le-Fort, in 1991.

=== Miscellaneous texts ===
Working with Marielle Boudreau, Gallant completes La Cuisine traditionnelle en Acadie in 1975, a book of 175 recipes. It was the first published work on the subject and the most comprehensive to date. According to David Lonergan, it is probably the best-selling book ever published in Acadia.

Le Pays d'Acadie, published in 1982, is a text and photo album about Acadians, their environment, economy and leisure activities. It also summarizes the history of Acadia, while situating it in the contemporary political and linguistic context. According to Jean Royer, the book is "not faked", and Natania Étienne believes it "goes beyond the picturesque". David Lonergan disagrees, considering it more like a tourist guide. However, according to Michael O. Nowlan, the author demonstrates the contribution of the Acadians despite their rejection throughout history.

L'Été insulaire is the only collection of poetry completed by Gallant, in 1982. Set in Greece, its theme is the imprint of a wounded mad love.

In another first for Acadian literature, Gallant used his photographs to embellish Caprice à la campagne (1982) and Caprice en hiver (1984), collections inspired by his cat Caprice. Both volumes have been translated into English, and the author has promised a sequel.

In 1983, Gallant and Ginette Gould completed Portrait d'écrivain, a biographical dictionary of eighty-three Acadian authors, with excerpts from their works. This is the first dictionary of Acadian authors and was a reference work in the 1980s, but is now obsolete, as the authors themselves admit.

His novel Le Chant des grenouilles won him the Prix France-Acadie in 1983. It tells the story of Michel, a twenty-two-year-old man suffering from an incurable disease who decides to live out his last years to the full.

In 1985, the Société historique acadienne published a new edition of Dière de Dièreville's account of his travels in Acadia from 1699 to 1670, with an introduction and annotations by Melvin Gallant. This text, while not very original, is, according to John A. Dickinson, a "very perceptive" account of Acadia at the turn of the eighteenth century.

His novel Le Complexe d'Évangéline, completed in 2001, updates the Évangéline myth by attempting to find an end to it; the quest of Nathalie, the heroine, is above all a metaphor for the affirmation of modernity. The poem Evangeline, though written by American Henry Longfellow, had a fundamental influence on Acadian culture and renaissance in the 19th century. Gallant is the first author to be published by Éditions de la Francophonie, lending credibility to the house.

The author began a new series of three collections, Tite-Jeanne, in 1999. The author wanted to explore the traditional tale with a female character. They are in fact retellings of Ti-Jean, with the same themes, but with the prince playing the role of the princess in Ti-Jean. David Lornergan considers the best of the series to be Tite-Jeanne et le Prince Igor, the third collection.

Since then, his tales have been published by Bouton d'or Acadie, with the exception of Patrick l'Internaute, published in 2003 by Chenelière Éducation.

In 2011, he wrote the tale Cendrillouse, Cendrillon acadienne, in the volume Cendrillon de quatre continents. Cendrillouse, or Souillon, is the name given to Cinderella in Acadia.

=== New version of Ti-Jean ===
Éditions d'Acadie closed its doors in 2000, creating a shortage of the two Ti-Jean collections. In response to popular demand, the stories were republished by Bouton d'or Acadie under the titles Ti-Jean-le-Brave (2005), Ti-Jean-le-Rusé (2006), Ti-Jean-l'intrépide (2007) and Ti-Jean-Tête-D'Or (2010). The author uses the original tales, with a few modifications, and adds new texts. Ti-Jean-le-Rusé won him the Hackmattack Prize in 2006.

Ti-Jean-le-Brave comprises five stories. According to Daniel Marchildon, the best are Bonnet Rouge and Belle aurore soleil, in which Ti-Jean goes on a quest to find characters. He also feels that Le Violon du géant and Le Géant qui devvorait des jeunes filles contain too many elements in too few pages. He does, however, feel that the author uses colorful imagery and precise vocabulary. Yves Cormier calls it a beautiful collection.

The tales in Ti-Jean-l'intrépide are longer than those in Ti-Jean: contes acadiens, with more secondary events weighing down the text. According to Daniel Long, Ti-Jean-l'intrépide suffers from a lack of narrative rigor and an overly neutral style, probably caused by "hasty writing", leading to abrupt endings, omissions and incomplete descriptions. Nevertheless, the presentation of these collections remains accessible, although Michel Duguay's illustrations could have been better reproduced, according to Daniel Long and Daniel Marchildon.

Ti-Jean-Tête-D'Or comprises five stories. According to Michèle LeBlanc, they have abrupt endings, which may discourage some readers.

=== Le Métis de Beaubassin and À la conquête de l'île Saint-Jean ===
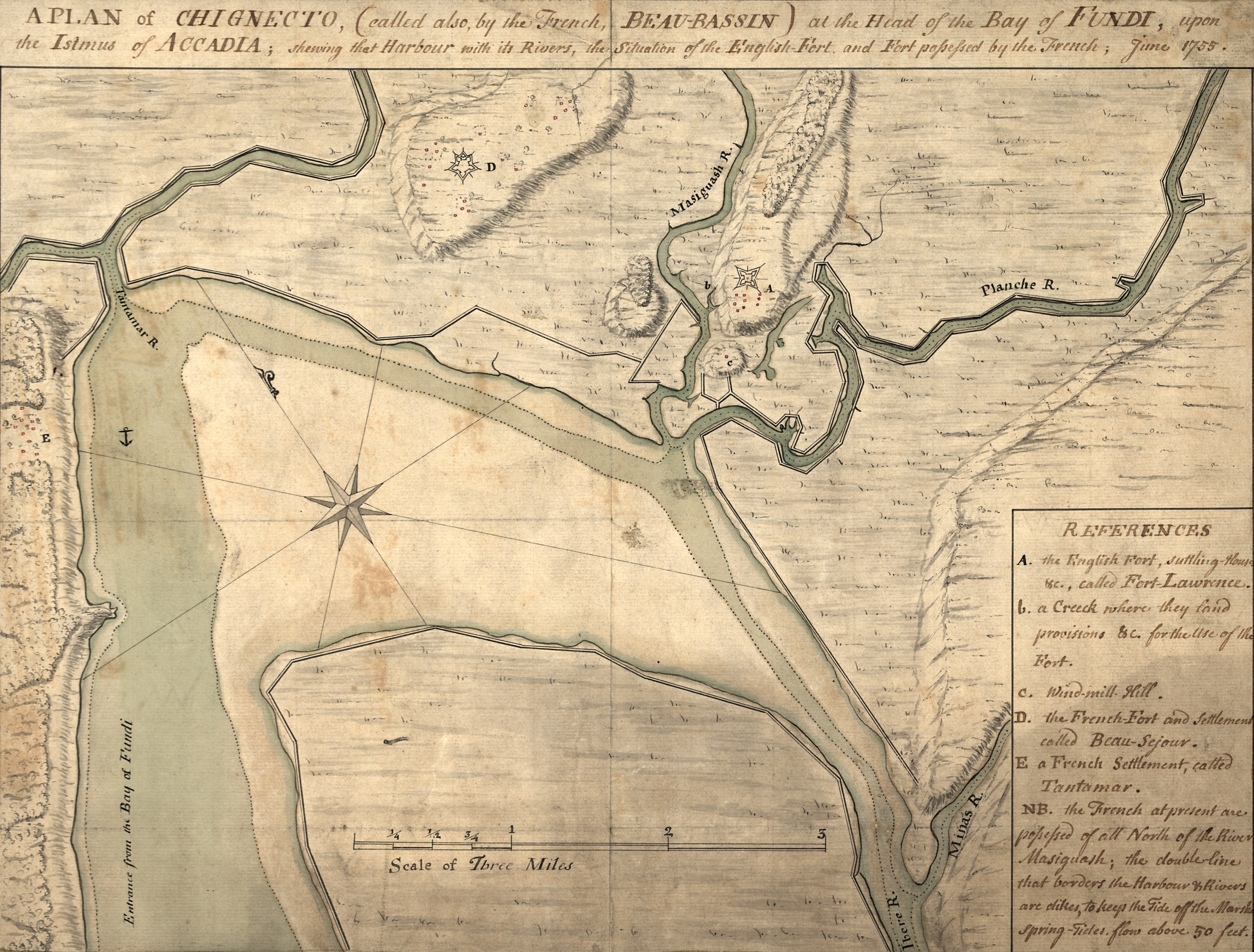
1755 map of Beaubassin, the setting for the novel Le Métis de Beaubassin (2009).

In 2009, Gallant published Le Métis de Beaubassin, which he considers his best work. This novel, the result of three years of meticulous research, explores the history of the village of Beaubassin, founded in 1677; its main character is the author's ancestor, Michel Haché dit Gallant (1663–1737), who was the right-hand man of seigneur Michel Leneuf de La Vallière and of Beaubassin. The novel ends in 1720, when the main character, tired of being pursued by the English, travels with his family to Île Saint-Jean, now Prince Edward Island. Gallant's novel unveils "less well-known aspects of Acadian life," including power struggles, everyday challenges, dike maintenance, witchcraft accusations, and conflicts with the English. This is one of the few published accounts of Beaubassin, one of the three main towns in historic Acadia, along with Port-Royal and Grand-Pré. The novel is praised by Georges Arsenault, Prince Edward Island's leading Acadian historian.

Gallant wrote a sequel, À la conquête de l'île Saint-Jean, which was published in 2016. The action takes place between 1720 and the start of the Deportation of Île Saint-Jean, an episode in the Deportation of the Acadians, in 1758.

== Awards ==
- 1983, Prix France-Acadie, for Le Chant des grenouilles
- 1983, Ordre des francophones d'Amérique
- 1985, Chevalier de l'Ordre des Palmes académiques
- 2006, Hackmatack Young People's Choice Award finalist, for Tite-Jeanne et la pomme d'or
- 2007, Prix Hackmatack - le choix des jeunes, for Ti-Jean-le-brave
- 2013, Lieutenant-Governor's Award for Excellence in French-language Literary Arts

== Works ==
=== Tales ===
- Melvin Gallant, "Bonnet Rouge", Écrits du Canada français, no. 38, 1974, pp. 124–134
- Melvin Gallant and Bernard Leblanc (illustrations), Ti-Jean, contes acadiens, Moncton, Éditions d'Acadie(repr. 1984, 1991) (1st ed. 1973), 248 p. (ISBN 978-2-7600-0183-1 and 2-7600-0183-0)
- Melvin Gallant, Caprice à la campagne, Moncton, Éditions d'Acadie, 1982, 15 p. (ISBN 2-7600-0081-8)
- Melvin Gallant, Caprice en hiver, Moncton, Éditions d'Acadie, 1984, 16 p. (ISBN 2-7600-0109-1)
- Melvin Gallant, Ti-Jean-le-fort: contes acadiens, Moncton, Éditions d'Acadie, 1991, 248 p.(ISBN 978-2-7600-0183-1)
- Melvin Gallant and Denise Paquette (illustrations), Tite-Jeanne et le prince triste, Moncton, Bouton d'or Acadie, 1999, 41 p. (ISBN 2-922203-23-9)
- Melvin Gallant and Denise Paquette (illustrations), Tite-Jeanne et la pomme d'or, Moncton, Bouton d'or Acadie, 2000, 78 p. (ISBN 2-922203-30-1)
- Melvin Gallant, Patrick l'Internaute, Montréal, Chenelière Éducation, 2003, 55 p. (ISBN 2-89461-776-3) Melvin Gallant and Denise Paquette (illustrations), Tite-Jeanne et le prince Igor, Moncton, Bouton d'or Acadie, 2004, 71 p. (ISBN 2-922203-56-5)
- Melvin Gallant and Michel Duguay (illustrations), Ti-Jean-le-Brave, Moncton, Bouton d'or Acadie, 2005, 187 p.(ISBN 2-922203-91-3)
- Melvin Gallant and Michel Duguay (illustrations), Ti-Jean-le-Rusé, Moncton, Bouton d'or Acadie, 2006, 217 p.(ISBN 2-923518-06-3)
- Melvin Gallant and Michel Duguay (illustrations), Ti-Jean-l'Intrépide, Moncton, Bouton d'or Acadie, 2007, 237 p.(ISBN 978-2-923518-22-0)
- Melvin Gallant, Ti-Jean-Tête-D'Or, Moncton, Bouton d'or Acadie, 2010, 198 p. (ISBN 978-2-923518-65-7)
- Melvin Gallant, "Cendrillouse, Cendrillon acadienne", in collective, Cendrillon de quatre continents, Moncton, Bouton d'or Acadie, 2011 (ISBN 978-2-923518-82-4)

=== Poems ===
- Melvin Gallant, L'Été insulaire: chant littéraire, Moncton, Éditions d'Acadie, 1982, 39 p. (ISBN 2-7600-0075-3)
- Melvin Gallant, "Variation saisonnières du pays, poèmes", Intervention à haute voix, no. 9, 1983, p. 24-32

=== Novels ===
- Melvin Gallant, Le Chant des grenouilles: roman, Moncton, Éditions d'Acadie, 1982, 157 p. (ISBN 2-7600-0083-4)
- Melvin Gallant, Le Complexe d'Évangéline: roman, Lévis, Éditions de la Francophonie, 2001, 241 p.(ISBN 2-9807136-0-0)
- Melvin Gallant, Le Métis de Beaubassin: roman historique, Lévis, Éditions de la Francophonie, 2009, 328 p.(ISBN 978-2-89627-192-4)
- Melvin Gallant, À la conquête de l'île Saint-Jean, Tracadie, La Grande marée, 2016, 213 p.(ISBN 978-2-349-72349-9)

=== News ===
- Melvin Gallant, "Le trou blanc", Éloizes, no. 1, Spring 1980 (ISSN 0228-0124)

=== Documentaries, manuals and theses ===
- Melvin Gallant, Initiation à la dissertation, Moncton, Librairie acadienne, Université de Moncton, 1966, 49 p.
- Melvin Gallant, Le Thème de la mort chez Roger Martin Du Gard, Paris, Klincksieck, 1971, 299 p.
- Marielle Cormier Boudreau and Melvin Gallant, La Cuisine traditionnelle en Acadie: historique des traditions et coutumes culinaires chez les Acadiens du Nouveau-Brunswick, de la Nouvelle-Écosse, de l'Île-du-Prince-Édouard et des Îles-de-la-Madeleine, Moncton, Éditions d'Acadie (repr. 1980, 1987) (1st ed. 1975), 181 p.
- Melvin Gallant, Le Pays d'Acadie, Moncton, Éditions d'Acadie, 1980, 206 p. (ISBN 2-7600-0051-6)
- Melvin Gallant and Ginette Gould, Portraits d'écrivains: dictionnaire des écrivains acadiens, Moncton, Éditions Perce-Neige, 1982, 180 p. (ISBN 2-7600-0071-0)
- Melvin Gallant (dir.) et al., Les Maritimes: trois provinces à découvrir, Moncton, Éditions d'Acadie, 1987, 420 p.(ISBN 2-7600-0148-2)
- Melvin Gallant (ed.), Mer et littérature: actes du Colloque international sur "La mer dans les littératures d'expression française du XXe siècle", Moncton, August 22–23–24, 1991, Moncton, Éditions d'Acadie, 1992, 352 p. (ISBN 2-7600-0217-9)
- Marielle Cormier Boudreau and Melvin Gallant, La Cuisine traditionnelle en Acadie: historique des traditions et coutumes culinaires chez les Acadiens du Nouveau-Brunswick, de la Nouvelle-Écosse, de l'Île-du-Prince-Édouard et des Îles-de-la-Madeleine, Lévis, Éditions de la Francophonie, 2002, 181 p. (ISBN 2-923016-04-1)

=== Articles and chapters ===
- Melvin Gallant, "Gides et notre temps", La Revue neuchâtelloise, 1969, p. 18-21
- Melvin Gallant, "Le Nouveau Roman, position et perspectives", La Revue de l'Université de Moncton, vol. 6, no. 2, May 1973, pp. 8–18
- Melvin Gallant, "La Sagouine et la société acadienne", Revue de l'Association canadienne d'éducation de langue française Québec, vol. 2, no. 1, January 1973, p. 21-24
- Melvin Gallant, "L'enseignement de la littérature peut-il être scientifique", Propos littéraires, no. 7, 1973, p. 41-50
- Melvin Gallant, "Le discours obsessionnel dans " La Conversation entre hommes " d'Huguette Légaré", La Revue de l'Université de Moncton, May 1974, p. 203-208
- Melvin Gallant, Marielle Boudreau and Marguerite Maillet, "L'Acadie", in Guide culturel, civilisations et littératures, vol. 4, Paris, Hachette, 1977, p. 286-297
- Melvin Gallant, "Saint-Denys Garneau et l'éblouissement de la nuit", in Le Lieu et la formule, Neuchâtel, La Baconnière, 1978, pp. 203–215
- Melvin Gallant, "Adieu P'tit Chippagan", réminiscences poétiques de l'Ancienne Acadie", Si Que, no. 4, June 1979, p. 193-200
- Melvin Gallant, "À l'abordage", Égalité, no. 1, fall 1980
- Melvin Gallant, "Introduction à la littérature acadienne", Bibliographie acadienne, March 1981, p. 7-12
- Melvin Gallant, "Notre droit à la différence", Bulletin de la Bibliothèque nationale du Québec, November 1981
- Melvin Gallant, "Les romanciers acadiens et le retour aux sources", La Revue d'Histoire littéraire du Québec, no. 3, winter-spring 1982, pp. 106–112
- Melvin Gallant, "Pour un plan d'urbanisation acadien", Égalité, Spring 1982, pp. 123–130
- Melvin Gallant and Samuel Arsenault (contributor), "Pour une refonte des cartes électorales fédérales et provinciales du N.-B.", Égalité, Winter 1983, p. 15-32
- Melvin Gallant, "Du mythe à la réalité: évolution du roman acadien", Incidences, Fall 1984, p. 24-32
- Melvin Gallant, "L'Acadie colonisatrice et colonisée", Les Publications de l'Université de Toulouse, Fall 1984
- Melvin Gallant, "Épopée, fantaisie et symbole dans Don l'Orignal", in Québec Studies, vol. 4, 1986, p. 286-297
- Melvin Gallant, "Évolution de la littérature acadienne", Vie française, 1987

== Bibliography ==
- Cormier, Yves (2007). Compte rendu (PDF) (in French). Vol. 5th. Rabaska: revue d'ethnologie de l'Amérique française.
- Hamel, Réginald (1989). "Gallant, Melvin". Dictionnaire des auteurs de langue française en Amérique du Nord (in French). Fides.
- Leblanc, Michèle (2011). Ti-Jean-Tête d'or de Melvin Gallant (in French). Liaison.
- Long, Daniel (2009). Gallant, Melvin. Ti-Jean l'Intrépide. Illustrations de Michel Duguay. Moncton, Bouton d'Or Acadie, " Météorite " (PDF) (in French). Vol. 7. Rabaska: revue d'ethnologie de l'Amérique française. ISBN 978-2-923518-22-0.
- Maillet, Marguerite; Leblanc, Gérald; Ermont, Bernard (1992). Anthologie de textes littéraires acadiens : 1606-1975 (in French). Éditions d'Acadie. ISBN 2-7600-0228-4.
- Marchildon, Daniel (2007). Le vieux Ti-Jean, toujours nouveau (PDF) (in French). Liaison.
- Potvin, Claude (1995). Melvin Gallant (PDF) (in French). Vol. 18. Lurelu.
- Chiasson, Anselme; Cormier, Charlotte; Deschênes, Donald; Labelle, Ronald (1993). "Le folklore acadien". L'Acadie des Maritimes (in French). Centre d'études acadiennes, Université de Moncton. ISBN 2921166062.
