= Jerome's Secret =

1994 Canadian drama film

- Film poster
- French: Le Secret de Jérôme
- Directed by: Phil Comeau
- Written by: Jean Barbeau; Phil Comeau
- Produced by: Barry Cowling; Marie-Andrée Vinet
- Starring: Denis Lapalme; Myriam Cyr; Germain Houde
- Cinematography: Éric Cayla
- Edited by: Hélène Girard
- Music by: Marcel Aymar
- Production companies: CinéGroupe; Citadel Films; National Film Board of Canada
- Release date: September 23, 1994 (AFF)
- Running time: 100 minutes
- Country: Canada
- Language: French

Jerome's Secret (French: Le Secret de Jérôme) is a Canadian drama film, directed by Phil Comeau and released in 1994. The first-ever Acadian feature film, it dramatizes the story of Jerome, a mysterious man who washed up on a beach at Baie-Sainte-Marie, Nova Scotia, mute and with his legs recently amputated, and lived in the community for the remainder of his life.

Denis Lapalme, a Canadian amputee athlete who previously competed at the Paralympics, portrayed Jerome in his first-ever acting role. The film also stars Myriam Cyr as Julitte, a woman who falls in love with Jerome as she nurses him back to health, and Germain Houde as Jean Nicholas, Julitte's infertile husband whose desire to leave Acadia to return to his native Corsica has caused strain in their marriage, as well as Rémy Girard and Viola Léger in supporting roles.

The film premiered at the 1994 Atlantic Film Festival, where it won the festival's People's Choice Award. It was nominated for two Genie Awards at the 15th Genie Awards, for Best Art Direction or Production Design (Luc J. Béland) and Best Costume Design (Jacinthe Demers).
