= Walls of Memory =

1964 film by Léonard Forest

- French: Mémoire en fête
- Directed by: Léonard Forest
- Written by: Léonard Forest
- Produced by: Marcel Martin
- Narrated by: Michelle Rossignol; Paul Hébert
- Cinematography: Jean-Claude Labrecque
- Edited by: Pierre Lemelin
- Music by: Claude Champagne; Pierre Mercure; Roger Matton
- Production company: National Film Board of Canada
- Release date: 1964
- Running time: 27 minutes
- Country: Canada
- Language: French

Walls of Memory (French: Mémoire en fête) is a Canadian short documentary film, directed by Léonard Forest for the National Film Board of Canada and released in 1964. The film centres on the 300th anniversary of the Séminaire de Québec in 1963.

Jean-Claude Labrecque won the Canadian Film Award for Best Black-and-White Cinematography at the 17th Canadian Film Awards.
