= Le Pays de la Sagouine =

- Le Pays de la Sagouine in August 2026
- Location: Bouctouche, New Brunswick, Canada
- Coordinates: 46.4628°N 64.7138°W
- Type: Acadian cultural heritage

Le Pays de la Sagouine is an Acadian tourist attraction in Bouctouche, New Brunswick, Canada, inspired by the works of Antonine Maillet.

== History ==
Antonine Maillet had written over 30 plays and novels on the Acadians, including her award-winning play: "La Sagouine". Le Pays de la Sagouine was established in 1992 to celebrate that literary success and to show what it was like to live the Acadian life. The celebration is a reenactment of the Acadian culture and is both entertaining and historic for viewers.

Le Pays de la Sagouine is said to attract 60,000 people a season, which far exceeds the population of Bouctouche (2,426). The island (Flea Island / Île-aux-Puces) where Le Pays de la Sagouine is standing was owned by Antoine LeBlanc of Bouctouche. The site's restaurant l'Ordre du bon temps was destroyed by fire on October 23, 2008 but has been rebuilt and is currently in operation.

In 2023, in partnership with Moment factory, Le Pays de la Sagouine opened a 1.5 km (1 mile) trail called Akadi Lumina. The trail includes lights, music and visuals and is intended to be experienced at night.
