= Louis Haché =

Canadian writer (1924–2020)

- Born: 3 May 1924; Saint-Isidore, New Brunswick, Canada
- Died: 22 April 2020 (aged 95); Moncton, New Brunswick, Canada
- Occupation: Writer

Louis Haché (3 May 1924 – 22 April 2020) was a Canadian writer considered to be one of the great Acadian novelists.

== Biography ==
Haché was born on 3 May 1924 in Saint-Isidore, New Brunswick. The Acadian Peninsula did not have a secondary school at the time, so he enrolled at the Collège Sacré-Coeur in Bathurst, where he obtained a bachelor's degree in arts. He also earned a bachelor's in education from the University of St. Joseph's College in Memramcook in 1951, and a master's in French studies from Université Laval in 1959. He worked as a teacher in numerous different schools, notably on Miscou Island. He then became a professor first at the Provincial Normal School in Fredericton, then at the Université de Moncton. He became a translator at the New Brunswick Translation Bureau in 1973, then retired in 1984. He lived in Moncton from 1991 until his death.

Haché believed that the articles in the magazine of Société historique Nicolas-Denys inspired him to focus on the economic and social development of Acadia. He then wrote several articles in the magazine, and the actions inspired by Haché are still being carried out on the Acadian Peninsula. His first five novels, published by Éditions d'Acadie, were set on the islands of Lamèque and Miscou. He was the first winner of the Prix France-Acadie in 1979 for Adieu P'tit Shippagan. This novel, as well as Tourbes jersiaises and Un cortège d'anguilles were based on the history of fishing in Acadia.

From 1996 to 2003, Haché wrote La Tracadienne, Le Desservant de Charnissey, and La Maîtresse d'école, the first Acadian trilogy. He won the Prix l'Acadie entre les lignes, presented by Ici Radio-Canada Télé, for the novel Le desservant de Charnissey. He also received the Prix Champlain in 2004 for La Maîtresse d'école. Playwright Jules Boudreau inquired that his trilogy included "the first real great Acadian novel" and "impressive work, based on a thorough and meticulous research, which brings back to life an entire era through characters of extraordinary presence and truth".

Haché was the first Acadian writer of popular literature, and his writing style was described as easy to read, despite his classic writing style. He won the Prix Plume d'Or in 2004. He published the book De Tracadie à Tiley Road in 2009 at the 4th Acadian World Congress.

Haché died in Moncton on 22 April 2020 at the age of 95.

== Works ==
- Charmante Miscou (1974)
- Adieu, p'tit Shippagan (1979)
- Tourbes jersiaises (1981)
- Un cortège d'anguilles : roman (1985)
- Le Guetteur : récits (1991)
- Sources communes : les familles Haché Gallant (1994)
- Saint-Isidore : paroisse du père Gagnon (1994)
- Le desservant de Charnissey : roman (2001)
- La maîtresse d'école : roman historique (2003)
- La Tracadienne : roman (2003)
- Le grand môme (2006)
- De Tracadie à Tiley Road : essai historique (2009)
- Le dernier gérant des Robin : roman historique (2011)
