= Éloizes =

Former literary magazine in Canada

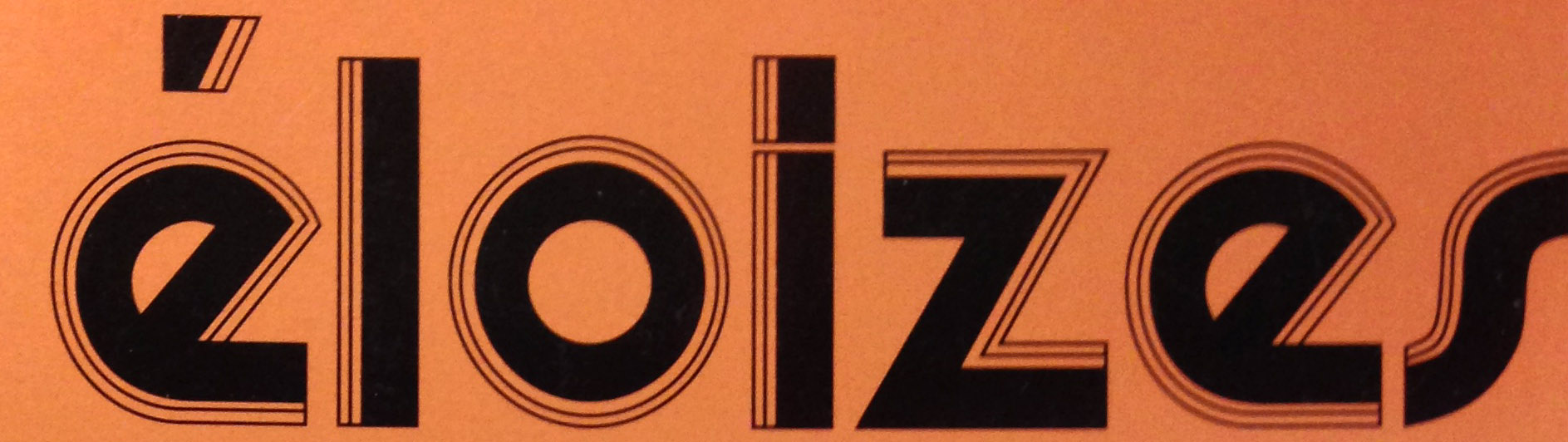
- Categories: Literary publication
- Founded: 1980
- Final issue: 2002
- Country: Canada
- Based in: Moncton
- Language: French
- ISSN: 0228-0124

Éloizes is a former Acadian literary publication based in Moncton, published by the Association of Acadian Writers. The journal was published 32 times between 1980 and 2002.

== Description ==
Founded by Pierre Berthiaume, Bernadette Landry, Dyane Léger, Henri-Dominique Paratte and Melvin Gallant, the journal is "one of the results of the cultural turmoil in Acadia" and encouraged the emergence of multiple Acadian literary voices. It also encouraged exchange projects with other American francophone communities (Ontario and Louisiana).

"The journal Éloizes has played a determining role in the Acadian literary landscape: both in the emergence of a literary word and in the constitution of a real discourse on literature in Acadia, this journal has been a vector of legitimation. It also enabled the emergence of a true Acadian literary community, which extended to authors who were friends of Acadia and to cousin literatures from minority Francophone contexts. The Éloizes review thus participated in Acadian literary history, as a seismograph of the tensions of the time, but also as a laboratory for new practices".

"The Acadian review Éloizes, which was published in Moncton from 1980 to 2002, shows us the crucial importance that creative literary reviews can sometimes take in the movement for the emergence and affirmation of literatures".
