= Gérald Leblanc =

Acadian poet and writer (1945–2005)

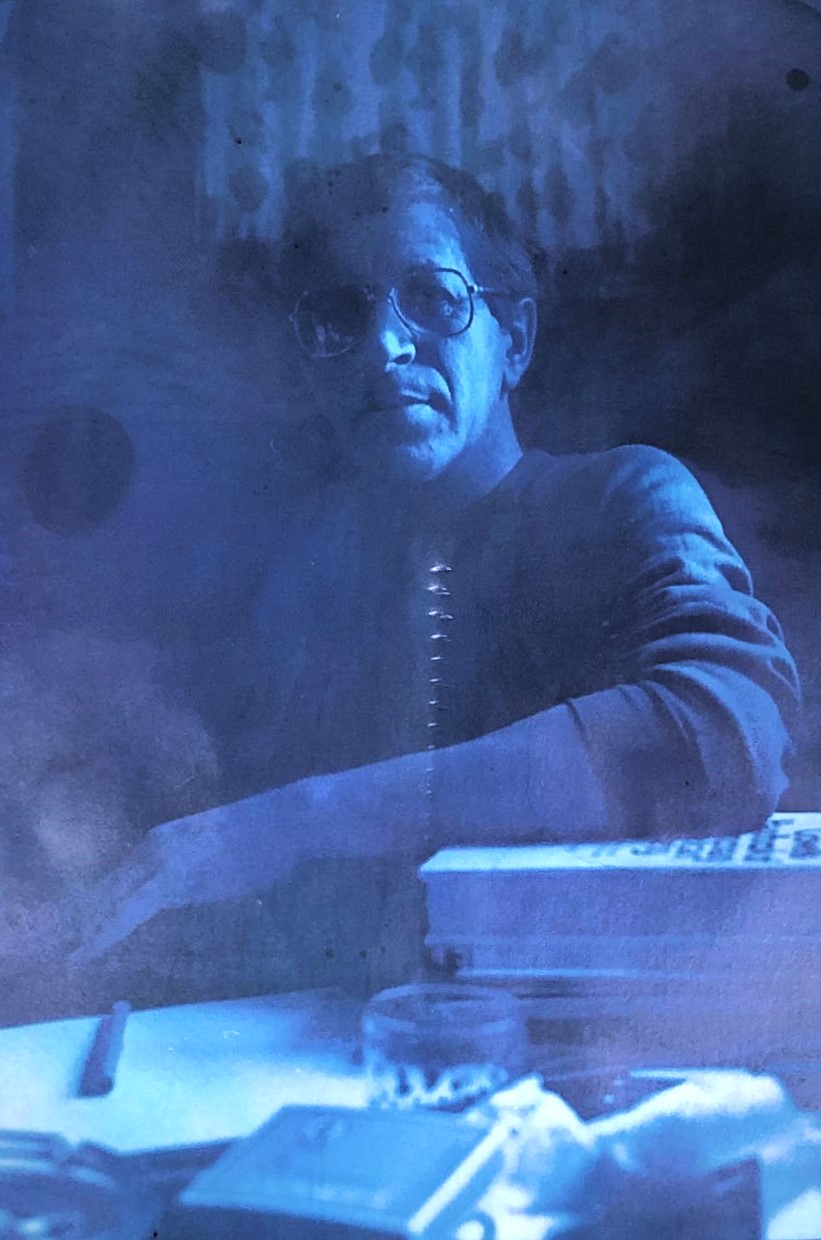
- Gerry in blue at 110 Weldon, 1987
- Born: September 25, 1945; Bouctouche, New Brunswick, Canada
- Died: 30 May 2005 (aged 59); Moncton, New Brunswick, Canada
- Occupation: Writer
- Writing career
- Genres: Poetry, novels, plays, translation

Gérald Leblanc (September 25, 1945 – May 30, 2005) was an Acadian poet notable for seeking his own Acadian roots and the current voices of Acadian culture. Leblanc was born in Bouctouche, New Brunswick. He studied at the Université de Moncton and lived in Moncton, where he died in 2005. He also spent a good part of his life in New York City, which he loved.

Deeply Acadian and North American, Gérald Leblanc tirelessly sought the roots of his Acadian identity. The quality and abundance of his poetic work guarantee him a place amongst the most important authors of modern Acadian poetry. He was also the author, along with Claude Beausoleil, of an anthology of Acadian poetry. He was the lyricist for the Acadian musical group 1755 and wrote many of the group's classic songs ("Le monde a bien changé", "Boire ma bouteille", "Rue Dufferin", "Kouchibouguac"). He was an unabashed champion of "chiac", which is the slang spoken mainly in south eastern New Brunswick and mixes English and French words and syntax.

As a poet and speaker, he was invited to various countries: Canada (Vancouver, Winnipeg, Toronto, Montreal, Halifax,etc.), the United States (New York and New Orleans), France (Paris, La Rochelle, Caen, Grenoble, Lyon, and Poitiers), Belgium (Brussels, Namur, Liège), the Republic of Congo (Kinshasa), Mexico (Mexico City), the Czech Republic (Prague), Slovakia (Bratislava), and Switzerland (Delémont).

== Works ==
Leblanc's texts (written in French) have been translated into English, Spanish, Italian, Chinese, Czech and Slovak.

=== Letters ===
- Lettres à mon ami américain 1967-2003: édition annotée préparée par Benoit Doyon-Gosselin, Sudbury, Éditions Prise de parole, 2018 (postmortem)

=== Poetry ===
- Poèmes new-yorkais suivi de Lettres new-yorkaises, poems 1972–1988, letters 1993–1994, Sudbury, Éditions Prise de parole, 2021 (postmortem)
- L'extrême frontière, poèmes 1972-1988, Sudbury, Éditions Prise de parole, 2015 (postmortem)
- Éloge du chiac, Moncton, Éditions Perce-Neige, 2015 (postmortem)
- Complaintes du continent, Moncton, Éditions Perce-Neige, 2014 (postmortem)
- Poèmes new-yorkais (1992-1998), Moncton, Éditions Perce-Neige, 2006 (postmortem)
- Techgnose, Moncton, Éditions Perce-Neige, 2004
- Géomancie, Ottawa, Éditions l'Interligne, 2003
- Le plus clair du temps, Moncton, Éditions Perce-Neige, 2001
- Je n'en connais pas la fin, Moncton, Éditions Perce-Neige, 1999
- Méditations sur le désir, artist's book, with Guy Duguay, Moncton, limited edition, hand printed on paper crafted by and with lithographs by Guy Duguay, 1996
- Éloge du chiac, Moncton, Éditions Perce-Neige, 1995
- Complaintes du continent, Moncton/Trois-Rivières, Éditions Perce-Neige/Écrits des forges, 1993
- De la rue, la mémoire, la musique, Montreal, Lèvres urbaines n. 24, 1993
- L'événement Rimbaud, with Herménégilde Chiasson and Claude Beausoleil, Moncton/Trois-Rivières, Éditions Perce-Neige/Écrits des forges, 1991
- Les matins habitables, Moncton, Éditions Perce-Neige, 1991
- L'extrême frontière, Moncton, Éditions d'Acadie, 1988
- Lieux transitoires, Moncton, Michel Henry Éditeur, 1986
- Précis d'intensité, with Herménégilde Chiasson, Montreal, Lèvres urbaines n. 12, 1985
- Géographie de la nuit rouge, Moncton, Éditions d'Acadie, 1984
- Comme un otage du quotidien, Moncton, Éditions Perce-Neige, 1981

=== Novels ===
- Moncton Mantra, preface by Herménégilde Chiasson, Sudbury, Éditions Prise de parole, [2012] 2008 (postmortem)
- Moncton Mantra, English translation by Jo-Anne Elder, Toronto, Guernica, 2001
- Moncton Mantra, Moncton, Éditions Perce-Neige, 1997

=== Translation ===
- Amazon Angel, Original Ange amazone by Yolande Villemaire, 1982, English translation by Gérald Leblanc, 1993

=== Essays ===
- La poésie acadienne, with Claude Beausoleil (selection and introduction), Moncton/Trois-Rivières, Éditions Perce-Neige/Écrits des Forges, 1999
- La poésie acadienne 1948-1988, with Claude Beausoleil (selection and introduction), Trois-Rivières/Paris, Écrits des Forges/Le Castor Astral, 1988

=== Theatre ===
- Et moi!, text for the Département d'art dramatique of the Université de Moncton, with three other Acadian authors: Gracia Couturier, France Daigle and Herménégilde Chiasson, 1999
- Les sentiers de l'espoir, text for the Théâtre l’Escaouette, 1983
- Sus la job avec Alyre, text for the actor Bernard LeBlanc, 1982

=== Radio ===
- L'été saison des retours, 30 minute text for the FM Network of Radio-Canada, 1989
- Pascal Poirier, one hour text for the FM Network of Radio-Canada, 1982

=== Publications ===
- Éloizes (Moncton)
- Pleins feux (Moncton)
- Le Journal (Moncton)
- Vallium (Moncton)
- Ven'd'est (Petit Rocher)
- Lèvres urbaines (Montréal)
- Le Devoir (Montréal)
- Estuaire (Montréal)
- Le Sabord (Trois-Rivières)
- Liberté (Montréal)
- Ellipse (Sherbrooke)
- Liaison (Ontario)
- Parallélogramme (Toronto)
- Intervention à haute voix (France)
- Cahier bleu (France)
- Jungle (France)
- Europe (France)
- Mensuel 25 (Belgium)
- Textual (Mexico)
- etc.

== Literary awards ==
- Literary Award from the City of Moncton, for L'extrême frontière, during the City Centennial Celebrations, 1990
- Pascal-Poirier Award, from the New Brunswick government for his complete works, 1993
- Terrasses St-Sulpice Award, from the Estuaire magazine, for Complaintes du continent, 1994

== Documentary about Gérald Leblanc ==
Living on the Edge, the Poetic Works of Gérald Leblanc also known by its French language title L'extrême frontière, l'oeuvre poétique de Gérald Leblanc is a 2005 documentary film by Canadian director of Acadian origin Rodrigue Jean. In this documentary, Rodrigue Jean pays tribute to his Acadian roots, focusing on the poetry of Gérald Leblanc.
