= Hélène Harbec =

Canadian writer (born 1946)

Hélène Harbec (born 1946) is a Canadian writer.

She was born in Saint-Jean-sur-Richelieu, Quebec and was educated at Laval University. Harbec has lived in Moncton, New Brunswick since 1970.

She published poems in several literary magazines including Éloizes, Le Sabord and Arcade belles interurbaines. In 1986, she published L'été avant la mort, written with France Daigle. This was followed by a collection of poems Le cahier des absences et de la décision in 1991 and a novel L'orgueilleuse in 1998. In 2002, she published her second poetry collection Va, which was awarded the Prix Antonine-Maillet-Acadie-Vie. Several of her poems appeared in a special issue of Dalhousie French Studies in 2003 entitled Auteures acadiennes: création et critique. She published a collection of poems Le tracteur céleste in 2005.

== Selected works ==
- Les voiliers blancs, novel (2004)
- Le cahier des absences et de la décision, poetry (2009)
- Chambre 503, fiction (2009)
