= Martine L. Jacquot =

French journalist, novelist and poet (born 1955)

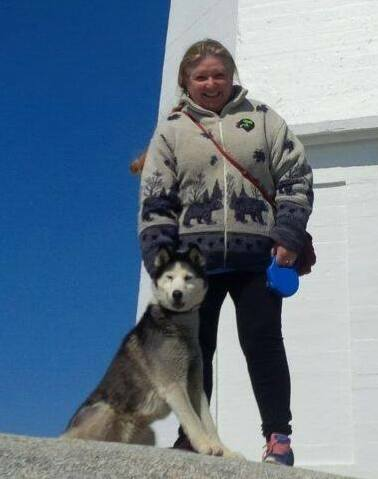
- Writing career
- Genres: poetry; novels; children's literature; short stories; essays
- Notable work: Nanouk series
- Movement: Littérature acadienne

Martine L. Jacquot (French: [maʁtin ʒako]; born 1955) is a French-born novelist, poet, short story writer and journalist, living in Canada since 1982. She has a doctorate in French literature.

== Early life and education ==
Martine Lydie Jacquot was born in La Ferté-Gaucher, France, May 27, 1955, and spent her first five years in Saint-Mars-en-Brie, France.

She obtained her baccalaureate from the Lycée de Coulommiers in 1974. She then entered the Sorbonne Nouvelle University Paris 3 in Paris, where she earned a BA in English in 1977 and an MA in British literature in 1979. She taught for a year in Canterbury, England at the Simon Langton Girls' Grammar School, and then studied at the University of Provence Aix-Marseille I (preparation for the Capes and Agrégation of English). She worked for a few months at the Danish Consulate General in Marseille, France, then at CERN in Geneva, Switzerland, as a bilingual secretary.

She moved to Nova Scotia, Canada, in September 1981, and obtained a bachelor's degree in journalism from the University of King's College in Halifax in 1984, a master's degree in Canadian literature from Acadia University in 1986 and a Ph.D. in French literature from Dalhousie University in Halifax in 1995 with a thesis entitled, Le regard dans l'oeuvre de Marguerite Duras.

== Career ==
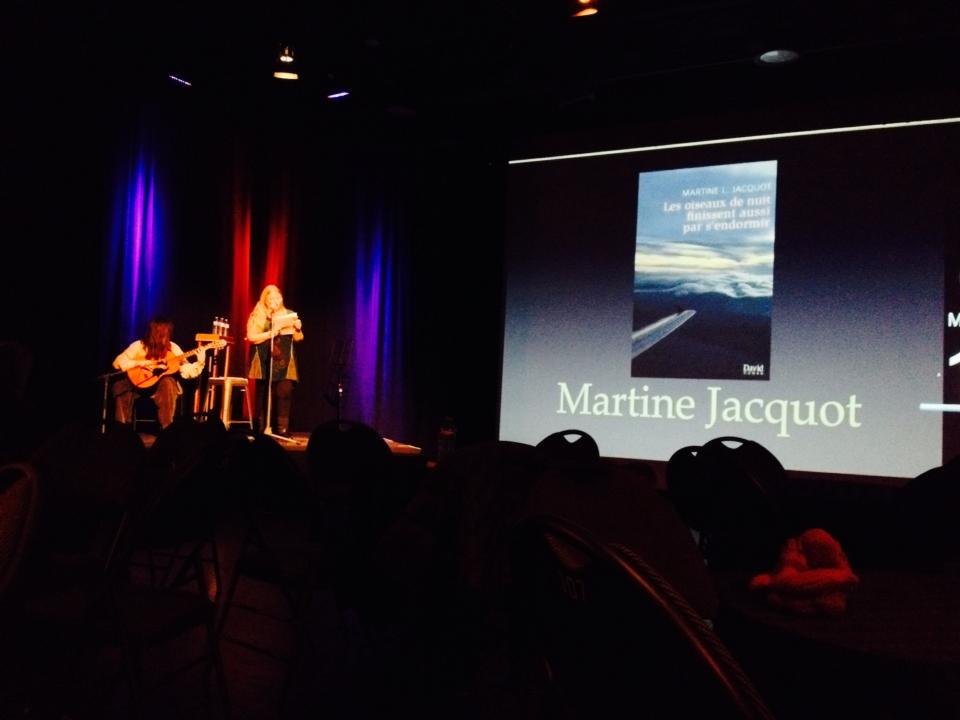
Martine L. Jacquot reading, accompanied by the guitar, at the literary marathon of the journal Ancrage "43 200 seconds" in 2016.

She teaches at various universities (Dalhousie, Acadia, St. Mary's, St. Anne's) as well as being a journalist (Ven'd'est, Le Courrier de la Nouvelle-Écosse, among others), and translator.

She was President of the Conseil Culturel Acadien de la Nouvelle-Écosse (CCANÉ) for three years and created the magazine ARTcadie. She was a member of the Board of Governors of the Nova Scotia Museum for 12 years. She is editor-in-chief of the academic journal Les Cahiers canadiens based at the Volgograd State University in Russia and a long-time contributor to Arabic-language publications such as Ashtarowt and Al Quds.

A prolific, internationally published, polygraphic author, she is a poet, novelist, short story writer, essayist, and children's author. Her work is part of the Littérature acadienne. She is one of the few Acadian authors of short stories. These are collected in Sables mouvants (1994), Des Oiseaux dans la tête (1998), and Les enjoliveurs du temps (2023). Most of her work is contemporary, but she has moved into historical fiction with Au gré du vent (2005), set in Halifax and southwestern Nova Scotia during the second half of the 19th century, for which she has written a sequel, Déferlement sur le siècle nouveau (2023). Her Nanouk series, centered around a husky, is particularly popular with young readers. Her novels often centre around a protagonist (sometimes also a narrator) who makes a journey or displacement that causes her to reconsider her family or social situation.

She is a member of the Parlement des Écrivaines Francophones and has published internationally.

== Awards and honours ==
- 1987, Short story prize, Revue Liaison, for Des Yeux d'Irlande
- 1990, President's Award, literary contest of the Société Culturelle du Haut Saint-Jean, Edmundston, New Brunswick, for Les Nuits Démasquées
- 1992, Short story award, Revue Liaison, with Jazz
- 1994, Winner, "L'Acadie à découvrir" contest, SRC radio
- 1997, Winner, Concours de vieux mots acadiens, SRC radio
- 2000, Winner, Ontario Writers' Association Short Story Award (performed on stage at the Théâtre du Trillium, Ottawa)
- 2004, Acadia Student Union Teaching Recognition Award
- 2007, Prix Europe de l'ADELF (Association des écrivains de langue française) for Au gré du vent6
- 2022, Prix d'Excellence, French & Friends Multilingual Book Festival, Washington, D.C., with Filigrane and La couleur du désir
- 2023, Shortlisted, Prix Quinquennal du Prix Antonine-Maillet-Acadie Vie pour l'ensemble de son oeuvre.

== Selected works ==
- Les terres douces : roman, 1988
- Route 138, 1989
- Fleurs de pain : poésie, 1991
- Les nuits démasquées, 1991
- Espaces du réel, cheminements de création : Michel Goeldlin, 1995
- Les glycines : roman 1996
- Des oiseaux dans la tête : nouvelles, 1998
- Etapes : poèmes choisis (1982-1995), 2001
- Points de repère sur palimpseste usé : poésie, 2002
- Masques : roman, 2003
- Le secret de l'île, 2003
- Au gré du vent ... : roman, 2005
- Le silence de la neige : poésie, 2007
- Duras, ou, Le regard absolu, 2009
- La bande à Nanouk : roman jeunesse, 2009
- Les oiseaux de nuit finissent aussi par s'endormir : roman , 2014
