= Léonard Forest =

Canadian filmmaker and writer (1928–2024)

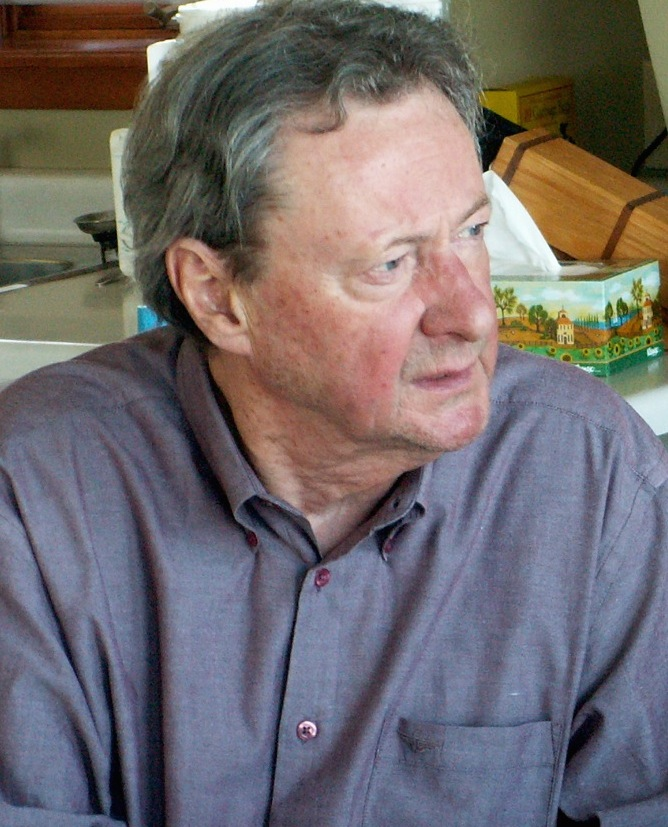
- Forest in 2009
- Born: January 17, 1928; Chelsea, Massachusetts, U.S.
- Died: March 19, 2024 (aged 96)
- Occupations: Author, film director, scriptwriter, film producer
- Years active: 1953–2004

Léonard Forest (January 17, 1928 – March 19, 2024) was an American-born Canadian filmmaker, poet and essayist.

== Life and career ==
Léonard Forest was born in Massachusetts, United States, and grew up in Moncton, New Brunswick, Canada.

Forest worked at the National Film Board from 1953 to 1980 and was involved in about 130 films, either as director, producer or script-writer.

Forest died on March 19, 2024, at the age of 96.

== Filmography ==
=== As director ===
- The Charwoman (La femme de ménage) – 1954
- The Dikes (Les aboiteaux) – 1955, co-directed with Roger Blais
- Fishermen of Pubnico (Pêcheurs de Pomcoup) – 1956
- Le monde des femmes – 1956
- Haiti (Amitiés haïtiennes) – 1957
- The Whole World Over – 1957
- Bonjou' soleil – 1957
- In Search of Innocence (À la recherche de l'innocence) – 1964
- Walls of Memory (Mémoire en fête) – 1964
- Les Acadiens de la dispersion – 1968
- Acadie libre – 1969
- Out of Silence – 1970
- La noce est pas finie – 1971
- A Sun Like Nowhere Else (Un soleil pas comme ailleurs) – 1972
- Far from Away: The Arts in St. John's (Saint-Jean-sur-ailleurs) – 1980
- Portrait: Gerald Squires of Newfoundland – 1980

=== As script writer ===
- Les aboiteaux (1955)
- Les midinettes (1955)
- Pêcheurs de Pomcoup (1956)
- La vie est courte (1956)
- Amitiés haïtiennes (1957)
- Bonjou' soleil (1957)
- L'héritage (1960)
- À la recherche de l'innocence (1964)
- Mémoire en fête (1964)
- Les Acadiens de la dispersion (1968)
- Un soleil pas comme ailleurs (1972)
- Saint-Jean-sur-ailleurs (1980)
- Portrait: Gerald Squires of Newfoundland (1980)

=== As producer ===
- Panoramique six films made for television (1957–1958)

including:

- The Promised Land (Les Brûlés)
- Le maître du Pérou
- Il était une guerre
- Les mains nettes
- Les 90 jours

- Le monde du travail five films (1957–1958)
- L'Urbanisme (1957–1958)
- La drave(1957–1958)
- Series «Profils et Paysages» (1958–1959)

including:

- Germaine Guèvremont, romancière
- John Lyman, peintre
- Félix Leclerc, troubadour
- Charles Forest, curé-fondateur
- Fred Barry, comédien
- Henri Gagnon, organiste
- Marius Barbeau, anthropologue
- Pierre Beaulieu, agriculteur
- Lionel Groulx, historien I
- Lionel Groulx, historien II
- Les Petites Sœurs, religieuses cloîtrées
- Georges Vanier, soldat, diplomate et gouverneur-général
- Édouard Simard, industriel I
- Édouard Simard, industriel II
- St-Denys Garneau, poète
- Wilfred Pelletier, musicien
- Alfred Desrochers, poète
- Cyrias Ouellet, homme de science

- La canne à pêche (1959)
- Normétal (1959)
- L'immigré (1959)
- La canne à pêche (1959)
- Au bout de ma rue (1960)
- L'héritage (1960)
- La misère des autres (1960)

== Published works ==
- Saisons antérieures poetry (1973) at Éditions d'Acadie
- Comme en Florence poetry (1980) was awarded the prix France-Acadie
- La jointure du temps essays (1998) at Éditions Perce-Neige, was awarded the Prix Champlain 1999
- Le pommier d'août poetry (2001) at Éditions Perce-Neige
- Les trois pianos children's book (2003) at Éditions Bouton d'or Acadie
- Ni queue ni tête children's book (2004) at Éditions Bouton d'or Acadie

== Bibliography ==
Josette Déléas, Léonard Forest ou le regard pionnier, Centre d'études acadiennes, Moncton, 1998
