= Françoise Enguehard =

French journalist and writer

- Born: Françoise Reux; 1957 (age 68–69); Saint-Pierre-et-Miquelon
- Other name: Françoise Enguehard-Reux
- Occupations: Writer, journalist
- Years active: 1970–present

Françoise Enguehard (born 1957) is a French-speaking author from Saint-Pierre-et-Miquelon who now resides in Canada. She served as president of the National Society of Acadia (French: Société Nationale de l'Acadie) from 2006 to 2012 and is the current president of the National Acadian Foundation. She and her husband have been involved in promoting the history and education about Acadian people, through the development of schools. She speaks throughout the French-speaking countries to promote French culture. She received the rank of Knight in the Order of La Pléiade in 2011 and was honored as a knight in the Legion of Honour, France's highest award, in 2015 for her commitment to preserving the heritage of Acadians and Saint-Pierre-et-Miquelon.

== Early life ==
Françoise Reux was born in 1957 in the French Overseas collectivity of Saint-Pierre-et-Miquelon to Alice and Jean Reux. After studying French literature, in 1970, she moved to St. John's on the nearby island of Newfoundland, in Canada and soon married René Enguehard, also from Saint Pierre.

Enguehard and her husband were involved in founding several French schools, as well as a French School Board, to manage the French-language educational facilities in Newfoundland and Labrador. Enguehard joined the Télévision de Radio-Canada Atlantique, becoming their first journalist in Newfoundland in 1992. During her time with CBC, Enguehard began publishing novels. Her first book published in 1999 was Les litanies de l'Île-aux-Chiens, was reprinted in 2001 and released in English.

Enguehard left CBC in 2001 and founded a communications company Vivat. In addition to continuing her writing, publishing two juvenile novels Le trésor d'Elvis Bozec (2001) and Le pilote du Roy (2007), Enguehard speaks at various conferences and festivals promoting education on French language, culture and the history of the Acadians.

Between 2006 and 2012, Enguehard served as president of the National Society of Acadia, In 2011, Enguehard was honored as a knight in the Order of La Pléiade from the Organisation internationale de la Francophonie for her contributions in developing the French language. In 2015, her commitment to preserving the heritage of Acadians and Saint-Pierre-et-Miquelon was recognized with France's highest award, when she was honored as a knight in the Legion of Honour. She is currently the president of the National Acadian Foundation. In 2018, she moderated the NL NDP leadership debate.

== Selected works ==
- 1999 Les litanies de l'Île-aux-Chiens
- 2001 Le trésor d'Elvis Bozec
- 2007 Le pilote du Roy
- 2010 L'archipel du docteur Thomas
