= Serge Patrice Thibodeau =

Canadian writer (born 1959)

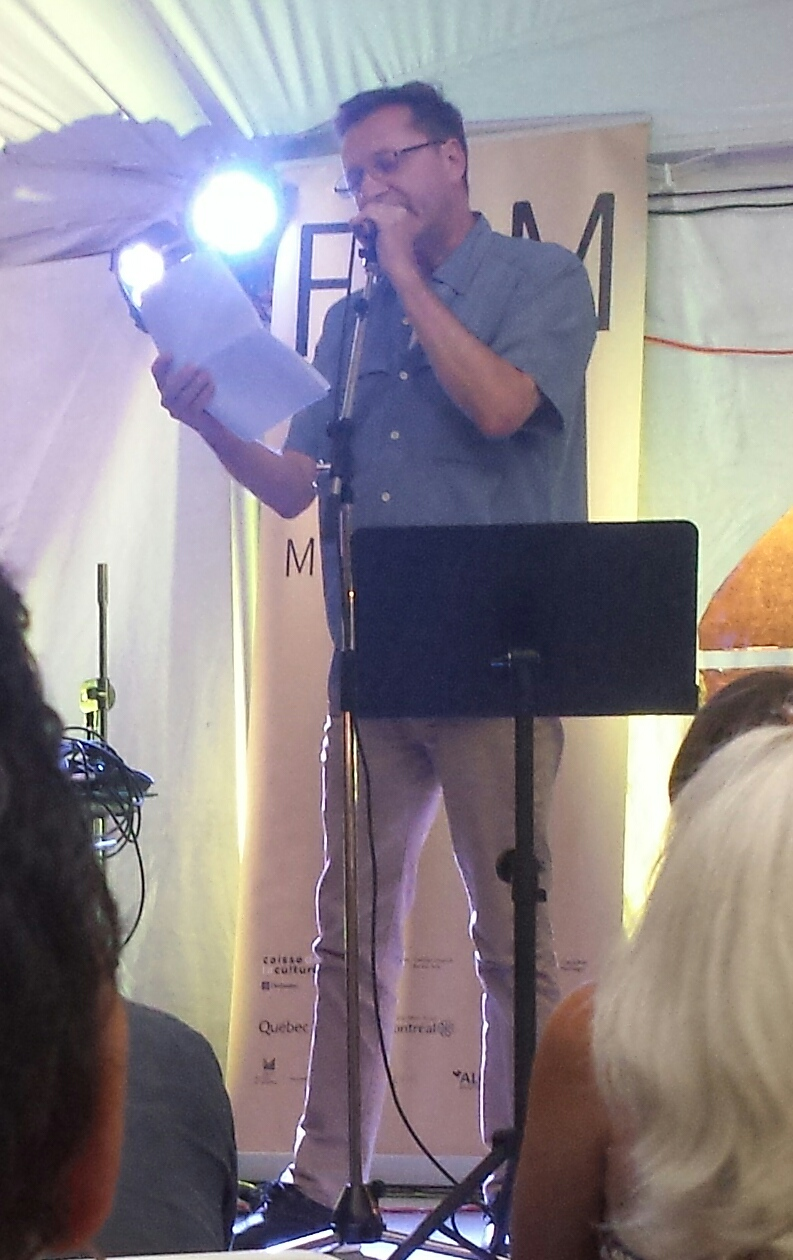
- Serge Patrice Thibodeau in Montréal, Québec, Canada at the 2018 Montréal Poetry Festival
- Born: August 11, 1959 (age 67); Rivière-Verte, New Brunswick, Canada
- Occupation: writer
- Writing career
- Genre: poetry
- Notable works: Le Quatuor de l'errance, La Traversée du désert, Seul on est, Le cycle de Prague

Serge Patrice Thibodeau (born August 11, 1959) is a Canadian writer. He is a two-time winner of the Governor General's Award for French-language poetry—winning at the 1996 Governor General's Awards for Le Quatuor de l'errance and La Traversée du désert, and at the 2007 Governor General's Awards for Seul on est -- and also won the Prix Émile-Nelligan in 1992 for Le cycle de Prague.

== Life ==
Originally from Rivière-Verte, New Brunswick, Thibodeau was educated at the Université de Moncton and Université Laval. Based in Montreal through the 1980s and 1990s, he returned to Moncton, New Brunswick, in the 2000s to serve as writer-in-residence at the Université de Moncton and as editorial director of Éditions Perce-Neige. He is also an active member of Amnesty International.

== Honours ==
- 1991 - Prix France-Acadie, La Septième Chute
- 1992 - Prix Émile-Nelligan, Le Cycle de Prague
- 1993 - Nomination pour le Prix du Gouverneur général de poésie, Le Cycle de Prague
- 1994 - Prix Edgar-Lespérance, L'Appel des mots
- 1995 - Grand Prix du Festival international de la poésie, Le Quatuor de l'errance et pour Nous, l'étranger
- 1996 - Prix du Gouverneur général, Le Quatuor de l'errance suivi de La Traversée du désert
- 2001 - Prix Éloizes - Artiste de l'année en littérature par l'Académie des Arts et des Lettres de l'Atlantique, Le Roseau
- 2005 – Prix Antonine-Maillet-Acadie Vie pour son recueil de poésie Que repose, publié aux Éditions Perce-Neige.
- 2007 - Prix du Gouverneur général : poésie de langue française, Seul on est
- 2009 - Chevalier de l'Ordre de la Pléiade, ordre de la Francophonie et du dialogue des cultures

== Works ==
- La septième chute Moncton N.-B. : Éditions d'Acadie, 1990, 181 p.; 22 cm., ISBN 2760001733
- Le cycle de Prague Éditions d'Acadie, 1992, 155 p.; 21 cm. ISBN 2760002187
- Le passage des glaces Trois-Rivières : Écrits des Forges; Moncton : Perce-Neige, 1992, 99 p.; 21 cm., ISBN 2890462692
- L'appel des mots L'Hexagone, Collection Itinéraires; 22, 1993, 238 p.; 23 cm., ISBN 2-89006-485-9 (br.)
- Nous, l'étranger Écrits des Forges; Echternach (Luxembourg) : Éditions Phi, 1995, 84 p.; 21 cm., ISBN 2-89046-379-6
- Le quatuor de l'errance suivi de La traversée du désert Montréal : L'Hexagone, L'Hexagone/Poésie, 1995, 252 p.; 23 cm., ISBN 2-89006-544-8 (br.)
- Dans la cité Montréal : L'Hexagone, Collection Poésie, 1997, 182 p.; 23 cm., ISBN 2-89006-591-X (br.)
- Nocturnes Trois-Rivières : Écrits des Forges, 1997, 96 p.; 21 cm., ISBN 2-89046-429-6 (br.)
- La disgrâce de l'humanité Montréal : VLB, Collection Partis pris actuels; 16, 1999, 194 p.; 22 cm., ISBN 2-89005-716-X (br.)
- Le roseau Montréal : L'Hexagone, Poésie, 2000, ISBN 2-89006-637-1
- Du haut de mon arbre Éditions Perce-Neige, Collection Poésie, 2000, 83 p.; 19 cm., ISBN 2-920221-85-X (br.)
- Seuils Éditions Perce-Neige, Collection Poésie, 2002, 137 p.; 19 cm., ISBN 2-920221-96-5 (br.)
- Que repose Moncton : Éditions Perce-neige, Collection Poésie, 2004, 111 p.; 20 cm., ISBN 2-922992-13-6 (br.)
- Lieux cachés Moncton : Perce-Neige, 2005, 144 p., ISBN 2-922992-23-3
- Seul on est Éditions Perce-Neige, Collection Poésie, 2006, 53 p.; 19 cm. ISBN 2-922992-33-0 (br.)
- Les sept dernières paroles de Judas L'Hexagone, Collection L'appel des mots, 2008, 78 p.; 18 cm.ISBN 978-2-89006-802-5
- Journal de John Winslow à Grand Pré Éditions Perce-Neige, 2010, 312 p., 978-2-922992-57-1
- Sous la banquise Éditions du Noroît, 2013, (ISBN 978-2-89018-819-8)
