= Germaine Comeau =

Canadian writer (born 1946)

- Born: 1946 (age 78–79); Yarmouth, Nova Scotia, Canada
- Occupation: Writer
- Education: Université Sainte-Anne (BA); University of Ottawa (BEd); Université Sorbonne Nouvelle

Germaine Comeau (born 1946) is a Canadian writer of Acadian descent.

The daughter of Lucille and Alphonse Comeau, she was born in Yarmouth, Nova Scotia. She received a BA from the Université Sainte-Anne and a BEd from the University of Ottawa. She later received a master's degree in theatre studies from the University of Paris III: Sorbonne Nouvelle. She has been employed as a teacher and journalist, as well as an author of novels and plays. She later worked in the Centre provincial de ressources pédagogiques at the Université Sainte-Anne, where she prepared educational materials for Acadian students, for a number of years. She has lived most of her life in the village of Meteghan River which is known in French as La Butte.

Comeau published the play Les pêcheurs déportés in 1974. In 1983, she published a novel L'été aux puits secs which won the Prix France-Acadie. She later was awarded the Prix littéraire Antonine-Maillet-Acadie Vie for her novel Laville. Comeau has also written radio plays for Société Radio-Canada.
