= Herménégilde Chiasson =

Canadian politician (born 1946)

The Honourable Doctor Herménégilde Chiasson OC ONB RCA
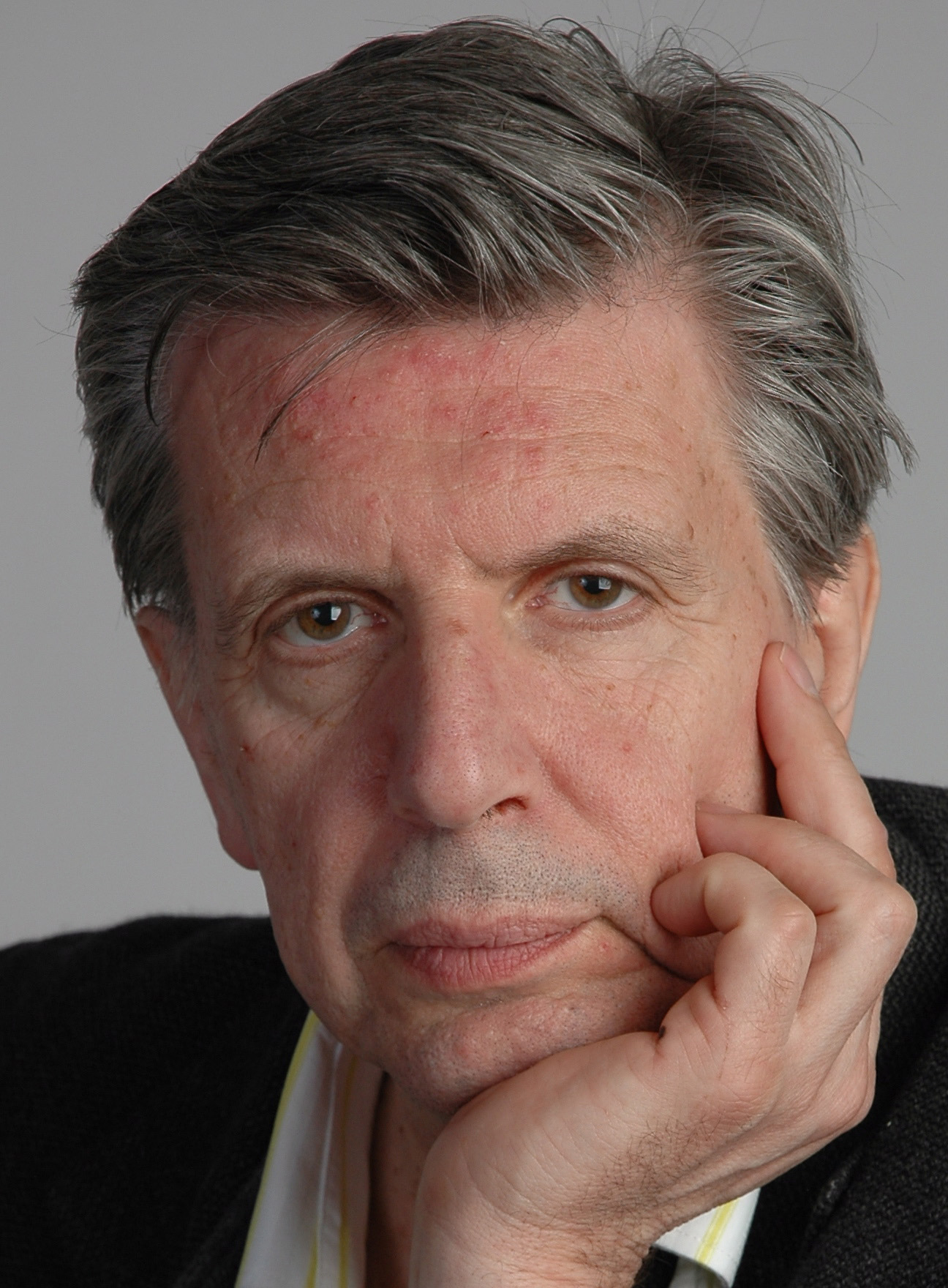
- Chiasson in 2010

29th Lieutenant Governor of New Brunswick
- In office 26 August 2003 – 30 September 2009
- Monarch: Elizabeth II
- Governors General: Adrienne Clarkson; Michaëlle Jean
- Premier: Bernard Lord; Shawn Graham
- Preceded by: Marilyn Trenholme Counsell
- Succeeded by: Graydon Nicholas

Personal details
- Born: 7 April 1946 (age 80) Saint-Simon, New Brunswick, Canada
- Spouse: Marcia Babineau
- Profession: Poet, playwright

Herménégilde Chiasson OC ONB RCA (born 7 April 1946) is a Canadian poet, playwright and visual artist of Acadian origin. Born in Saint-Simon, New Brunswick, he was the 29th Lieutenant Governor of New Brunswick between 2003 and 2009. He is also currently a professor at Université de Moncton.

== Education ==
- Bachelor of Arts, Université de Moncton (1967)
- Bachelor of Fine Arts, Mount Allison University (1972)
- Masters in Esthetics, University of Paris (Sorbonne), (1975)
- Master of Fine Arts, State University of New York, Visual Studies Workshop in Rochester, New York (1981)
- Doctorate, University of Paris (Sorbonne), (1983)

He was made a Grand Officer of the National Order of Merit (France) as per the Canada Gazette of 26 November 2011.

== Career and private life ==
He is married to Marcia (Babineau) with one daughter, Sara-Jane. He served in many positions (director, playwright, journalist, researcher) with Radio-Canada from 1968 until 1985. During this time, he also made many contributions to the cultural framework of New Brunswick: directing the Galerie d'art de l'Université de Moncton in 1974, serving as President of the Galerie sans nom in 1980, helping found the Editions Perce Neige in 1984 and the Aberdeen Cultural Centre in 1985. He worked on several such projects after leaving Radio-Canada before becoming a professor of the history of Art and Cinema at the Université de Moncton in 1988. He is a member of the Royal Canadian Academy of Arts In 2017, Chiasson received the biennial Strathbutler Award for visual art in New Brunswick.

== Bibliography ==
=== Poetry ===
- Mourir à Scoudouc (1974) (English translation: To Live and Die in Scoudouc)
- Rapport sur l’état de mes illusions (1976)
- Climat (1996) (English translation: Climate.)
- Conversations (1999) (Winner of the 1999 Governor General's Literary Award for poetry.)

=== Theatre ===
- Cap Enragé (1992)
- L'exil d'Alexa (1993)
- Aliénor (1998)
- Le Christ est apparu au Gun Club (2005)

== Arms ==
Coat of arms of Herménégilde Chiasson
Notes The arms of Herménégilde Chiasson consist of: Crest A bear passant Azure charged on the shoulder with a mullet Or, holding in its dexter paw a theatrical mask per pale Azure and Gules. Escutcheon Azure between four billets Argent a pen and a paintbrush in saltire Or. Supporters Two sea-Pegasi Argent queued Azure winged, crined and webbed Or, each charged on the shoulder with a purple violet flower proper. Compartment Barry wavy Argent and Azure. Motto En Toute Bonne Foy

== Documentary ==
- 2016 - Herménégilde Chiasson, de ruptures en contraintes (realisation Ginette Pellerin)
