= Raymond Guy LeBlanc =

Canadian poet and musician (1945–2021)

Raymond Guy LeBlanc (24 January 1945 – 28 October 2021) was a Canadian poet and musician. He was an Acadian born in the village of Saint-Anselme, now part of Dieppe, New Brunswick near Moncton.

He was the author of the first collection of Acadian poetry published by an Acadian press, "Cri de Terre" in 1972. This and other literary contributions over a 50-year career made him a symbol of an Acadian cultural renaissance in the second half of the twentieth century.
