= Diereville =

French surgeon, botanist and travel writer

Diereville (Dièreville, Sieur de Dièreville, Dière de Dièreville) was a French surgeon, botanist and travel writer, born in France, probably in Pont-l'Évêque, Calvados.

Dièreville is known mostly for his travels in Acadia from October 1699 to October 1700. The plant genus, Diervilla, was named in honour of him by French botanist Tournefort.

Dièreville wrote about his observations in Acadia in "Relation du voyage du Port Royal de l’Acadie, ou de la Nouvelle France" which was first published in Rouen in 1708. It was re-published with notes by LU Fontaine in Quebec in 1885. In 1933, the Champlain Society published another edition as part of its General Series, edited by John Clarence Webster, with an English translation by Alice Webster.
