= France Daigle =

Canadian author of Acadian ethnicity

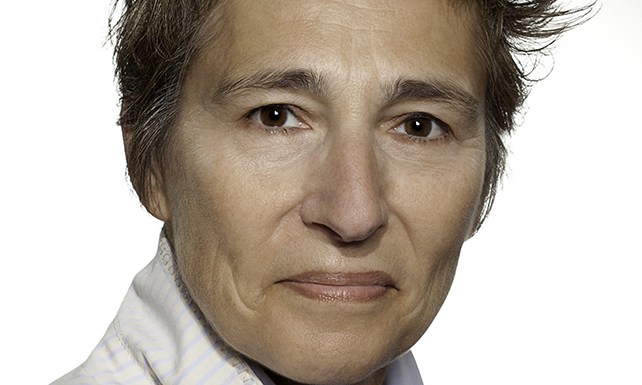
- Born: November 18, 1953 (age 72); Moncton, New Brunswick, Canada
- Occupations: Novelist, playwright, poet, columnist
- Spouse: Berthe Theriault
- Writing career
- Genres: novels, plays, poetry, weekly column in L'Acadie Nouvelle

France Daigle (born 18 November 1953) is a Canadian author of Acadian ethnicity. Born and raised in Moncton, New Brunswick, he has published nine novels and three plays. Daigle writes in French and has pioneered the use of the Chiac in her written dialogue. He uses standard French in her narration.

== Career ==
Daigle was awarded the 1999 France-Acadie award for her novel Pas Pire and the 2002 Éloize award for Un fin passage. He has written three plays with the avant garde theatre company Moncton Sable. Daigle was formerly writer in residence at the University of Ottawa.

Daigle was awarded the 2011 Lieutenant-Governor's Award for High Achievement in the Arts for French Language Literary Arts. The following year he won the Governor General's Literary Prize in French fiction for his novel Pour sûr, the result of ten years of work.

Pour sûr was selected for the 2019 edition of Le Combat des livres, where it was defended by musician Édith Butler.

In 2022, Daigle came out as a non-binary trans male, stating that he would continue to use female pronouns professionally. Their transgender journey is discussed in Petit crayon pour faire mine.

In 2025, he was awarded the Blue Metropolis Violet Prize for his body of work.

== Publications ==
- Sans jamais parler du vent, (1983)
- Film d'amour et de dépendance, (1984)
- Histoire de la maison qui brûle, (1985)
- La Vraie Vie, (1993)
  - Real Life
- 1953: La Chronique d'une naissance annoncée, (1995)
  - 1953: Chronicle Of A Birth Foretold
- Pas pire (1998)
  - Just Fine (tr Robert Majzels, 1999, Anasi Press, winner of the Governor General's Award for French to English translation, 2000)
- Un fin passage (2001)
  - A Fine Passage (tr Robert Majzels, 2001) (shortlisted for The ReLit Awards, 2003)
- Petites difficultés d'existence (2002)
  - Life's Little Difficulties (tr Robert Majzels, 2004)
- Pour Sûr (2011), winner of the Governor General's Awards for Literary Merit for French fiction, 2012
  - For Sure (tr Robert Majzels, 2013)
- Poèmes pour les vieux couples (2016)
- Petit Crayon Pour Faire Mine (2024)

== Theatrical works ==
- Moncton sable (1997) Moncton Sable Theatre
- Craie (1999) Moncton Sable Theatre
- Foin (2000) presented by Moncton Sable Theatre
