= La Sagouine =

Play by Antonine Maillet

La Sagouine is a play written by New Brunswick author Antonine Maillet that tells the story of la Sagouine, an Acadian cleaning lady from rural New Brunswick. The play is a collection of monologues written in Acadian French. It has since been translated into English by Luis de Céspedes in 1984, and most recently by Wayne Grady in 2007, based on the second enlarged edition published in 1974 by Les Éditions Lemeac.

Viola Léger played the role of La Sagouine more than any other actor and appeared in more than 3,000 performances of the play from 1971 to 2013.
