= Mass media in Acadia =

From the mid-19th century onward

The press played a role in the development of Acadian culture from the mid-19th century onward and was often linked to political and economic aspirations. The minority status and comparatively limited resources of Acadians influenced the development of media in the region. (Note: Acadia roughly includes the north and east of the Canadian province of New Brunswick as well as more isolated localities in Prince Edward Island, Newfoundland and Labrador, and Nova Scotia. In a broader sense, Acadia also refers to Acadian diaspora communities located in Quebec and the United States; people of Acadian descent are also found in France, the Falkland Islands, and the West Indies. Acadia is not officially recognized but would constitute a nation through its language, culture, institutions, and symbols.)

From the founding of Le Moniteur acadien in 1867, Acadian journalism expanded across the Maritimes with titles such as L’Évangéline, L’Impartial, and Le Petit Courrier, despite frequent financial struggles and political and ideological divisions. The 20th century saw significant consolidation, culminating in the closure of L’Évangéline in 1982 and the subsequent creation of L’Acadie nouvelle, now the primary Acadian daily. Alongside regional weeklies, community radio, French-language broadcasting, and digital platforms have become key pillars of Acadian media. Although scholarship on the subject remains limited, existing studies highlight the press’s central role in cultural identity, linguistic preservation, and Acadian public life.

== Written press ==
=== Context ===
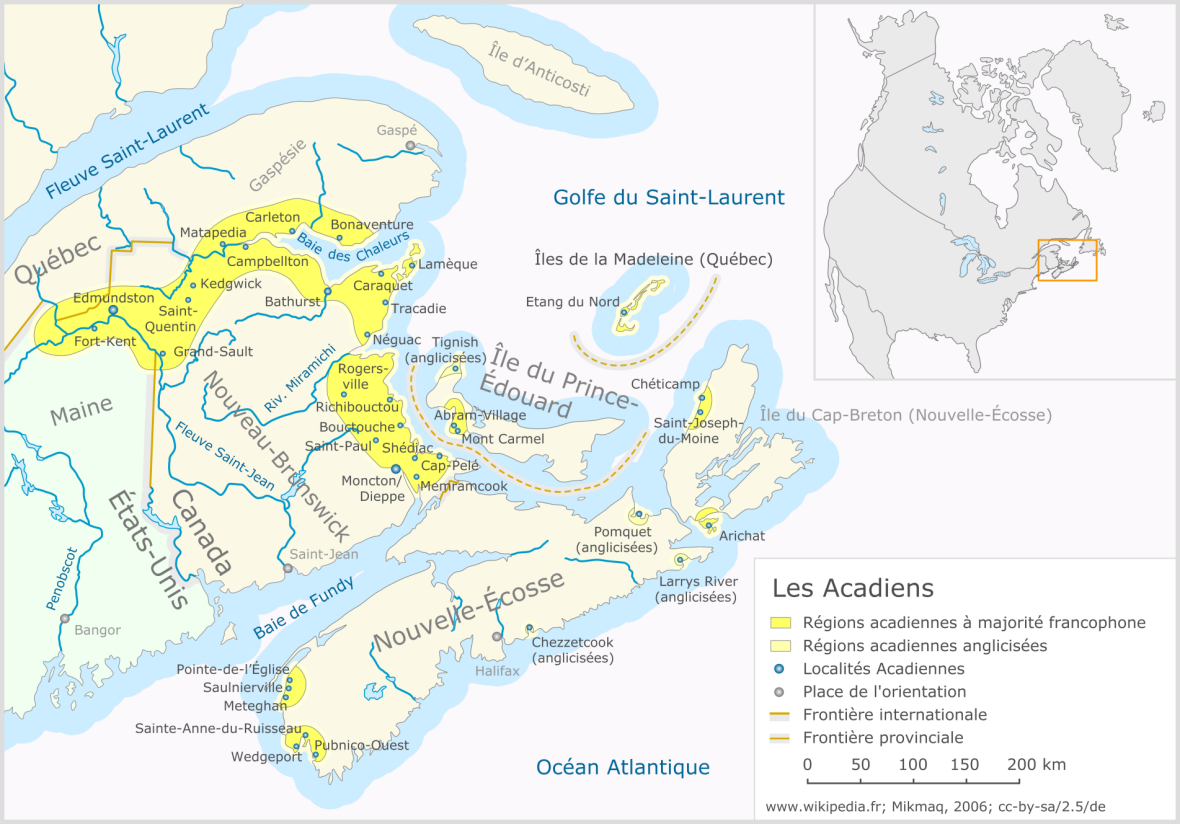
This map shows the main Acadian communities in Canada and the northern United States. There is also a significant community in the southern United States, in Louisiana.

The founding and sustainability of Acadian newspapers were influenced by factors such as demographic growth, population distribution, education levels, economic activity, transportation, and communications. At the beginning of the 20th century, Acadia had 11 newspapers, compared with 231 Franco-American and 50 Franco-Ontarian newspapers. Between 1871 and 1911, the population of French origin in Acadia increased significantly, by 120% in New Brunswick, 58% in Nova Scotia, and 41% in Prince Edward Island. Despite this growth, the development of the press was limited by the dispersed nature of the Acadian population. Large urban centers, generally favorable to newspaper development, contained relatively few Acadians. Educational shortcomings also played a role, with figures such as Israël Landry criticizing the lack of knowledge among Acadians and their limited interest in media. Financial constraints led to the closure of many newspapers. The location of printing facilities was also a determining factor, as inadequate transportation infrastructure in some regions made newspaper distribution difficult.

Before the founding of the first Acadian newspaper in 1867, English-language newspapers had been established in Nova Scotia since 1752, in New Brunswick since 1783, and in Prince Edward Island since 1787. By that time, 516 different titles had been published in the three provinces, including one in Gaelic and one in German. Saint John alone accounted for 135 of these publications.

=== Pioneer press ===
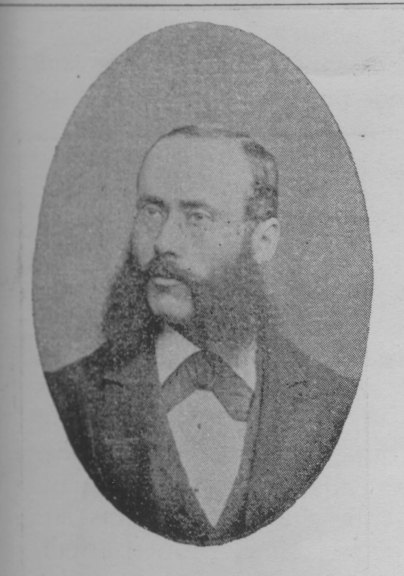
Israël Landry

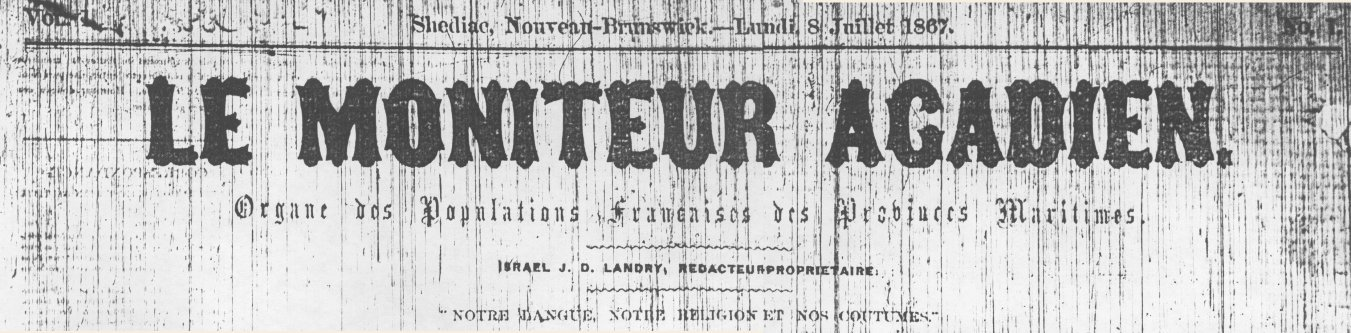
The header of the first issue of Le Moniteur acadien.

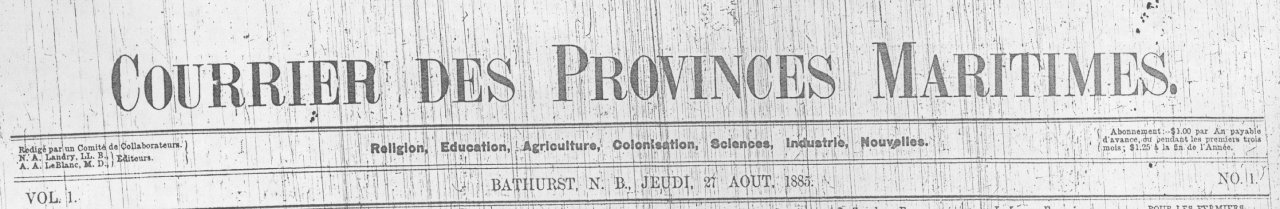
The first issue of the Maritime Provinces Courier.

Le Moniteur acadien, the first Acadian newspaper in Canada, (Note: The United States has had French-language newspapers since 1794.) was founded in Shédiac on 5 March 1867 by Israël Landry, a French Canadian from Quebec. At the time, Shédiac was a port town of about 5,000 inhabitants. The newspaper achieved some initial success as the only publication in the town, but Landry resigned a few months later due to financial difficulties, limited support from the Acadian elite, and criticism from the clergy regarding his polemical tone. Le Moniteur acadien was a politically engaged and conservative newspaper.

In 1869, A. Béchard announced plans to establish Le Réveil in Fredericton but abandoned the project due to limited subscriptions. Moïse Cormier later published L'Étoile du Nord for a short period in Saint John. The second lasting Acadian newspaper was Le Courrier des provinces maritimes, founded in 1885 in Bathurst by members of the Gloucester County elite, including Valentin Landry. In the first issue, Landry stated that the newspaper would defend Acadian interests and “would speak of religion, education, agriculture, colonization, science, and industry.” According to a study by Phylis Leblanc, however, little space was devoted to these topics. Subscriptions increased from 800 to 2,800 in 1887. The newspaper was sold to Peter Veniot in 1891 and later to Onésiphore Turgeon in 1900, who ended its publication in December 1903, likely for financial reasons.

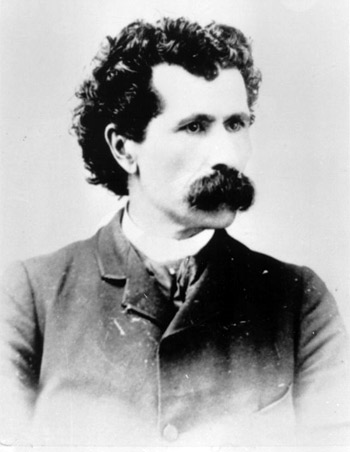
Valentin Landry.

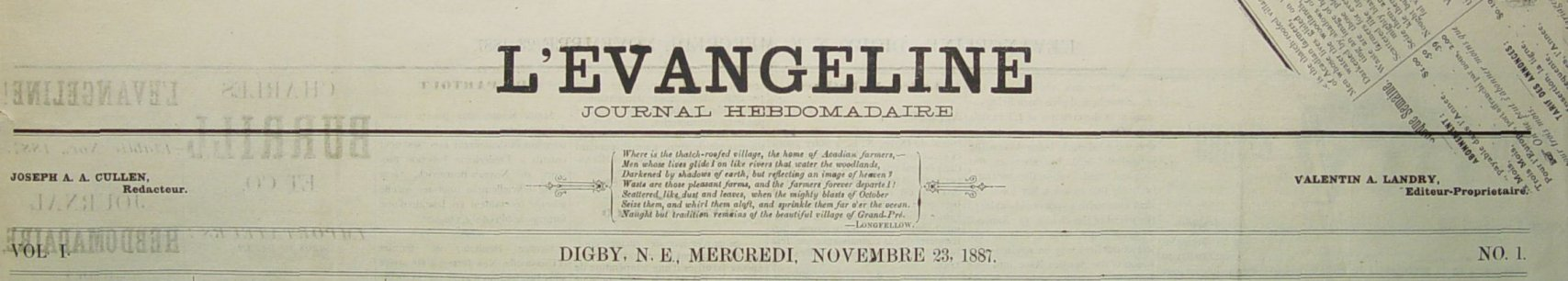
The first issue of L'Évangéline.

The first Acadian newspaper in Nova Scotia, L’Avenir, was founded in 1880 in Digby. After an initial disappearance, it was republished in Yarmouth before ceasing publication around 1883. L’Acadie libérale was published in Meteghan between 1890 and 1893 by J. B. de Vicq, a Belgian, who described it as a “country newspaper” that would include “nothing of a nature to offend morality and decency.”

After leaving Le Courrier des provinces maritimes, Valentin Landry founded L’Évangéline in Nova Scotia. The first issue, dated 23 November 1887, argued that the 41,000 Acadians in Nova Scotia and 10,000 in Prince Edward Island warranted a French-language newspaper, as New Brunswick’s 50,000 Acadians already had two. Landry chose Digby as the location for the printing press due to its accessibility by train and ferry, as well as his personal ties to the province, where he had studied and married the daughter of a legislator. He also noted the symbolic importance of its proximity to Port Royal, the first permanent settlement in Acadia, which may have influenced the choice of the title, inspired by the heroine of Henry Longfellow’s poem Evangeline. In its first issue, Landry declared his intention to cover subjects relevant to Acadians in Nova Scotia and beyond, while expressing his political views openly. In practice, the four-page newspaper primarily addressed agriculture and education, while also covering topics such as hygiene, language, religion, nationalism, colonization, emigration, and the condition of women. The content generally reflected the perspectives of the clergy and the Acadian elite, resembling other French-language newspapers in Canada.

L’Évangéline was generally well received, though it faced some criticism, including from the Windsor Tribune, which opposed “that separatist spirit which wants to maintain a French newspaper in our English-speaking colony of Nova Scotia.” (Note: Free translation of: “It is the separatist spirit that we think is manifested in the ambition to maintain a French newspaper in our English-speaking colony of Nova Scotia [...]”) The newspaper had 2,000 subscribers before its launch and gained nearly 800 more during its first year, with readership divided between Nova Scotia and New Brunswick, and additional subscribers in Prince Edward Island, Quebec, Ontario, the United States, and France. In 1889, Landry relocated the printing press to Weymouth, a predominantly French-speaking community with similar accessibility to Digby but lower living costs. At the same time, he acquired improved equipment to publish an English-language newspaper, the Weymouth Free Press.

The French-born Eudist priest Jules Lanos founded L’Acadie in Weymouth in 1900. In opposition to L’Évangéline, he criticized Valentin Landry and also established the Sissiboo Echo, an English-language rival to the Weymouth Free Press. The dispute was reflected in both publications, prompting commentary from other newspapers and calls from figures such as Pascal Poirier to end the quarrels. L’Acadie ceased publication in 1904, after which Landry relocated L’Évangéline to Moncton, New Brunswick.

In his editorial of 1 December 1904, Valentin Landry confirmed the relocation of L’Évangéline to Moncton, New Brunswick. He cited the city’s growing importance within Acadia and the limited prospects of Weymouth, which he considered too small and remote to ensure the newspaper’s survival. Landry noted that he had considered the move earlier but had delayed it due to the establishment of L’Acadie by Jules Lanos. The decision was also influenced by the refusal of the Nova Scotia government to grant a subsidy available to newspapers publishing the debates of the Legislative Assembly. Landry added that he chose not to move closer to Shédiac in order to avoid financially undermining Le Moniteur acadien, despite the fact that two-thirds of L’Évangéline’s readership was in New Brunswick.

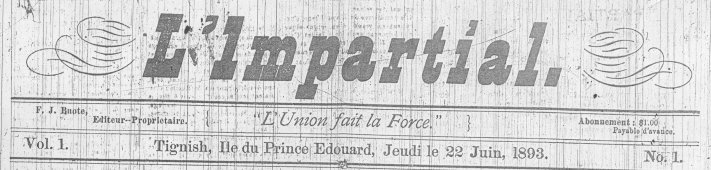
The first issue of L'Impartial.

Until 1893, the Acadians of Prince Edward Island relied on newspapers from New Brunswick and Nova Scotia. On 22 June 1893, Gilbert Buote founded L’Impartial in Tignish. The paper, intended to counter anglicization, was presented as politically neutral while defending Acadian interests. Its neutrality was questioned in 1896, when it supported the Conservative Party during the Manitoba Schools Question, and later the Liberal Party beginning in 1904, leading to a loss of subscribers. L’Impartial promoted the establishment of Acadian institutions, including the Association of Acadian Teachers, which became the main Acadian organization on the Island until the founding of the Société Saint-Thomas d’Aquin in 1919. After Gilbert Buote, the paper was directed by his son François Buote, who suspended publication in 1915. He died in 1921 while attempting to revive it. Studies of the newspaper’s content indicate that it frequently published articles on local history and genealogy.

=== 1905 to 1945 ===
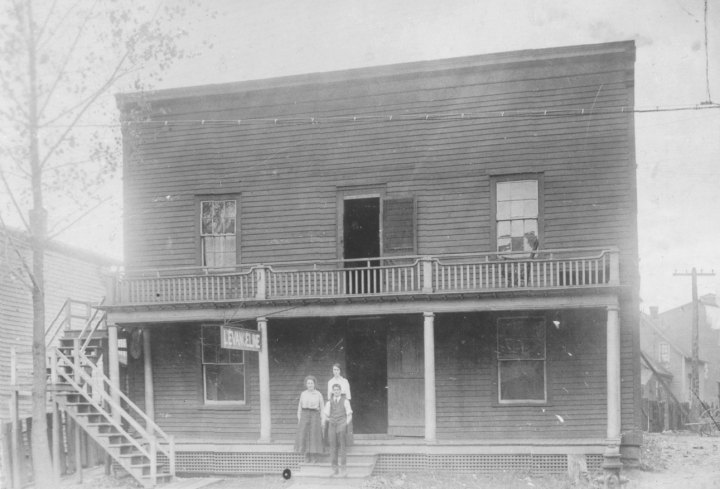
The first building occupied by L'Évangéline in Moncton.

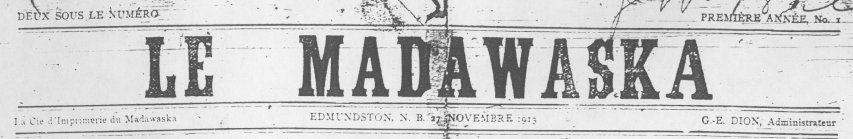
The first issue of Madawaska.

The relocation of L’Évangéline to Moncton in 1905, near Shédiac, did not appear to affect the sales of Le Moniteur acadien. The two newspapers maintained opposing political orientations, with L’Évangéline supporting the Liberal Party and Le Moniteur acadien aligned with the Conservative Party. The move was criticized by some readers in Nova Scotia.

The publication of Le Moniteur acadien was suspended on October 25, 1918, following the death of George-Antoine, son of its owner Fernand Robidoux. After Robidoux’s death in 1921, members of his family resumed publication from November 20, 1924, to January 7, 1926.

The Canada–United States border region of Madawaska developed an early interest in having a local newspaper. Le Journal du Madawaska was published in Van Buren, Maine, from 1902 to 1906. In November 1913, Albert-M. Sormany and Maximilien-D. Cormier founded Le Madawaska, a weekly of four pages in French with some English content. Joseph-Gaspard Boucher became its owner in 1926, and the paper has since remained under the direction of his descendants. The newspaper expressed Acadian nationalist positions, promoting the revitalization of the Société nationale de l’Acadie, encouraging celebrations of Acadian National Day, and supporting the insurance company Assumption Life, although it is unclear to what extent these views were shared by the broader population of Madawaska.

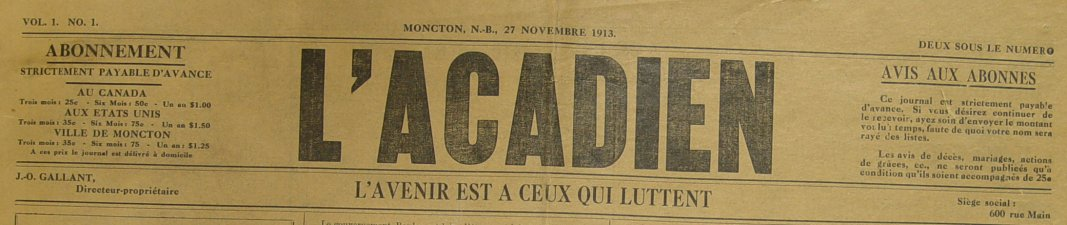
The first issue of L'Acadien.

Charles Guérin, a journalist at La Presse, decided to establish a newspaper for the Acadian population during a trip to Néguac. La Justice began publication as a weekly on April 12, 1912, using the printing facilities of an English-language newspaper in Miramichi. The venture quickly proved financially difficult, and Guérin associated himself with the teacher T.-D. Robichaud of Néguac, whom he did not personally know but who had defended La Justice against a correspondent from L’Évangéline. Robichaud managed the newspaper until 1907, when he lost access to a printer, and he later became a journalist at L’Évangéline in 1909. L’Acadien was founded in Moncton on November 27, 1913, with the stated aim of countering L’Évangéline, which some critics argued had become too conservative. The new newspaper was strongly politicized and often expressed opposition to both L’Évangéline and Le Moniteur acadien. It also attracted several former employees of L’Évangéline, along with a portion of its readership. Initially published as a weekly, L’Acadien became biweekly in 1915 and, after several interruptions, ceased publication permanently in 1926.

La Nation was a newspaper published in Moncton around 1929–1930. It was financed by the Conservative Party and edited by Fernand Robidoux, former owner of Le Moniteur acadien.

Following the relocation of L’Évangéline to Moncton in 1905, Nova Scotia was left without a French-language newspaper. On February 17, 1937, Désiré d’Éon founded Le Petit Courrier in West Pubnico. Published as a weekly of 8 to 12 pages, it continued until 1972 under d’Éon’s direction.

Archbishop Arthur Melanson, the first archbishop of Moncton, founded the religious newspaper L’Ordre social in August 1937. In 1944, it was merged with L’Évangéline, likely for financial reasons.

The magazine Vie Française, based in Quebec, began publishing information on the Acadians in 1944.

=== 1945 to the present ===
==== Evolution and closure of L’Évangéline ====
L’Évangéline became a biweekly in 1947, a triweekly in 1948, and a daily on September 12, 1949, reaching 8,000 subscribers. Despite this growth, it faced recurring financial deficits, which were partly offset by parish collections. In 1965, ownership was transferred to a subsidiary of Assumption Life, and in 1974 to the Œuvres de presses acadiennes, a nonprofit organization managed by Assumption Life and UNI Financial Cooperation. The paper was temporarily renamed Le Progrès-l’Évangéline between 1970 and 1972 and adopted a tabloid format in 1971. Subscriptions rose to 21,000 in 1980 before declining to 17,000 in 1982.

L’Évangéline influenced Acadian nationalism throughout its history, with its role particularly significant during the 1950s under the direction of Émery Leblanc, assisted by Jean Hubert and Euclide Daigle. In 1962, Jean Hubert described the paper as “not the Church’s newspaper but the newspaper of a people, a national press of a Catholic character since this people is Catholic.” That same year, Raymond Daigle, in a study of the paper’s editorials from the 1950s, observed that L’Évangéline emphasized the preservation of Acadian identity through faith, language, and ties to the past. He argued that the paper and the traditionalist Acadian elite fostered isolation, contributing to divisions between Acadians and Quebecers and later between francophones and anglophones. Daigle concluded that the newspaper had functioned as a bastion of traditional nationalism that could no longer maintain its influence. During the 1960s, younger generations, shaped by Quebec’s Quiet Revolution, distanced themselves from this legacy and some advocated replacing the term “Acadian” with “francophone.”

L’Évangéline ceased publication on September 27, 1982.

According to Marc Johnson, the closure was due to the newspaper’s inability to adapt to the requirements of modern information.

==== Other newspapers ====
The first Acadian newspaper founded after the Second World War was the Tracadie News, a bilingual publication that lasted only a few issues in 1947. Another bilingual newspaper, The Cataract – La Cataracte, was established in Grand Falls in 1952 and continues to be published. L’Aviron, a 12–16 page French-language tabloid, was created in 1962 in Campbellton by Rachel and Fernand Guérette. It served northern New Brunswick and the Gaspé region and maintained its popularity despite changes in ownership and its division into two separate editions. During the same period, Caraquet became a center of newspaper activity. Le Voilier was launched as a monthly in 1965 by Corinne Blanchard, purchased by Léandre Ferron in 1969, and transformed into a weekly in 1973. In 1977, Alphé Michaud and his associates acquired Le Voilier and the Bathurst Tribune, which included a French-language section. The group replaced the Bathurst Tribune with Le Point, published in Bathurst. In 1983, Michaud merged Le Voilier and Le Point under the title Le Voilier – Le Point, possibly to fill the gap left by the closure of L’Évangéline. He also launched Le Week-end, a weekend paper, in 1984. Competitive pressures led to the closure of Le Voilier – Le Point in February 1988. Le Voilier briefly reappeared in Caraquet in August 1988 but ceased publication again in July 1990. In 1971, Yvon Laliberté had founded Le Journal acadien in Caraquet to compete with Le Voilier, but it did not succeed.

The weekly newspaper Le Radar was founded in 1972 in the Magdalen Islands.

At the Université de Moncton, several student newspapers were established, including L’Embryon in 1970 and La Jaunisse in 1973. The latter was reorganized and renamed Le Front in 1977. Le Front continues to be published as a weekly in both print and digital formats.

In 1972, Cyrille Leblanc founded Imprimerie Lescarbot and acquired the business of Désiré d’Éon, founder of Le Petit Courrier. The publication was relocated to Yarmouth and renamed Le Courrier de la Nouvelle-Écosse to serve as a provincial newspaper. In 1987, seventeen provincial and local associations created the Société de presse acadienne, a non-profit organization, which acquired the shares of Désiré Leblanc and became the owner of Imprimerie Lescarbot. By 1991, Le Courrier had a circulation of 4,000 copies, distributed across Acadian communities in Nova Scotia.

In the summer of 1975, the Société Saint-Thomas d’Aquin launched La Voix acadienne, a monthly newspaper intended for the Acadian population of Prince Edward Island. The newspaper described itself as “the voice of the community, its conscience, its source of new ideas […] watchdog of the community’s interests.” It became a weekly in 1976 and, by 1991, had a print run of 1,200 copies, including 225 subscribers outside the province.

La Boueille was founded in 1975 in Cap-Pelé by Bernard Richard. Initially a bi-monthly and later a weekly, the newspaper was purchased by Alphé Michaud of Caraquet and subsequently moved to Shédiac. It ceased publication in 1981, attributed to the publisher’s distance and financial difficulties. Its closure, along with that of L’Évangéline, led the cultural committee of the Batture in Shédiac to establish a free weekly in the summer of 1983, which resumed publication the following year with paid staff. The company was incorporated in 1985, and the newspaper was renamed Le Moniteur, before adopting the name of the oldest Acadian newspaper founded in Shédiac in 1867, Le Moniteur acadien. Other regional publications included Pro-Kent, founded in Richibucto in 1985, and L’Express du Sud-Est, launched in 1987 and relocated to Moncton in 1988.

Since 1991, L’Action régionale has been published weekly in Grand Falls, in competition with The Cataract – La Cataracte.

==== Replacement of L’Évangéline ====
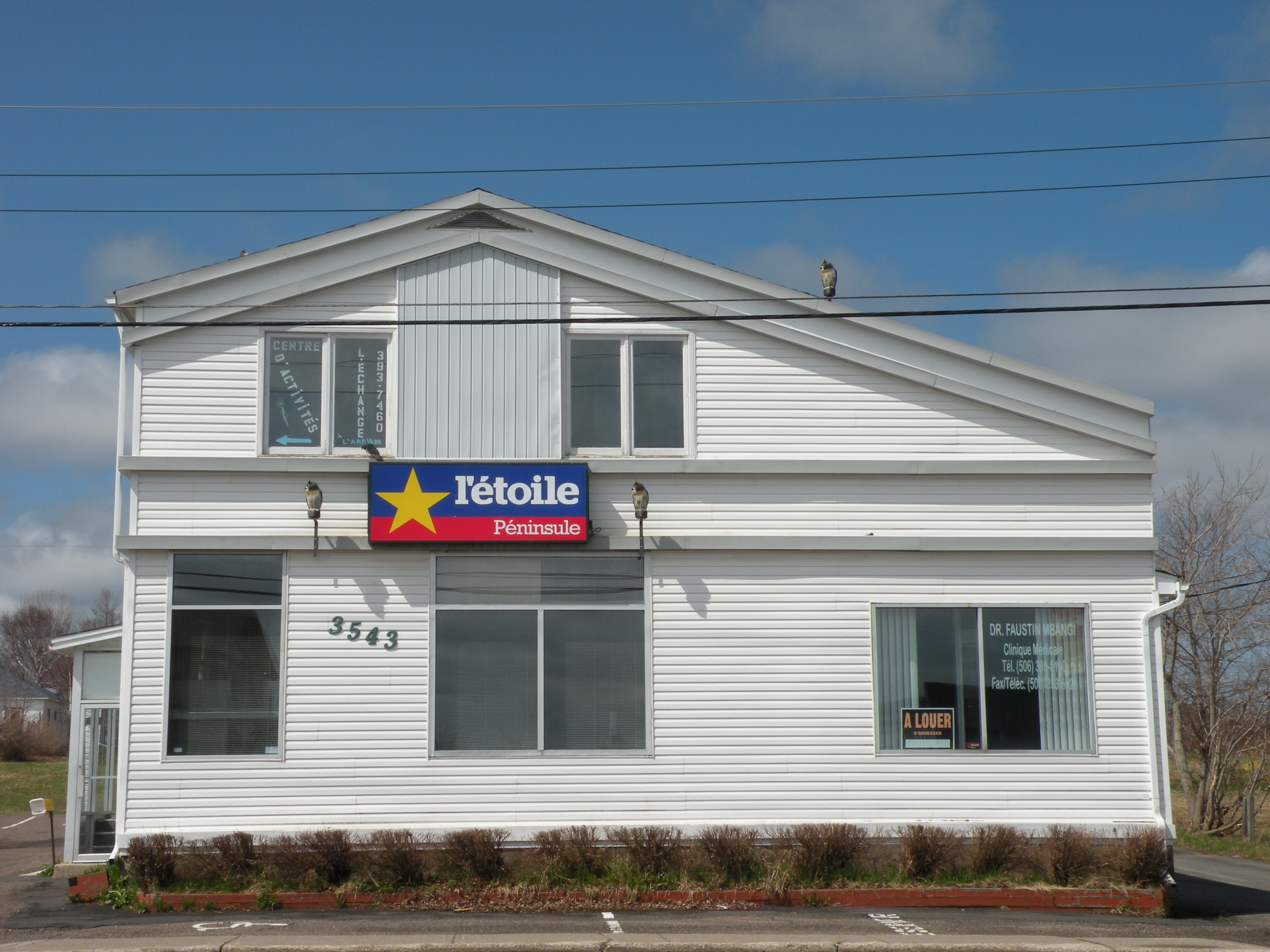
Premises of L'Étoile Péninsule, in Tracadie-Sheila.

The end of L’Évangéline on September 27, 1982, generated surprise and contributed to the absence of initiatives to preserve the newspaper. A commission of inquiry subsequently determined that a provincial newspaper could not operate without subsidies, leading the federal and provincial governments to create a corporation to establish a new publication and a trust fund of $6 million dedicated to its distribution. After raising $250,000, a group of businessmen founded the daily L’Acadie nouvelle in Caraquet in 1984, which initially received a mixed reception. Le Matin was launched on August 11, 1986, and distributed across New Brunswick, but its circulation declined from 20,000 to 8,000 during its first year, and despite attempts by Senator J.-M. Simard to prevent bankruptcy, it ceased publication on June 29, 1988. Efforts by a group of southeastern citizens, supported by the Unimédia group, to relaunch the newspaper were halted when Premier Frank McKenna transferred the trust fund to L’Acadie nouvelle. Following these developments, L’Acadie nouvelle gradually extended its distribution throughout the province, with circulation rising from 5,500 copies in 1984 to 18,500 in 1991. To strengthen its presence in the south, it opened an office in Dieppe in 1992, employing 14 people, and later established advertising branches in Tracadie-Sheila and Bathurst. In 2002, the newspaper acquired its own printing press, Acadie Presse, and in August 2003 launched a Saturday edition, which achieved immediate success.

In 2009, L’Acadie nouvelle was affected by the economic crisis, with a 10% decline in sales, resulting in six layoffs, salary reductions, and the suspension of publication on public holidays. At that time, Brunswick News owned three of New Brunswick’s four daily newspapers as well as two-thirds of its weeklies, a concentration of ownership that several public figures criticized, particularly in relation to the editorial stance of its publications on issues such as access to health care in French. On August 6, 2009, the weekly L’Étoile, previously published by Brunswick News in southeastern New Brunswick, became a free provincial newspaper with a circulation of 100,000 copies. The management of L’Acadie nouvelle indicated it was not concerned by this new competitor. The following month, journalist and activist Jean-Marie Nadeau moved from L’Acadie nouvelle to L’Étoile, a decision that drew criticism. In the same period, an agreement was signed between the Société nationale de l’Acadie and L’Acadie nouvelle, allowing the daily to publish weekly news about Acadian communities outside New Brunswick.

== Radio ==
The first Canadian radio station, CFCF, was inaugurated in 1919, and the first English-language stations in the Maritimes appeared in the 1920s. In 1924, Canadian National established a national radio network, with one of its first stations, CNRA, (Note: A stands for Acadia.) located in Moncton. French-language programming was produced in Montreal and rebroadcast in Moncton. These stations attracted large audiences until the emergence of powerful American stations. Radio-Canada was created in 1932, but its French-language network was initially limited to Quebec. In 1933, Dr. Carl Houde founded CHNC, a French-language station in New Carlisle, Quebec, which could be received across the Maritimes and remained the only unilingual French station for two decades. While remaining privately owned, it became a Radio-Canada affiliate in 1947. In Edmundston, CJEM-FM began broadcasting in 1944, though with limited range. The lack of an Acadian station led to public mobilization, with L’Évangéline supporting the issue and Acadian leaders pressing the federal government. In 1950, Clément Cormier and Calixte Savoie presented a memorandum to the Massey Commission advocating for a French-language radio service for Acadians. The commission’s 1951 report recommended the creation of a station, and CBAF was founded in Moncton in 1954. The proportion of local programming increased gradually, and a network of relay stations was established in 1959 to serve Acadian regions outside Moncton’s broadcast range. The first private French-language station, CJVA-AM, was founded in Caraquet in 1977, followed by another AM station in Moncton between 1980 and 1983. Northern New Brunswick was later served by CKLE in Bathurst, launched in 1987, which absorbed CJVA. Community radio developed in subsequent years, with CKUM-FM, the student station of the Université de Moncton, broadcasting beyond the campus since 1982. CKRO in Pokemouche was established in 1988, followed in 1991 by the CFAI network in Edmundston, Grand Falls, and Kedgwick. CKJM began broadcasting in Chéticamp in 1992 and later extended coverage to Pomquet.

== Television ==
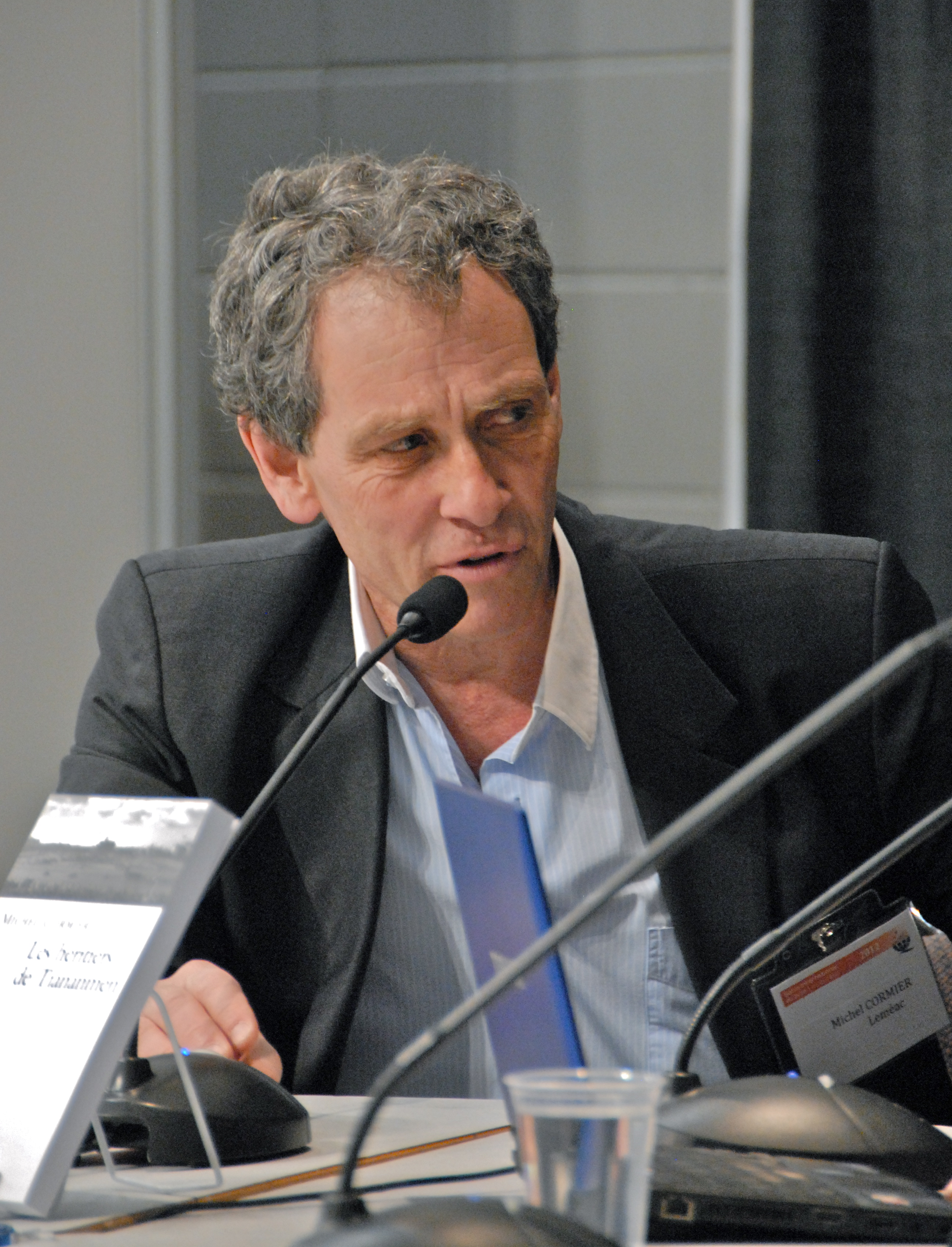
Journalist Michel Cormier.

In 1956, Acadian leaders presented requests to the Fowler Commission, which published its report in 1957. Following its recommendations, the Canadian Broadcasting Corporation opened a television station in Moncton. The station operated at low power, serving only the southeast of New Brunswick, and did not initially produce programming. In the same year, Charles Houde, who had previously founded the CHNC radio station, established CHAU-TV in New Carlisle with J. Léo Hachey of Bathurst. A production studio was inaugurated in Moncton in 1970.

In 1978, the Société des Acadiens et Acadiennes du Nouveau-Brunswick (SAANB), with financial support from the Government of Quebec, commissioned a study on media in Acadia. Conducted by Francine Lalonde, the study concluded that media services were inadequate and proposed a development plan. It noted that the media image was largely influenced by English, Quebec, and American cultures. In 2007, the Société nationale de l’Acadie (SNA) presented a study arguing that Radio-Canada Television devoted disproportionate attention to Quebec compared with other francophone communities in Canada. In 2008, Radio-Canada Atlantique was renamed Radio-Canada Acadie, and its edition of Le Téléjournal became Le Téléjournal-Acadie. In April 2009, a study from the Université de Moncton, presented by the SNA, criticized the limited coverage of the Atlantic provinces and Acadia in Le Téléjournal, compared with the English-language program The National. Both studies were criticized by Radio-Canada, which nonetheless stated that it would take them into account. In March 2009, the Canadian Broadcasting Corporation cut 800 jobs, including 10 in Acadia, which led to the cancellation or reduction of several programs.

== Internet ==
In 1998, UNI Financial Cooperation launched its corporate website along with the portal Acadie.net. On November 15 of the same year, CapAcadie.com was created as a university project by Nadine Léger. The portal was redesigned and relaunched on January 18, 2000, and beginning on May 22 of that year, it started including news from several media outlets, including L’Acadie nouvelle, CJSE, CKRO, and Cédici. Promenade Acadie, considered the first online shopping site in the region, was created in 2000. In 2002, the Guide de l’Acadie was added to Acadie.net, bringing together articles on Acadian history, culture, and communities. In 2007, Les Éditions de l’Acadie nouvelle (1984) Ltd. and the marketing firm Bristol founded CapAcadie Inc., with the goal of making CapAcadie.com a more dynamic platform. On January 21, 2009, ahead of the 5th Acadian World Congress, the news portal CapAcadie.com was merged with Acadie.net, which had been transferred by UNI Coopération financière.

There is no television station specifically dedicated to Acadian programming. In response, CapAcadie.com launched CapTV in January 2009. The first clips focused on the Pays de la Sagouine, and by July of that year the site had recorded 1.2 million visits, including 300,000 for the series Acadieman vs le CMA 2009. The first regular season was launched on November 16, 2009.

On August 8, 2013, the Facebook page Les Niaiseries acadiennes was created in Le Goulet, New Brunswick. Its initial aim was to entertain the population of the Acadian Peninsula by presenting themes related to various aspects and attractions of the region and of New Brunswick. The page later gained popularity among Acadian communities more broadly.

== Current situation ==
=== Newspapers ===
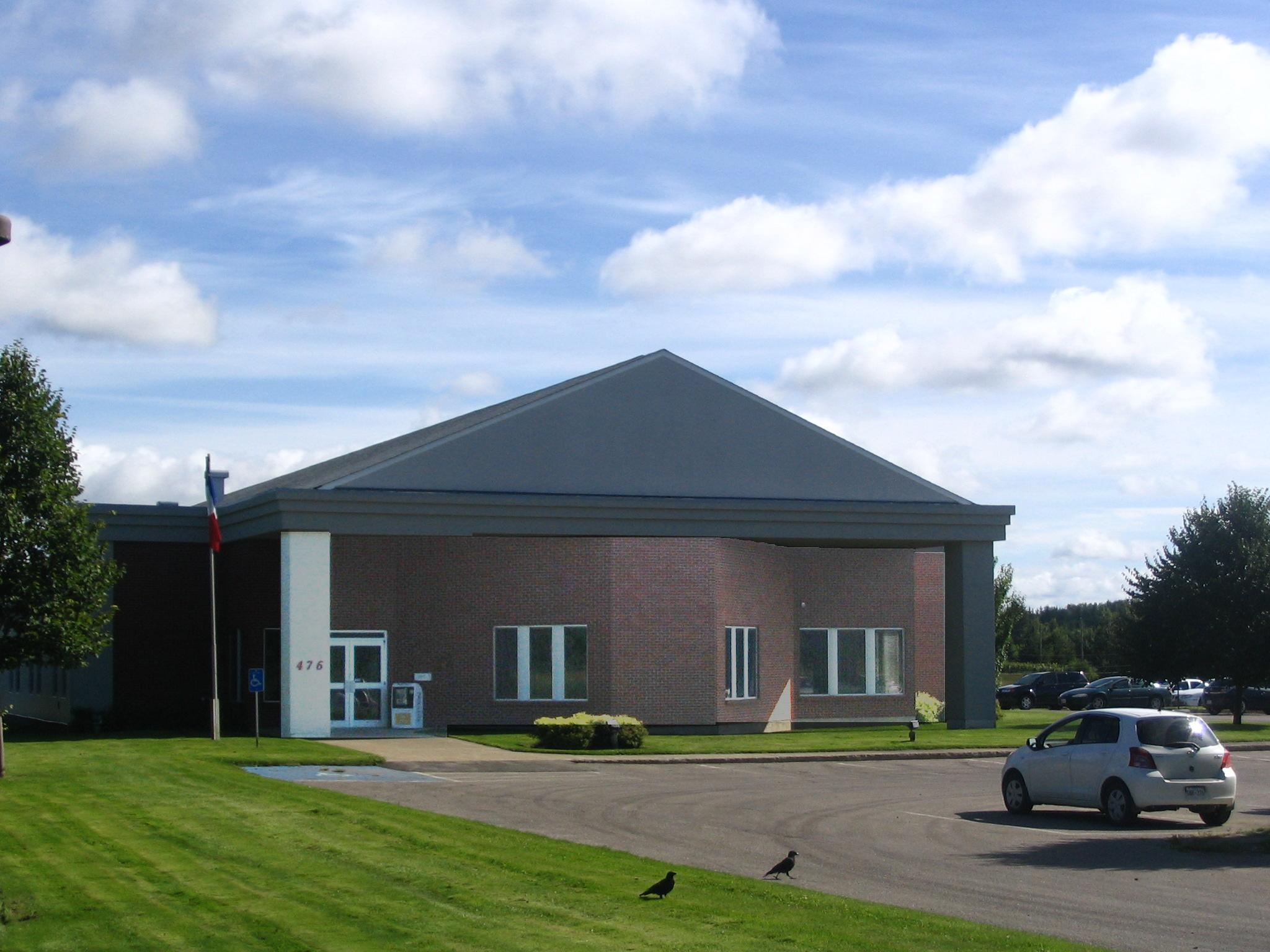
Headquarters of L'Acadie Nouvelle.

The daily newspaper L’Acadie nouvelle is published in Caraquet and distributed throughout New Brunswick, with a circulation of 21,000 copies on weekdays and 24,000 on Saturdays. It employs more than 125 people and operates four offices. The weekly Le Moniteur acadien has been published in Shédiac since 1867. Brunswick News publishes several French-language weeklies, including La Cataracte in Grand Falls, l’Hebdo Chaleur in Bathurst, La République and Le Madawaska in Edmundston, and La Voix du Restigouche in Campbellton, which also serves the Acadian population of Gaspésie. In addition, L’Étoile is published in three editions in Dieppe, Kent, and Shédiac. The Université de Moncton has two student newspapers: L’Oculus in Edmundston and l’Hebdo Campus in Moncton. The publishing house Cédici, based in Bas-Caraquet, produces monthly newspapers in Bas-Caraquet, Lamèque, Le Goulet, Miramichi, Sainte-Marie-Saint-Raphaël, Rogersville, Shippagan, Tracadie-Sheila, and Bathurst. Le Saint-Jeannois serves as a community newspaper for Francophones in the Greater Saint John area. Vibrant is a bilingual health magazine published in southeastern New Brunswick by Brunswick News in collaboration with the South-East Regional Health Authority. Welcome, also published by Brunswick News, is a bilingual entertainment magazine issued monthly in Moncton, with an English-only edition published in Fredericton.

In Nova Scotia, the French-language weekly Le Courrier de la Nouvelle-Écosse is published in La Butte. Prince Edward Island is served by La Voix acadienne, published in Summerside. In Newfoundland and Labrador, Le Gaboteur is published 21 times per year.

=== Television ===
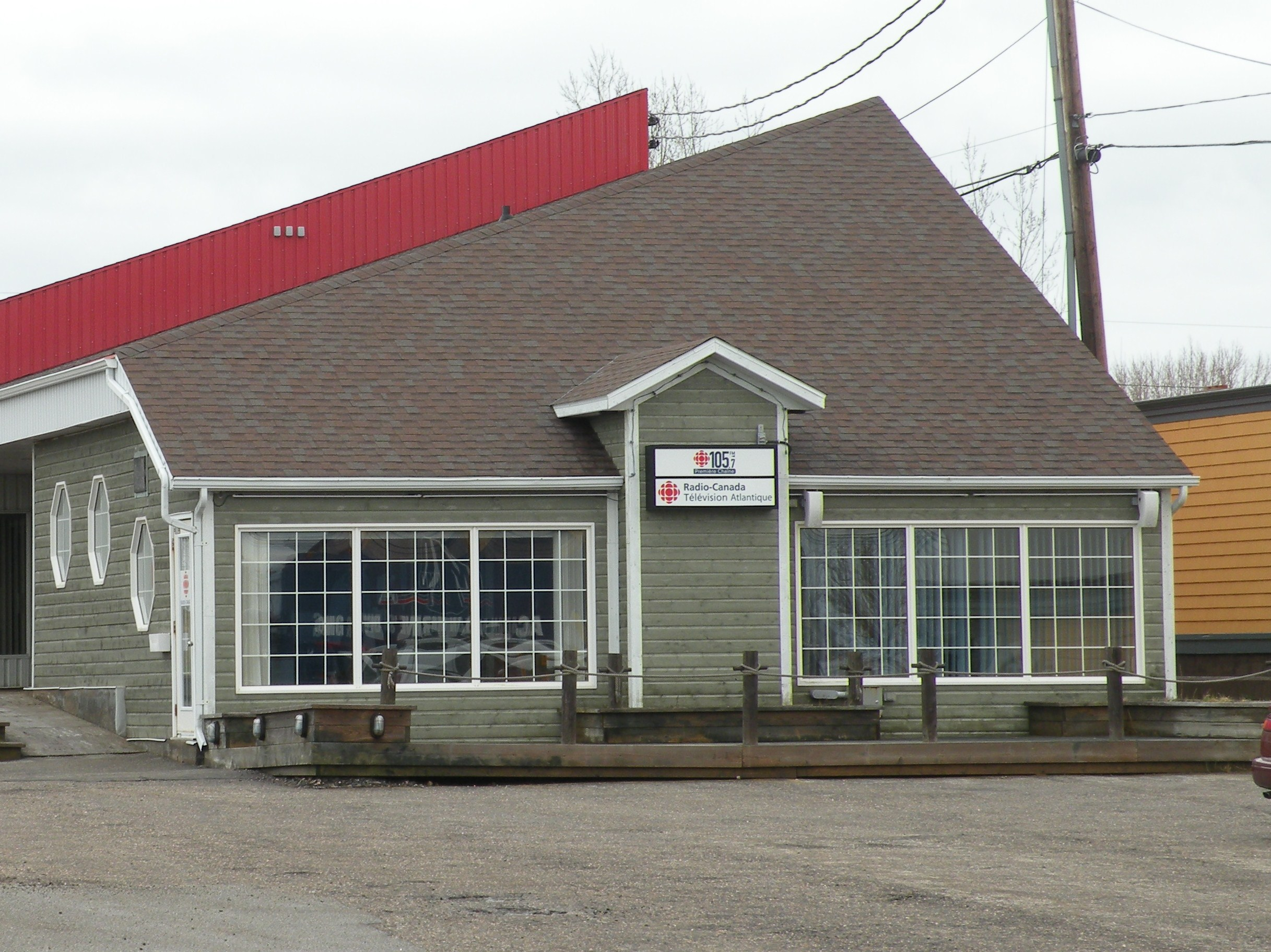
Radio-Canada Acadie offices in Caraquet.

The Radio-Canada television station CBAFT-DT broadcasts throughout eastern Canada and maintains local offices in Bouctouche, Caraquet, and Moncton. In Quebec, several French-language channels are available, including the TVA network and its regional station CHAU-TV, which offers programming for the Acadian communities of Chaleur Bay. The community network TV Rogers operates stations in Caraquet, Moncton, Bathurst, and Edmundston. Cable services also provide access to TV5 Québec Canada and Saint Pierre and Miquelon I. In Nova Scotia, the community of Chéticamp is served by CHNE-TV. Alongside these French-language options, English-language networks such as CBC Television, CTV, and Global also have significant audiences.

=== Internet ===
In addition to CapAcadie.com, Jminforme.ca, owned by Brunswick News, provides French-language news for Atlantic Canada, drawing content from the company’s newspapers and from the Canadian Press.

== Culture ==
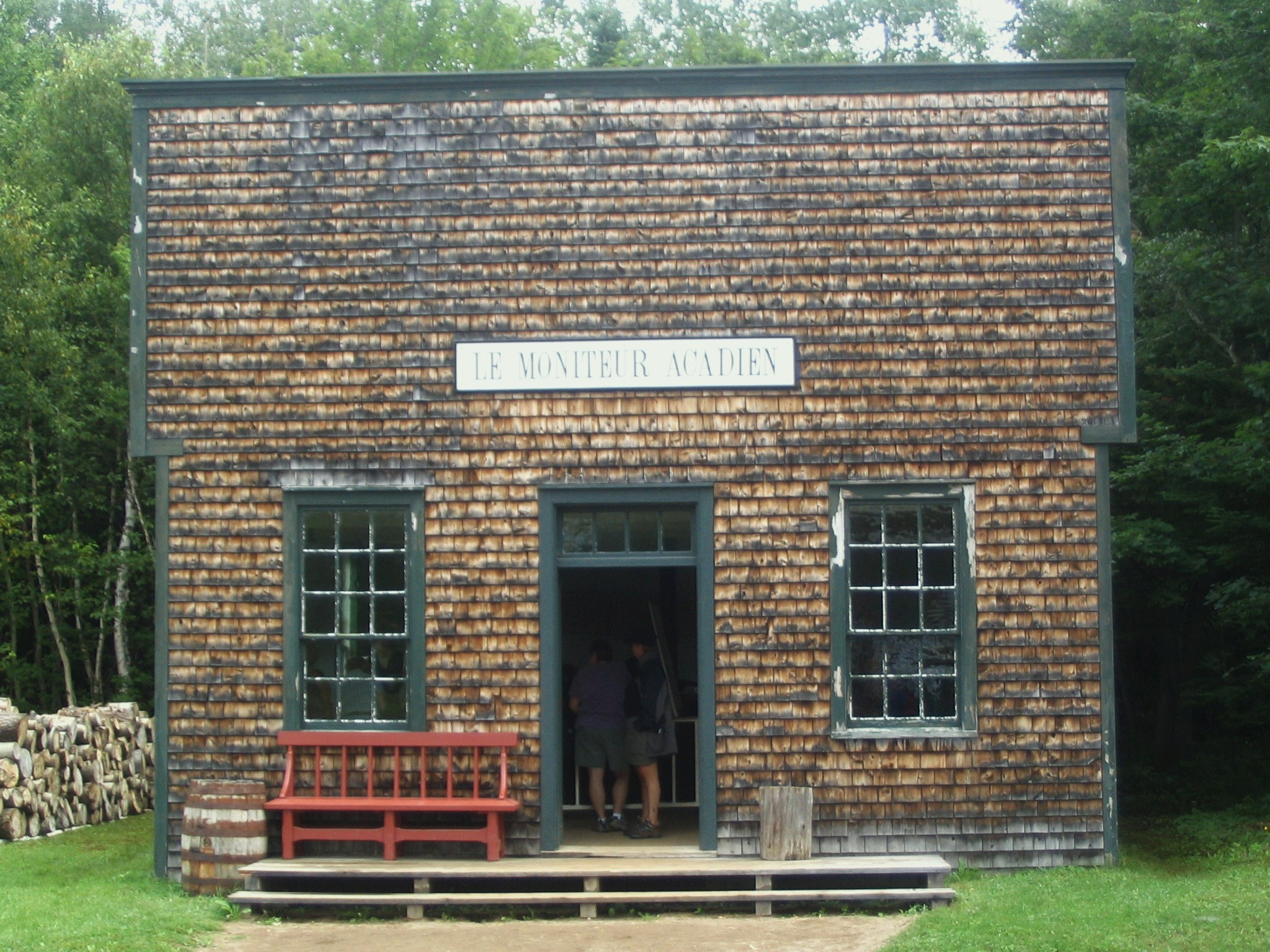
The original building of Le Moniteur acadien.

The media hold a place in Acadian culture. In Acadieman vs. le C.M.A. 2009, the fictional channel “TV-Acadie” is featured, and the main character appears on a parody of Tout le monde en parle.

== Historiography ==
The Acadian press has received limited scholarly attention. Some works have been published since the 1960s, including Les Moyens d’information by René Beaudry (1966) and État des recherches sur la presse française en Acadie by Roger Lacerte (1975). The first general study, Les médias en Acadie, was conducted in 1993 by Gérard Beaulieu. Each Maritime province maintains an index of its newspapers, and complete collections of certain publications are available. A full inventory of L’Évangéline was compiled by the Centre d’études acadiennes.

== See also ==
- Mass media in Algeria
- Mass media in Cameroon
- Mass media in the Democratic Republic of the Congo
- Mass media in Ivory Coast
- Mass media in Cuba
- Media of Scotland
- Mass media in Eritrea
- Mass media in Ethiopia
- Mass media in Iran
- Mass media in Iceland
- Mass media in Mali
- Mass media in Morocco
- List of Quebec media
- Mass media in Russia
- Mass media in Senegal
- Mass media in Venezuela

== Bibliography ==
- Collectif (1997). L'Évangéline, 1887-1982 : entre l'élite et le peuple [L'Évangéline, 1887-1982: between the elite and the people] (in French). Moncton: Éditions d'Acadie. ISBN 2-7600-0354-X.
- Beaulieu, Gérard (1993). L'Acadie des Maritimes [Acadia in the Maritimes] (in French). Moncton: Chaire d'études acadiennes, Université de Moncton. pp. 505–542.
- Deveau, Alphonse (1992). Valentin Landry (1844-1919) : à la barre de l'Évangéline [Valentin Landry (1844–1919): at the helm of the Evangeline] (in French). Moncton: Éditions de la Francophonie. ISBN 2-7600-0214-4.
- Landry, Michelle; Pépin-Filion, Dominique; Massicotte, Julien (2021). L'état de l'Acadie [The State of Acadia] (in French). Montreal: De Busso. pp. 230–272. ISBN 9782925079224.
