= Acadian culture =

Culture of the Acadia region in Canada

The Acadian culture (Note: The region of Acadia encompasses the northern and eastern regions of the Canadian province of New Brunswick, as well as more isolated localities in Prince Edward Island, Newfoundland and Labrador, and Nova Scotia. In a broader sense, the term "Acadia" is also used to refer to the communities of the Acadian diaspora located in Quebec and the United States. Individuals of Acadian descent can also be found in France, the Falkland Islands, and the West Indies. While not officially recognized, the Acadian nation would be constituted through its language, culture, institutions, and symbols.) has several characteristics that distinguish it from other regions of Canada.

== Symbols ==
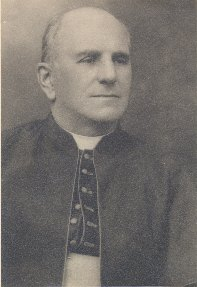
Marcel-François Richard, the instigator of many of the national symbols.

=== Patron saint and national holiday ===
The patron saint of Acadia, Our Lady of the Assumption, was the inaugural symbol selected during the inaugural Acadian National Convention, convened in 1881 in Memramcook. This choice is not surprising, given that France was under the protection of the Virgin Mary during the founding of Acadia. Furthermore, Acadia's national holiday was also chosen during the first Acadian National Convention. A debate ensued between June 24, Saint-Jean-Baptiste Day, and August 15, the day of the Assumption, a national holiday of French Canadians. Ultimately, due to the insistence of Marcel-François Richard, the delegates voted in favor of August 15.

=== Flag ===
Acadian flag.

The flag of Acadia, or the Starred Tricolor, was first proposed by Father Marcel-François Richard on August 15, 1884, during the second Acadian National Convention held in Miscouche, Prince Edward Island. The flag was formally adopted the following day. The flag consist of the French flag with a golden star, or Stella Maris, in the blue section. The star represents the Virgin Mary, and its color is associated with the papacy, signifying the attachment of the Acadians to the Catholic religion and the importance of the Church in the history of Acadia. The original flag, embroidered by Marie Babineau, is preserved at the Acadian Museum of the University of Moncton. Currently, the flag is the most widely recognized symbol of Acadia.

=== Anthem ===
The national anthem of Acadia was selected during the 1884 Convention. The anthem consists of a Latin text, Ave maris stella. The anthem was first sung by Marcel-François Richard during the inaugural raising of the Acadian flag. It was subsequently proposed by Pierre-Amand Landry as a national symbol and was adopted unanimously by the delegates. It supplanted the disparate patriotic melodies that were in vogue at the time, including La Marseillaise. This anthem has been the subject of controversy since its inception because some individuals are opposed to the idea of a religious song being played during celebrations where alcohol is consumed. In 1994, the Acadian National Society held a competition to create French lyrics for the anthem; the winner was Jacinthe Laforest, and the new version was first performed by Lina Boudreau.

=== Other holidays ===
In Canada July 28 has been designated as the "Day of Commemoration of the Great Upheaval" since 2005. This commemorative day marks the date in 1755 when the decision was made to deport the Acadians. December 13, Acadian Remembrance Day, commemorates the memory of the 2,000 Acadians who perished in the North Atlantic from hunger, disease, and drowning during the deportation. Individuals commemorate the event by wearing a black star.

=== Other symbols ===
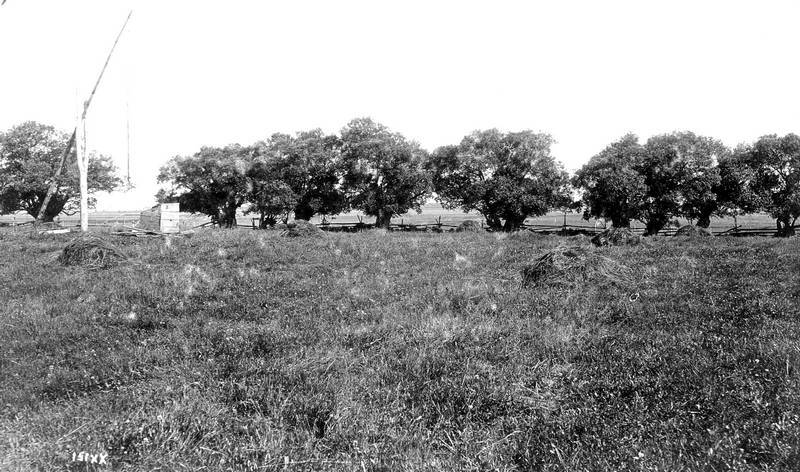
Grand-Pré's willows in the early 20th century.

The motto of Acadia is L'union fait la force, which translates to "Union Makes Strength" in English. The Acadian insignia comprises a blue silk band surmounted by a star encircled by rays, situated above a boat sailing with full sails. The flag bears the word "Acadie" in the center. The national motto is inscribed beneath the depicted vessel, and the entire emblem is surmounted by a rosette of red and white. The insignia is to be worn in the buttonhole on designated holidays. The two symbols were selected during the Acadian National Convention of 1884. It is conceivable that the delegates sought to emulate the symbols selected during a Saint-Jean-Baptiste Congress convened in Quebec four years prior. The motto is seldom employed. The insignia has not been widely embraced and is now largely overlooked, with only a single example preserved at the Acadian Museum of the University of Moncton. Nevertheless, the insignia served as the inspiration for the coat of arms of the Acadian National Society, which was unveiled in 1996 in Miscouche.

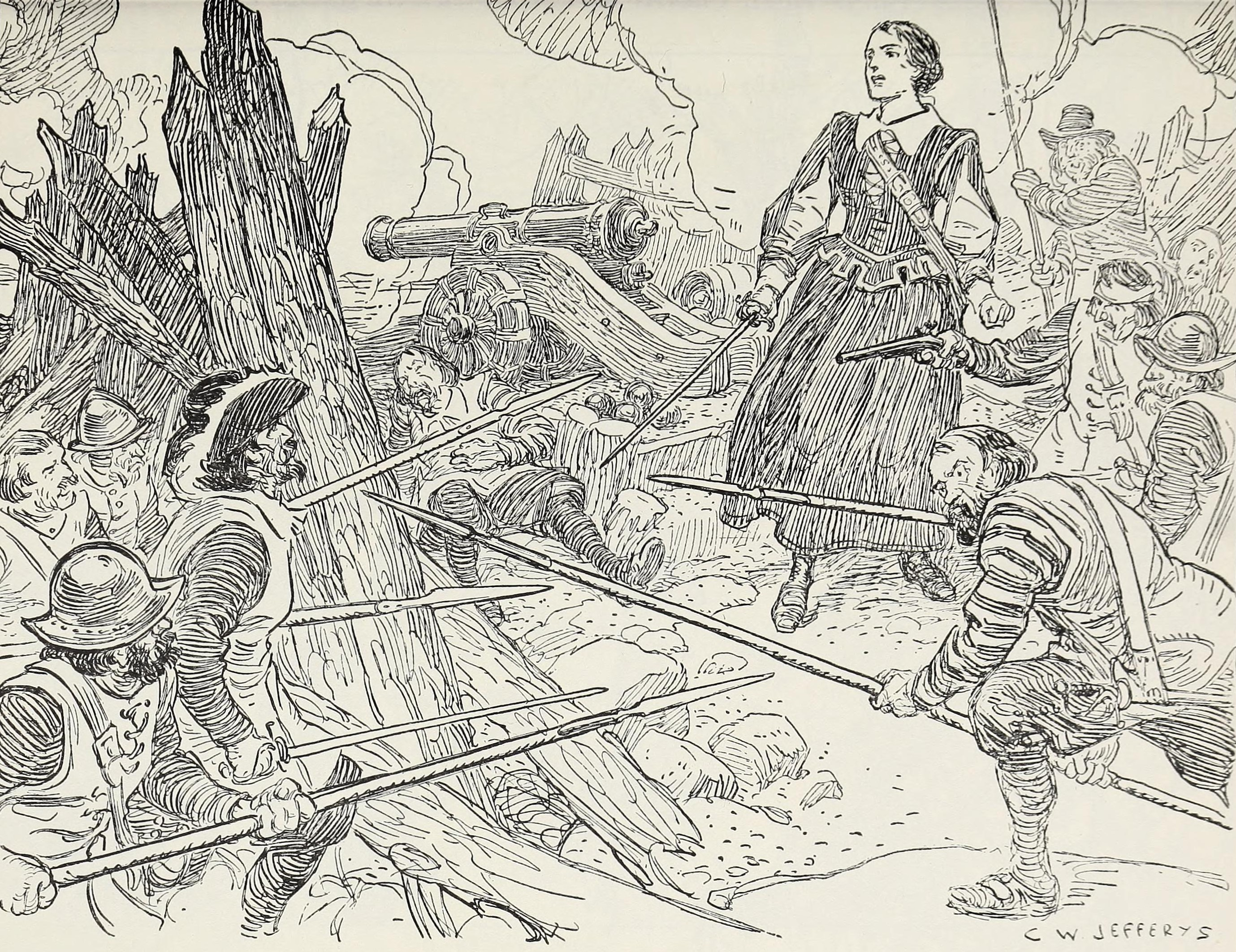
Françoise-Marie Jacquelin defending Fort La Tour.

There are numerous additional unofficial symbols. One of the earliest examples is the poem Evangeline by American author Henry Longfellow, first published in 1847. Annually, several communities organize contests to select a Gabriel and an Evangeline, the two principal characters of the poem. The lighthouse is a traditional architectural, craft, and artistic motif among the Acadians. The Acadian monument in Quebec depicts a lighthouse surmounted by a star. The willow is said to represent the site of an ancient Acadian settlement. Grand-Pré features centuries-old willows that inspired the novel Le saule de Grand-Pré by René Verville.

The history of Acadia is replete with examples of heroic figures. Some are renowned for their military achievements, such as Françoise-Marie Jacquelin for her defense of Fort La Tour against Charles de Menou d'Aulnay, Joseph Brossard (or Broussard) called Beausoleil for his resistance during the Deportation of the Acadians, and Louis Mailloux, who was killed during a shooting while defending Catholic and French-language schools in Caraquet. Other noteworthy figures include Tante Blanche and Henriette Pelletier in Madawaska, Édith Pinet, and Stanislas-Joseph Doucet in the Acadian Peninsula, who are recognized for their contributions to medicine and humanitarianism. Yvon Durelle is regarded as a hero for his achievements in sports.

=== Religion ===
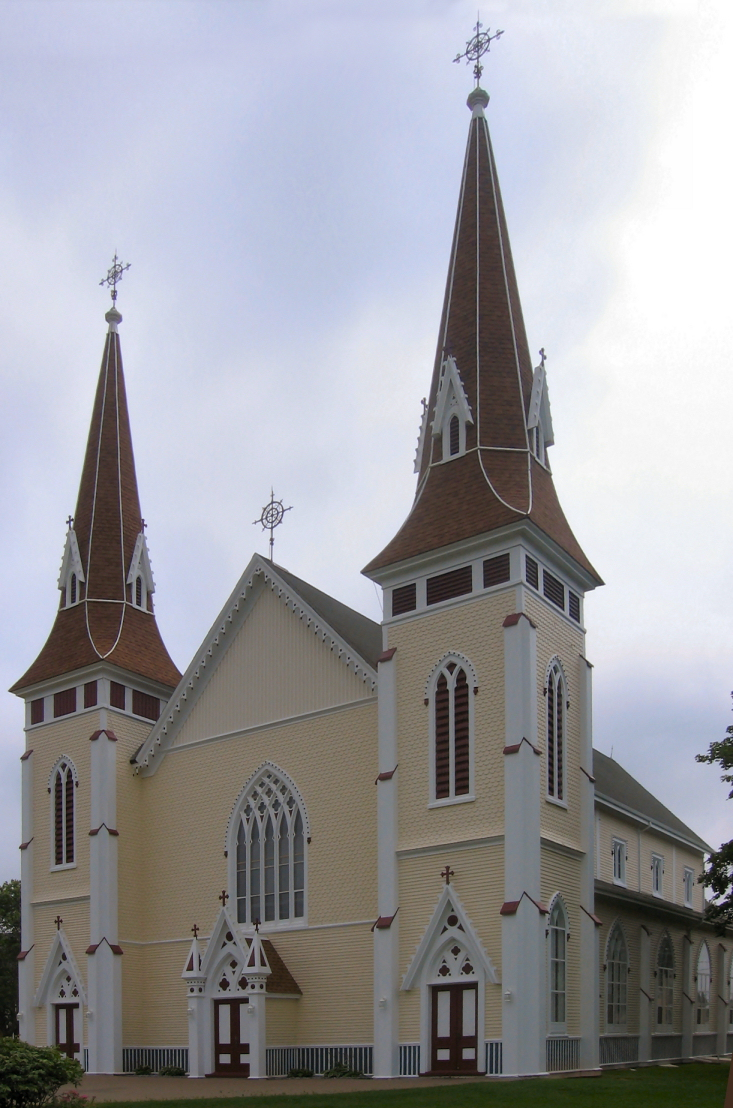
Saint-Jean-Baptiste Church in Miscouche.

Most Acadians adhere to Catholicism. The interpretation of Christianity in Acadia incorporates beliefs in the supernatural, particularly spirits and witchcraft, although these practices are on the decline. The Archdiocese of St. John encompasses the entirety of Newfoundland and Labrador, the Archdiocese of Moncton includes the entirety of New Brunswick, and the Archdiocese of Halifax encompasses both Nova Scotia and Prince Edward Island.

The Acadians were originally inclined to tolerate other religions and denominations because some founders were Protestant. The clergy was not particularly prominent and was primarily engaged in evangelizing the Mi'kmaq. Consequently, religious practice was largely a private matter within families due to the dearth of priests. The Acadians were able to retain their religious freedom following the signing of the Treaty of Utrecht in 1713. Following the deportation of the Acadians, relations between the population and the clergy, who were now predominantly Scottish, Irish, or English-speaking, became increasingly strained. Acadian priests received their training at Saint Joseph's College from 1865 onwards; however, they were primarily deployed to English-speaking regions. In the 1880s, a debate commenced regarding the Acadianization of the clergy. This resulted in the appointment of the inaugural bishop, Alfred-Édouard Leblanc, in 1913. A movement was subsequently initiated to petition the Pope for enhanced representation within the clergy, despite opposition from English-speaking parties. This resulted in a favorable outcome. The proposal to establish an archdiocese in Moncton, however, encountered even greater resistance, yet it was ultimately approved in 1936. In 1944, the Diocese of Edmundston was detached, and in 1953, the Diocese of Yarmouth was separated from Halifax. The Catholic faith remained an integral aspect of Acadian identity until the 1940s when most of the elite were either members of the clergy or had received their education in Catholic colleges. Religious communities played a foundational role in the education and health sectors until the 1970s. As in many regions of the world, religious practice subsequently declined as the number of priests decreased, resulting in the closure of some parishes. The Catholic faith remains a significant aspect of the lives of a considerable proportion of the population, yet its association with the Acadian identity is anticipated to evolve in the future, as postulated by historian Naomi Griffiths.

The interpretation of Catholicism in Acadia places significant importance on women, as evidenced by the large number of churches dedicated to a saint, cathedrals dedicated to Mary or Saint Anne, and the fact that two female religious communities were founded in Acadia: the Congregation of the Daughters of Mary of the Assumption and the Congregation of the Sisters of Our Lady of the Sacred Heart. In contrast, the male communities originate from Quebec or France. The cult of Saint Anne is of great significance, and the designation of Mary of the Assumption as the patron saint did not alter this. The sea also occupies a prominent role in religious practice, as evidenced by the continued popularity of Fishermen's Sunday and the blessing of boats.

== Languages ==
There are numerous Acadian dialects. Acadian French represents the primary dialect of French spoken throughout Acadia, except for Madawaska, where the Valley French, also known as Brayon, exhibits a significant degree of influence from Quebec French. Moreover, Acadians in Quebec predominantly use Quebec French, although Acadian French is prevalent in select regions, such as the Magdalen Islands. Chiac, also spoken in the Moncton area, is occasionally classified as a dialect of French significantly influenced by English, and at other times, as a distinct language. Populations that have undergone Anglicization typically employ American English or maritime English.

While there is no standardization body in Acadia, the Office québécois de la langue française undoubtedly exerts considerable influence, particularly concerning technical language. Some provincial organizations play a limited role, for example, in toponymy. Many scholars have undertaken studies of Acadian French. Pascal Poirier published Le glossaire acadien in 1925, with a second edition in 1993. Yves Cormier presented Dictionnaire du français acadien in 2009. These dictionaries concentrate exclusively on Acadianisms. Major French dictionaries include a few entries, but there are numerous notable omissions, including words without equivalents in the Francophonie, as well as some errors.

== Education ==
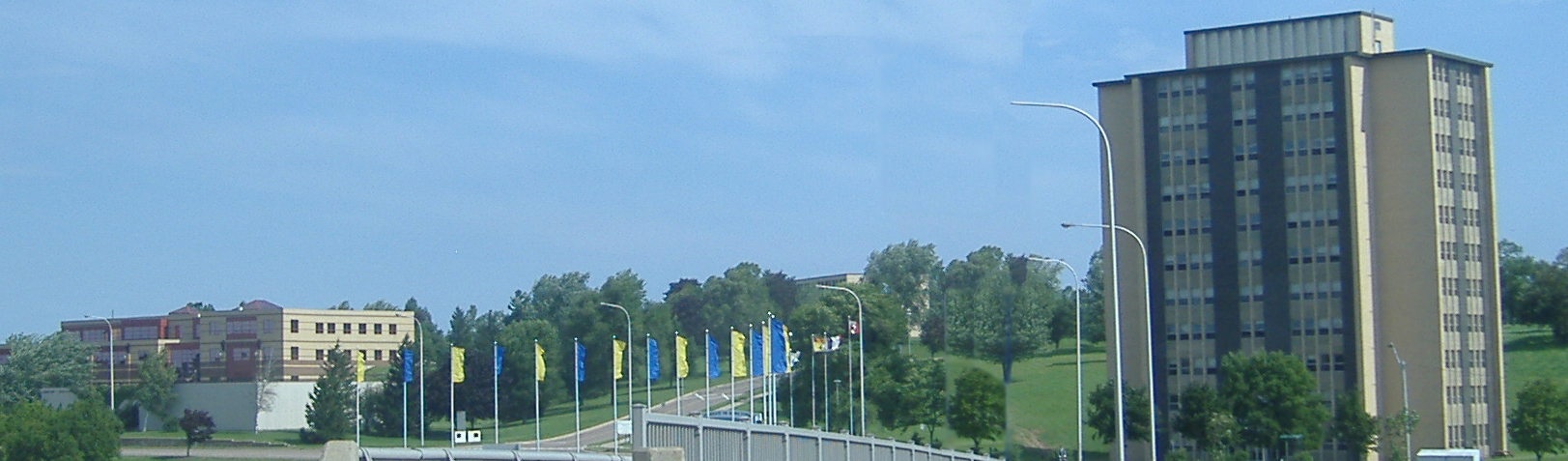
Université de Moncton.

Canada has the largest proportion of individuals aged 18 to 35 who have obtained a post-secondary diploma. Additionally, the Atlantic provinces have the largest per capita budgets for education among G8 countries. However, the situation is markedly distinct for Acadians. In Prince Edward Island, the population remains poorly educated, with 34% lacking a high school diploma. However, the rate of college graduates (21.5%) is at the Canadian average, while the rate of university graduates (13%) is close to the provincial average. In New Brunswick, 37% of Acadians lack a high school diploma, compared to the provincial average of 29%. The rate of university graduates in Moncton is comparable to that in Montreal (20.4%). This situation is attributed to the natural resource-based economy of most regions. In Nova Scotia, Acadians are becoming increasingly educated (70% graduates), surpassing the average of Canadian francophones, but still below the provincial level (73% graduates). This situation is also linked to the economic situation. Francophones in Newfoundland, of all origins, are slightly more educated than the Anglophone majority, and 21% are university graduates, compared to 11% among Anglophones and 16% among Canadian francophones.

The New Brunswick Ministry of Education is responsible for the allocation of funding and the establishment of standards, while the management of schools and the curriculum are the purview of two distinct sectors. The Francophone sector encompasses 98 schools, which are grouped into five distinct school districts, and 2,434 teachers. The number of students enrolled in these schools is 32,353. The province of Nova Scotia has a Provincial Acadian School Board within its ministry. This Board oversees 20 unilingual French schools, which collectively serve 4,000 students and 600 employees. The French Language School Board of Prince Edward Island is responsible for the province's six Francophone schools. The Provincial Francophone School Board of Newfoundland and Labrador oversees five schools.

The New Brunswick Community College has a Francophone sector comprising five institutions. The Collège Acadie of Prince Edward Island has three campuses.

Université Sainte-Anne has five campuses in Nova Scotia, with the main one in Pointe-de-l'Église and others in Tusket, Halifax, Petit-de-Grat, and Saint-Joseph-du-Moine. The institution comprises the Faculty of Arts and Sciences, which offers bachelor's degrees and a master's degree in education, the Faculty of Professional Programs, and the School of Immersion. Additionally, there are five chairs and research centers.

Additionally Université de Moncton has a campus in Edmundston, thereby extending its reach to serve students in Maine and Quebec, as well as a campus in Shippagan. The university comprises nine faculties, including a law faculty, and offers 180 programs at various academic levels, from undergraduate to graduate. Additionally, it has 37 centers, chairs, and institutes. The New Brunswick Medical Training Center offers a comprehensive medical program in collaboration with Université de Sherbrooke. In 2009, the university had 6,219 students and 826 employees, including 390 professors, with an annual budget of $103 million.

In the contemporary era, educational institutions espouse a more liberal and less prejudiced approach to knowledge acquisition and dissemination.

== Arts ==
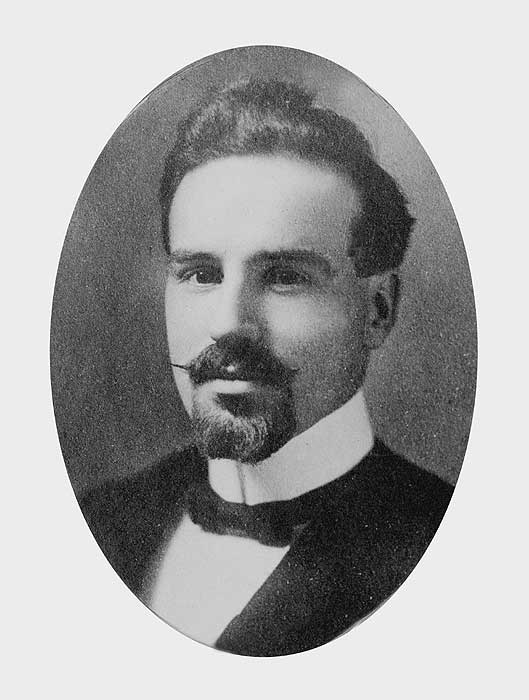
The students of Quebec-born Paul Carmel Laporte have had a major impact on Acadian culture.

Acadians frequently adhere to artistic movements prevalent in Quebec, yet they also exhibit distinctive tendencies. Their relationship with France has fostered an environment where artists are duly acknowledged.

=== Painting and sculpture ===
Until the early twentieth century, most sculptures and paintings were produced by church decorators. Notable among the extant works are those by Philomène Belliveau, Caroline Léger, Anna Bourque-Bourgeois, Jeanne Léger, Alma Buote, and Yolande Boudreau, all of whom pursued their studies in the field of art abroad. From the 1930s onwards, Dr. Paul Carmel Laporte taught sculpture and drawing in Edmundston, training several renowned artists, including Claude Picard, Claude Roussel, and Marie Hélène Allain. A considerable number of artists from the same period were compelled to pursue their studies abroad before resuming their careers in Acadia. This includes notable figures such as Gertrude Godbout, Eulalie Boudreau, René Hébert, Georges Goguen, Roméo Savoie, Hilda Lavoie-Franchon, and Claude Gauvin. Some of these artists created religious paintings and murals for churches, including Édouard Gautreau, Claude Picard, and Ernest Cormier. The Sainte-Anne-de-Kent church, which included paintings by Gautreau, was colloquially designated the "Sistine Chapel of Acadia" until it was destroyed by a fire in 2007. Nelson Surette is renowned for his paintings that depict scenes of everyday life. Additionally, Adrien Arsenault is a noteworthy figure in this context. Nérée De Grâce draws inspiration from Acadian folklore, and his paintings are found in numerous collections across the globe, including on a Canadian postage stamp. Canadian museums possess works by other artists, most notably sculptors Arthur Gallant, Alfred Morneault, and Octave Verret, as well as painters Léo B. LeBlanc, Médard Cormier, and Camille Cormier. (Note: Doucette, Leonard E; et al. (2006). Culture de l'Acadie (in French). The Canadian Encyclopedia. Archived from the original on July 1, 2024.; section: Peinture et sculpture)

In 1963 Claude Roussel established the visual arts department at the Université de Moncton. Notable alumni include the multidisciplinary artist Herménégilde Chiasson and painter Yvon Gallant. Other notable graduates include Paul Édouard Bourque, Jacques Arseneault, Francis Coutellier, Marc Cyr, Pierre Noël LeBlanc, and Anne-Marie Sirois, as well as Lucille. Notable graduates of the visual arts department at Université de Moncton include Lionel Robichaud, Cormier, Luc A. Charette, Daniel Dugas, Guy Duguay, Roger Vautour, Ghislaine McLaughlin, Gilles LeBlanc, Georges Blanchette, Gilles Arsenault, Hélène LaRoche, and André Lapointe. Robert Saucier, Jocelyn Jean, and Paul-Émile Saulnier are also prominent artists who work in Quebec but have a significant international clientele.

=== Music ===
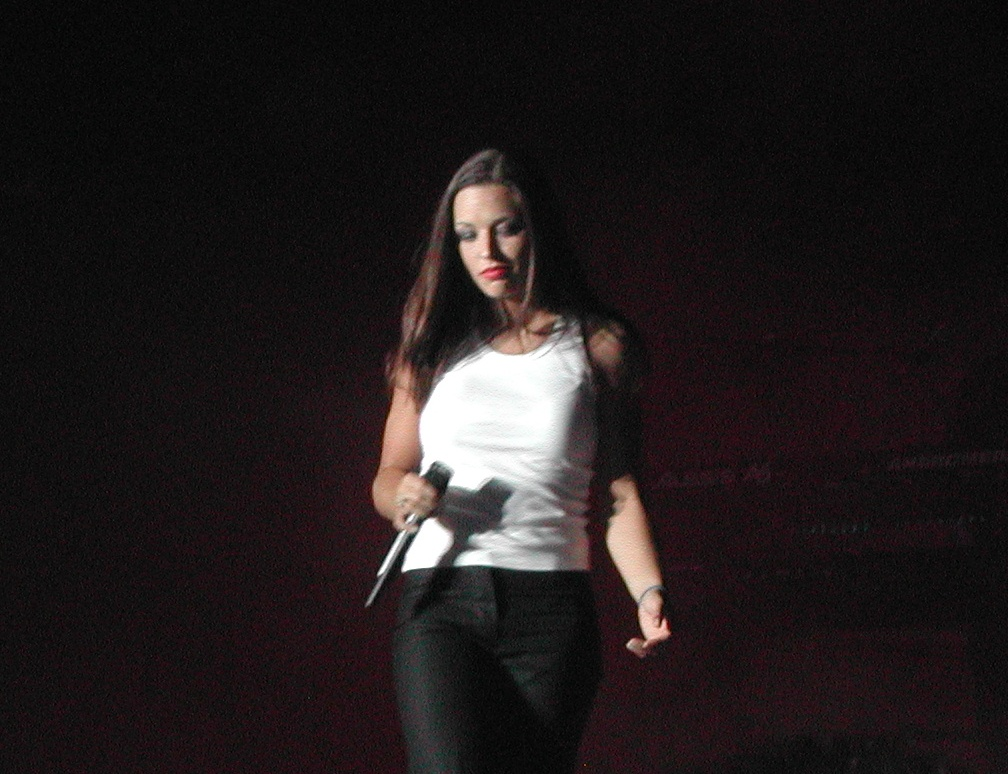
Natasha St-Pier

In the nineteenth century, religious communities played an instrumental role in the evolution of Acadian music, while college bands and parish choirs rapidly gained prominence. (Note: Doucette et al. 2006, section: Musique) Several musicians, including Arthur LeBlanc and Anna Malenfant, gained international recognition during the 20th century. From the 1960s onwards, musicians were inspired by folklore, including Angèle Arsenault, Édith Butler, Calixte Duguay, Donat Lacroix, and the bands 1755 and Beausoleil Broussard. (Note: Doucette et al. 2006, section: Folklore) Meanwhile, Patsy Gallant enjoyed considerable popularity in Canada, performing a diverse range of musical styles. The musical landscape subsequently diversified into a multitude of genres, including country (Cayouche, Amélie Hall), pop (Danny Boudreau, Jean-François Breau, Wilfred LeBouthillier, Natasha St-Pier, Roch Voisine, Marie-Jo Thério), hip-hop (Radio Radio), and jazz (Les Païens). Additionally, rock music saw the emergence of notable artists such as Lisa LeBlanc, Zéro Degrés Celsius, Christian Kit Goguen, and Trans Akadi, while folk music retained its popularity with acts like Barachois, Grand Dérangement, La Virée, and Ode à l'Acadie. At the turn of the 21st century, the most popular genres were folk and country. The Gala de la chanson de Caraquet, the Festival Acadien de Caraquet, and Moncton Rock are among the primary music events. An Acadian invention is the tritare.

=== Literature ===
Marc Lescarbot is regarded as the founder of Acadian literature and theater in Port-Royal in 1606, with the publication of his work, Le Théâtre de Neptune. (Note: Doucette et al. 2006, section: Littérature) (Note: Doucette et al. 2006, section: Théâtre) Subsequently, many visitors and clergymen produced written works on a variety of subjects, including geography, religious practices, and economic conditions. The paucity of texts produced by Acadians during this period can be attributed to the prevailing political unrest and the gradual demographic expansion. Following the deportation, a period elapsed before literature reappeared; however, the oral tradition continued to flourish. With the establishment of educational institutions, namely schools and colleges, during the nineteenth century, and subsequently the advent of the Acadian National Conventions, Acadians and their clergy commenced the process of re-discovering their identity and aspirations within the context of an Anglophone world. Until the 1960s, literature was dominated by the nationalist debate. The rediscovery of Acadian history gave rise to a significant corpus of texts, particularly those of Pascal Poirier. In the 20th century, the importance of nationalism declined, and numerous authors, including Antonine Maillet, shifted their attention to other subjects. During the 1960s, several authors from the diaspora published their works, including Donat Coste and Rénald Després. From 1966 onwards, younger authors began to challenge traditional values. This movement was further accelerated by the Quiet Revolution in Quebec, the reforms of Louis Robichaud in New Brunswick, student strikes, and the phenomenal success of La Sagouine by Antonine Maillet. The poetry genre was the first to reflect this shift in literary trends. While Antonine Maillet's novel was a dominant force, numerous other authors also made noteworthy contributions. Since the mid-1980s, Acadian literature has flourished, as evidenced by the proliferation of publishing houses and its growing recognition in the American and European contexts. The works encompass a diverse range of genres, with a notable emergence of children's literature.

==== Theater ====
The inaugural Acadian play, and arguably the inaugural theatrical production in North America, Le Théâtre de Neptune, was devised by Marc Lescarbot in 1606. For two centuries, the socio-economic and political context was such that theatre was no longer a viable pursuit. Nevertheless, the oral tradition flourished and continues to exert an influence to the present day. From 1864 onwards, colleges, notably the Collège Saint-Joseph de Memramcook, began to demonstrate an interest in theatre. Professors such as Alexandre Braud and Jean-Baptiste Jégo were responsible for the creation of highly popular plays. Nationalists such as Pascal Poirier and James Branch were responsible for the production of parish plays. The first independent troupe, the Troupe Notre-Dame de Grâce de Moncton, was established by Laurie Henri in 1956.

The production of Les Crasseux by Antonine Maillet in 1968 is regarded as the inaugural work of Acadian theatre. In the same year, two additional troupes were established: Les Feux Chaldins and the Théâtre Amateur de Moncton. Furthermore, a drama program was initiated at the Université de Moncton in 1969. Launched in 1971, La Sagouine by Antonine Maillet attained remarkable acclaim following its presentation at the Théâtre du Rideau Vert in Montreal in 1972. Subsequent performances have exceeded 2,000, with Viola Léger as the sole performer.

The Popular Theatre of Acadia, the inaugural professional theatrical ensemble in the region, was established in 1974 in Caraquet. The company's repertoire included notable works such as Louis Mailloux by Jules Boudreau and Calixte Duguay, as well as Le Djibou by Laval Goupil. The Théâtre l'Escaouette was established in 1977 in Moncton and has consistently prioritized the works of Herménégilde Chiasson. Maillet has continued her career in both theatre and literature. Theatre produced by Acadians has diversified in terms of both genre and theme. The TPA has concentrated on developing a repertoire, whereas Théâtre l'Escaouette has placed greater emphasis on original creation. While there has been an improvement in dramaturgical quality, the lack of Acadian texts represents a significant challenge.

The challenging economic climate of the 1980s compelled theatrical ensembles to cancel scheduled productions, ultimately leading to the cessation of activities by the Compagnie Viola-Léger in 1989. In response to the prevailing circumstances, troupes have sought to diversify their output by directing their attention towards children's productions, where the works of Herménégilde Chiasson have proven particularly well-suited. The Pays de la Sagouine was established in 1992 in Bouctouche, its foundation is based on the work of Antonine Maillet. An increasing number of plays are being published. Theatre reverted to a more adult orientation in the mid-1990s and experienced a revival with the founding of new troupes, such as Moncton Sable in 1996, and the arrival of new playwrights, including Gracia Couturier. However, the prominence of Quebec productions attracts criticism. Some new critical and financial successes, including the revival of the play Louis Mailloux, as well as the founding of festivals, nevertheless highlight typically Acadian creations.

=== Cinema ===
Léonard Forest, a pioneering figure in Acadian cinema during the 1950s, (Note: Doucette et al. 2006, section: Cinéma) played a pivotal role in establishing the Moncton studio of the National Film Board of Canada, which served as the primary venue for the production of Acadian films. The films Éloge du chiac by Michel Brault and Acadia, Acadia (L'Acadie, L'Acadie?!?) by Brault, and Pierre Perrault are regarded as the inaugural works of Acadian expression, having been released in 1969. The majority of Acadian films are documentaries or short or medium-length films. However, there are a few feature films, including Le Secret de Jérôme and Lost Song, while some directors have ventured into fiction and animation. Notable filmmakers include Bettie Arsenault, Robert Awad, Renée Blanchar, Rodolphe Caron, Herménégilde Chiasson, Phil Comeau, Claudette Lajoie, Christien Leblanc, Monique Leblanc, Ginette Pellerin, Jacques Savoie, and Anne-Marie Sirois. Notable actors and directors have pursued careers in Hollywood, including the De Grasse brothers (Joseph and Sam) in the early 20th century and Robert Maillet in the 21st century. The principal annual event is the Festival international du cinéma francophone en Acadie, held in Moncton.

==== Comic strips and television ====
Acadieman is believed to be the inaugural Acadian comic strip, created by Dano LeBlanc in the early 2000s. Adapted into an animated series in 2005, the character's success led to the production of the feature film Acadieman vs. le C.M.A. in 2009. Another noteworthy television series is Belle-Baie, which has been broadcast since 2008.

== Architecture ==
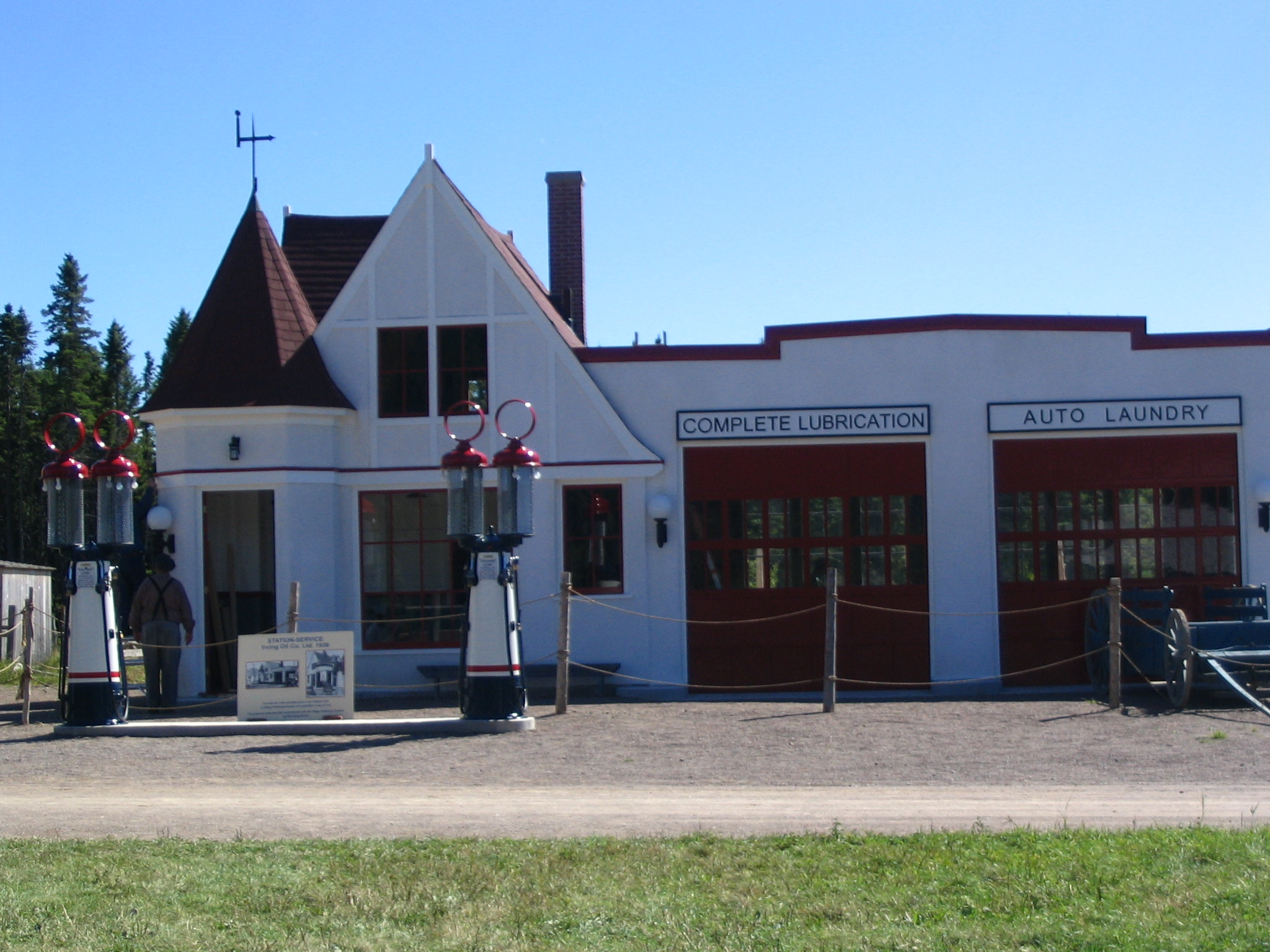
Service station designed by Samuel Roy.

The architectural traditions of the Acadians have their roots in France but have undergone rapid adaptation to the climatic conditions and local materials. This has involved adopting construction techniques used by the Mi'kmaq and Maliseet, to improve the insulation of houses. In the aftermath of the deportation of the Acadians, the remaining houses were of poor quality and hastily constructed. Despite the improvement in living conditions, the architectural style remained relatively simple until the mid-19th century. Gradually, traces of French inspiration gave way to American and English influences. The first Acadian architects began their careers towards the end of the century. Léon Léger is recognized for his convent of the Immaculate Conception in Bouctouche, and Nazaire Dugasf designed the Château Albert. Materials like brick gradually made their appearance. It is challenging to define a typical Acadian style, as no comprehensive study has been conducted on the subject. Since the 1970s, several historic villages have been constructed, and many new buildings have been designed in a manner that harmonizes with traditional architecture.

== Publishing and communications ==
The telecommunications network in Acadie is one of the most advanced in the world. The telecommunications network in Acadie is entirely digital, encompassing both high-speed internet and cellular telephony. In 2009, between 69% and 77% of the population in the Atlantic provinces used the Internet for personal purposes, a figure that falls slightly below the Canadian average of 80%. The network is primarily managed by Bell Aliant, Rogers Communications, and EastLink.

== Media ==
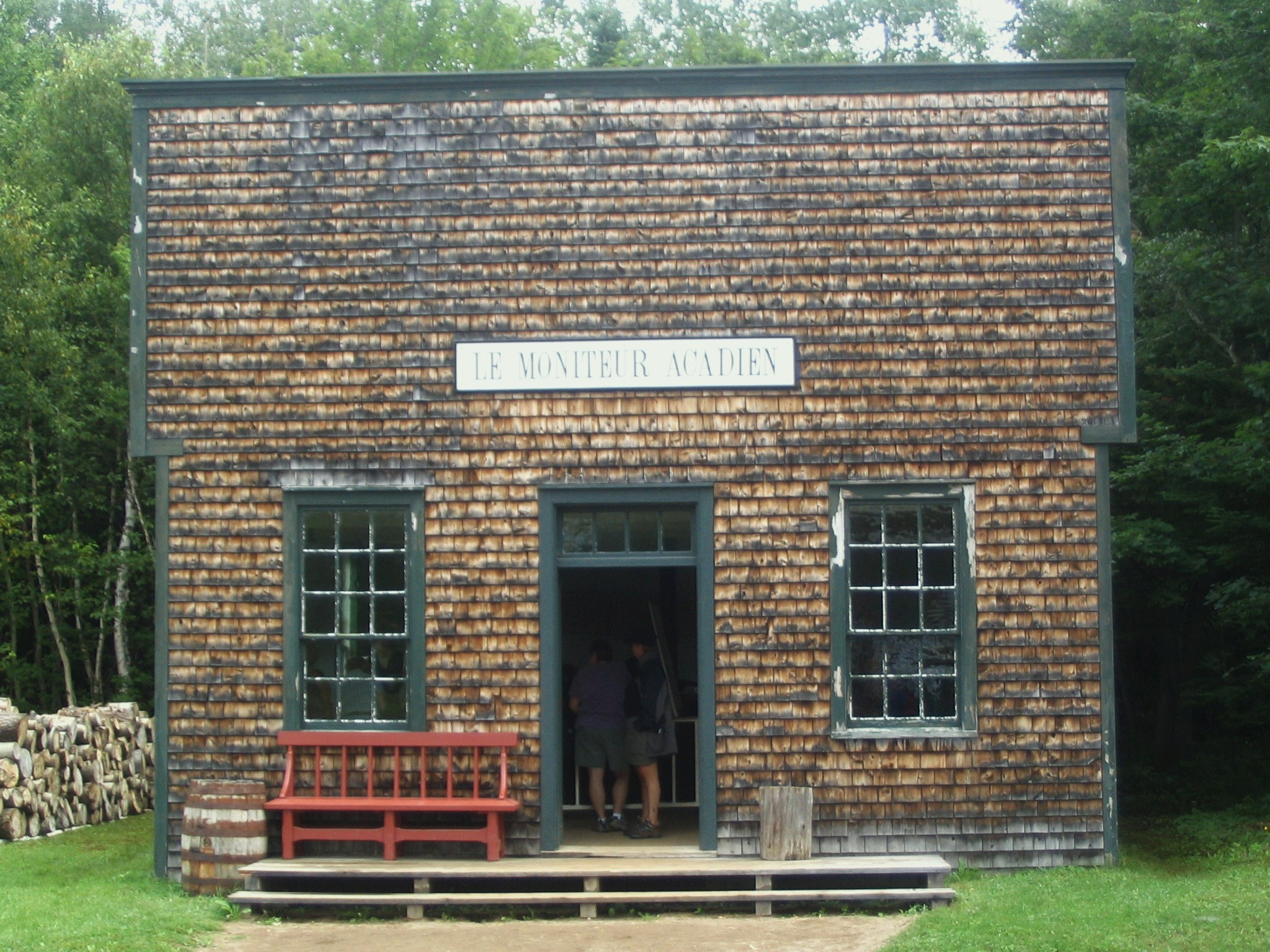
The original Moniteur Acadien building.

Acadie is served by numerous North American media outlets, the majority of which are English-speaking. The main outlet is the Société Radio-Canada. Indeed, Radio-Canada Acadie maintains a newsroom in Moncton, in addition to regional offices in eleven other cities. New Brunswick continues to have a French-language daily newspaper, L'Acadie Nouvelle. Additionally, there are weekly publications, including L'Étoile, Le Moniteur Acadien, Le Courrier de la Nouvelle-Écosse, and La Voix Acadienne, as well as monthly and other periodicals, such as Le Gaboteur. Radio has a long-standing presence, while the internet is undergoing rapid development. The portals jminforme.ca and CapAcadie.com collate headlines from the majority of media outlets. Furthermore, CapAcadie.com provides webradios and internet television, CapTV, which broadcasts several original productions.

The media, particularly the press, have played an important role in developing Acadian culture and politics since the mid-19th century. However, the development of the media has been gradual due to various factors, including geographical distribution, minority status, economic dynamism, education level, and transportation. The oldest newspaper is Le Moniteur Acadien, which was founded in 1867. Among the defunct newspapers, L'Évangéline was the most influential.

== Cuisine ==
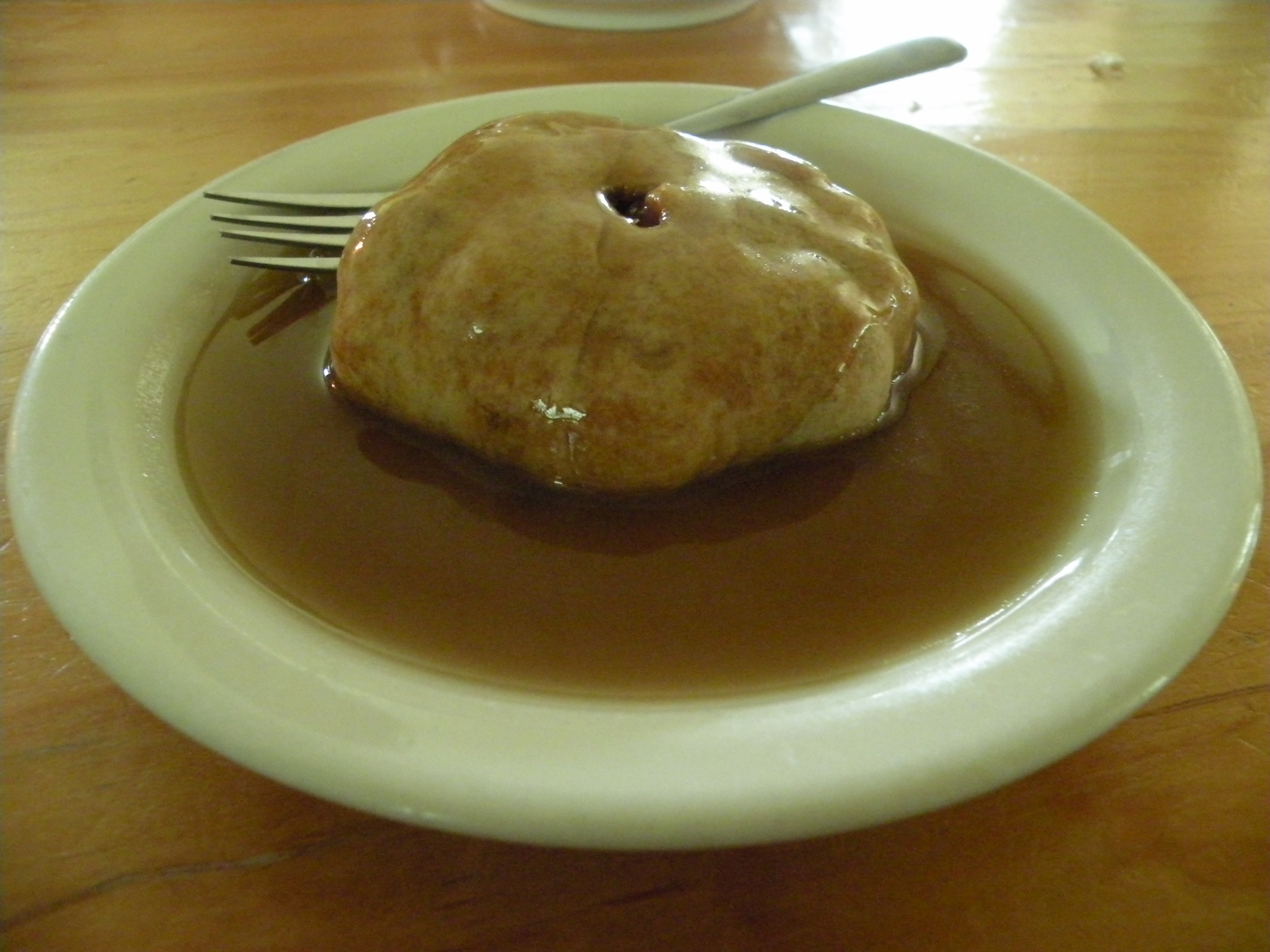
A poutine à trou.

Acadian cuisine is of French origin, but it has been influenced by several other cultures, particularly French Canadian, Amerindian, and even German. There are several regional variations within the cuisine. The majority of ingredients are locally available, while some are imported from the West Indies and Brazil, including raisins, rice, brown sugar, and molasses. The potato is the staple food, and fish and seafood are highly consumed.

== Traditions ==
=== Craftsmanship ===
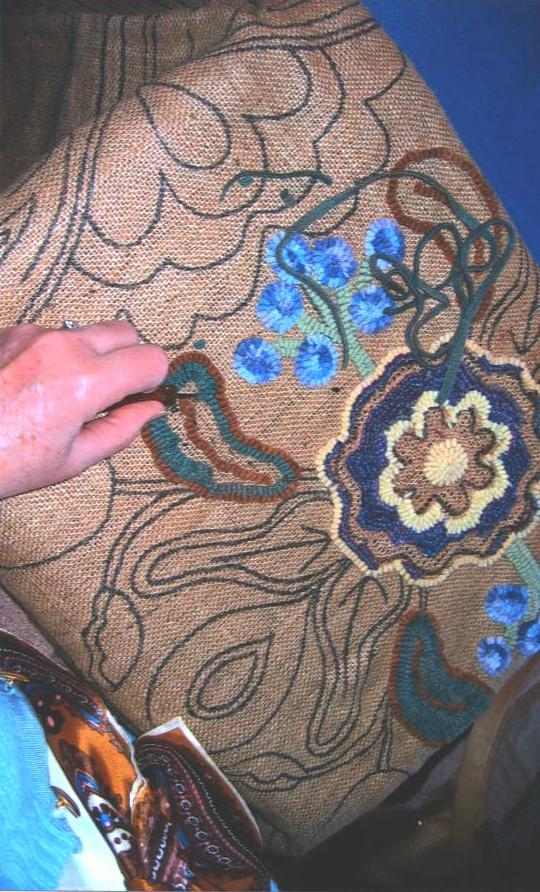
Making a houqué rug.

The Acadian craft tradition is largely rooted in traditional techniques and methods. The quilt is a highly popular craft, and although Evelyn Coutellier has developed original patterns, the majority of artisans adhere to traditional patterns, only modifying the colors. Chéticamp is renowned for its hooked rugs, which are typically produced in series. However, there are notable exceptions, such as Elizabeth Lefort, who is celebrated for her intricate murals. The Tisserands du Madawaska, a designation that refers to the region in question, are engaged in the production of clothing and placemats. The majority of Acadian regions within this province are home to artisans engaged in various forms of craftsmanship, including weaving, wood carving, and other techniques. Additionally, they are present in Baie-Sainte-Marie. Adrienne Landry of Dieppe was previously the sole experienced weaver in southeastern New Brunswick. Subsequently, the artisans of St. Louis have adopted weaving as their craft, with training provided by the Regional Development agency. The St. Paul Craft Cooperative has expanded its scope to encompass symmography (string-based craft), and their plaques representing La Sagouine have achieved considerable popularity. Several pottery workshops have been established by graduates in ceramics, including Les Métiers d'art du Nord-Est by the Frachons, the Keramos studio in Cocagne by Ronald Gauguen, Fernand Daigle in Saint-Louis-de-Kent, and Nancy Morin in Moncton.

=== Costume ===
Nowadays, Acadians adhere to a style of dress that is analogous to that of Western populations. However, the traditional costume is reserved for ceremonial occasions. It encompasses a white bonnet, a white blouse, a black skirt, and a white apron for women, while men wear a white shirt, a black jacket, and black ankle-length trousers. Both men and women wear white stockings and black shoes.

=== Folklore ===
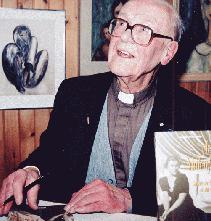
Anselme Chiasson.

The isolation of Acadia until the end of the nineteenth century permitted the preservation of a diverse folklore tradition, which was transmitted from one generation to the next. The existence of songs from the early 20th century provides evidence of a cultural awakening. The elite held a disdain for folklore until the newspaper L'Évangéline began publishing a column by Thomas Leblanc on Acadian songs in 1939. Additionally, Anselme Chiasson and Daniel Boudreau published the collection Chansons d'Acadie between 1942 and 1956. Subsequently, foreign researchers became interested in Acadian folklore, which the Acadians themselves subsequently imitated. The Université de Moncton has been teaching folklore since 1966, and its Centre d'études acadiennes Anselme-Chiasson has an important collection on the subject, which is in addition to that of Laval University. Furthermore, folklore has inspired numerous authors, including Antonine Maillet.

=== Traditional medicine ===
Acadians preserve several traditional remedies.

== Society ==
=== Family life ===
In traditional agricultural communities, men typically engage in seasonal labor outside the home, while women assume primary responsibility for domestic and agricultural tasks within the household. Children tend to attend school from the age of three to six, after which they contribute to agricultural labor before entering marriageable age. Girls typically receive more education than boys, and only a minority of children pursue higher education. In contemporary times, women have largely assumed paid employment, and the traditional division of labor has gradually eroded since the 1970s.

The concept of land ownership is pervasive, extending even to urban areas. Nevertheless, it is notable that some individuals do lease Crown land, particularly for logging. Previously, elderly parents would reside with one of their children; however, it is increasingly common for them to be sent to a retirement home. Moreover, the tradition of married couples residing with the groom's parents until they have accumulated sufficient capital to construct a residence is becoming less prevalent. Historically, inheritance was distributed among sons, but currently, real estate is typically allocated to the eldest son, with other assets divided among the children. During the nineteenth century, English practices regarding the inheritance of non-land assets were adopted.

The attachment to family, including distant kinship, is strong, seemingly due to the necessity of maintaining ties in a minority environment. The family structure is generally nuclear, with bilateral descent being recognized, and the terms "paternal" and "maternal" being used to qualify relatives. Additionally, cousins up to the third degree are recognized.

The birth rate declined markedly after the 1960s, reaching one of the lowest levels in Canada. The average age of marriage has also increased from the early twenties, with women often marrying much younger, to the mid-twenties. Divorce, which was strongly condemned by the Church, has nevertheless become common. Interethnic marriages were once considered taboo, and although social pressure has decreased, they remain rare. Sexuality outside of reproduction was suppressed until the 1960s.

=== Genealogy ===
The practice of genealogy is regarded as a significant aspect of Acadian culture, with the responsibility of maintaining lineage typically entrusted to the eldest family member. However, with the advent of archival centers, the preservation of records has become a more formalized process. The Acadian population is relatively small, with some villages comprising a single extended family. This has led to the common practice of referring to individuals by their father's name, rather than their surname, to distinguish them from other community members. For instance, the name "Patrick" may be rendered as "Théodore" to differentiate him from another individual named Patrick Dugas.

=== Social life ===
The values of hard work, respect for authority, and religious observance are highly esteemed. Some rural communities adhere to an unwritten code of conduct that formerly resulted in rare instances of corporal punishment or permanent or temporary exclusion in cases of non-compliance. Nevertheless, recourse to the police and the justice system has become prevalent in the wake of Acadia's modernization.

=== Etiquette ===
Good manners are considered important in this culture, including opening doors for women and offering them seats, kissing between men and women, and hugging among close women. It is customary to keep one's hands on the table, resting on the wrist for women and the arm for men; elbows may only be placed on the table after the meal. Eating on the street is considered ill-mannered. The gesture of giving a thumbs-down sign (👎) is considered offensive.

== Sport ==
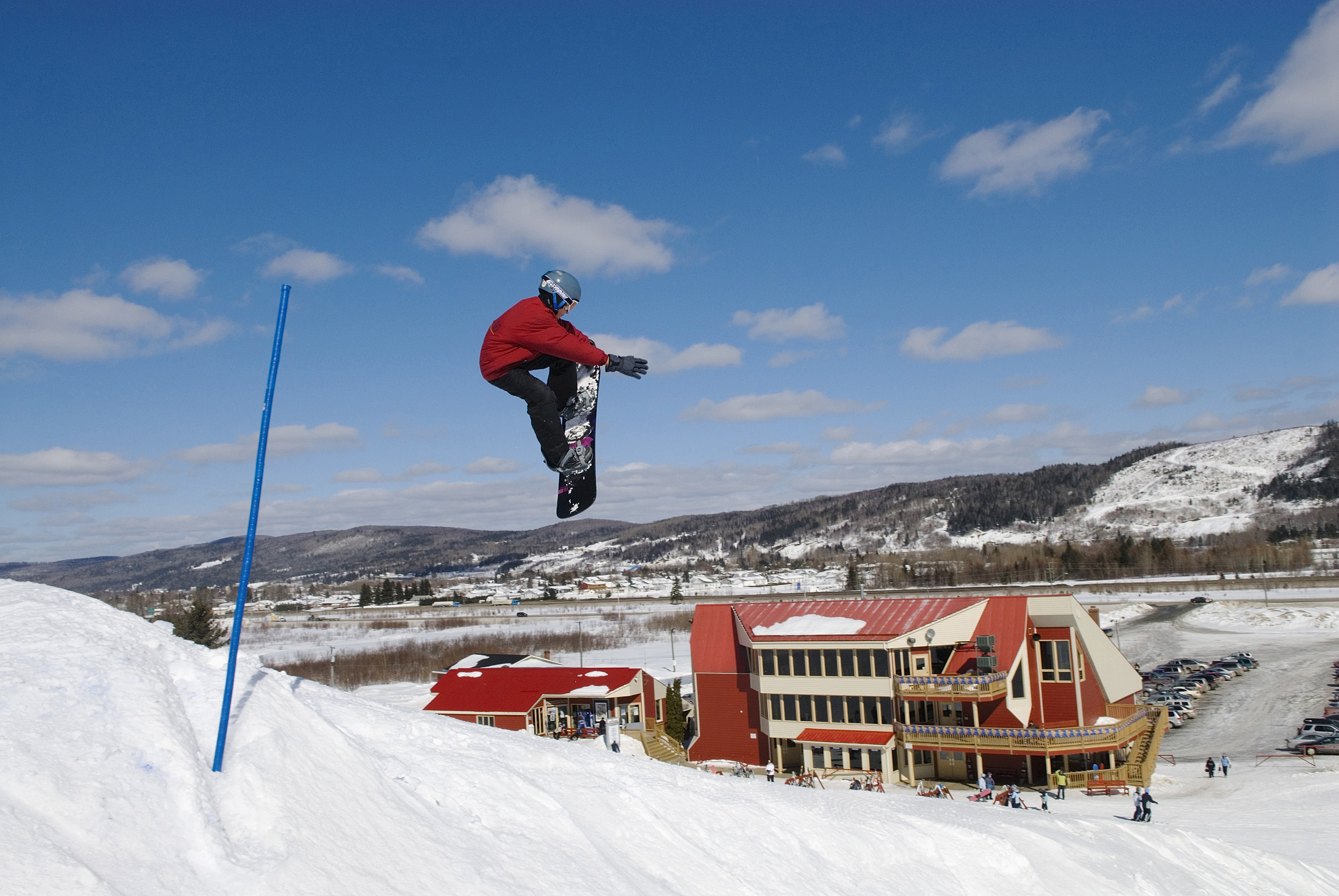
Snowboarding at Mont Farlagne.

Many Acadians have achieved prominence in professional sports, including Yvon Durelle in boxing, Rhéal Cormier in baseball, Ron Turcotte in horse racing, and Luc Bourdon and Roland Melanson in ice hockey. Additionally, several professional teams are based in Acadian regions, with representation from the Quebec Major Junior Hockey League.

Sports have been a part of Acadia since its inception, yet their presence in the culture was initially limited due to the challenging living conditions that prevailed at the time. The establishment of colleges towards the end of the 19th century played a pivotal role in the integration of sports into the fabric of daily life. In the 1960s, the construction of new educational facilities included the incorporation of gyms and other sports amenities. The establishment of a French-language normal school in Moncton, followed by the opening of the Department of Physical Education at the Université de Moncton, facilitated the training of teachers in French. Since 1979, the Acadian Games have provided an opportunity for aspiring athletes from across Acadia to compete against one another.

== See also ==
- Acadia
- Acadians
- Culture of Canada

== Bibliography ==
- Cormier, Yves (1999). Dictionnaire du français acadien (in French). Montreal: Groupe Fides. ISBN 2-7621-2166-3.
- Daigle, Jean (1980). Les Acadiens des Maritimes : études thématiques (in French). Moncton: Centre d'études acadiennes Anselme-Chiasson.
- Daigle, Jean (1993). L'Acadie des Maritimes : études thématiques des débuts à nos jours (in French) (4th ed.). Moncton: Centre d'études acadiennes, Université de Moncton. ISBN 978-2-921166-06-5. Archived from the original on July 25, 2012.
- Dupont, Jean-Claude (1977). Héritage d'Acadie (in French). Montreal: Leméac.
- Dupont, Jean-Claude (1977). Histoire populaire de l'Acadie. Montreal: Leméac. ISBN 2-7609-5278-9.
- Gair, Revley (1986). Langues et littératures au Nouveau-Brunswick (in French). Moncton: Éditions d'Acadie. ISBN 2-7600-0129-6.
- Jolicoeur, Catherine (1980). Les plus belles légendes acadiennes (in French). Montreal: Stanké.
- Labelle, Ronald; Léger, Lauraine (1982). En r'montant la tradition : hommage au père Anselme Chiasson (in French). Moncton: Éditions d'Acadie.
- Landry, Michelle; Pépin-Filion, Dominique; Massicotte, Julien (2021). L'état de l'Acadie (in French). Montreal: De Busso. pp. 230–272. ISBN 9782925079224.
- Maillet, Marguerite; Leblanc, Gérald; Emont, Bernard (1992). Anthologie de textes littéraires acadiens : 1606-1975 (in French). Moncton: Éditions d'Acadie. ISBN 2-7600-0228-4.
- Massignon, Geneviève (1965). Les parlers français d'Acadie : enquête linguistique (in French). Paris: Librairie C. Klincksieck.
