= Émilie Leblanc =

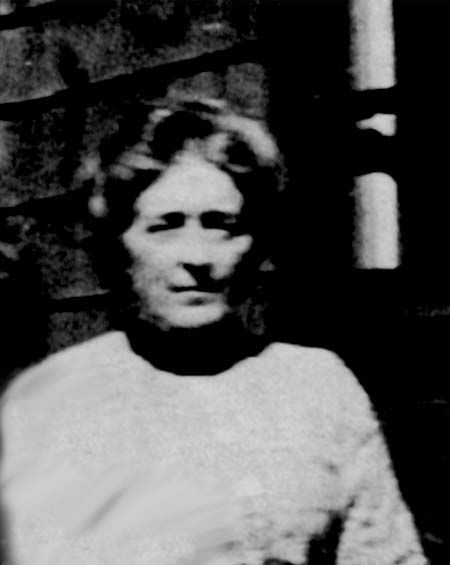
- Born: May 14, 1863; College Bridge, New Brunswick
- Died: December 19, 1935 (aged 72); Moncton, New Brunswick
- Occupation: educator

Émilie Leblanc (May 14, 1863 – December 19, 1935) was a Canadian educator and Acadian activist.

The daughter of Mathilde and Calixte LeBlanc, she was born in College Bridge, New Brunswick. A series of 13 letters written by Leblanc appeared in the Weymouth newspaper L'Évangéline between February 1895 and February 1898 under the pseudonym Marichette. Marichette was supposedly an elderly Acadian woman with many children, unlike Leblanc herself, who was young and had no children. Her first letter spoke in favour of giving women the right to vote. The letters also spoke of the importance of preserving the Acadian culture, language and religion and condemned political corruption and the unfair treatment of the Acadians. The newspaper's owner Valentin Landry eventually bowed to social pressure and stopped publishing Marichette's letters.

Leblanc married Jos Honoré Carrier, an accountant. She taught school in Weymouth for a number of years before returning to New Brunswick.

She died in Moncton and was buried in Memramcook.
