= Le Matin (Acadian) =

Le Matin was a French-language daily newspaper in Moncton, New Brunswick, Canada, founded on 11 August 1986 and disappearing on 29 June 1988.

In the wake of the closure of L'Évangéline in October 1982 two Francophone daily papers were created in New Brunswick - Le Matin at Moncton and l'Acadie Nouvelle at Caraquet. Unlike its counterpart, Le Matin served the whole province. Despite this distribution on the provincial scale and despite subsidies, competition and the narrowness of the market, it did not achieve more than small circulation figures. Minimal advertising receipts brought its collapse barely two years after its launch.

The chief editor and editorial-writer was Rino Morin Rossignol, a writer who had been a cabinet member in the Hatfield government (1970-1987) on the linguistic question of New Brunswick. Gérard Étienne (Haitian poet, writer, linguist and journalist) was another of its editorial writers.

== Sources ==
- This page is a translation of its French counterpart.
