= Fort La Tour =

- Fort Sainte-Marie
- Portland Point, Saint John, New Brunswick, Canada

Site information
- Type: Fortified fur trading post
- Condition: Archaeological site

Location
- Coordinates: 45°16′22″N 66°4′20″W

Site history
- Built: 1631
- Built by: Charles de Saint-Étienne de la Tour
- In use: 1631–1645 (French occupation)
- Materials: Wood
- Battles/wars: Acadian Civil War; Siege of Fort La Tour (1645)
- Events

National Historic Site of Canada
- Official name: Fort La Tour National Historic Site of Canada
- Designated: May 25, 1923

Garrison information
- Past commanders: Charles de Saint-Étienne de la Tour Françoise-Marie Jacquelin (during 1645 siege)
- Occupants: French colonists, Indigenous traders

Fort La Tour (originally Fort Sainte-Marie) was a fortified fur-trading post established in 1631 at Portland Point in present-day Saint John, New Brunswick, Canada, at the mouth of the Saint John River where it empties into the Bay of Fundy. It was built in 1631 by Charles de Saint-Étienne de la Tour, Governor of Acadia.

== History ==
=== Later history ===
In August 1775, during the American Revolutionary War, American rebels from Machias landed on the Carleton (west) side of Saint John Harbour burned an old French barracks at the site known as "Fort Neck".

== Historic designation ==
Fort La Tour was designated a National Historic Site of Canada on May 25, 1923. The site is also designated as a Provincial Historic Site by New Brunswick.

In the 21st century, the site has been developed as "Place Fort La Tour" (also called Menaquesk).
