= L'Évangéline =

Acadian newspaper published from 1887 to 1982

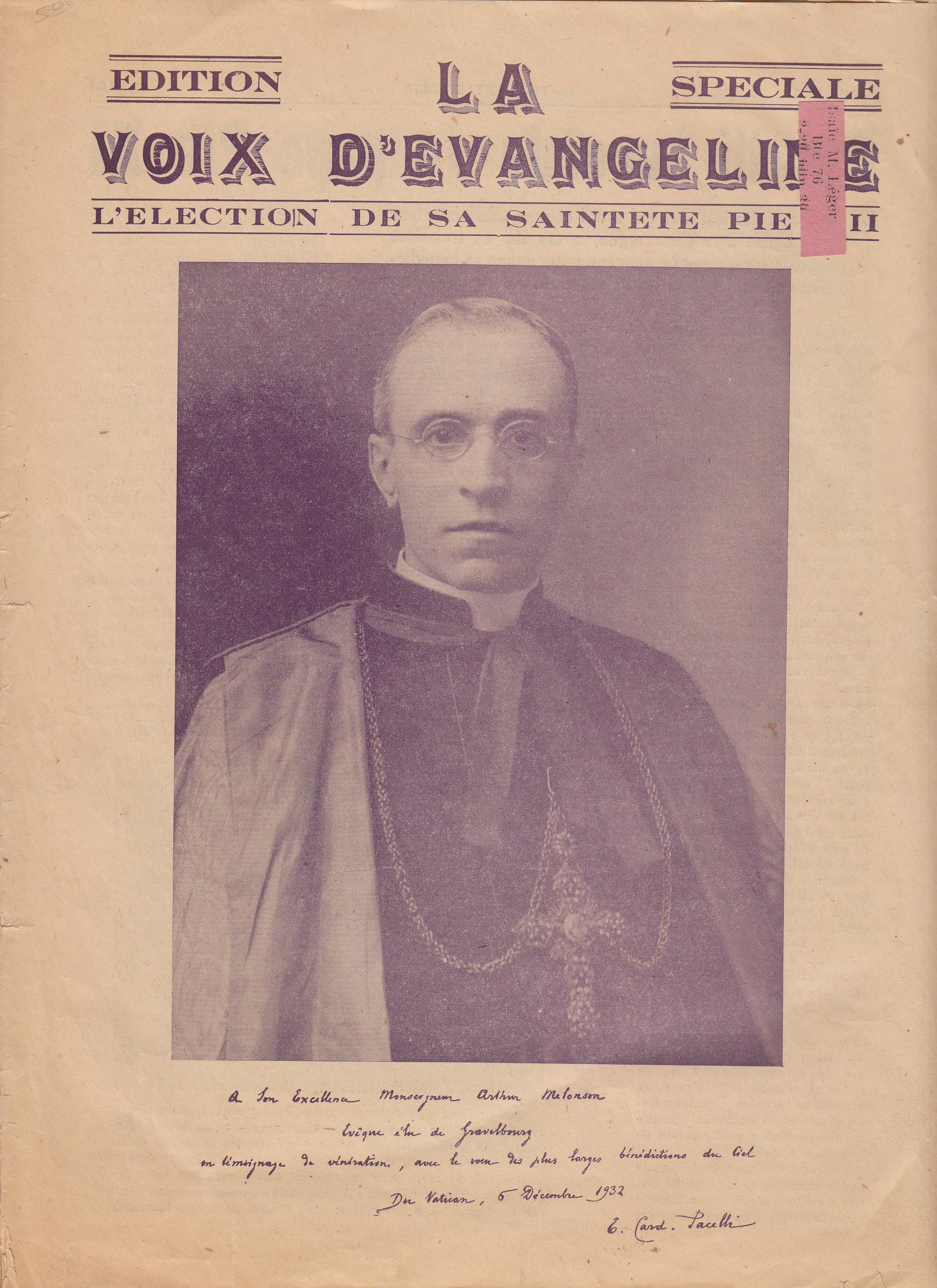
- Cover of the June 1939 special issue on the enthronement of Pope Pius XII.
- Format: Magazine
- Founded: November 23, 1887
- Ceased publication: September 27, 1982
- Language: French
- Headquarters: Digby, Nova Scotia (1887–1889); Weymouth, Nova Scotia (1889–1905); Moncton, New Brunswick (1905–1982)
- Country: Canada
- Circulation: (as of 1980, 21,000)

L'Évangéline was a newspaper founded in 1887 and discontinued in 1982, serving as the primary media outlet for Acadian society for nearly a century, consistently advocating for their causes. Although it was not the oldest of the Acadian newspapers, it remains, despite its closure, the longest-running publication in the history of the Acadian press.

== History ==
=== Reactionary period ===
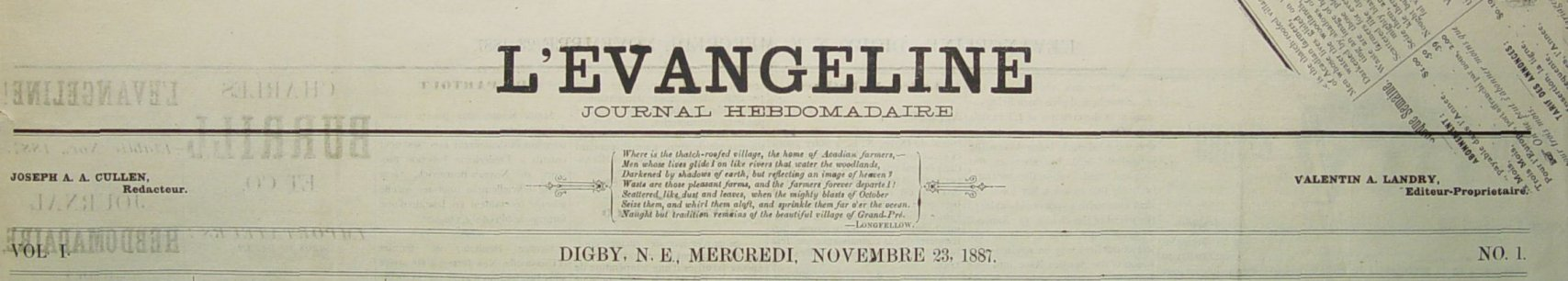
Header of the first issue of L'Évangéline.

The weekly newspaper L'Évangéline was launched on November 23, 1887, in Digby, Nova Scotia, by Valentin Landry, a teacher, school inspector, and journalist born on February 14, 1844, in Pokemouche, New Brunswick.

Two years later, Landry moved his operation to Weymouth, Nova Scotia, where he was better known. There, L'Évangéline was published alongside an English-language newspaper, the Weymouth Free Press, which he also edited until its closure in 1904.

During the third Acadian National Convention, held in Church Point in August 1890, Landry explained his choice of the name of Henry Longfellow's heroine for his newspaper: "A messenger was needed who could frequently reach the heart of Acadian families in Nova Scotia, speak to them in the idiom of our ancestors, and I believed no one would be better received than the poetic and historic Évangéline."

L'Évangéline covered topics such as education, hygiene, agriculture, language, religion, and the press. Reflecting the political leanings of its founder, the newspaper aligned closely with the Liberal Party. Landry’s aggressive journalism often advanced the Acadian cause but also frequently faced threats of legal action due to his provocative editorials.

To counter Landry, Father Jules Lanos, a professor at Saint Anne’s College, launched the newspaper L'Acadie on August 8, 1900, in Weymouth, on L'Évangéline’s own turf. Lanos also challenged Landry’s English publication by starting the Sissiboo Echo. In his newspapers, Lanos criticized Landry’s nationalist fervor, sparking a bitter feud. Other newspapers joined the fray, and Acadian leaders eventually called for an end to the disputes, deeming them more harmful than beneficial to the Acadians. L'Acadie ceased publication in June 1904, allowing Landry to relocate to Moncton in 1905 without "yielding to the enemy."

In 1905, Landry moved L'Évangéline to Moncton, New Brunswick, where two-thirds of its 3,000 subscribers resided. His fierce attacks on the Irish clergy and religious authorities drew sharp rebukes in 1909 from the papal representative, who, in 1910, urged members of the Assumption Society in the Moncton area to offer "neither encouragement nor aid to L'Évangéline, as this paper [was] not animated by a true Catholic spirit."

=== Institutional period ===
To ensure the newspaper’s survival, Landry transferred ownership of L'Évangéline to a small group of shareholders in June 1910, and it joined the Catholic Press League. Clerical oversight significantly altered the tone of its editorials, replacing openness to modernity with a conservative stance.

In July 1931, L'Évangéline became a daily newspaper but reverted to a weekly schedule in August 1932 due to the economic crisis. From 1937 to 1944, it was published as La Voix d’Évangéline. It permanently adopted a daily format on September 12, 1949, with nearly 8,000 subscribers.

In the 1950s, L'Évangéline played a significant role in Acadian nationalism, but its tone shifted in the 1960s. A new wave of change swept through New Brunswick, driven by the modernization efforts of Louis Robichaud’s government. This led younger generations to question the established social order, with which L'Évangéline was associated, rightly or wrongly. Meanwhile, the Acadian elite criticized the newspaper for positioning Moncton as the center of Acadia.

Facing mounting deficits, the newspaper relied on public fundraising to survive. In 1965, it came under the administration of L'Assomption Mutuelle-Vie, and in 1974, it was transferred to a nonprofit organization, Les Œuvres de Presse Acadiennes.

=== Closure ===
Despite technical assistance from France and a subscriber base that peaked at 21,000 in 1980, L'Imprimerie Acadienne Ltée, the publisher of L'Évangéline, reported a deficit of $800,000 and a debt of $600,000 on August 31, 1982. Combined with internal conflicts—employees’ unions and management blamed each other for the newspaper’s decline—this forced L'Imprimerie Acadienne to cease publication on September 27, 1982, laying off over 100 employees.

With the demise of L'Évangéline, New Brunswick lost its only French-language daily newspaper. Acadians were left without a daily platform in their language, relying instead on English-language print media. It took two years for the northeast of the province to regain a daily newspaper with L'Acadie Nouvelle, and another two years for the rest of the province with the short-lived Le Matin.

== Contributors ==
Father Anselme Chiasson published an anonymous column titled "Le coin à Piquine" in L'Évangéline in 1971 and 1972, featuring articles on Acadian traditions and social commentary.

François de Vernal, a journalist, professor, and writer—whose roughly twenty plays were produced by Radio-Canada—wrote a daily editorial for L'Évangéline. Additionally, France Daigle worked as a journalist at the newspaper from 1973 to 1977. The newspaper is the central subject of her novel 1953: Chronique d'une naissance annoncée.

== See also ==
- Acadians
- Valentin Landry
- Mass media in Acadia
