= Valentin Landry =

Canadian journalist (1844–1919)

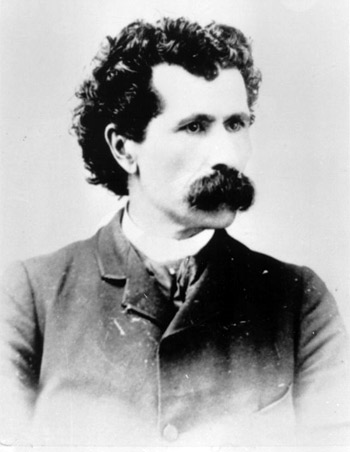
- Born: February 14, 1844; Pokemouche, New Brunswick
- Died: May 17, 1919 (aged 75); Moncton, New Brunswick
- Occupations: school inspector, journalist

Valentin Landry (February 14, 1844 – May 17, 1919) was a Canadian educator and journalist of Acadian descent. His name also appears as Valentin Augustus Landry and Valentin-A. Landry.

The son of Joseph-Auguste Landry and Olive Robichaud, he was born in Pokemouche, New Brunswick and was educated there and in Shediac and at Westmorland Grammar School, where he received a commercial studies diploma, and later continued his education at St. Joseph's College. He taught school in Weymouth and then earned his teacher's certificate from the normal school in Truro.

Landry's great great grandfather Alexis Landry helped found Caraquet, New Brunswick.

In 1870, Landry married Mary Lavinia Beckwith, also a teacher. The couple then taught school in Beaver River, Weymouth and Plympton. Landry ran for the Digby County seat in the provincial assembly in 1878 as a Liberal but withdrew to join the preparatory division of the normal school at Fredericton. From 1879 to 1886, he was a school inspector for, the first Acadian to hold such a post.

In 1885, Landry helped found the newspaper Courrier des provinces Maritimes in Bathurst and served on its board of directors until 1887. In 1886, he moved to Digby, where he founded L'Évangéline; he moved the newspaper to Weymouth in 1889. In the same year, he established an English-language newspaper the Free Press with his wife. Landry moved L’Évangéline to New Brunswick in 1905. In 1910, to ensure the continued operation of the newspaper after attracting the opposition of the Catholic Church, he transferred its ownership to a separate company and relinquished the position of editor. The paper continued to operate until 1982.

Letters written by Émilie Leblanc under the name Marichette were published in Landry's newspaper until 1898 although, in April 1895, he expressed his opposition to providing a platform for women's views because he was opposed to women's suffrage.

Landry also played an active role at several Conventions Nationale des Acadiens.

His first wife died in 1910; he married her niece Mary U. Beckwith in 1913. Landry later died in Moncton at the age of 75.
