= CKRO-FM =

Radio station in Pokemouche, New Brunswick

Coordinates: 47°40′45″N 64°52′19″W

- Pokemouche, New Brunswick; Canada
- Frequency: 97.1 MHz

Programming
- Language: French

Ownership
- Owner: Radio Peninsule Inc.

History
- First air date: July 18, 1988

Technical information
- Class: B
- ERP: 37.8 kWs average 44.4 kWs peak
- HAAT: 55.5 metres (182 ft)

Links
- Website: www.ckro.ca

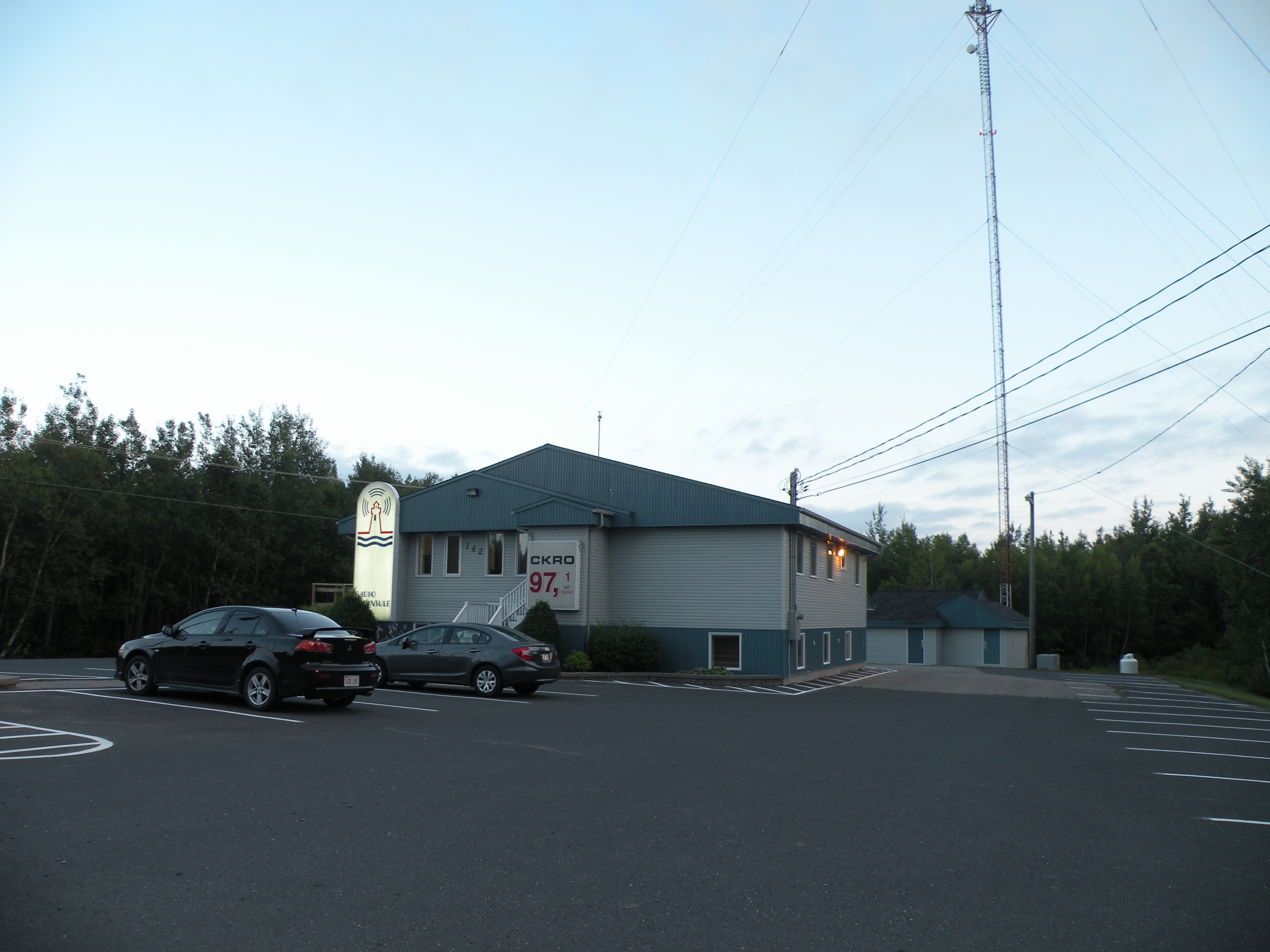
CKRO's studios and antenna in Pokemouche, New Brunswick.

CKRO-FM is a Canadian radio station, which broadcasts at 97.1 FM in the Pokemouche-Caraquet region of New Brunswick. The station airs a French language community radio format for the region's Acadian community.

== History ==
This station received CRTC approval on July 20, 1987. CKRO-FM officially began broadcasting at 97.1 FM on July 18, 1988.

The station is a member of the Alliance des radios communautaires du Canada.
