= Le Courrier de la Nouvelle-Écosse =

Acadian newspaper published in Nova Scotia

Le Courrier de la Nouvelle-Ecosse
- Type: Weekly newspaper
- Format: Broadsheet
- Owner(s): Féderation Francophone (Acadienne) de la Nouvelle-Écosse
- Founded: 1937
- Language: French
- Headquarters: Meteghan River, Nova Scotia
- Website: lecourrier.com

Le Courrier de la Nouvelle-Écosse is an Acadian newspaper published in southwest Nova Scotia, Canada.

== History ==
The newspaper was created by Désiré d'Eon in 1937 in response to the lack of opportunities to read in the French language in southwestern Nova Scotia.

Nova Scotia Archives and Records Management have recently digitized 3,419 issues of the newspaper, comprising 68,352 pages, covering 1937 to 2002. This is considered an important historical resource for Nova Scotia's francophone community.

== Content ==
The paper covers the community interest in the Acadian area.

A TV listing page, called Tele Guide, provides the listings for television schedule for the Canadian television networks, including the ones broadcasting from Detroit, Michigan.
