= L'Acadie Nouvelle =

Canadian newspaper in New Brunswick

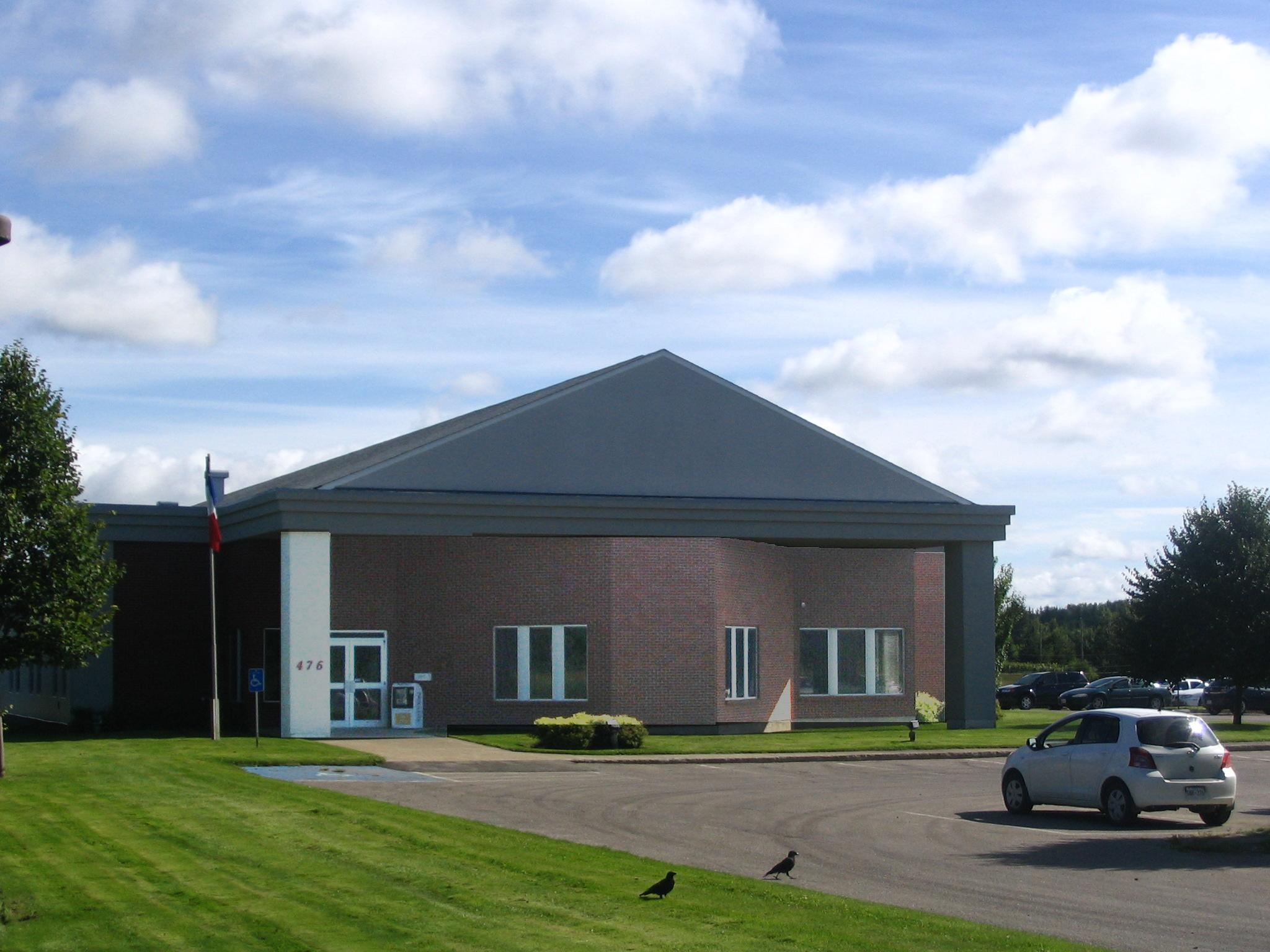
- Offices of L'Acadie Nouvelle in Caraquet
- Type: Daily newspaper
- Owner: Les Éditions de L'Acadie Nouvelle (1984) Ltée
- Founded: 1984
- Language: French
- Headquarters: 476 West St Peter Blvd; Caraquet, New Brunswick; E1W 1B6
- ISSN: 0829-1667
- Website: www.acadienouvelle.com

L'Acadie Nouvelle is an independent French newspaper published in Caraquet, New Brunswick, Canada since June 6, 1984. It is published from Monday through Saturday and is the only French-language daily newspaper in New Brunswick.

== History ==
The newspaper was established following the closure of L'Évangéline (Acadian newspaper), in October 1982. The initial financing of the project was made possible with a fund-raising campaign raising CA$350,000, mostly from Acadian communities in the Province.

The newspaper was originally distributed in the area of Gloucester County. The paper was written and edited in Caraquet and printed in Miramichi by the Miramichi Leader Newspaper. Within its first three years, L'Acadie Nouvelle increased its readership from 5,700 to 12,000 copies.

After the creation of Acadie Presse Inc., a commercial printer, in 1988, the newspaper has been printed in Caraquet. L'Acadie Nouvelle and Acadie Presse Inc. merged in 2002.

In 1989, the newspaper hired permanent journalists in Campbellton, Edmundston, Fredericton and Moncton. On September 5 of the same year, it extended the distribution to all of New Brunswick. In 1992, an office was opened in Dieppe to better serve southern New Brunswick.

Originally published from Monday to Friday, a Saturday edition was added in August 2003. Currently, the paper sells 20,000 daily subscriptions reaching 43,000 readers, as well as 71,000 weekly subscriptions.

While founded as an independent newspaper, it outsourced its printing to the Brunswick News media conglomerate, which owns the other newspapers in New Brunswick. The decision led to a savings of a million dollars, but led to the loss of twenty jobs with the Acadie Presse printing facility in Caraquet. The printing press at the Acadie Presse facility was dismantled and sent to Egypt.

In 2026, the paper announced it will cut back its print editions from five to two a week.

== Columnists, and journalists ==
The daily L'Acadie Nouvelle counts or has counted among its editorialists, columnists and journalists, personalities such as:

- Philippe Bernier Arcand, columnist
- Gabriel Arseneau, columnist
- Serge Comeau, columnist
- Stéphanie Chouinard, columnist
- France Daigle, columnist
- Françoise Enguehard, columnist
- François Gravel, editorial writer
- Marc Poirier, columnist
- Rino Morin Rossignol, columnist
- Richard Saillant, columnist

== See also ==
- List of newspapers in Canada
