= Acadian theatre =

Theatrical productions from Acadia

Acadian theatre refers to theatrical productions that originate from or are perceived as originating from Acadia. (Note: Acadia includes the northern and eastern parts of the Canadian province of New Brunswick, as well as isolated localities in Prince Edward Island, Newfoundland and Labrador, and Nova Scotia. It also refers to Acadian diaspora communities in Quebec and the United States; people of Acadian descent are also found in France, the Falkland Islands, and the Caribbean. Acadia is not officially recognized but forms a nation through its language, culture, institutions, and symbols.) The most prominent playwright is Antonine Maillet, whose play La Sagouine has been staged over two thousand times, with Viola Léger as the sole Actor.

== History ==
The inaugural theatrical production, Théâtre de Neptune, was created by Marc Lescarbot in 1606. However, the theatre did not emerge again for two centuries due to the challenging socio-economic and political context. Nevertheless, the oral tradition continued to flourish, with evening gatherings and their storytellers exerting a significant influence that can still be observed today. From 1864 onwards, Acadian colleges began to develop theatrical activities, with notable examples including the establishment of St. Joseph College in Memramcook by Camille Lefebvre. Professors such as Alexandre Braud and Jean-Baptiste Jégo created viral plays, often with nationalist or religious themes. Parish productions also emerged, though their focus was not on playwriting, with only Pascal Poirier and James Branch writing real plays. The first independent troupes were founded in the 1950s, marking a decline in the influence of colleges and the Church.

The production of Les Crasseux by Antonine Maillet in 1968 is regarded as the inaugural event in the history of Acadian theatre. The following year, a drama program was established at the Université de Moncton, which produced numerous artists and craftsmen. The troupes Les Feux Chalins and the Théâtre Amateur de Moncton were founded in the same year. In 1971, Antonine Maillet's La Sagouine achieved remarkable success following its staging at the Théâtre du Rideau Vert in Montreal in 1972.

The Popular Theatre of Acadia, the inaugural professional troupe, was established in 1974 in Caraquet. Its productions included Louis Mailloux by Jules Boudreau and Calixte Duguay, and Le Djibou by Laval Goupil. The Théâtre l'Escaouette was established in 1977 in Moncton, providing a significant platform for the work of multidisciplinary artist Herménégilde Chiasson. Antonine Maillet continued her career in both theatre and literature. The Acadian theatre diversified in genres and themes. The TPA focused on repertoire, while Théâtre l'Escaouette favored creation. Playwriting improved, but the lack of Acadian texts was a significant challenge.

The challenging economic climate of the 1980s compelled the Viola-Léger Company to cease operations in 1989, three years after its establishment, while other troupes canceled productions. The troupes redirected their efforts towards productions for children, where Herménégilde Chiasson's texts were particularly noteworthy. In 1992, the Théâtre du Pays de la Sagouine was established in Bouctouche, based on Antonine Maillet's work, which she continued to supply with texts. Over time, the number of plays published increased. Theatre underwent a resurgence in the mid-1990s, with the establishment of new troupes, including Moncton Sable in 1996, and the emergence of new playwrights such as Gracia Couturier. However, Herménégilde Chiasson retained a significant influence. The presence of Quebec productions attracted criticism. Nevertheless, a few new financial and critical successes, including the revival of Louis Mailloux, and the founding of festivals, highlighted distinctly Acadian creations.

=== Origins ===
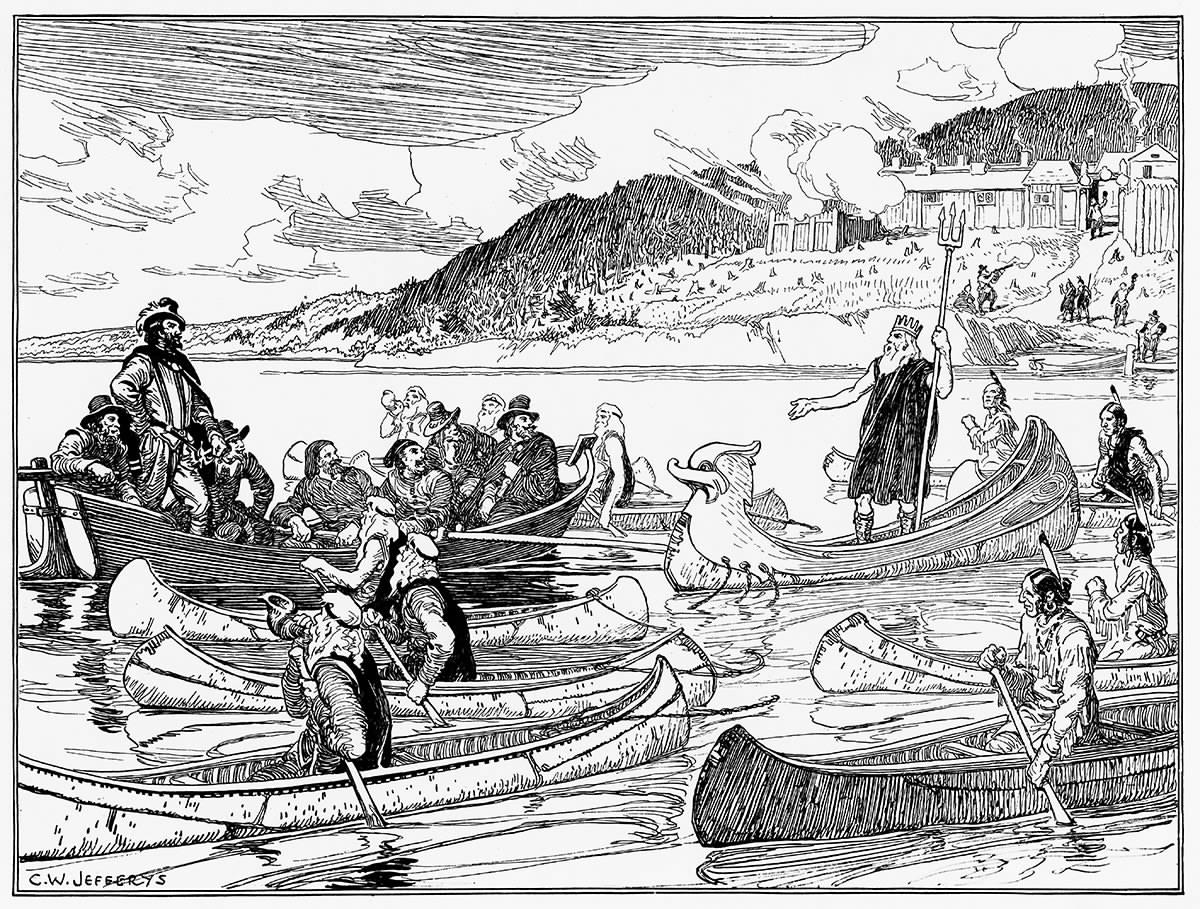
Presentation of the Théâtre de Neptune facing the Port-Royal dwelling. Drawing by Charles William Jefferys.

In 1606 Marc Lescarbot presented Théâtre de Neptune in Port-Royal, a nautical fantasy in Alexandrines commemorating the arrival of Jean de Poutrincourt in Acadia. This is likely the first play produced in North America.

For nearly three centuries following Marc Lescarbot's time, Acadia had no theatre. The slow population growth and strategic Acadian situation, which resulted in numerous wars, explain why the texts produced are not comparable to those of Canada or France. There were few artists and no professional or community organizations, and the Deportation of the Acadians (1755–1763) did not favor this either. The English, who took possession of a portion of Acadia in 1713, introduced their culture to the region, yet the Acadians were largely isolated from this influence.

After the Deportation, there was no further literature produced by the Acadians. However, an oral tradition flourished, resulting in the preservation of stories, legends, and songs that continue to be passed down to the present day. Evening gatherings, particularly during the winter months, were a popular pastime, often involving a storyteller. The Acadians became a minority and were dispersed across the three Maritime Provinces. Their Catholic faith contributed to the establishment of several organizations. A rudimentary school system began to emerge in the mid-19th century.

=== College Theatre ===
==== St. Joseph College ====
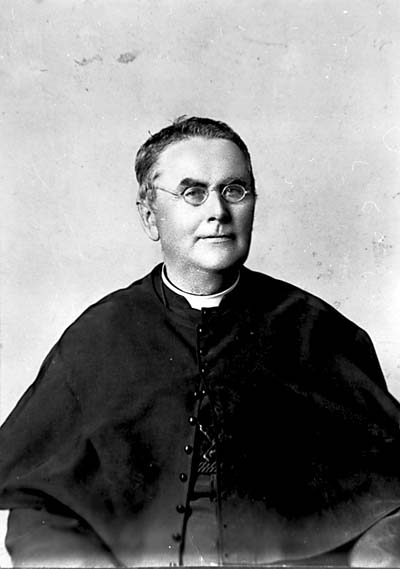
Camille Lefebvre, founder of St. Joseph's College and Académie Saint-Jean-Baptiste.

Colleges (Note: These institutions are traditionally described as colleges, but several have obtained university status.) played a pivotal role in the evolution of theatre, particularly St. Joseph's College in Memramcook. While some sessions commenced from its inception in 1864, it was on October 11, 1866, that the superior, Camille Lefebvre, established the Académie Saint-Jean-Baptiste, the inaugural theatrical society in Acadia. He was inspired by similar academies in Quebec colleges he had attended and by his experience as a liseux or storyteller.

The academy was presided over by a student and directed by a professor, who also acted as the director. The choice of texts had to be approved by the college administration. The first president was François-Xavier Cormier, and the first director was G. Demers. Camille Lefebvre served as president from 1867 to 1872, a period during which the academy's rules were established. In 1894, a new constitution was adopted, which among other things, established committees. Another notable president was A.D. Cormier, who served from 1878. The academy's objective was to educate students in elocution and oratory and to promote the study of literature. Sessions were presented every month before other students and, on occasion, before the general public.

Pascal Poirier asserts that the academy presented "real theatre, with real plays," including works by Molière. Some of these plays were abridged. Melodramas and "homicidal tragedies" were the most favored genres by the administration. In the absence of available texts, professors and, on occasion, students occasionally composed their plays.

The public sessions were extremely popular, with attendance sometimes exceeding one thousand individuals in poorly ventilated rooms. Sessions commenced at approximately 6:30 p.m. and could last up to six hours, with the theatrical portion occupying only a portion of the evening. The remainder of the evening was devoted to singing, music, speeches, declamations, and other forms of entertainment. A tableau vivant was often performed after a performance to highlight the costumes and scenery. Students constructed their costumes, but in some instances, costumes were purchased in Montreal. Plays were presented in both English and French. Over time, performances became shorter and increasingly homogeneous in terms of language used. In 1874, for instance, Irish English-speaking students at the college founded the Saint-Patrick Literary and Dramatic Society. Given that the college was exclusively male, female roles were often played by boys, who were sometimes "masculinized" or outright eliminated. This practice was subsequently adopted by other institutions within the Francophone world. However, female students from Notre-Dame d'Acadie College were admitted from the 1950s onwards to perform female roles.

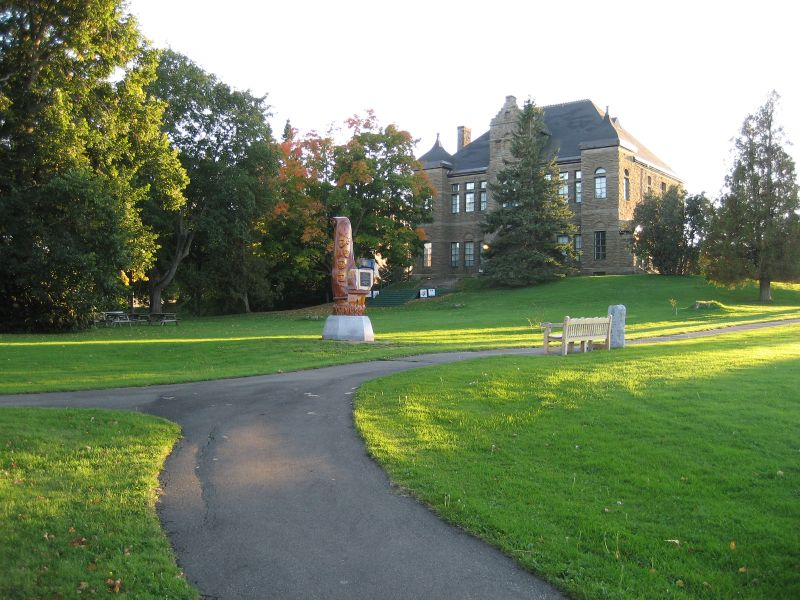
The Monument Lefebvre, the first true Acadian theater

Following the death of Father Lefebvre, a decision was made to construct a new hall. The Monument Lefebvre was inaugurated in 1897. The inaugural major performance, the original production of Les Piastres rouges, took place on March 18, 1898, and enjoyed a prolonged period of popularity. A multitude of cultural events were held at the Monument Lefebvre, and theatrical performances were often secondary to declamation exercises. This led to the establishment of the Société bilingue in 1900. The academy was subsequently divided into three societies: the Cercle Stella Maris for philosophy and rhetoric, the Cercle Lefebvre (retaining the name Saint-Jean-Baptiste for initiates), and the Cercle Saint-Joseph for younger students. Theatrical activity continued with the presentation of "great pathetic and tearful dramas and light comedies," according to Jean-Claude Marcus. This was the era of vaudeville, operettas, and comic operas.

Molière's The Imaginary Invalid, directed by Father Leduc in 1941, contributed to the rehabilitation of college theatre. The prefect of studies, Father Clément Cormier, then proposed the establishment of a comprehensive drama program; in reality, only a few courses were offered. The subsequent main plays presented were Scapin the Schemer in 1946, followed by The Curse, The Passion, and The Poor Under the Stairs in 1949. There were no further plays presented in 1951, but a drama circle was established and presented Henri Ghéon's Christmas on the Square in December, followed by The Bourgeois Gentleman in 1952. In 1953, Father Maurice Chamard assumed the direction of The Bourgeois Gentleman, which garnered first prize at the provincial theatre festival in Fredericton and a second-place finish at a festival in Victoria. He replicated this success in 1954 in Fredericton with Scapin the Schemer and in 1956 in Newcastle with The Miser. In addition to the aforementioned plays by Molière, the circle also produced Jules Romains' Knock or the Triumph of Medicine.

In 1960, Father Jean-Guy Gagnon assumed leadership of the troupe La Cordée de la Rampe. The company existed for a relatively brief period, yet it presented many notable productions, including Paul de Néha's La Cloche d'argent, René William's L'Échelle de Saint-Joseph,Léon Chancerel's The Comedian in the Fields, Molière's La Jalousie du barbouillé, Henri Ghéon's The Farce of the Hanged Man, Marcel Dubé's Zone, and Thornton Wilder's Our Town.

The University of Moncton was founded in 1963, and St. Joseph College became associated with it before its closure in 1972. Theatrical activities commenced in Moncton in 1966, with Luiz Saraïva offering drama classes and presenting a few plays to the public.

==== Saint-Louis College ====
The Saint-Louis College, located in Saint-Louis-de-Kent, opened its doors in 1874 and held several sessions, which were open to the public. The college was attended by French-speaking Acadians and a few English-speaking Irish students. Sessions were conducted in both languages, and roles were assigned regardless of the students' mother tongue, as they were proficient in both languages. However, following the session on July 5, 1882, Bishop James Rogers expressed his concerns to the audience, stating that the college was "too French" and that this was detrimental to English-speaking students. He subsequently closed the institution.

==== Sainte-Anne College ====
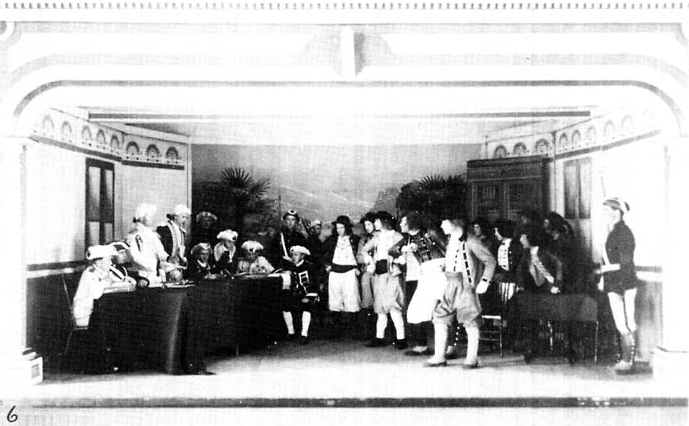
Second painting in the drama of the Acadian people: "Les Acadiens devant le conseil anglais" ("The Acadians before the English council").

The Sainte-Anne College was established in 1890 in Pointe-de-l'Église. In 1892, the Saint-Patrick Literary Society was founded at the institution, followed by the Saint-Joseph Literary Society in 1893. The inaugural theatrical production, La Malédiction d'un père, was presented in 1893. This play had originally been created at St. Joseph College in 1888. In 1898, Father Alexandre Braud, a rhetoric professor, presented Les Derniers martyrs du Colisée, a three-act verse drama. This was another of his successes. Subercase, a historical three-act verse drama presented in 1902, was another of his successes. The play, which featured Daniel d'Auger de Subercase, the last governor of Acadia, aimed to revive patriotism. The hero exclaims, "Vive la France! l'Acadie et l'Église!" (Long live France! Acadia and the Church!). In 1930, Jean-Baptiste Jégo presented Le Drame du peuple acadien, a series of ten scenes on the history of Acadia, to rekindle young people's interest in history. The play was a resounding success, performed on three occasions and awarded by the French Academy. Émile Lauvrière even attempted to persuade Father Jégo to film the play. Jégo also produced La Passion de notre seigneur in 1928 and Joseph in 1929. In several of his plays, he transcended the nationalist theme by emphasizing the struggle for freedom of education.

==== Sacré-Cœur College ====
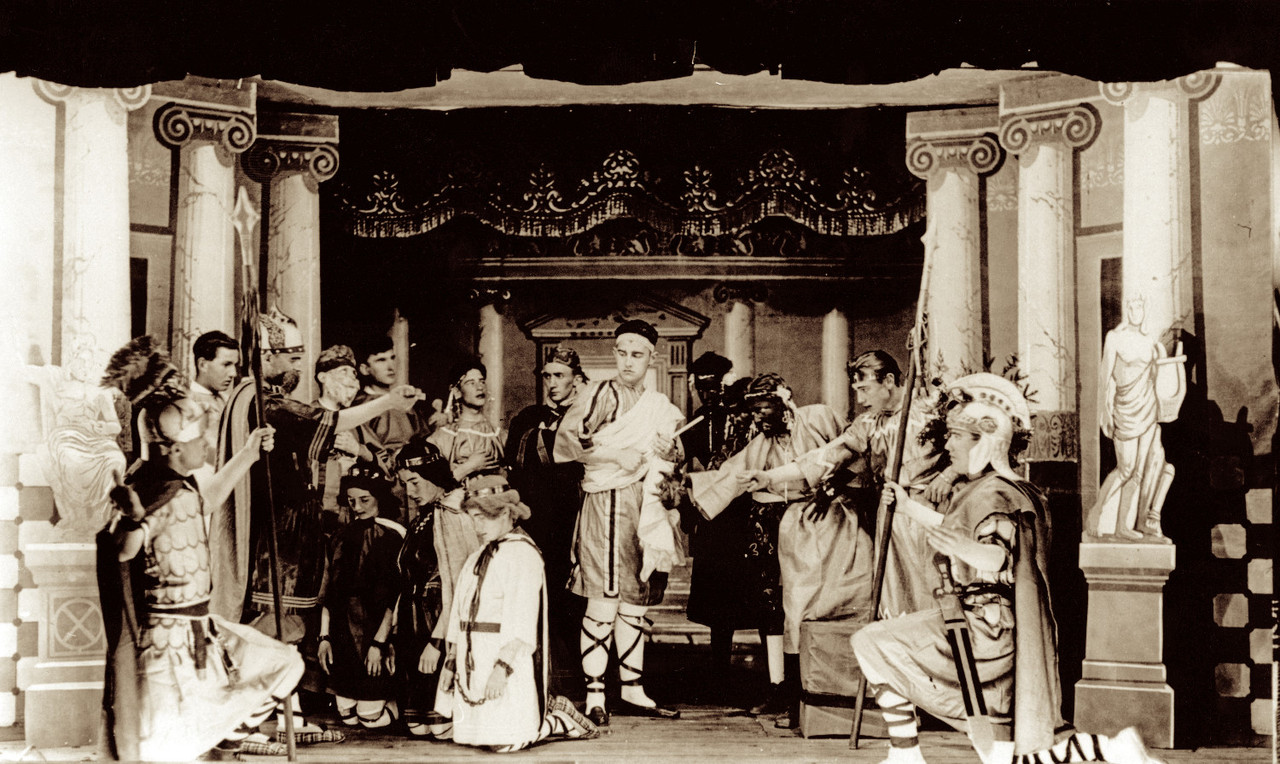
Les Chrétiens aux lions, a play by Father Joseph Thomas presented at Sacré-Cœur College in 1930.

The Sacré-Cœur College opened in Caraquet in 1899, and the inaugural session commenced shortly thereafter. The program included an operetta in English and a vaudeville by Anthony Mars, Le Docteur Oscar. The play Monsieur Gavroche, by the same author, was a notable success in 1900. Other noteworthy plays included the verse drama Vercingétorix (1906), written by Fathers Bizeul and Jourand, and La Passion (1909), a series of living tableaux. Both plays were reprised.

The college was destroyed by fire in 1914 and subsequently rebuilt in Bathurst in 1921. During the 1930s, Simon Larouche and Joseph Thomas directed the theater troupe, which presented three to four plays annually. In 1941, a real theater was established, but it did not attract a significant audience, as the residents of Bathurst were reluctant to attend French-language performances. This perception was shared by Marcel Tremblay. In the following decade, Ligori Roy and Georges-André Gaudet led the troupe. Father Gaudet used lighting effects and stylized sets, staging plays by Léon Chacerel and Brochet. In 1949, the college organized a pageant by Maurice Lacasse Morenoff and Laurent Tremblay, renowned across the country for such events. Featuring 200 participants, the event traced the college's history. Gérard Dugas, followed by Michel Savard, directed the troupe until the theater burned down in 1961. Maurice Blanc assumed the role of director until 1974, renaming the troupe Théâtre du Collège de Bathurst (TCB) and organizing tours. TCB received numerous awards for its productions of works by Molière, Pierre-Augustin Caron de Beaumarchais, Eugène Labiche, Carlo Goldoni, and Federico García Lorca.

==== Convents ====
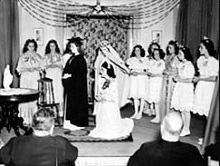
A session given by Notre-Dame d'Acadie College students in 1947 in Bouctouche.

Nuns played an instrumental role in the dissemination of artistic knowledge, organizing hundreds of instructional sessions beginning in 1872. These sessions were comparable to those held in colleges and were typically publicized in newspapers, though they retained a certain degree of exclusivity. They proved highly appealing to many young women with an interest in the arts, inspiring some of them to go on to establish literary and dramatic circles, debate societies, and other French-speaking cultural organizations.

=== Parish theater ===
From the 1870s onwards theater became a popular pastime at the parish level. During the Acadian Renaissance, as Acadia experienced a period of significant socio-economic change, the role of the storyteller diminished, while people engaged in a greater variety of activities outside the home. Acadian theater can be considered an extension of the evening gatherings. Notably, at this time, people avoided using the term "theater" and preferred terms such as "session," "recreational evening," "concert," or "amateur evening." This usage appears to have been due to the nature of the performances, which often included singing and music and did not necessarily fit a strict definition of theater. It was mainly to avoid confusing these performances with cinema —also called theater in its early days— which was condemned by the clergy. The theater itself had often been criticized by the clergy in Quebec.

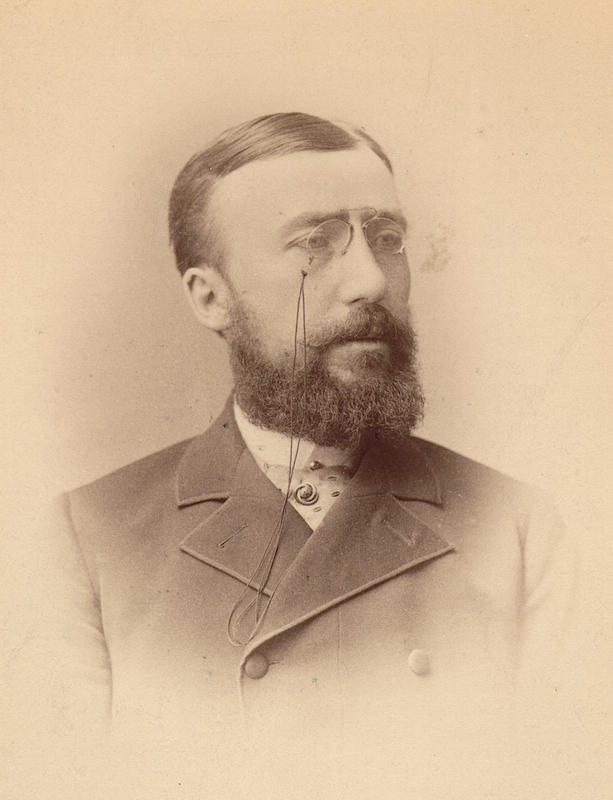
Nationalists like Pascal Poirier get involved in the production of parish sessions.

Nevertheless, the clergy actively promoted and frequently prepared theatrical performances, which were more appreciated by priests than dances and, in any case, often allowed for fundraising. In such instances, the day's activities would often culminate in a comic play.

Following the session a patriotic speech was sometimes delivered, which could include patriotic songs. The impact of elocution training in Acadian colleges was also a contributing factor to the success of the sessions. In contrast to Quebec, the nationalist movement exerted a considerable influence on the theatre. While the plays were not always explicitly political, they constituted an opportunity to use French in public and contributed to the vitality of the Acadian language and culture. Following the 1881, the Acadian Renaissance held in Memramcook, numerous organizations were established to organize sessions and debates. From that year onwards, National Acadian Day was frequently celebrated with theatrical performances. Following the establishment of the Mutual Society of the Assumption (now Assomption Life) in 1903 in Waltham, Massachusetts, numerous branches were opened in various Acadian communities, to promote the French language, notably through the organization of sessions.

Despite the growing interest in collegiate theater at the same time, only two authors wrote for the stage: Pascal Poirier, with his romantic drama Les Acadiens à Philadelphie, and James Branch, with several plays including L'émigrant acadien. Playwriting took longer to develop in Acadia than other forms of writing.

The number of performances declined from the 1940s onwards, as the nationalist movement waned. Theatre no longer served as a vehicle for national identity politics and French language promotion and was supplanted by other leisure activities such as bingo, sports, cinema, and television.

=== 1950s and 1960s: First independent troupes ===
The inaugural theatrical ensemble, the Troupe Notre-Dame de Grâce de Moncton, was established by Laurie Henri in 1956. Specializing in religious theater, the troupe was not as influential as its founder, who exerted a considerable impact on an entire generation of artists and artisans.

The Théâtre de la Virgule was established in 1957 by employees of Société Radio-Canada. Its inaugural production, Les Folies amoureuses by French dramatist Jean-François Regnard, was the inaugural independent French-language play to be considered for the provincial drama competition. It was rejected, as the adjudicator lacked proficiency in French, prompting a plea for bilingualism by L'Évangéline editorialist Émery Leblanc. The inaugural Acadian troupes frequently ceased to exist following a single financial or aesthetic misstep.

But 1957 was not a disappointing year for Acadian theater, as Notre-Dame d'Acadie College presented Antonine Maillet's play Poire-Acre at the same competition. This play won the prize for the best Canadian play the following year. Antonine Maillet had distinguished herself at the Canadian competition the previous year with her play Entre'acte. Cécile Maillet, the director of the majority of the college's plays, was awarded a Canada Council for the Arts at the Canada Theatre Festival in 1960. Between 1960 and 1965, the troupe La Cordée de la rampe presented a repertoire that included French plays, a few Quebecois plays, and no Acadian plays. Nevertheless, its repertoire was more diverse than might be expected.

=== Antonine Maillet and Les Feux chalins ===
The year 1968 is regarded as the true inception of Acadian theatre with the publication of Antonine Maillet's play Les Crasseux. This dramatic comedy foreshadowed La Sagouine with its characters and language; the Sagouine appeared among the characters in the play.

The year saw the liberation of the performing arts from the influence of the Church and colleges, as evidenced by the founding of two troupes: Les Feux chalins and the Théâtre Amateur de Moncton (TAM). The latter was the successor to the troupe founded by Laurie Henri in 1956. Both troupes were semi-professional. In 1971, Les Feux chalins presented Antonine Maillet's La Sagouine, with Viola Léger in the lead role. La Sagouine is a play about survival, written in a militant and ostracized language, Acadian French. The eponymous heroine testifies not only about Acadia but about all the oppressed. Following its presentation at Théâtre du Rideau Vert in Montreal in 1972, Antonine Maillet's La Sagouine enjoyed immense success, establishing her as an internationally renowned author. It was this theatre that produced her subsequent plays. Les Feux chalins staged Antonine Maillet's work again in 1974.

Les Feux Chauds also facilitates workshops for young people. They also produced the puppet show Pépère Goguen et les ratons laveurs by Jean Perronet, which has been a considerable success and was showcased at the International Puppet Festival of Prague in 1974. In that year, the troupe produced Tête d'eau, a play written and directed by Laval Goupil, a young artist who also played the lead role. In 1975, the troupe afforded Jules Boudreau and his second play, La Bringue, an opportunity. Boudreau had established the troupe Les Élouèzes in his hometown of Maisonnette, near Caraquet, thereby enabling him to stage his inaugural plays. Les Feux chalins concentrate on local artists and artisans but also produce plays by other troupes, including Les Élouèzes.

=== Professionalization ===
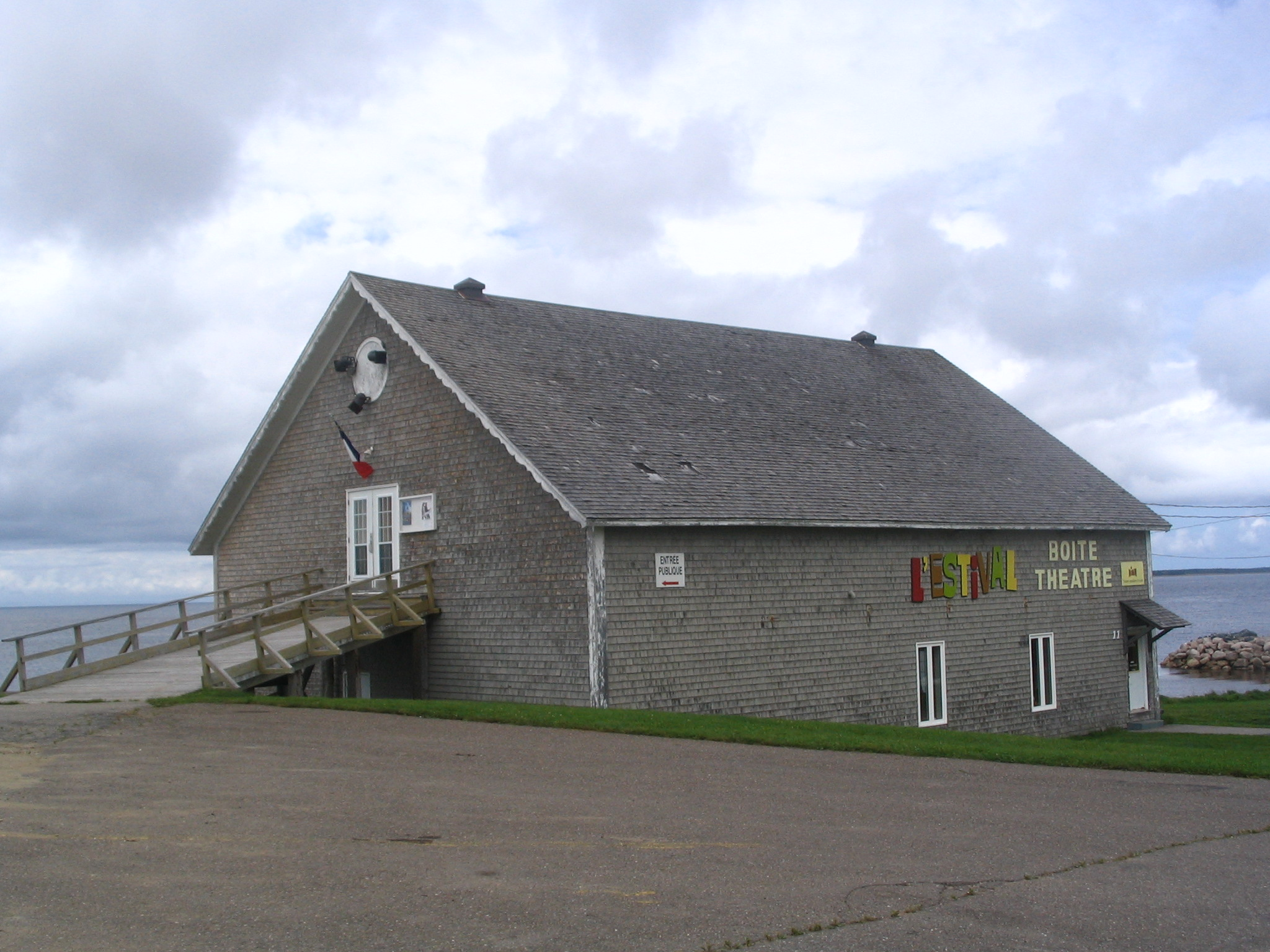
The Boîte-Théâtre, used during the summer since 1974 by the Théâtre populaire d'Acadie.

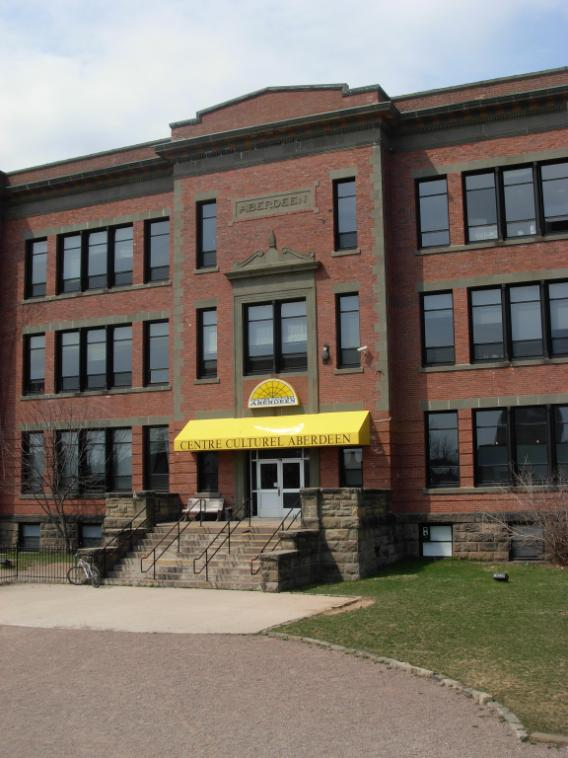
Aberdeen Cultural Center, home to the Escaouette theater from 1992 to 2004.

The University of Moncton has offered drama courses since 1966. In 1974, Father Maurice Chamard, desirous of perpetuating the theatrical tradition of St. Joseph College in Memramcook, established a comprehensive bachelor's program and a drama department. Artists and craftsmen such as Eugène Gallant, Claire Ifrane, Jean-Claude Marcus, Manuel Pereira, and Luiz Saraïva contributed to the department's growth. The department's contribution to Acadian theater is unquestionable; however, it has been jeopardized on multiple occasions due to budgetary constraints. Had the recommendations outlined in the "Blue Report" or "Ross Report" been implemented, the bachelor's degree would have been downgraded to a minor status.

The Popular Theatre of Acadia (TPA) of Caraquet was established in 1974 from Jules Boudreau's Théâtre des Élouèzes and Les Productions de l'Étoile by Laval Goupil, Maurice Arsenault, and Réjean Poirier, both of which were founded earlier that year. The troupe was inspired by Jean Vilar and aims to make professional plays accessible to as many localities as possible. The organization's board of directors is composed of individuals from various Acadian regions. The troupe serves as a foundational element within the Acadian theatrical landscape, alongside the University of Moncton's drama department. Initially situated within the Boîte-Théâtre, a repurposed former warehouse, the TPA subsequently relocated to the Old convent. However, the Boîte-Théâtres continues to serve as a venue for summer productions.

In what Paul-Émile Richard termed a "cultural vandalism," Les Feux Chaleurs ceased operations in 1976, paving the way for TAM to assume control of the field. The troupe presented a diverse array of performances, catering to both school and adult audiences. In 1975, the troupe presented Hugette Légaré in her play Les Tombes de Madame Mélanie, directed by Laval Goupil, and Roger Leblanc in Kouchibou quoi?, a children's show. In 1976, the troupe introduced Germaine Comeau, a Nova Scotian, and her play Les Pêcheurs déportés. TAM reached a high point in 1977 with the presentation of Les Crasseux by Antonine Maillet, directed by Jean-Claude Marcus at the Monument Lefebvre in Memramcook. The troupe ceased production of plays in 1983, under the name Théâtre Laurie-Henri. Les Feux chalins and TAM sparked interest in theatrical activity in southeastern New Brunswick that was not tied to educational institutions and paved the way for the first professional troupes.

The Théâtre l'Escaouette originated from the Moncton Amateur Theatre in either 1977 or 1978, according to the available sources. Its initial membership was composed predominantly of drama graduates from the University of Moncton. The troupe was initially a cooperative, and it was named after an Acadian dance from Candlemas. The artistic directors of the theatre included Roger Leblanc from 1978 to 1984, Eugène Gallant until 1987, Katherine Kilfoil until 1989, and Maurice Arsenault from 1989 to 1995. The troupe initially concentrated on youth theater, a field that was not yet served by the TPA. In 1978, Laval Goupil adapted Ti-Jean, a series of tales by Melvin Gallant inspired by Acadian folklore. Between 1978 and 1989, the troupe produced 23 plays by twelve authors, with Herménégilde Chiasson being the only one to produce a significant body of work, with nine titles. He is credited with authoring the inaugural two classics of youth theater, Mine de rien (1980) and Atarelle et les Pacmaniens (1983). Additionally, he composed two historical plays: Histoire en histoire (1980), which details the life of Nicolas Denys, and Renaissances (1984), which chronicles pivotal moments in the past century, specifically the hundredth anniversary of the Acadian flag. These two plays constitute a trilogy with Les Sentiers de l'espoir (1983) by Gérald Leblanc, which concerns the life of Joseph Guéguen, the founder of Cocagne. Évangéline, mythe ou réalité (1982) by Herménégilde Chiasson was directed by Roméo Savoie with music by Denis Richard. The show was performed eight times in La Rochelle, France.

The TPA saw the appointment of three artistic directors during the 1970s and 1980s. These were Réjean Poirier (1974–1984), Dominique Lavallée (1984–1987), and Andreï Zaharia (1987–1993). During this period, more than sixty plays were produced, many of which were original creations. In 1975, TPA presented the inaugural production by Jules Boudreau, Louis Mailloux, a musical drama written in collaboration with Calixte Duguay about the Louis Mailloux Affair. This play, from the Jeune Théâtre, was met with such acclaim that it was performed again in 1976, 1978, and 1981, each time under the direction of Réjean Poirier. The play was then directed by Andréï Zaharia in 1992 and published by Éditions d'Acadie in 1994. This play remains a staple, though according to David Lonergan, it belongs to the 1970s in both form and content. Jules Boudreau authored or participated in six other TPA plays, including Cochu et le Soleil (1977), an inventive version of the Acadian deportation. In addition to historical themes, Jules Boudreau also explored contemporary subjects with a humorous approach. In 1975, TPA performed Le Djibou by Laval Goupil, which was revived in 1982 and 1985 and at the Grand Théâtre de Québec. One of Herménégilde Chiasson's early plays, the social drama L'Amer à boire, was featured in 1977. It is noteworthy that Jules Boudreau, Herménégilde Chiasson, and Laval Goupil, the first three major Acadian playwrights after Antonine Maillet, are all from the Acadian Peninsula.

TPA also adapted Régis Brun's novel La Mariecomo (1980), the children's theater Rosine et Renixou (1983) by Roseline Blanchard and René Cormier, and the adaptation of Zélica à Cochon Vert (198 Sixth, there is the adaptation of Laurier Melanson's Le Pont rouge, Marcel Thériault's Le Pont rouge, and Bernard Dugas, Bertrand Dugas, and Richard Thériault's Ernest et Étienne ou les bessons un peu plus loin (1988), which is a new version of Jules Boudreau's Les Besons. The Quebec play Le Tourniquet was adapted by Laval Goupil as Le Rouv'cane and presented by TPA in 1988. Other Quebec plays adapted by TPA include Le Rêve de Monsieur Milpiasse (1981) by Claude Saint-Germain, 12 juillet '55 (1986) by Rachel Lepage, and Des yeux au bout des doigts by Louise Painchaud, directed by Brigitte Haentjens. In 1990, the play Le Matin de Francis, written by Louis-Dominique Lavigne, was directed by the author.

The plays by TPA and L'Escaouette received considerable media attention and were more popular than Acadian literature. However, both troupes encountered difficulties in obtaining high-quality Acadian texts. Between 1978 and 1984, 60% of TPA's plays were drawn from the repertoire, with only Jules Boudreau and Laval Goupil's plays being of a comparable standard. Additionally, both companies encountered challenges in securing a second text from an Acadian playwright, despite the prevalence of interest among authors in the field of theatre. This phenomenon offers insight into the rationale behind TPA's reliance on existing repertoire and Théâtre l'Escaouette's predominant reliance on Herménégilde Chiasson.

Other playwrights have made significant contributions to the history of Acadian theatre, including Raymond Leblanc with As-tu vu ma balloune (1979) and Fonds de culottes (1981), Clarence Comeau with Au pays des côtes (1978), and Gérald Leblanc with Les Sentiers de l'espoir (1983). In 1978, the Acadian playwright Gérald Leblanc presented his play Premières neiges d'automne. In 1983, the Acadian playwright Marcel Thériault presented his play J'avais dix ans.

The Théâtre-Acadie Association was established in 1981 to bring together individuals engaged in the field of theater, promoting training and communication, and collecting, preserving, and disseminating information. The association's most significant accomplishment was the establishment of an annual festival that combined training workshops and performances. However, the lack of financial resources and a permanent staff led to the organization's closure in 1988, despite the successful completion of five festival editions.

Antonine Maillet continued her theatrical endeavors, publishing Gapi et Sullivan in 1973, Évangéline Deusse in 1975, La Veuve enragée in 1977, La Contrebandière in 1981, La Joyeuse criée in 1982, Garrochés en paradis in 1986, and Dull Gret in 1987. La Contrebandière and Margot la folle are integral components of the Île-aux-Puces cycle, representing the pinnacle of her artistic output.

In 1986, Viola Léger established the Viola-Léger Company. The following year, the play Harold and Maude, adapted from the American film by Colin Higgins, was performed for an audience of ten thousand. In 1987, La Sagouine was staged by Yvette Brind'Amour, and Le Nez by Robert Bellefeuille and Isabelle Cauchy, based on a tale by the Russian Nikolai Gogol. In 1988, François Barbeau directed Éloize et Étoile, which starred Viola Léger and Angèle Arsenault. In 1989, the troupe produced a new version of La Joyeuse criée by Antonine Maillet, which was directed by François Barbeau and starred Viola Léger and Johnny Comeau. Additionally, the troupe staged a production directed by Marcel Thériault, which featured the comedies Adaptations by Élaine Lemay and Next by Terrence McNally.

=== Revival of amateur theatre ===
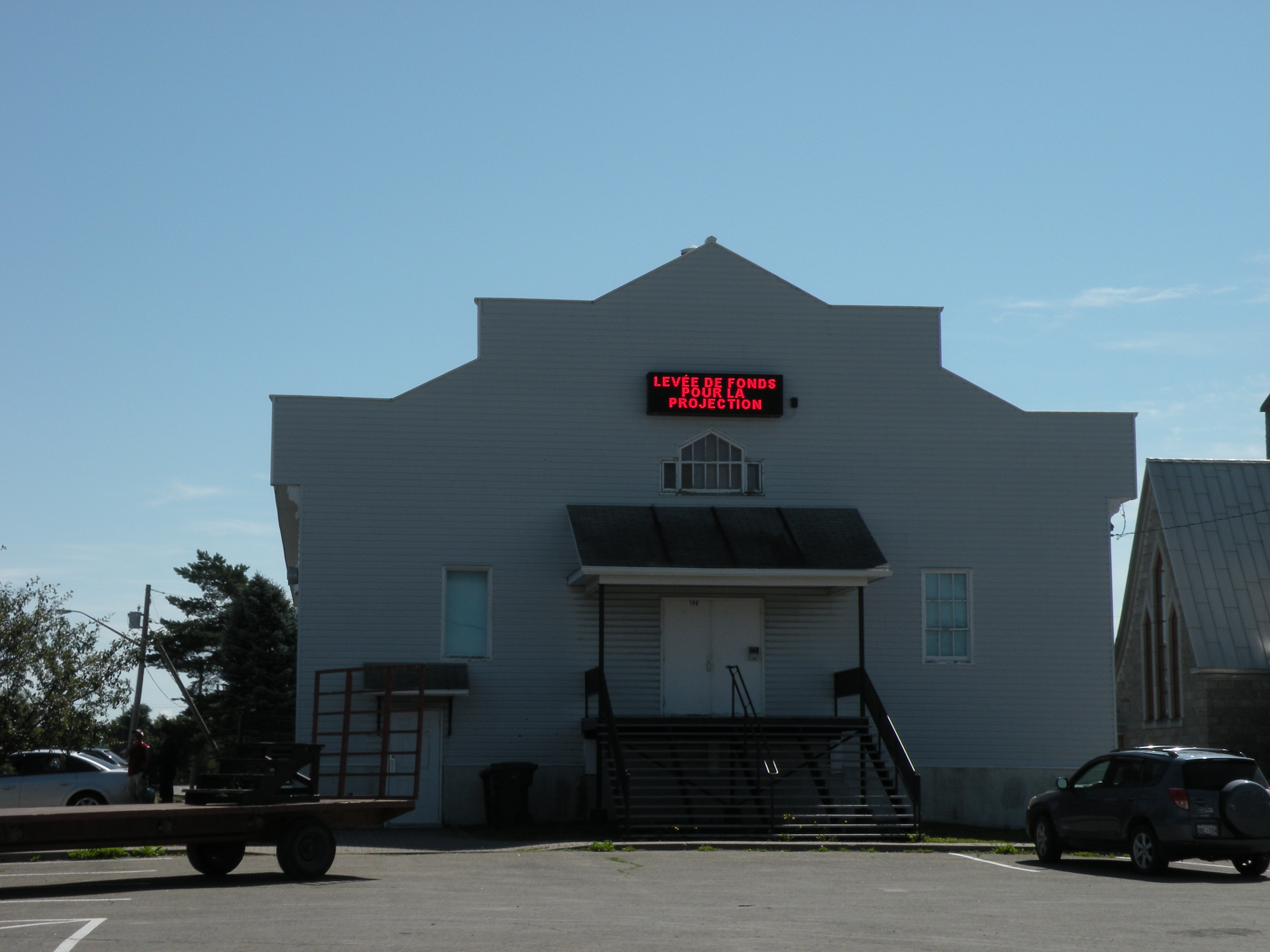
Théâtre Montcalm, Saint-Quentin.

Amateur and community theatre, often parish-based, experienced a resurgence in the mid-1980s, typically in remote locations away from formal theatres. These initiatives were frequently situated within community organizations, guided by dedicated facilitators. The Troupe 2%, based in Caraquet, produced one performance per year, drawing inspiration from reviews, burlesque, vaudeville, Variety shows, imitation, and lip-syncing. Its leaders included Jules Boudreau, Marie-Cécyle Albert, and Linda Lanteigne.

In Mont-Carmel, within the Évangéline region of Prince Edward Island, the dinner-theatre show La Cuisine à Mémé has been presented since 1987. The show features Marie-Anne Roussel in the role of an elderly woman accompanied by musicians and actors. From the same region, the troupe Le Soleil oublié presents one or two shows annually. Other groups, such as Callaghan, Jeunes en Marche from the Évangéline region, and Les Quenoeils de Westisle, present didactic or moralizing performances addressing issues faced by young people. Infrequently, communities organize historical spectacles or liturgical dramas in the medieval tradition. Raymond J. Arsenault and Paul D. Gallant are frequently consulted for the conceptualization of such productions. Gallant, in particular, is renowned for his design of Port Lajoye in 1991. In Nova Scotia, the contributions of Jules Chiasson in Chéticamp have been instrumental in maintaining community theatre. The Les Araignées du Boui-Boui theatre company was established in Pointe-de-l'Église in 1971 by Jean-Douglas Comeau and has been led since 1973 by Normand Godin. By 1993, the company had produced 17 shows, with 14 of these being performed on tour. Their adaptation of Pierre Pathelin and other farces, localized in the regional accent, was awarded first prize at the Nova Scotia Amateur Theatre Festival in 1989, which led to an invitation to the national festival in Victoria, British Columbia. There, they won three awards. The linguistic situation in Acadian communities in Nova Scotia and Prince Edward Island presents a challenge for theatrical production. Paul Gallant, Claude Saint-Germain, and Léonie Poirier have focused their efforts on summer theatre. Pierre Guérin has published plays, including Operation Medusa (1974), which have not yet been staged.

Most high schools present at least one play per year. Some of these productions benefit from collaboration with professionals, including Sylvio Allain in Bouctouche, Lise Cormier in Caraquet, Viola Léger in Dieppe and Shediac, as well as Adrice Richard, also in Dieppe.

=== Crisis in professional theatre ===
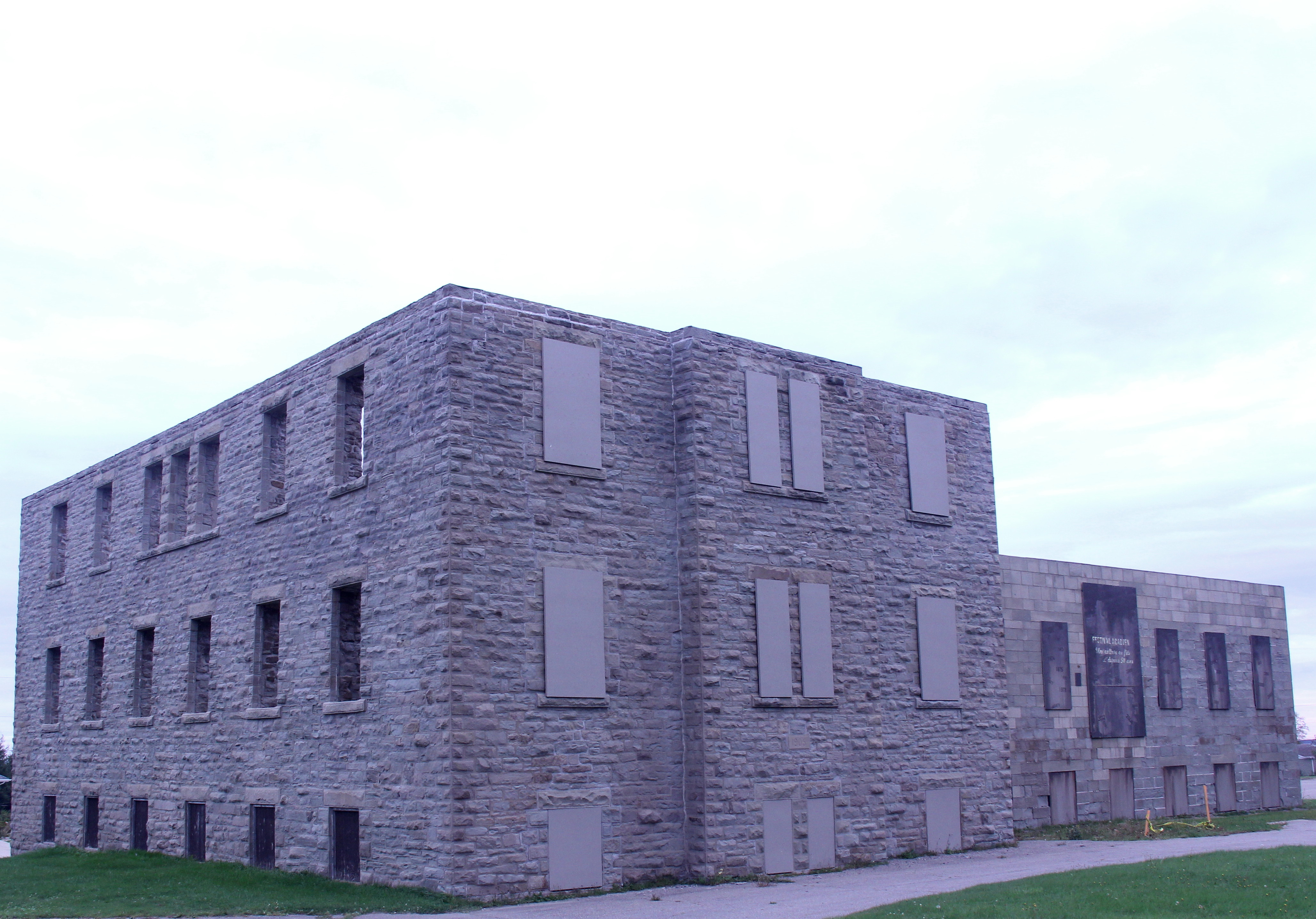
The ruins of the Old convent.

In 1989, the Viola-Léger Company ceased operations, while Théâtre l'Escaouette limited its output to a single production, and Popular Theatre of Acadia cancelled its main production, a play by Molière. Martin Pître observed that "a theatre is dying, our companies no longer perform." Financial constraints and a lack of distinctive identity contributed to the dissolution of the inaugural ensemble, despite the anticipated success of Harold et Maude. Economic challenges similarly affected the other two.

In 1992, Jules Boudreau published Mon théâtre: des techniques et des textes, which featured three of his plays (Note: Agence Beloeil Inc., Mon prince charmant and La Reine Horse.) and staging advice. Following Boudreau, several other plays were staged by TPA, but few achieved success. In 1992, the Old convent was destroyed in a fire, resulting in the loss of all the troupe's archives. In 1993, René Cormier was appointed artistic director, and he initiated a shift in the production focus towards a more accessible repertoire. The troupe continued to experience difficulties in obtaining quality Acadian texts, with Jules Cormier and Bertrand Dugas writing their final plays in 1991 and 1999, respectively.

The Théâtre l'Escaouette shifted its focus to youth productions, with Herménégilde Chiasson creating nine of the thirteen pieces for the troupe. Alongside Roger Leblanc, he created the character Princess Mine de Rien, a "minority" combating the giant Anglobant in two plays, Mine de Rien (1980) and L'Étoile de Mine de Rien (1982), which can be considered political fables. In 1982, he addressed Henry Longfellow in Évangéline, mythe ou réalité. His most accomplished children's play is Atarelle et les Pacmaniens (1983), in which Atarelle, detached from traditional heroes, explores the world of video games but ultimately prefers the real world. The play was presented in other Canadian and European venues through an exchange with Belgium's Théâtre de la Guimbarde. In 1990, Pierre, Hélène et Michaël examined the themes of exile and the appeal of Anglophone culture. The theme of suicide is a central concern in Cap Enragé (1992). He also wrote Le Manège des Anges (1992). Additionally, Théâtre l'Escaouette produced several other notable works, including Marie Pauline's Le Pêcheur Ensorcelé (1979), Gracia Couturier's Le Gros Ti-Gars (1985), and Christiane Saint-Pierre's Mon cœur a mal aux dents (1991). Notable works include Christiane Saint-Pierre's Le Marchand de Mémoire (1992) and Jean-Philippe Raîche's Le Marchand de Mémoire (1992). Additionally, Jean Péronnet's Pépère Goguen, Gardien de Phare (1996) is a noteworthy puppet show.

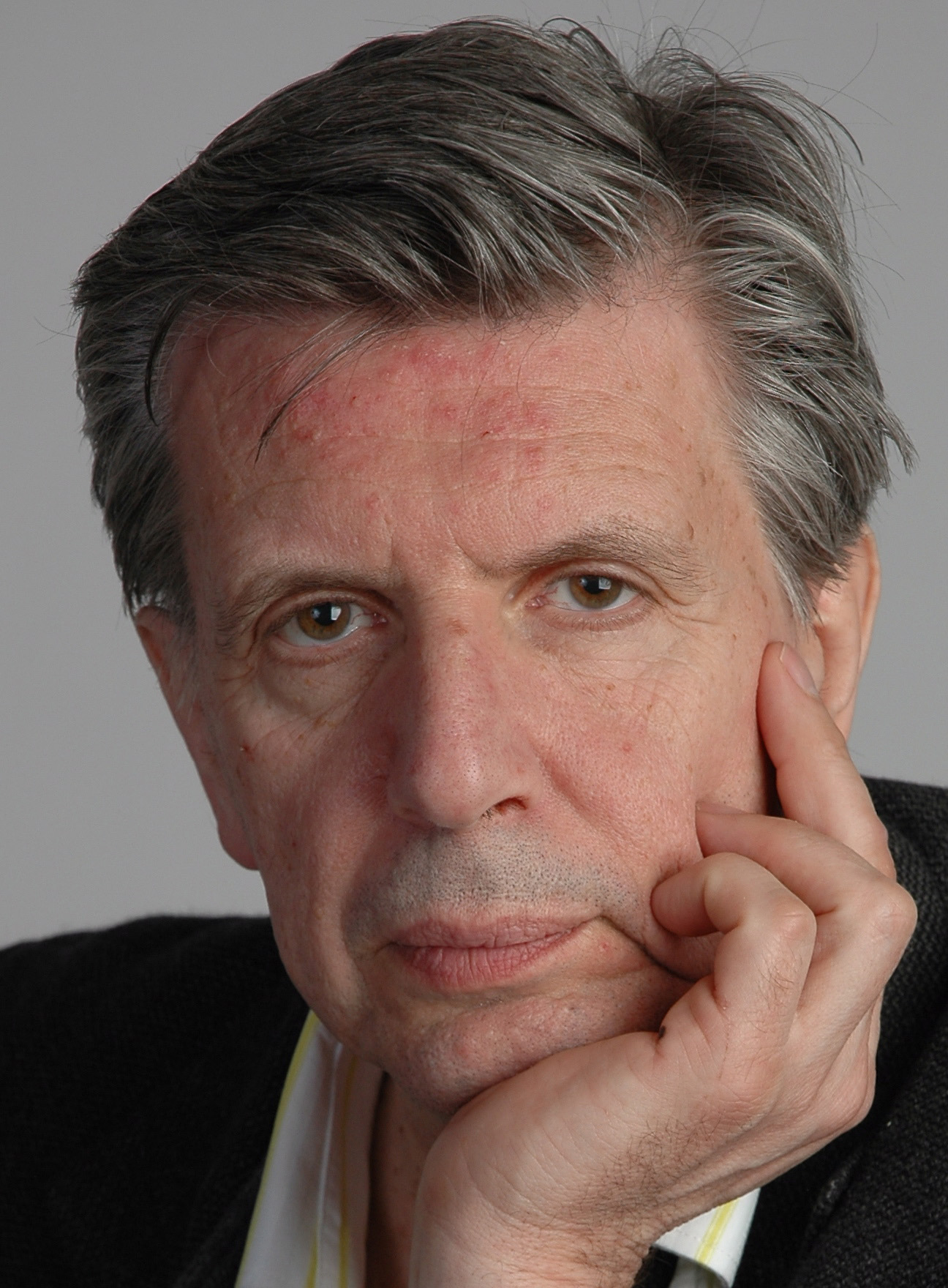

Additionally, TPA produced children's plays in the late 1980s, including Le Roi Triste (1992) and La Chaise Perdue (1995), which were co-written by Luc Leblanc and Quebec's Louis-Dominique Lavigne. In 2004, TPA also produced La Petite ombre, a collective work.

The Théâtre l'Escaouette did indeed stage some adult shows during the 1980s, including Pique-nique (1987) by Rino Morin Rossignol. However, the majority of the summer theatre productions were not particularly successful. It was not until 1993 that the troupe began to prioritize adult theater, even ceasing production of children's plays after Pépère Goguen in 1996 to focus on plays for adolescents. Subsequent plays were written by Herménégilde Chiasson, including L'Exil d'Alexa (1993), La Vie est un Rêve (1994), and Aliénor (1996), which collectively form a dramatic trilogy on identity issues. Chiasson approached the subject from a humorous perspective with Pour une Fois (1999). Laurie ou la Vie de Galerie (1997) functions as a comedic and satirical interlude.

Subsequently, other playwrights emerged, among them Gracia Couturier, who exhibited considerable expertise in the manipulation of textual material and the construction of dramatic narratives, as evidenced by her four plays presented at the Théâtre de Saisons de Shippagan.

The company Les Productions Océan was established in 1989 by artists who were unable to find an outlet for their creativity within existing companies. Their sole production was Herménégilde Chiasson's play Ed(d)ie, which represents a rare example of metatheatre in the Acadian repertoire. Another company, Les Productions Tréteau, was established in Caraquet in 1991 for similar reasons. Their one-woman show, Bachelor, performed by Claire Normand and directed by Daniel Castonguay, was also staged in Moncton. Subsequently, the troupe organized several cabaret shows in northeastern New Brunswick, focusing on mystery, enigma, and the unusual. In addition, several other protest-driven troupes were established in previous years, often with a limited lifespan. La Gang Asteur staged Tchissé qui mène icitte by Raymond Leblanc, while Les Productions Fait Dodo produced Première Neige d'Automne by Clarence Comeau.

Antonine Maillet wrote several plays inspired by great classics, including William S. (1991), La Nuit des rois de William Shakespeare (1993), and La Foire de la Saint-Barthélemy (1994). However, La Fontaine ou la comédie des animaux (1995) did not achieve the anticipated success. In 1996, she published a collection of monologues from Pays de la Sagouine and L'Île-aux-Puces, which, according to David Lonergan, suffered a significant loss of impact when transferred from an oral to a written format.

=== Renewal in the 2000s ===
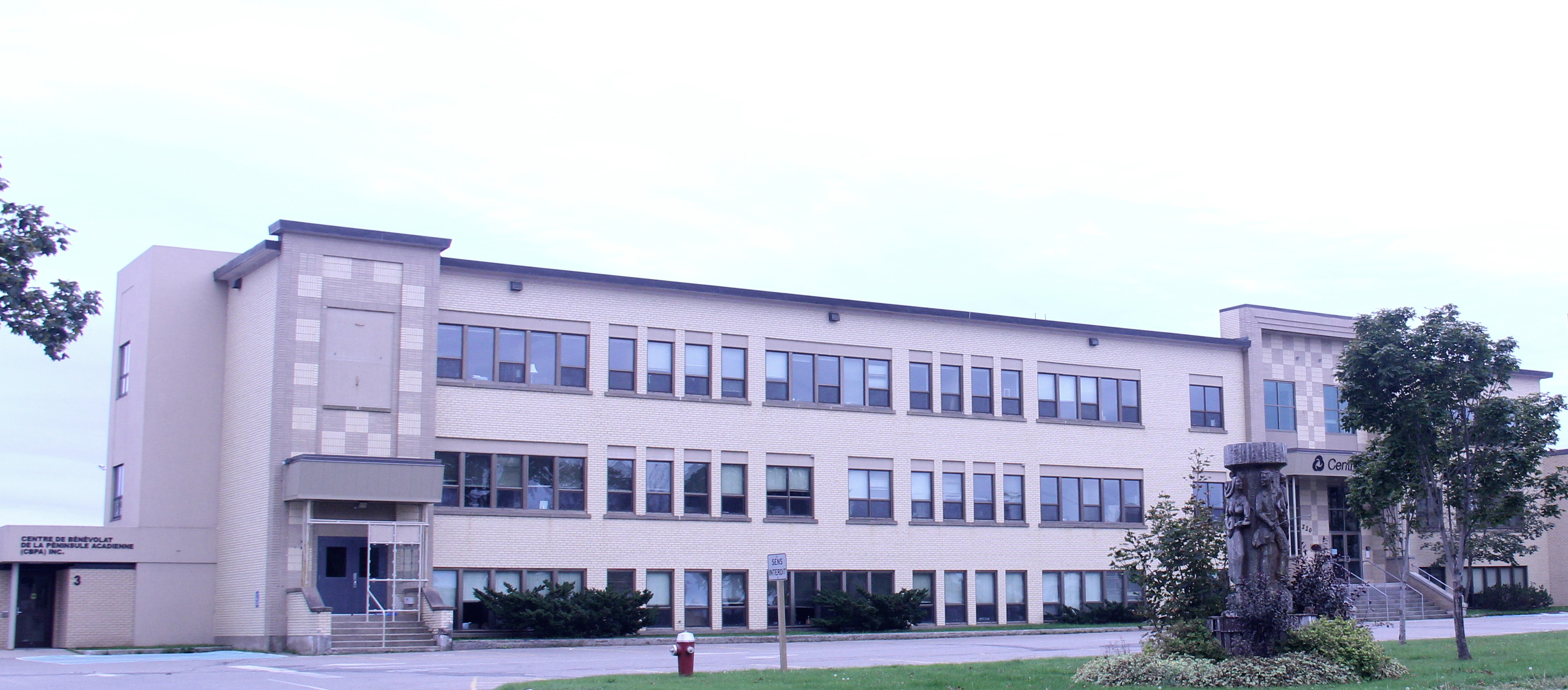
Cultural Center in Caraquet, home to the main concert hall and the TPA.

The collective Moncton Sable was established in 1996, employing a methodology that was more structured than textual, which resonated with a modest but devoted following. This approach enabled the ensemble to surmount the paucity of Acadian literary works. The collective staged works by novelist France Daigle. The plays Sable (1997), Craie (1999), and Foin (2000) examine the relationship between material and human. Other plays were produced, including Bric-à-Brac (2001) and Sans jamais parler du vent (2003). Three plays by Paul Bossé were also mounted, including Pellicule (2009), which blends cinema and theatre through themes and image projection.

The repertoire of TPA productions included Évangéline Deusse in 1997, Quebec plays such as Le Temps d'une Vie by Roland Lepage in 1984, and foreign plays such as The Chairs by Eugène Ionesco in 1992, L'Indifférent by Goldoni in 2000, and Trois Farces by Chekhov in 2010. The absence of Acadian texts continued to present a challenge at TPA.

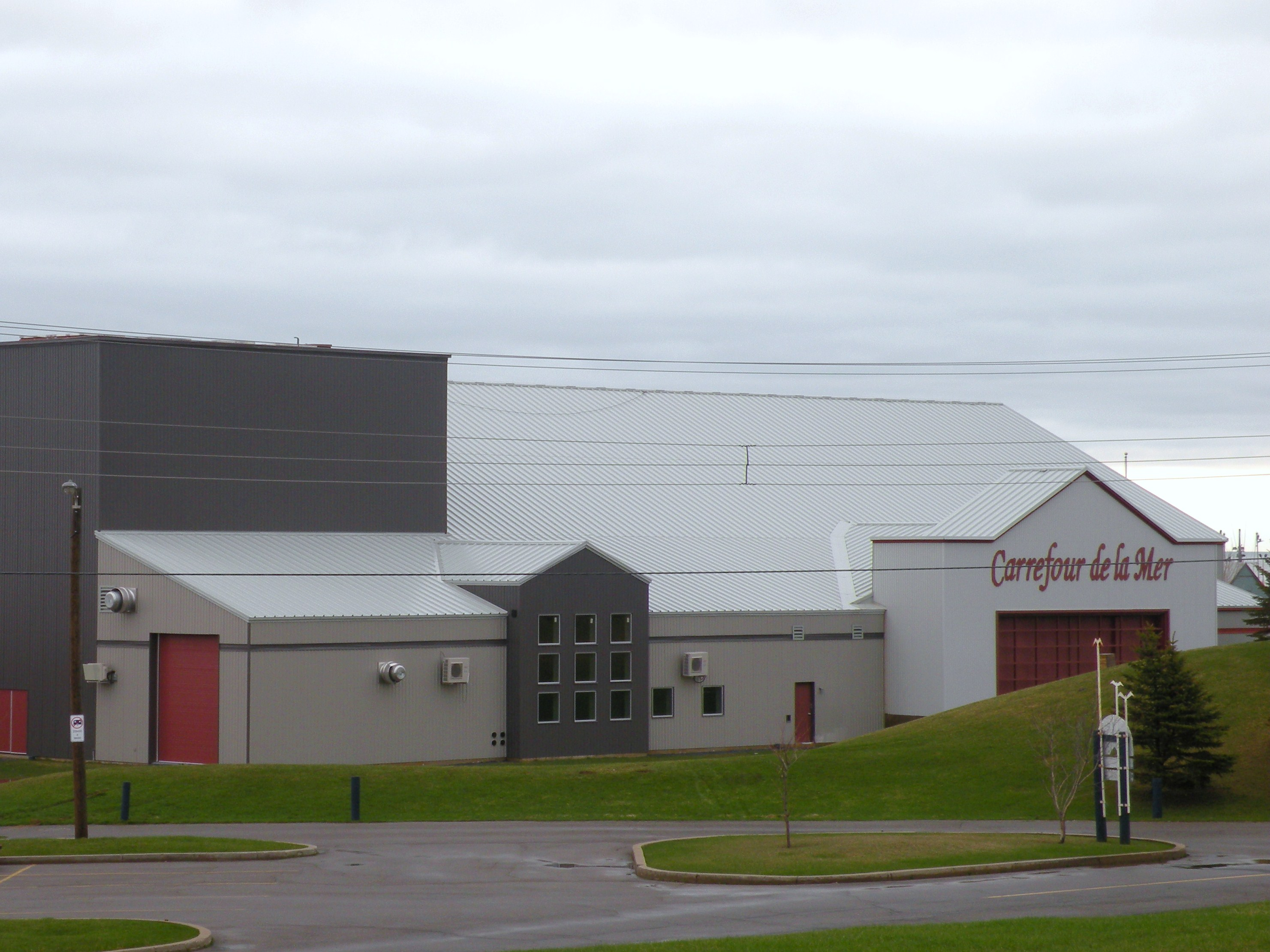
Carrefour de la Mer, in Caraquet, used for large-scale productions such as Louis Mailloux.

However, a new generation of playwrights revitalized TPA, including Emma Haché with Les Défricheurs d'Eau in 2004 and Murmures in 2005. She had already distinguished herself at Théâtre Omnibus in Montreal with L'Intimé, earning her the Governor General's Award in 2004. She is, in fact, the most prolific contemporary dramatist. In addition, Marcel-Romain Thériault attracted attention with the social drama Le Filet in 2007 and the romantic comedy Disponible en librairie the following year. In 2006, Maurice Arsenault assumed the role of artistic director at TPA. In 2008, a new 280-seat hall and offices were established in the cultural center of Caraquet, replacing the troupe's previous housing in various buildings since 1992. However, the hall was not yet profitable, so the troupe hosted other companies. They continued touring, which proved advantageous given that Caraquet had a population of less than 5,000.

During the 2000s, Herménégilde Chiasson remained the primary playwright at Théâtre l'Escaouette. In 2002, he collaborated with Louis-Dominique Lavigne of Quebec on the play Le Cœur de la Tempête, which was written for adolescents. Additionally, he authored the drama Le Christ est Apparu au Gun Club (2003), the satirical comedy La Grande Séance (2004), and the social drama comedy Des Nouvelles de Copenhague (2008). The Festival à Haute Voix facilitated the recruitment of new playwrights, including Jean Babineau and Mélanie F. Léger. In 2010, the latter author wrote Je… Adieu in collaboration with Acadian author and actor André Roy for Vie d’Cheval in 2008. Jean Babineau created Tangentes in 2007.

Other theatre companies were established in the 2000s by graduates of the Université de Moncton. Théâtre Alacenne presented imaginative plays by co-director Mélanie F. Léger, including Roger, Roger (2005). Les Productions l'Entrepôt developed populist theatre with Plus que Parfait (2010) by Robert Gauvin and André Roy.

== Personalities ==
=== Playwrights and directors ===
The quality of Acadian dramaturgy has demonstrably improved since the 1970s, with contemporary infrastructure likely providing a stimulus for authors.

The work of Antonine Maillet (born in Bouctouche in 1929) is of great significance in Acadian culture, whether in literature —she was awarded the Prix Goncourt in 1979 for her novel Pélagie-la-Charrette— or theatre. She is often compared to Gratien Gélinas or Michel Tremblay for Quebec theatre. She revitalized Acadian dramatic literature, as did the first, staging characters from the region who spoke like the people, as did the second. According to Zénon-Chiasson, Maillet succeeded in creating a national dramatic tradition with La Sagouine, overcoming three centuries of uncertainty.

Born in Saint-Simon in 1946, Herménégilde Chiasson is the most prolific playwright after Antonine Maillet. His plays, which are sometimes serious and sometimes humorous, explore three themes: the fantastic, imaginary worlds, and wonders in Becquer Bobo (1976), Mine de Rien, L'Étoile de Mine de Rien (1982) —written in collaboration with Roger LeBlanc— and Atarelle et les Pacmaniens. In Histoire en histoire (1980) and Renaissances (1984), he employed a revisionist historical perspective. In Au plus fort la poche (1977), Cogne Fou (1981), and Y'a pas que des maringouins dans les campings (1986), he explored the genres of farce and humor. He wrote relatively little for teenagers, an audience likely to be more challenging to reach with theatre. However, he was successful with Pierre, Hélène et Michaël (1990). The majority of his plays are produced by Théâtre l'Escaouette, but TPA also produced L'Amer à boire in 1977, while the Université de Moncton produced Au plus fort la poche and Becquer Bobo. In 1985, Atarelle et les Pacmaniens embarked on a European tour.

Jules Boudreau, originally from Maisonnette, was an active participant in the theatrical activities of the Caraquet region from the 1970s onwards. He was particularly involved with Troupe 2% and Popular Theatre of Acadia. He also founded Les Élouèzes and Théâtre de la Dune in his hometown. However, he is primarily known as a playwright, and most of his plays have been professionally staged by TPA. His most celebrated work is the large-scale musical drama Louis Mailloux, created with Calixte Duguay, in which he acknowledges the necessity of modifying historical reality to align with the contemporary context and present the struggle of the oppressed against the oppressor as a symbol of Acadian resistance. With the musical comedy La Lambique (1983), the Boudreau/Duguay duo departs from the conventional treatment of Acadian nationalism by employing humor as a means of approaching the subject matter. Cochu et le soleil (1977) is a play about the misery and humiliation endured by the Acadians after the Deportation. He then wrote Images de notre enfance, which focuses on various aspects of children's lives in the 1950s. Des amis pas pareils, a fable written in collaboration with Jeanine Boudreau-Dugas, explores differences by touching on both reality and imagination. He collaborated with Bernard and Bertrand Dugas on Bessons, a text that examines the relationships between twins and their external environment. Additionally, Jules Boudreau wrote three radio scripts.

Laval Goupil (1945–2000) was born in Tracadie-Sheila, the third great playwright to emerge from the Acadian Peninsula. However, he spent several years in Montreal, where he undertook extensive studies in dramatic arts. He later became known primarily as an animator, director, performer, and writer. Two of his plays, Le Djibou and Tête d'eau, were published in Acadia and became a success in Quebec. Three additional plays, Le Roi appelle, Mission collision, and Ti-Jean, were produced but remain unpublished. He adapted Victor Lanoux's Le Tourniquet into Le Rouv'cane and Claude Le Bouthillier's L'Acadien reprend son pays into Jour de grâce. Additionally, he wrote three radio scripts, with only one, Exil, airing in 1979 on Première Chaîne. This script explores national unity in a science fiction context.

A second group of playwrights hails from Madawaska, situated in the northwestern region of New Brunswick. Gracia Couturier, born in 1951 in Edmundston, established the Théâtre de saison at the Université de Shippagan. She has authored four plays for this theater, and her other plays have been staged by Théâtre l'Escaouette, except one, which was produced at the Université de Moncton. One of her concerns is conditions of women, yet she questions the roles of genders with humor rather than dogma in Mon mari est un ange and Les Ans volés. Her experience in writing educational notebooks for theatrical tours in schools enables her to address her other concern, children, with a combination of humor and delicacy. This is evident in her works, such as Les Enfants taisez vous!, and Le Gros ti-gars, which tackle the subject of abuse of power, and Enfantômes Suroulettes, which explores illness, suffering, and death.

Charles Pelletier collaborated with his professor, Gilles Claude Thériault, co-founded Théâtre nouveau with Lucie Albert, and later became a theater teacher. He authored five plays, one of which, Dame Bulle, was staged by him at Théâtre l'Escaouette in 1987.

Rino Morin Rossignol (born 1950) is most widely recognized as a journalist, poet, and essayist. He has written only one play, Le Pique-nique, which was first produced in Edmundston in 1987 and directed by Eugène Gallant at Théâtre l'Escaouette. The play employs the comparison of regional differences in Acadia as a pretext to explore the playful functions of language.

Laurier Melanson, born in southeastern New Brunswick, a region where Antonine Maillet was born and raised, wrote only one play, Zélika à cochon vert, an adaptation of his novel. This play was first staged at TPA by Marcel Thériault and subsequently became the subject of a radio series. Melanson himself wrote five radio scripts, all produced by Bertholet Charron.

Roger Leblanc was the inaugural artistic director of Théâtre l'Escaouette, where he wrote or contributed to five plays, four of which were produced by the institution. After seven years, Leblanc departed from the theater, although it is unclear whether he continued to engage in theatrical activities. A publication from Théâtre l'Escaouette asserts that he "formed an audience and a repertoire" and "dusted off [the Acadians] from a folkloric vision," embracing modernity according to Zénon-Chiasson.

The same could be said of the Belgian Ivan Vanhecke (1948–2011), who was involved in the theatre from his arrival in 1976. He performed as a teacher, playwright, director, and actor. He staged several shows at Théâtre l'Escaouette, adapting Le Tapis de Grand-Pré in 1989 and writing Promenade en haute mer the same year. Première Chaîne produced two of his texts, including L'Errance de la baleine, which was awarded the Des mots et des sons contest in 1990.

=== Actors ===
Viola Léger (born 1930 in Fitchburg, Massachusetts) is the singular interpreter of Antonine Maillet's La Sagouine. With her hoarse voice, chiseled features, gestures, gait, and accent, she embodies the notion of an actress who meets a great role or rather a role that meets a great actress, as posited by Zénon-Chiasson. Léger performed the role on over 2,000 occasions, while also assuming the role of an actress in other plays by Antonine Maillet.

Bernard Leblanc (1944–2007) initially trained as an actor through self-study at the Théâtre amateur de Moncton, where he performed in the play Ti-Jean. He co-founded Théâtre l'Escaouette, appearing in Histoire en histoire (1980), Cogne fou (1981), Renaissances (1984), and Y'a pas que des maringouins dans les campings (1986). He was Viola Léger's husband and was the first to play the role of Gapi, La Sagouine's husband, at Pays de la Sagouine. Additionally, they were depicted as a couple in the 1994 film Jerome's Secret. One of his most notable performances was as Barnie in the play Aléola, adapted by Laval Goupil from a play by Gaétan Charlebois. However, his most significant role was in the play Laurie ou la vie de galerie (1997), written specifically for him by Herménégilde Chiasson.

Florian Levesque (1959–2012) was a storyteller, writer, and activist born in Val-d'Amours, northern New Brunswick. He created the characters Monsieur Flo and Lévêk for children and adults, respectively, and presented his shows in Canada, the United States, and Europe.

== Genres and themes ==
=== Great Upheaval ===
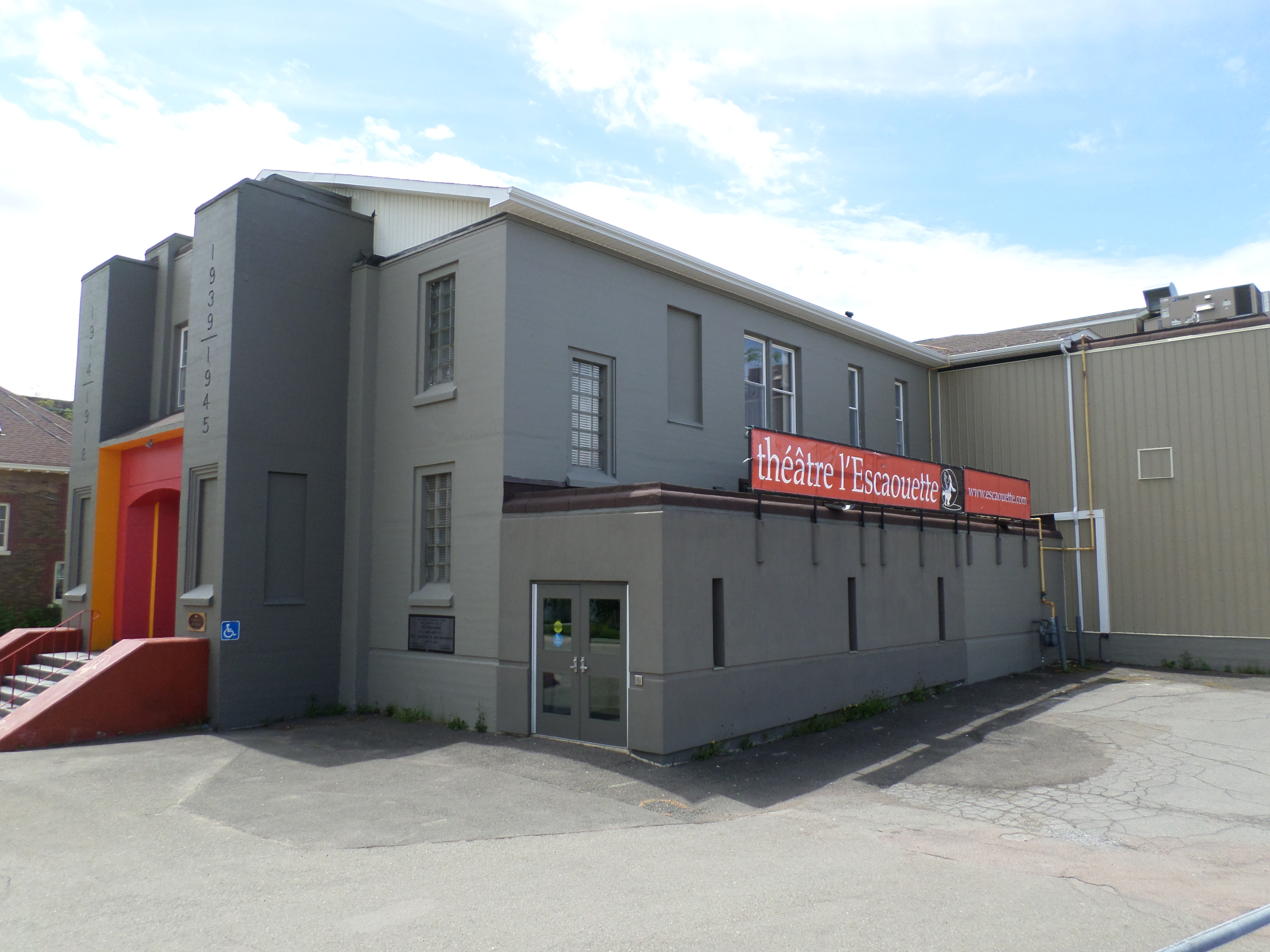
Théâtre l'Escaouette.

Many college theater pieces address the Great Upheaval and, more specifically, the deportation of the Acadians. This is because educators use the theater to instill a national sentiment among students. Traditionally, these plays depict the martyrdom of innocents. The primary work, and the only one published, is Jean-Baptiste Jégo's Le Drame du peuple acadien, produced in 1930 at Sainte-Anne College.

The bicentenary of the Deportation of the Acadians in 1955 was the occasion for several celebrations, as well as the creation of theatrical pieces on this theme. However, this event marked the end of a pastist ideology that was, in fact, the facade of a clerico-nationalist movement. In other words, young artists eschewed the subject of the deportation of the Acadians, deeming it detrimental to retreat into the past while Acadia was undergoing a period of experimentation and liberation. They also denounced the survival ideology espoused during the Acadian National Conventions and challenged the legitimacy of national symbols, which they perceived as synonymous with inferior, colonized people. At the 13th Acadian National Convention in 1960, Louis Lebel advocated for collective amnesia regarding these events.

In the 1960s and 1970s, authors opposed the prevailing image of historical Acadia, preferring to focus on the potential for Acadia to be made anew. Nevertheless, Antonine Maillet's international success in 1979 with her novel Pélagie-la-Charrette contributed to the popularization of this theme. The novel narrates the return of the deportees to Acadia. In 1977, Jules Boudreau published Cochu et le soleil, which deals with the "second deportation of the Acadians" from the Saint John River valley upon the arrival of the Loyalists in 1783. With the tale Le Tapis de Grand-Pré, Réjean Aucoin and Jean-Charles Tremblay succeeded in establishing a connection between the various Acadian communities in Nova Scotia, providing an opportunity for younger generations to gain insight into their heritage, and fostering a sense of Acadian identity. This work was adapted for the stage in 1989 by Ivan Vanhecke.

=== Current events ===
It is a relatively uncommon occurrence for theatrical productions to represent current events. Qu'est-ce qu'on fait, monsieur le maire? (1973) is an adaptation of Françoise Loranger's play Médium saignant (1969), featuring Mayor Leonard Jones of Moncton, who is known for his francophobia. The expropriation of Kouchibouguac National Park is nevertheless addressed in the children's play Kouchibou quoi? (1975) by Roger Leblanc. In Cochu et le soleil (1977), Jules Boudreau establishes a correlation between the deportation of the Acadians and this event, with the character Grégoire Cochu evoking Jackie Vautour, to whom the play is dedicated. One of the few other plays on current events is Marcel-Romain Thériault's Le Filet (2007), inspired by the 2003 crab crisis. Despite facing threats from those opposed to the play's content, the production was a success.

The troupe La Revue acadienne presents a comedic retrospective of the year at the HubCap festival in Moncton, commencing with events from 2001 and continuing with their performances from 2003 onwards. A television series was even produced by Radio-Canada in 2011.

=== Acadianness and nationalism ===
The use of the English language during select parish theater performances has been the subject of criticism, occasionally resulting in impassioned discourse, as evidenced by the pages of 'L'Évangéline' in 1913. Currently, employing Acadian French is sometimes rejected outright or, at the very least, no longer a clear indication of Acadian identity.

The Acadian theater is often confused with Quebec theater, as are other aspects of Acadian culture. Antonine Maillet and Théâtre de Neptune are examples of appropriation, which sometimes sparks controversy but can be explained by mutual influence. However, most of Antonine Maillet's plays were staged and performed by Quebecers, while numerous Quebec plays were adapted in Acadia. Frequent coproductions with Quebec sometimes attract criticism. Nevertheless, they reach a wider audience, as evidenced by the 150 performances of Grace et Gloria in 2023. Furthermore, coproductions facilitate the receipt of Quebec awards for Acadian plays, as evidenced by the numerous Masques received by TPA over the years. This situation prompts Jean-Claude Marcus to distinguish between "Acadian theater" and "theater in Acadia."

The Popular Theatre of Acadia has frequently been the subject of criticism for failing to produce a sufficient quantity of Acadian texts. Zénon-Chiasson has argued that this remains a necessity, given the limited repertoire, the lack of playwrights, and the primary mission of the troupe to offer high-quality theatre.

The Acadian theater has frequently centered on Acadia, according to Zénon-Chiasson, falling into clichés and frequently using various Acadian symbols like the national flag, typical dishes, and fishing gear. However, this has helped develop an authentic theater that is not "colonized." Antonine Maillet's works, notably La Sagouine, with their vernacular language and portrayal of the poor and marginalized, have contributed to shaping Acadian identity through theater. Historical plays are often employed for this purpose, although the events depicted are often distorted, generally to update the fight for social justice and freedoms. It is not so much the events that are transformed but the way they are represented, often using satire. Michel Roy critiques this practice in his 1978 essay L'Acadie perdue. Themes about history and the debate surrounding identity have become less prominent in contemporary Acadian theatre. However, Herménégilde Chiasson's Pierre, Hélène et Michael (1990) addresses the subject of exile and the allure of Anglophone culture. In Jules and Jeannine Boudreau's play Des amis pas pareils, animals lose their tails and, consequently, their identity, which can be seen as a metaphor for the assimilation of Acadians. From the 1980s, social concerns common to other peoples began to be represented in Acadian theatre. There is a tendency to avoid using purely Acadian subjects and to adopt more universal themes. Even the words Acadie and Acadian are sometimes set aside.

Nevertheless, the Acadian theater is not exclusively focused on Acadia and its inhabitants. A notable illustration of this is Antonine Maillet's works, particularly Évangéline Deusse, which is set in a Montreal park.

== Festivals ==
Several festivals are dedicated to Acadian theatre. In 1998, Théâtre L'Escaouette initiated an animation component, which subsequently became the biennial Festival à haute voix (FHV) in 2001. This event consists of readings of unpublished texts, allowing authors to collaborate with actors and a director and animator, notably Louis-Dominique Lavigne. A considerable number of the plays presented at the Festival à haute voix are subsequently produced by TPA, L'Escaouette, or other theatrical ensembles. The festival served as a springboard for the careers of Emma Haché, Marcel-Romain Thériault, and Mélanie F. Léger.

The Festival du Théâtre Jeunesse en Acadie was established by the Popular Theatre of Acadia in 1998, offering both repertoire plays and new creations. There is also the Festival de Théâtre Communautaire en Acadie. Other events highlight theater, including various Acadian festivals such as those in Caraquet, FrancoFête en Acadie, and the Acadian World Congress, held every four years.

The first edition of TPA's Estival took place in 2007.

== Around theater ==
=== Funding and promotion ===
Some theatrical companies engage in the distribution of lottery tickets, including Popular Theatre of Acadia, which offers Loto TPA.

The Association des théâtres francophones du Canada (ATFC), established in 1984, fulfills a comparable function to that of the Association Théâtre-Acadie from 1981 to 1988 at the local level.

From the organization of the inaugural public sessions in Memramcook, the local press, particularly Le Moniteur Acadien, has consistently highlighted performances, referenced the participation of notable figures, and promoted these events.

In 1888, chartered trains transported spectators to Memramcook. The same was done for Sacred Heart College, with a special train even making the trip to Bathurst for the 1905 Christmas performance.

=== Censorship ===
David Lonergan asserts that the political correctness practiced by the New Brunswick government at times approaches the level of "imbecility."

In the context of a wave of teenage suicides, Herménégilde Chiasson's play Cap Enragée was censored by L'Escaouette's artistic director during its 1999 revival. This involved the transformation of suicides into accidents.

=== Criticism and research ===
The Acadian artistic milieu was long too small to allow the necessary distance for objectivity and rigorous dramatic criticism. Originally, journalists merely reported on events —a term considered more accurate than criticism by Jean-Claude Marcus, who often stated that a given session "was the most beautiful [...] ever given," making it difficult to judge the true quality of the plays produced. In many cases, historians have only press releases issued by theater companies. However, there are examples of more nuanced opinions; for instance, in 1941, Clément Cormier mentioned that during the presentation of The Imaginary Invalid, modern jackets of students sometimes appeared under their characters' robes.

At the turn of the 21st century, criticism was almost nonexistent due to a lack of means and platforms to publish critiques that could themselves be subject to criticism, a lack of references to judge the quality of a play, and, above all, the fact that the milieu was not accustomed to supporting negative criticism without it being perceived as ill-intentioned.

The paucity of published plays and the rarity of their performance outside of Acadia render their study challenging. However, the works of Jean-Claude Marcus, Laurent Lavoie, Roger Lacerte, and Zénon-Chiasson have partially documented the history of Acadian theater. Other texts by Judith Perron, Jean Marmier, and Alex Fancy provide a more comprehensive understanding of certain aspects of this discipline.

=== Distribution ===
In 1990, the number of published Acadian plays was limited to eight, even though over sixty had been produced between the 1960s and 1993. One contributing factor to this scarcity of published texts is the disinterest of some playwrights, who prefer to see their plays performed on stage. All of Antonine Maillet's plays were published by Leméac in Montreal, (Note: Les Crasseux was first published by Holt, Rinehart & Winston in 1968 before appearing at Leméac in 1973. La Sagouine, written in 1971, was also published by Éditions Grasset & Fasquelle in 1976.) a city outside the Acadian cultural sphere. Éditions d'Acadie and Michel Henry éditeur, which no longer exists, shared the remaining titles. Éditions Perce-Neige also published a play. Vincent Dumas, a playwright, self-published his work, while Imprimeries Évangéline of Yarmouth published texts by Germaine Comeau, among others.

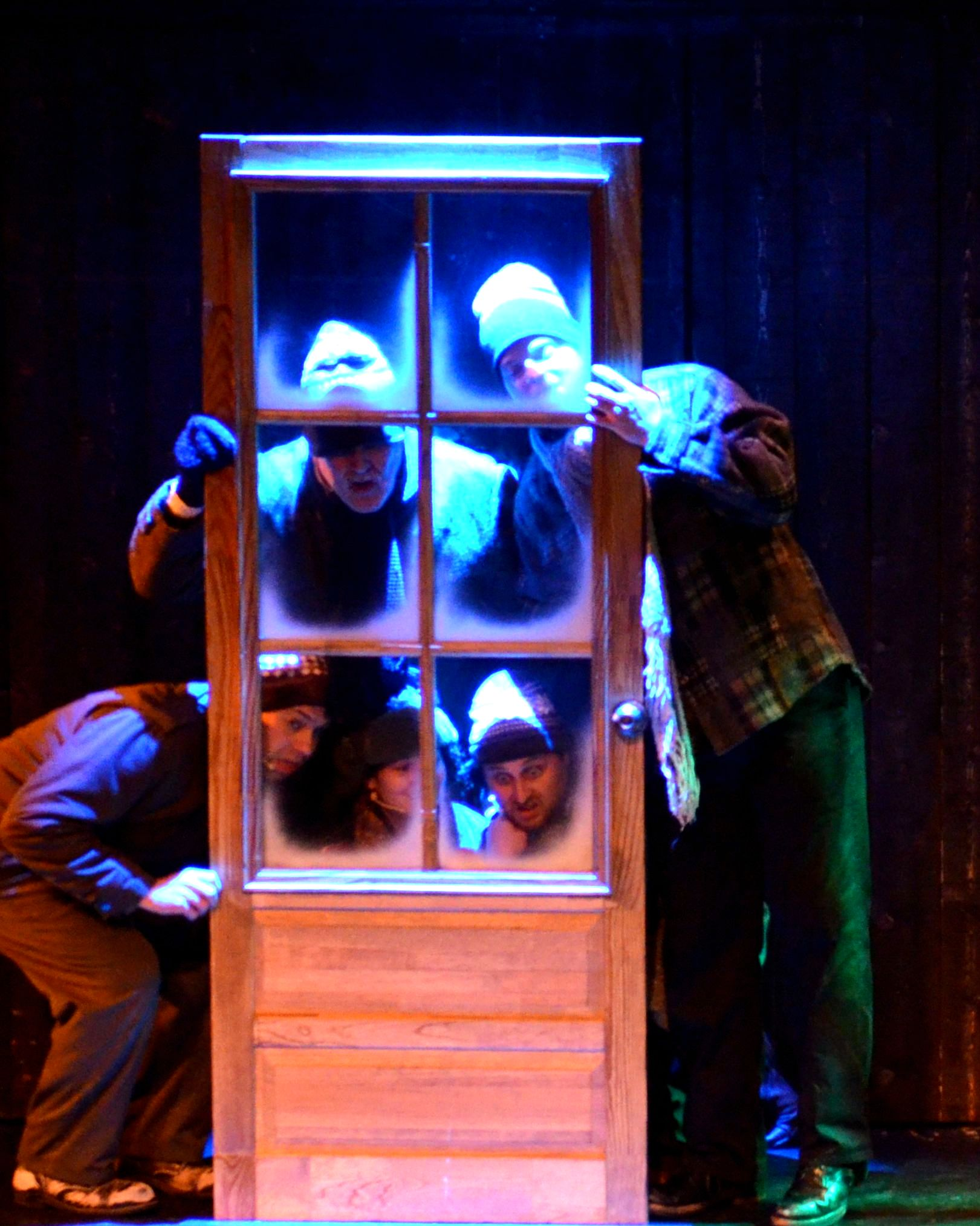
A Christmas show in Le Pays de la Sagouine.

The publishing landscape underwent a notable transformation after 1990, with a total of 24 plays being released over 13 years. Notably, Pascal Poirier's Les Acadiens à Philadelphie (1875) was first published in 1994, marking a significant milestone in the history of Acadian literature.

The Société Radio-Canada contributes to the dissemination of Acadian theater through its CBAFT-DT television station and especially its CBAF-FM radio station (Première Chaîne). CBAFT-DT produced a television film by Jacques Savoie and two series based on La Sagouine, but only one true tele-theater, Mon mari est un ange (1988) by Gracia Couturier, which had been staged a year earlier in Edmundston. In a staging by the author, the main character, psychology professor Tarzan Mâzzerolle, played by Philippe Beaulieu, has a temporary bout of feminism and decides to shoulder his wife's pregnancy so that she can pursue her career. Bertholet Charron directed most of CBAF-FM's radio dramas. Several young authors began their careers there, including Laurier Melanson, who read the texts of Zélica à Cochon vert and Otto de le veuve Hortense. The society also organized an annual contest, the winner of which saw their work produced by the organization.

=== Translations ===
The inaugural translated play, written by the Italian playwright Dario Fo, was presented by Popular Theatre of Acadia in 1983. Since that time, the majority of translations have been undertaken by TPA, with Théâtre L'Escaouette preferring to create original works. A total of nineteen plays were translated at the theatre until 2004, with only two of these translations being created by Acadians. The first of these was the work of Laval Goupil in 1997 for Gaëtan Charlebois's play Aléola. Between 2000 and 2005, the troupe exclusively employed translators based in Europe before reverting to Quebec-based translators.

== Influence ==
The success of La Sagouine led to a television series produced by Radio-Canada Television in 1977. In 1992, Le Pays de la Sagouine was founded in Bouctouche, based on Antonine Maillet's characters. The writer continues to write texts staged annually in this recreational tourism complex. A new television series was created in 2006 in this setting by Phil Comeau.

== Bibliography ==
=== Specialized works ===
- Chiasson, Zénon (1992). "Fragments d'identité du/dans le théâtre acadien contemporain (1960–1991)". Études en littérature canadienne (in French). 17 (2). Archived from the original on February 22, 2014.
- Chiasson, Zénon (1993a). "L'institution théâtrale acadienne". L'Acadie des Maritimes (in French). Moncton: Anselme-Chiasson Acadian Studies Center. pp. 789–844. ISBN 2921166062.
- Chiasson, Zénon (1993). Répertoire chronologique des productions théâtrales en Acadie: 1973-1993 (in French). Moncton: Université de Moncton.
- Laurette, Patrick Condom (1993). "Aspects historique de l'art en Acadie". L'Acadie des Maritimes (in French). Moncton: Centre d'études acadiennes, Université de Moncton. pp. 789–844. ISBN 2921166062.
- Lavoie, Laurent (1986). "Petite histoire du théâtre acadien". Langues et littératures au Nouveau-Brunswick (in French). Moncton: Éditions d'Acadie. pp. 231–258. ISBN 978-2760001299.
- Lonergan, David (2000). La création à coeur: l'histoire du théâtre l'Escaouette (in French). Tracadie-Sheila: Éditions La Grande Marée. ISBN 2-921722-26-7.
- Lonergan, David (2001). "L'émergence du théâtre professionnel en Acadie: le Théâtre populaire d'Acadie et le théâtre l'Escaouette". Les théâtres professionnels du Canada francophone, entre mémoire et rupture (in French). Ottawa: Le Nordir. pp. 27–47. ISBN 2-89531-013-0.
- Lonergan, David (2008). Tintamarre: chroniques de littérature dans l'Acadie d'aujourd'hui (in French). Sudbury: Prise de parole. ISBN 978-2-89423-212-5.
- Lonergan, David (2010). Paroles d'Acadie: Anthologie de la littérature acadienne (1958-2009) (in French). Sudbury: Prise de parole. ISBN 978-2-89423-256-9.
- Malaborza, Sonya (2006). "La traduction du théâtre en Acadie - Parcours et tendances actuelles" (PDF). TTR: Traduction, terminologie, rédaction (in French). 19 (1): 175–203. doi:10.7202/016664ar. Archived from the original on March 3, 2016.
- Marcus, Jean-Claude (1980). "Les fondements d'une tradition théâtrale en Acadie". Les Acadiens des Maritimes (in French). Moncton: Centre d'études acadiennes, Université de Moncton.
- Viau, Robert (2006). "L'épée et la plume: La persistance du thème de la Déportation acadienne en littérature". Acadiensis (in French). XXXVI (1). Archived from the original on July 1, 2024.

=== Other works ===
- Cormier, Roger E (1993). "La Musique et les Acadiens". L'Acadie des Maritimes (in French). Moncton: Centre d'études acadiennes, Université de Moncton. pp. 845–878. ISBN 2921166062.
