= Antonine Maillet =

Canadian writer and scholar (1929–2025)

The Honourable Antonine Maillet PC CC OQ ONB FRSC
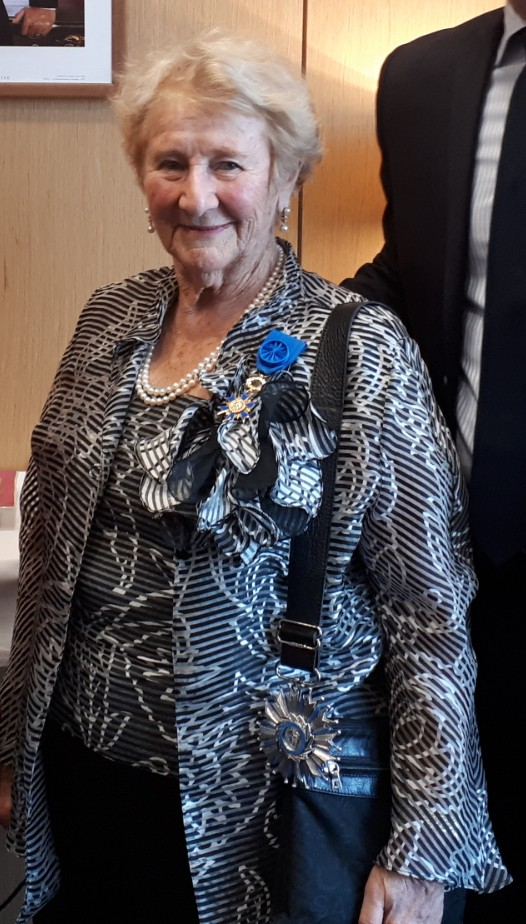
- Born: 10 May 1929; Bouctouche, New Brunswick, Canada
- Died: 17 February 2025 (aged 95); Montreal, Quebec, Canada
- Education: Collège Notre-Dame d'Acadie (BA, 1950); Université de Moncton (MA, 1959); Université Laval (PhD, 1971)
- Occupations: Writer, scholar
- Partner: Mercedes Palomino

Antonine Maillet (Note: French pronunciation: [ɑ̃tɔnin majɛ]) PC CC OQ ONB FRSC (10 May 1929 – 17 February 2025) was a Canadian novelist, playwright and scholar. She was a member of the Privy Council for Canada and the first non-European recipient of the Prix Goncourt, among other accolades.

== Early life and education ==
Maillet was born into an Acadian family on 10 May 1929 in Bouctouche, New Brunswick, as one of nine children in her family. Her mother died when she was 14 and her father died 10 years after.

Following high school, Maillet received her BA from the Collège Notre-Dame d'Acadie in 1950, followed by an MA from the Université de Moncton in 1959. She then received her PhD in literature in 1971 from the Université Laval. Her thesis is entitled Rabelais et les traditions populaires en Acadie ("Rabelais and Popular Traditions in Acadia").

== Career ==
Maillet taught literature and folklore at the Collège Notre-Dame d'Acadie (1954–1960), the Université de Moncton (1965–1967), the Collège des Jésuites de Québec (1968–1969), the Université Laval (1971–1974), and the Université de Montréal (1974–1975). She later worked for Radio-Canada in Moncton as a scriptwriter and host. In 1988, Maillet hosted the French-language Leaders' Debate for Radio-Canada TV between Prime Minister Brian Mulroney, Liberal Party of Canada Leader John Turner, and New Democratic Party leader Ed Broadbent. From 1989 to 2000, she served as chancellor of the Université de Moncton.

In 1976, she was made an Officer of the Order of Canada and was promoted to Companion in 1981. Maillet was awarded the Royal Society of Canada's Lorne Pierce Medal in 1980. In 1985, she was made an Officier des Arts et des Lettres de France and in 2005, she was inducted into the Order of New Brunswick. She was a member of the King's Privy Council for Canada from 1 July 1992. This gave her the right to the honorific prefix "The Honourable" and the Post Nominal Letters "PC" for Life. In 1979, her work Pélagie-la-Charrette won the Prix Goncourt, making her the first non-European recipient. This book was written in the Acadian vernacular.

In 1994, the Collège Militaire Royal theatre group performed in a play by Maillet both at CMR and at Royal Military College of Canada. Maillet was granted an Honorary Degree from RMC in 1995.

== Personal life ==
In 2022, Maillet publicly came out as a lesbian, having been in a relationship with actress and theatre director Mercedes Palomino until her death in 2006.

=== Death ===
Maillet died in her sleep during the night of 17 February 2025, at her home in Montreal. She was 95.

== Selected works ==
- Pointe-aux-Coques – 1958
- On a mangé la dune – 1962
- Les Crasseux – 1968
- La Sagouine – 1971
- Rabelais et les traditions populaires en Acadie – 1971
- Don l'Orignal – 1972 (winner of the (1972 Governor General's Award for Fiction)
- Par derrière chez mon père – 1972
- Gapi et Sullivan – 1973
- L'Acadie pour quasiment rien – 1973
- Mariaagélas – 1973
- Évangéline Deusse – 1975
- Gapi – 1976
- La veuve enragée – 1977
- Les Cordes-de-bois – 1977
- Le Bourgeois Gentleman – 1978
- fr:Pélagie-la-Charrette – 1979 (winner of the Prix Goncourt)
- Cent ans dans les bois – 1981
- Christophe Cartier de la Noisette dit Nounours, conte jeunesse illustré par Hans Troxler
- La Contrebandière – 1981
- Les drolatiques, horrifiques et épouvantables aventures de Panurge, ami de Pantagruel – 1981
- La Gribouille – 1982
- Crache à pic – 1984
- Garrochés en paradis – 1986
- Le Huitième Jour – 1986
- Margot la folle – 1987
- L'oursiade – 1990
- William S. – 1991
- Les confessions de Jeanne de Valois – 1992
- La nuit des rois – 1993
- La Fontaine ou la Comédie des Animaux – 1995
- Le Chemin Saint-Jacques – 1996
- L'Île-aux-Puces – 1996
- Chronique d'une sorcière de vent – 1999
- Madame Perfecta – 2002
- Le temps me dure – 2003
- Pierre Bleu – 2006
- Le Mystérieux Voyage de Rien – 2009
- Fais confiance à la mer, elle te portera – 2010

== See also ==
- List of French Canadian writers from outside Quebec
- List of Quebec authors
- Acadian theatre
