= Théâtre de Neptune =

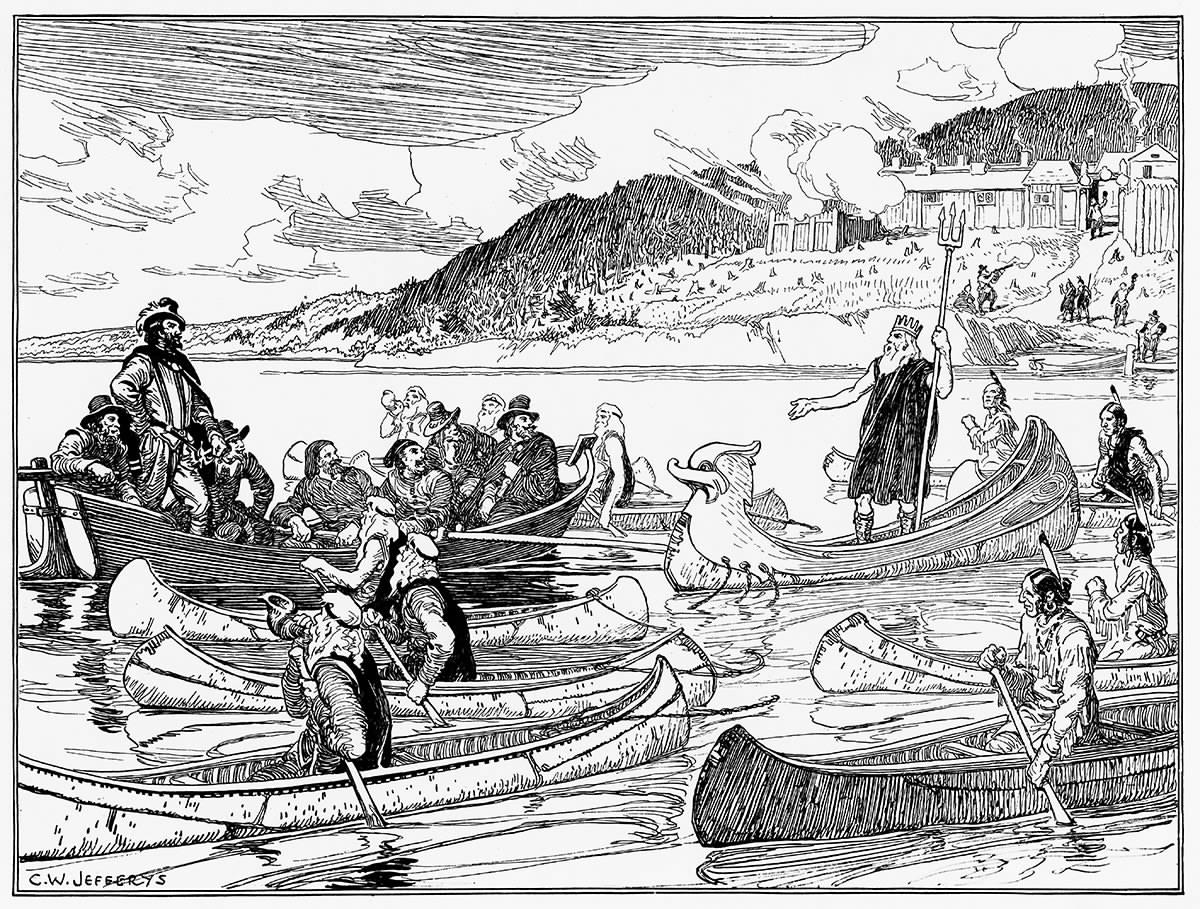
Play in Canada.jpg

Théâtre de Neptune was performed at Port Royal as the first theatrical production in North America. Marc Lescarbot (c. 1570–1641) wrote the play and is best known for his Histoire de la Nouvelle-France (1609), based on his expedition to Acadia (1606–1607) and research into French exploration.

Le Theatre de Neptune was performed in the harbour outside the French settlement of Port Royal on November 14, 1606. He published the play in 1609. The script attempts to prove the promise of New France. The play is a series of four welcoming speeches by Mi'kmaq chiefs. Each accepts the sovereignty of the French, unmistakably and unreservedly. These native people proclaim allegiance to the French monarch in their own territory, and that fact presses a question of the authenticity of the scripted representation. There are also welcoming remarks by Neptune and his court of six Tritons, followed by a banquet.

Hal Theriault performed The Landing, A Pageant, a staged reading at "The Re-enactment of de Mons Landing at Port Royal," July 16, 2005. In 2006, on the 400th anniversary of the first performance, a revival was planned by the Atlantic Fringe, but the performance was cancelled due to lack of CAC funding, as well as controversy over the perceived imperialist messages of the play. A "radical deconstruction" entitled Sinking Neptune was performed as part of the 2006 Montreal Infringement Festival, despite cancellation of the event it protested.

The play is the namesake of the Neptune Theatre in Halifax.

== See also ==
- Theatre of Canada
- Acadian theatre
