= Mercedes Palomino =

Actress and theatre director (1913–2006)

Mercedes Palomino CM CQ (February 2, 1913 – April 18, 2006) was a Spanish-born Quebec actress and theatre director. She was reportedly in a relationship with the writer Antonine Maillet.

== Biography ==
Palomino was born in Barcelona and moved to Argentina with her family at the age of five. Palomino studied at the National Conservatory of Dramatic Arts there, She went on to a career as a journalist and on radio. During the 1940s, she worked as an actor in Chile. She next worked as head of the theatre section of Radio-Lima. Palomino worked for CBS in New York City in 1946. Then, she worked in Paris as a reporter for La Prensa. In 1948, Palomino came to Montreal on assignment. Later that same year, with Yvette Brind'Amour, she founded the Théâtre du Rideau Vert. From 1953 to 1965, she was producer of Spanish services at Radio Canada International.

Palomino was awarded the Order of Canada in 1983. She received the Prix Victor-Morin in 1991, the Gascon-Thomas Award in 1992, a lifetime achievement award from the Governor General's Performing Arts Awards in 1994 and, also in 1994, was named a Chevalier in the National Order of Quebec. From 1969 to 1982, she served on the board of governors for the National Theatre School of Canada. From 1971 to 1985, she was president of the Association des Directeurs de Théâtre and, from 1986 to 2003, she was president of the Théâtres associés.
