= Gracia Couturier =

Canadian educator and writer (born 1951)

- Born: August 14, 1951 (age 75); Edmundston, New Brunswick, Canada
- Education: Université de Moncton (BEd)
- Occupations: Educator; writer

Gracia Couturier (born August 14, 1951) is a Canadian educator and writer.

She was born in Edmundston, New Brunswick. She has lived in Moncton since the 1970s. Couturier received a BEd from the Université de Moncton. She taught school for several years and completed a master's degree in French literature in 1994.

She was a founding member of the Théâtre l'Escaouette in Moncton and was founding director of Théâtre de saisons du Centre universitaire de Shippagan. Her work includes children's literature, novels, plays and haiku. Couturier has also worked as a script writer and researcher for Radio-Canada.

== Selected works ==
=== Children's literature ===
- Un tintamarre dans ma tête (2002)
- Le vœu en vaut-il la chandelle? (2003)

=== Novels ===
- L'antichambre (1997)
- Je regardais Rebecca (1999)
- Chacal, mon frère (2010), received the Prix des lecteurs Radio-Canada and the Prix France-Acadie

=== Plays ===
- Les enfants, taisez-vous! (1983)
- Le gros ti-gars (1986)
- Mon mari est un ange (1988), also rewritten for television
- Les ans volés (1988)
- Enfantômes suroulettes (1989)
- Conséquences (2019)
