= Marcel Dubé =

Canadian playwright (1930–2016)

Marcel Dubé OC OQ
- Born: January 3, 1930; Montreal, Canada
- Died: April 7, 2016 (aged 86); Montreal, Quebec
- Education: Collège Sainte-Marie
- Occupation: Author

Marcel Dubé OC OQ (January 3, 1930 – April 7, 2016) was a Canadian playwright. He produced over 300 works for radio, television, and stage. During his career he promoted the preservation and sanctity of the French language in Quebec.

== Early life and education ==
Dubé studied at Collège Sainte-Marie where he first became interested in theatre, frequenting the school's auditorium, the historic Salle du Gésu. He attended Westminster School during his high school years.

== Career ==
Dubé began writing plays as a young man, including Le Barrage which was staged by Theatre-club in 1955. He was soon able to earn his living as a writer. He founded the group Jeune Scène, and at the Dominion Drama Festival in 1953 won several awards with his play, De l'autre côté du mur which later became Zone. The play is still being performed sixty years later. He was also considered a founder of contemporary Quebec dramaturgy.

Over the next five years Radio-Canada presented, on radio and television, over 30 of his works (many of which he later adapted to the stage). He has produced over 300 works for radio, television and the stage. He wrote mainly in French; some of his works have been translated or subtitled in English.

His concerns for the preservation and sanctity of the French language in Quebec and around the world led him to participate in several organizations: He was first secretary, then president, of the Conseil de la langue française, president of the Rencontres francophones du Québec and cofounder and director of the Sécretariat permanent des peuples francophones.

In February 2001, he was named an Officer of the Order of Canada. and in 1993 became an Officer of the Order of Quebec.

== Works ==
- Zone, Montréal, Éditions de la cascade, Collège Sainte-Marie, (1953), (1968), (1971)
- Le temps des lilas, Québec, Institut littéraire, collection «Théâtre Canadien», (1958), (1969), (1973)
- Un simple soldat, Québec, Institut littéraire, collection «Théâtre Canadien», (1958), (1967), (1980)
- Florence, Québec, Institut littéraire du Québec ltée, (1960), (1970)
- Le Train du Nord, Montréal, Les Éditions du jour, (1961)
- Bilan, Montréal, Leméac, (1968)
- Textes et documents (partie 1), Montréal, Leméac, (1968)
- Les beaux dimanches, Montréal, Leméac, (1968)
- Hold-up, en collaboration avec Louis-Georges Carrier, Montréal, Leméac, (1969)
- Pauvre amour, Montréal, Leméac, (1969)
- Au retour des oies blanches, Montréal, Leméac, (1969)
- Le coup de l'étrier et Avant de t'en aller, Montréal, Leméac, (1970)
- Un matin comme les autres, Montréal, Leméac, (1971)
- Entre midi et soir, Montréal, Leméac, (1971), (1977)
- Le naufragé, Montréal, Leméac, (1971)
- The white geese, Toronto, new press, (1972)
- L'échéance du vendredi suivi de Paradis perdu, Montréal, Leméac, (1972)
- Textes et documents (partie 2), Montréal, Leméac, (1973)
- La cellule, Montréal, Leméac, (1973)
- Jérémie (argument de ballet), Montréal, Leméac, (1973)
- Médée, Montréal, Leméac, (1973)
- De l’autre côté du mur suivi de cinq pièces courtes, Montréal, Leméac, (1973)
- Manuel, Montréal, Leméac, (1974)
- Poèmes de sable, Montréal, Leméac, (1974)
- Virginie, Montréal, Leméac, (1974)
- L’impromptu de Québec ou le testament, Montréal, Leméac, (1974)
- L’été s’appelle Julie, Montréal, Leméac, (1975)
- Dites-le avec des fleurs, en collaboration avec Jean Barbeau, Montréal, Éditions Leméac, (1976)
- Octobre, Montréal, Éditions Leméac, (1977)
- Le réformiste ou l’honneur des hommes, Montréal, Éditions Leméac, (1977)
- Zone (Anglais), Toronto, Playwrights Canada, (1982)
- Le choix de Marcel Dubé dans l’œuvre de Marcel Dubé, Charlesbourg, Presses laurentiennes, (1986)
- L’Amérique à sec, Outremont, Leméac, (1986)
- Jean-Paul Lemieux et le livre, Montréal, Art global, (1988), (1993)
- Andrée Lachapelle : Entre ciel et terre, Montréal, Éditions Mnémosyne, coll. « Portraits d'artistes », (1995)
- Yoko ou le retour à Melbourne, Montréal, Leméac, (2000)
- Marie Labelle : Ottawa, Ontario

== Awards and prizes ==
- 1953 – Bourse du ministère du Bien-Être et de la Jeunesse
- 1958 – Bourse Canada Foundation
- 1959 – Award from the Canada Council
- 1961 – Member of the Royal Society of Canada
- 1961 – Membre de l’Académie des lettres du Québec
- 1962 – Governor General's Award
- 1966 – Award from the Canada Council
- 1970 – Bourse du ministère des Affaires culturelles du Québec
- 1973 – Prix Athanase-David (the highest cultural award granted by the Quebec government at the time)
- 1984 – Molson Prize, Canada Council
- 1985 – Membre de l’Ordre des francophones d’Amérique
- 1985 – Honorary doctorate of letters, Université de Moncton
- 1986 – Médaille de l’Académie des lettres du Québec
- 1987 – Médaille de l’Académie canadienne-française
- 1991 – Chevalier de l’Ordre de Pléiade de l’Assemblée internationale des Parlementaires de la langue française
- 2001 – Prix Mérite du français dans la culture
- 2001 – Officer of the Order of Canada
- 2001 – Officer of the National Order of Quebec
- 2005 – Governor General's Performing Arts Award
- 2006 – Prix hommage Québécor
