= Émile Lauvrière =

French historian of Acadia

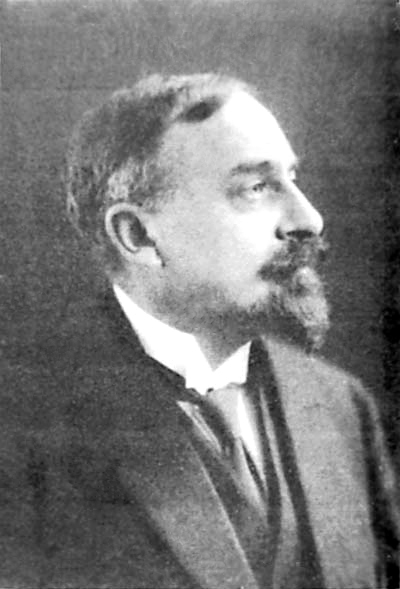
Émile Lauvrière

Émile-Joseph Lauvrière (1866 – 1954) was a French historian known for his research into Edgar Allan Poe, and the French-speaking North American Acadia colony and its people.

== Biography ==
Lauvrière was born on 3 December 1866, in Avranches in Normandy.

He began his tertiary studies in Paris and completed them in London. He obtained a doctorate in literature, specifically in English literature. Lauvrière wrote a dissertation on Edgar Allan Poe, entitled Edgar Poe, un génie morbide (Edgar Poe: A Morbid Genius) which was later published under the title Edgar Poe, sa vie et son œuvre ; étude de psychologie pathologique (Paris: Alcan, 1904). He then wrote a biography of Alfred de Vigny, before embarking on a similar course of study of Tennyson's poetry.

While studying Evangeline, Longfellow's poem of an Acadian girl during the time of the Expulsion of the Acadians, Lauvrière became interested in the history of the Acadian people. This new research subject led him to publish La Tragédie d'un peuple; histoire du peuple acadien de ses origines à nos jours (The Tragedy of a People; History of the Acadian People from its Origins to the Present Day) (1922).

Lauvrière would spend the next three decades studying Acadian history. However, he didn't just carry out academic research, Lauvrière also founded the Comité France-Acadie society dedicated to providing grants to Acadians who wished to complete their studies in France, as well as sending French-language books to Acadia.

Lauvrière died in Paris in 1954.

== Reviews ==
Abbé A. Couillard-Després wrote the book "En Marge de la Tragédie d’un Peuple de M. Emile Lauvrière, ou Erreurs sur l’histoire de l’Acadie réfutées" ("On the Margins of the Tragedy of a People by Mr. Emile Lauvrière, or Errors on the History of Acadia Refuted" critiquing Lauvrière's La Tragédie d'un peuple histoire du peuple acadien de ses origines à nos jours (The Tragedy of a People; History of the Acadian People from its Origins to the Present Day) (1922).

In the Canadian Historical Review's review of Couillard-Després's book, the author concurs that a chief flaw of Lauvrière's 1922 text is that it relies heavily on [Célestin] Moreau's History of Acadia going so far as to repeat one of Moreau's errors.

In his review of Lauvrière's Histoire de la Louisiane française (History of French Louisiana), Angel Mauvaud in the Bulletin Hispanique provides a three-page rundown of the book, noting the books coverage of three groups of French communities in Louisiana and suggesting that "it would be desirable for a similar work to be undertaken on the subject of the Spanish 'survivors' in a country where the names of many states or localities recall their origins".

== Publications ==
- (in French) Alfred de Vigny ; sa vie et son œuvre, Paris A. Colin, 1909.
- Repetition and parallelism in Tennyson, Londres, H. Frowde ; Oxford university press, 1910.
- (in French) La Tragédie d'un peuple histoire du peuple acadien de ses origines à nos jours, Paris, Bossard, 1922.
- (in French) Deux Traîtres d'Acadie et leur victime : les Latour père et fils et Charles d'Aulnaie, Montréal, Granger frères, 1932.
- (in French) Histoire de la Louisiane française, 1673-1939, Paris, Librairie Orientale et Américaine, 1940.
- (in French) Brève Histoire tragique du peuple acadien : son martyr et sa résurrection, Paris, A. Maisonneuve, 1947.
- (in French) Autobiographie, Memramcook, Université Saint-Joseph, 1952.
