= Zone (play) =

Play by Marcel Dubé

Zone is a French-language three-act play written by French-Canadian author Marcel Dubé. Written when Dubé was 21 and based on memories of his childhood, Zone revolves around a gang of teenaged Québécois criminals who sell contraband cigarettes, and the internal conflicts that ultimately tear the group apart.

== Cast ==
The original production of Zone was directed by Robert Rivard and first released on January 23, 1953.

- Monique Miller as Ciboulette (chives)
- Guy Godin as Tarzan
- Robert Rivard as Passe-Partout (master key)
- Raymond Lévesque as Moineau (sparrow)
- Hubert Loiselle as Tit-Noir
- Marcel Dubé as Johny
- Jean Duceppe as Ledoux
- Jean-Louis Paris as Police Chief
- Yves Létourneau as Roger
- George Hanigan as Andre (A)

== Characters ==
- The Love Interest (Ciboulette): Unloved by her parents, Ciboulette is the youngest group member at 16 years of age, and the only female in the play. She is in love with Tarzan but does not reveal this to him until the end. Her character's naïve hope for a relationship with Tarzan paired with her lust embodies the "extreme idealism of youth". Ciboulette's character is tragically punished for standing up for love.
- The Leader (Tarzan): The leader of the group of contrabandists. A 21-year-old man who crosses the Canada–US border to retrieve cigarettes, and smuggles them into Québec to be sold. He falls in love with Ciboulette, but recognizes that they cannot really be together. Tarzan is the "psychologically disturbed [victim] of circumstance" whose façade of control disappears during his interrogation, where it is revealed that his real name is François Boudreau and that he is an orphan. Only in death does Tarzan realize that he is already condemned due to his birth into the proletariat class, and that he cannot escape his fate.
- The Traitor (Passe-Partout): The traitor who accidentally leads the authorities to the abandoned warehouse where their stash of cigarettes is hidden, and who betrays Tarzan by telling the police that Tarzan crossed the US-Canada border the day a border-control officer was killed. It is revealed during his interrogation that his real name is René Langlois, and that he joined the group to provide food for his mother, because his father is an alcoholic who spends his salary on drinking. He has a sexual interest in Ciboulette, which complicates his relationship with Tarzan, as Tarzan is also in love with her. He is often seen as a realist in the play as he is the only one in the group that knows he is a criminal.
- The Trafficker (Tit-Noir): The group's accountant. It is revealed during his interrogation that his real name is Arsène Larue, and that he joined the group to obtain money for his future family and to study to become a priest. His nickname is "Tit-Noir" because when he was little, he had black hair, so his father called him "Petit-Noir", which eventually became "Tit-Noir". Tit-Noir serves a function similar to the messenger in Greek tragedy.
- The 'Somewhat Slightly Less Intelligent' (Moineau): At the age of 20, he is the most artistic of the group. He often plays the harmonica, and joined the group so that he could become a musician. His name comes from the French word for sparrow, a humorous way of calling him a featherbrain. His lack of intelligence is clearly shown several times throughout.
- The Truck Driver (Johny): The least seen of the gang, with only two lines. He drives the truck to the border with Tarzan. It is unclear whether he is a member of the group, or just a chauffeur.
- The Old, Experienced Policeman (Chief Policeman): Only seen during the second act, when he interrogates the group. He cleverly causes every member to reveal something they did not intend to. He has a son around the age of Tarzan, which makes it harder for him to send him to jail.
- "The New Guy" Policeman (Ledoux): The detective who follows Passe-Partout to the hideout.
- The Stereotypical Guard (Roger): A police officer who is present during the interrogations, and who shoots Tarzan, resulting in his death at the end of the play.

== Summary ==
Tarzan assembles a group of teenagers who, under the stress of their familial or economic situations, agree to sell cigarettes smuggled into Canada from the United States. Ciboulette, the youngest of the group and the only female, is in love with Tarzan, but does not reveal this despite Tit-Noir's urging, as she is worried it will ruin the business. Tarzan risks capture by crossing the Canada–US border with contraband cigarettes. While the others wait for Tarzan to return, Passe-Partout attempts to supplant as the gang's leader, and disobeys Tarzan's instructions by stealing a wallet from a passerby, who is actually a detective, Ledoux. Tarzan returns to the hideout but Ledoux arrives at the gang's hideout and arrests the teenagers with a police brigade.

The second act begins in the police station's interrogation room. Each member is questioned individually. During the interrogations, the police receive a call informing them that a border patrol guard was murdered earlier that day. The police chief interrogates Passe-Partout, who reveals that Tarzan had crossed the border that day. Under the impression that the other gang members have betrayed him, Tarzan confesses to the murder of the border guard.

In the third act, the group talks about what they will do to Tarzan at the prison, and how they will execute him. Later on, it is seen on the news that Tarzan has escaped from prison. He goes straight to the "Hangar" where they keep the cigarettes. The police had cleaned it out, so there was no longer anything and it was empty. Tarzan and Ciboulette ask the others to give them a moment so they step out. Tarzan and Ciboulette confess their love for each other and share a few kisses. Tarzan gives money to Ciboulette so she can have a better chance in life while she is saying to keep it for himself because he is going to need it to escape and get a better life for himself. He stays with Ciboulette until the cops come to get him and when he is shot, Ciboulette whispers things to him and holds him close.

== Inspiration ==
Dubé based Zone in part on a past experience illegally crossing the Canada–US border.

== Analysis ==
Zone takes place in a "squalid" environment, familiar territory for Dubé, whose works often dealt with the social disorder in French Canada at that time. The characters in Zone, trapped within the poverty of their social milieu, resort to "adolescent ideals" in an attempt to escape. Laroche suggests that the teenaged gang members are play-acting as the characters they saw in films. Dubé's characters reveal their deepest thoughts and feelings in their dialogue, reflecting their underlying helplessness. The irony is that the gang, who began engaging in criminal activities to escape the societal "grey zone" they inhabit, are ultimately punished by the same society that offered them no support. Although the characters in Zone work in a collective, they tear each other apart through internal rivalries and betrayal, rendering them incapable of standing up to society, represented in Zone by the police who interrogate the gang. It also deals with the complicated romantic relationship between a 21-year-old man, Tarzan; and a 16-year-old girl, Ciboulette.

== Reception ==
Edwin Hamblet criticized Zone for its "sudden and perfunctory" conclusion, finding that "Dubé tends to have trouble in ending his plays" and citing the artificiality of the plot twists. In 1953, Zone was awarded the Grand Prix for the best Canadian play at the Victoria National Drama Festival. Zone also won the Calvert, Sir Barry Jackson and Louis Jouvet prizes.
