= Clément Cormier =

Canadian priest and academic (1910–1987)

- Born: January 15, 1910; Moncton, New Brunswick
- Died: July 28, 1987 (aged 77)

Father Clément Cormier, CC (January 15, 1910 – July 28, 1987) was a Canadian priest, academic and the vice chancellor and founder of Université de Moncton.

Born in Moncton, New Brunswick, the son of Clément Cormier and Léontine Breau, he received a Bachelor of Arts in 1931, from Université Saint-Joseph. He was ordained in 1936. In 1940 he received another bachelor's degree from Université Laval. From 1948 until 1963, he was the rector of Université Saint-Joseph.

From 1963 to 1968, he was the founding rector of the Université de Moncton. In 1968 he founded the fr:Centre d'études acadiennes (Acadian Studies Centre) which he directed until 1974. From 1973 until 1978, he was the Chancellor of the Université de Moncton.

In 1967 he was made an Officer of the Order of Canada and was promoted to Companion in 1972.

Throughout his career, Clément Cormier worked to promote and study history, language and culture. He was president of the New Brunswick Museum in Saint John, New Brunswick in 1953-1954, and in 1960 he became the founding president of the Acadian Historical Society.
