= Religion in Acadia =

History of religion in Acadia

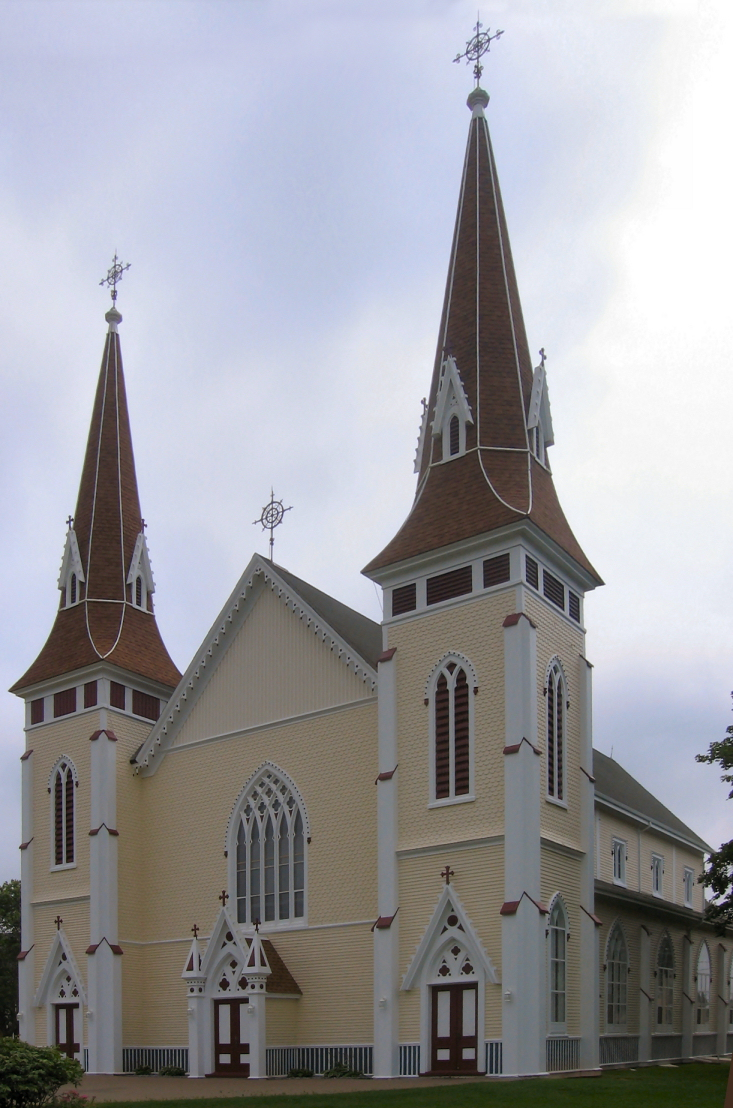
Saint-Jean-Baptiste Church of Miscouche.

The majority of Acadia's population (Note: Acadia broadly includes the northern and eastern parts of the Canadian province of New Brunswick, as well as more isolated localities in Prince Edward Island, Newfoundland and Labrador, and Nova Scotia. In a broader sense, Acadia also refers to the Acadian diaspora communities located in Quebec and the United States; people of Acadian ancestry are also found in France, the Falkland Islands, and the West Indies. Acadia is not officially recognized but is said to form a nation through its language, culture, institutions, and symbols.) adheres to Roman Catholicism. The history of religion in Acadia is closely intertwined with the broader history of Canada. Several parishes were established before 1710, including Saint John the Baptist in Port-Royal, Saint-Charles-des-Mines in Grand Pré, Sainte-Famille in Pisiguit, and Saint-Joseph at Rivière-aux-Canards. By 1750, additional parishes such as Notre-Dame de l’Assomption in Pisiguit and Saint-Pierre et Saint-Paul in Cobeguit were founded,

Towards the end of the 19th and beginning of the 20th centuries, the Acadian population militated for better representation in the clergy, which was then controlled by English speakers. Religious communities played an important role in education and health care until the 1970s. The religious practice then declined. Catholicism in Acadia accords an important place to women, notably in the cult of Sainte Anne. Many traditions linked to the sea and Sainte Anne are still popular. In southeastern New Brunswick, some Acadians or Chiacs practiced a religious blend of native spirituality and Catholicism. Protestant communities are present in Acadia, as is a small Jewish community in Moncton.

== History ==
The Acadians were originally tolerant of other religions and denominations, as some of their founders were Protestants. Before 1710, Acadian parishes included not only the first parish at Saint John the Baptist in Port-Royal, but also Saint-Charles-des-Mines in Grand Pré, Sainte-Famille in Pisiguit, and Saint-Joseph at Rivière-aux-Canards, though only some parish registers survive. By 1750, additional parishes emerged, such as Notre-Dame de l’Assomption in Pisiguit and Saint-Pierre et Saint-Paul in Cobeguit. This doesn't include known missionary churches.

Acadians retained freedom of religion following the Treaty of Utrecht in 1713. Following the deportation of the Acadians, relations became strained between the population and the priests and bishops, who were now mostly Scottish or Irish, and English-speaking. Acadian priests were trained following the opening of Collège Saint-Joseph in 1865, but these were sent mainly to English-speaking regions. A debate over the "Acadianization" of the clergy began in the 1880s, and the first bishop, Édouard Alfred Leblanc, was appointed in 1913. A movement was then organized to petition the Pope for better representation in the clergy, despite Anglophone opposition, with success. The request to create an archdiocese in Moncton caused even more opposition but was also accepted in 1936. The Diocese of Edmundston was detached in 1944, while the Diocese of Yarmouth was separated from Halifax in 1953. The Catholic faith remained linked to Acadianity until the 1940s when a majority of the elite were either religious or had been educated in Catholic colleges. Religious communities played a fundamental role in education and health care until the 1970s. As in many parts of the world, religious practice then declined, as the number of priests fell and some parishes were no longer served. The Catholic faith remains important for a large part of the population, but its link with Acadianity is likely to be different in the future, according to historian Naomi Griffiths.

== Organization ==
Acadians are predominantly Catholic. The Archdiocese of Saint John covers Newfoundland and Labrador, the Archdiocese of Moncton includes all of New Brunswick, while the Archdiocese of Halifax covers both Nova Scotia and Prince Edward Island.

== Acadian interpretation and traditions ==
The interpretation of Catholicism in Acadia gives an important place to women, a situation demonstrated by the large number of churches dedicated to a saint, cathedrals dedicated to Marie or Saint Anne, and the fact that two female religious communities, the Congrégation des Filles de Marie de l'Assomption and the Congrégation des Religieuses de Notre-Dame du Sacré-Cœur, were founded, unlike the male communities, which all originate from Quebec or France. The cult of Saint Anne is very important, and the imposition of Marie de l'Assomption as patron saint has not changed this. The sea also occupies an important place in religion, notably through the ever-popular celebration of Fisherman's Sunday and the blessing of boats.

== See also ==
- Acadia
- History of the Acadians
- Acadians
- Cajuns
- Acadian French
- Acadian folklore
- Acadian literature
- Acadian architecture
- Acadian theatre
- Acadian cuisine
- Acadian Renaissance
- Société Nationale de l'Acadie
- Acadian cinema

== Bibliography ==
- Arsenault, Georges (1983). La religion et les Acadiens à l'Île-du-Prince-Édouard : 1720–1980 [Religion and the Acadians in Prince Edward Island: 1720–1980] (in French). Summerside: Société Saint-Thomas-d'Aquin. p. 102.
- Thériault, Léon (1993). "L'acadianisation des structures ecclésiastiques aux Maritimes, 1758–1953" [The Acadianization of Ecclesiastical Structures in the Maritimes, 1758–1953]. In Daigle, Jean (ed.). L'Acadie des Maritimes : études thématiques des débuts à nos jours [Acadia in the Maritimes: thematic studies from the beginning to the present day] (in French). Moncton: Centre d'études acadiennes, Université de Moncton. p. 431-466. ISBN 9782921166065.
- Lamontagne, Denise (2011). Le culte à Sainte-Anne en Acadie [Worship at Sainte-Anne in Acadia] (PDF) (in French). Québec: Presses de l'Université Laval. p. 455. ISBN 978-2-7637-9323-8.
- Landry, Michelle; Pépin-Filion, Dominique; Massicotte, Julien (2021). L'état de l'Acadie [The State of Acadia] (in French). Montréal: De Busso. p. 436-446. ISBN 9782925079224.
