= Acadian folklore =

Traditional Acadian stories, music, customs, and beliefs

Until the late 19th century, the isolation of Acadians (Note: Acadia includes roughly the north and east of the Canadian province of New Brunswick, as well as more isolated communities in Prince Edward Island, Newfoundland and Labrador, and Nova Scotia. In a broader sense, Acadia also refers to the Acadian diaspora communities in Quebec and the United States; people of Acadian descent can also be found in France, the Falkland Islands and the West Indies. Acadia is not officially recognized, but is said to form a nation through its language, culture, institutions and symbols.) helped preserve a rich and varied folklore, passed down through generations.

== History ==
The ancestors of the Acadians primarily originated from western France, including regions such as Touraine, Aunis, Saintonge, Charente, and Bas-Poitou (later known as Vendée). They also came from areas like Burgundy, Upper Brittany, the Basque Country, and Paris, among others. However, authors from the 17th to 19th centuries provided relatively sparse commentary on Acadian folklore. It is known that Acadian folklore and, more broadly, Acadian culture developed through interactions with Indigenous peoples, French Canadians, Scots, Irish, and French sailors, whether passing through or deserting their ships.

Folklore was somewhat disregarded by the elite until the newspaper L'Évangéline began publishing a column on Acadian songs by Thomas LeBlanc in 1939. Later, Anselme Chiasson and Daniel Boudreau compiled the collection Chansons d'Acadie between 1942 and 1956. This sparked interest in Acadian folklore among foreign researchers, which was soon mirrored by Acadians themselves. The Université de Moncton has been teaching folklore since 1966, and its Centre for Acadian Studies, along with Université Laval, houses significant collections on the subject. The largest collection of Acadian legends, comprising 20,000 entries, was cataloged between 1973 and 1982 by Catherine Jolicoeur.

Traditional songs are now featured in media and performances; these songs also helped launch the careers of Édith Butler and Angèle Arsenault. Additionally, folklore has inspired numerous authors, including Antonine Maillet.

== Life cycle ==
According to the French folklorist Arnold van Gennep, a rite of passage involves three stages: the end of one phase, a transitional stage between two phases (such as engagement), and rebirth. Among Acadians, it is primarily marriage and death that are marked by rites of passage.

=== Pregnancy and Childbirth ===
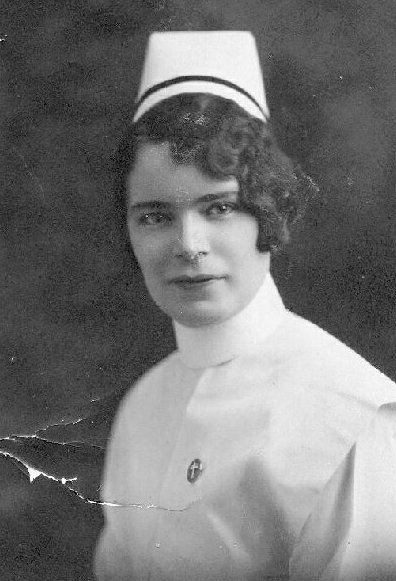
Édith Pinet.

Traditionally, a woman would work almost up to the day of giving birth unless there was a risk of miscarriage. In such cases, a woman would remain bedridden, and one remedy involved placing a saucer filled with garlic on her stomach.

Children were kept unaware of the pregnancy, and the mother’s bed rest was explained as being due to a "broken leg." In New Brunswick, other explanations included the passage of Indigenous people or the mid-Lent festival (Mi-Carême). On the day of delivery, children were sent to relatives and were told that the baby had been found in the hay, a pond, the woodpile, a spring, a tree stump, or under a cabbage leaf. In some regions, the explanation was instead that the baby had been brought by the "savages", the Mi-Carême, the midwife, or the doctor.

In the past, the midwife stayed with the mother for two or three days. Today, 88% of Canadian women receive prenatal care in hospitals, and most give birth there. However, the profession of midwifery was officially recognized in New Brunswick in 2008. A notable midwife was Édith Pinet (1904–1999).

The postpartum recovery period (*relevailles*) traditionally occurred about ten days after childbirth, after which the mother gradually resumed her activities. Baptisms were simple ceremonies, without church bells ringing or any celebration at home.

=== Childhood ===
A child's hair is not cut before the age of one to prevent them from becoming an "idiot", and they are kept from seeing themselves in a mirror to avoid becoming vain.

Educational games are taught to children as soon as they can understand them. Later, they play many games similar to those found in Quebec, though often under different names: dodgeball, four corners, blind man's bluff, hide-and-seek, the button game, and hot potato. Games are often accompanied by songs, particularly among girls. Riddles, puzzles, tongue twisters, and nursery rhymes are also popular with children and often have counterparts in other French-speaking regions.

=== Adolescence ===
Before the rise of industrialization in the 20th century, girls stayed home to help their families or work in the fields. Occasionally, they were hired out as servants. Boys also worked on farms, chopped firewood, or, near the coast, fished with their fathers. By the late 19th century, more young men began leaving home to work, initially in logging camps.

The lack of recreational activities in earlier times led many young people to play pranks. In some cases, the damage became so severe that the Bishop of Quebec had to intervene. Certain towns became notorious for their "rock throwers." This tradition of mischief persists on Halloween, where some youth engage in acts like toilet papering trees and public spaces or even setting cars on fire. In rare cases, police officers allow themselves to be pelted with eggs in hopes of reducing vandalism.

=== Courtship ===
Up until the early 20th century, courtship was closely monitored by most parents. A young woman would never go out without a chaperone, and courtship took place only in her home. A suitor could visit his girlfriend only on designated "good evenings" and had to behave appropriately, refraining from paying too much attention to her.

To initiate a private meeting, the young man might toss a matchstick or twig to signal that she could join him away from the group. If she was not interested, she would respond with a subtle gesture. Courtships were typically brief, and the formal proposal occurred when the young man invited the girl's parents to a private room for discussion. In some places, such as the Magdalen Islands, there were fixed rituals for proposing. The young man might bring a gift for his future in-laws, such as grapes.

=== Marriage ===
The parents of the bride and groom collaborate with the priest to arrange the wedding preparations. While there is no formal dowry, the bride may receive various items or farm animals from her family, depending on their means. Weddings often take place in the winter, during a break in seasonal work. They are never held during Lent or Advent. In Chéticamp, weddings frequently occur on Tuesday mornings following Epiphany.

In the early 19th century, the bride and groom wore their Sunday best, adorned with ribbons and rosettes. The carriage transporting them to the church could also be decorated with ribbons. By the 20th century, the fathers of the bride and groom replaced bridesmaids and groomsmen as witnesses to the ceremony. In earlier times, the newlyweds were greeted with musket shots, and the bride might be "stolen" in a symbolic mock abduction.

The wedding dinner typically took place at the bride's parents' home, while the supper and evening gathering were hosted by the groom's parents. It was customary to perform special wedding songs or songs of the bride. A dance followed the meal; traditionally, this was often the only occasion where the priest permitted the community to dance. At midnight, the bride would shake hands with the guests before retiring, while the dancing might continue until morning. Honeymoons became a common practice in the 20th century.

The supper and evening gatherings were considered essential. If omitted, or if the marriage was disapproved of, the community would impose a charivari—a noisy demonstration that could last for days or even weeks until the couple invited the rowdy participants to share a drink. The tradition of the charivari persists in southeastern New Brunswick.

In the past, if the groom was the youngest son, he and his wife remained with his parents. They cared for the parents, who in turn assisted them and typically left them their estate.

=== Old Age and Death ===
Before the construction of homes for the elderly or disabled in the second half of the 20th century, parishes or councils ensured they were housed through the “sale of the elderly,” an auction held on the church steps. Upon their death, their belongings were also auctioned off to fund their funerals.

It was customary to hold a vigil for the deceased over two consecutive nights. The body, covered with a white sheet and a handkerchief, was displayed on wooden planks. Children’s coffins were covered in white, while those of adults were black. Mourning could last up to a year and a half. Widows would wear black, while widowers donned a black crêpe armband. In Memramcook, mourning was followed by a period of “half-mourning,” during which widowers avoided wearing bright colors.

The coffin was laid to rest in the cemetery, where a temporary wooden cross was erected, often later replaced with a headstone. The soil around the grave was maintained for years. In Nova Scotia, grass was removed, and the grave was decorated with white pebbles collected from the beach, typically arranged in the shape of a cross surrounded by a circle.

== Genealogy ==
A child often receives the name of the saint or holy figure associated with the day of their baptism, or a biblical name. Historically, only the first name was used in daily life, with the surname reserved for official records, correspondence, or interactions with outsiders. To differentiate people, names were extended using the father’s and often the grandfather’s names: for instance, "Simon à Jean à Thomas" or "Abraham à Jacques à Pierre." A special “healer’s name” was given to the seventh child in a family, as it was believed they could cure certain ailments through touch alone.

== Calendar ==
Acadians follow the Gregorian calendar, which closely aligns with the religious calendar, thanks to the Christianization of former pagan festivals. It divides the year into a growing season—characterized by milder weather, intense activity, and fewer festivities—and a dormant season in winter, during which most celebrations take place. The main festivities include New Year’s Day, Epiphany, Candlemas, Mardi Gras, and Mid-Lent, all occurring between Christmas and Easter. Over time, some festivals have lost popularity while new ones have emerged. It is worth noting that Chiasson et al. classify agrarian events as part of material culture rather than traditional festivities.

The people of Chéticamp were known to use two systems for dating years: the Gregorian calendar and another based on extraordinary events, often related to the sea. For example, 1861 was known as "the year of Moses’ wreck" (raque à Moïse, from the English word "wreck"), referring to the discovery of a shipwreck by sailors near Anticosti Island.

=== New Year's Eve ===
In Chéticamp, people say they "bury the old year", while in southwestern Nova Scotia, they "kill the old year", and in the Magdalen Islands, they "bury the rear of the year." Adults often stay up past midnight on December 31. Families and friends gather to play cards, sing songs, and shake hands while wishing each other a happy New Year at the end of the evening. The arrival of the new year may also be marked by gunshots. In Chéticamp and the Magdalen Islands, there is a tradition of "beating the old year", where people gather with sticks and hit the corners of houses at a signal.

=== New Year's Day ===
It is customary to shake hands and wish others "A good and happy new year and paradise at the end of your days" as early as possible. In southeastern New Brunswick, Nova Scotia, the Magdalen Islands, and among those of Scottish descent, superstition dictates that the first visitor to enter a house on New Year’s Day should be a young man—often a neighbor enticed with money, cookies, or candies. Allowing a girl to enter first is believed to bring bad luck to the household. In Chéticamp, boys knock on doors with wooden hammers made specifically for the occasion. In this town, gunshots are not fired on December 31 but instead at noon on January 1, a tradition shared with the region’s Germans.

The paternal blessing, a tradition originating from Quebec, is practiced mainly in areas bordering the province. A campaign in 1935 to promote the custom failed to make it widespread.

In some communities, people maintain the tradition of forgiving each other’s wrongdoings. Some Acadians wear new clothes on New Year’s Day, hoping to continue doing so throughout the year. Children visit their godparents to wish them a happy new year and receive candy, money, or naulets—sweet, person-shaped cookies.

=== Epiphany (Les Rois) ===
The celebration of Les Rois corresponds to the Christian feast of Epiphany. During this time, a gâteau des Rois (King's Cake) is shared. In New Brunswick, the person who finds the ring hidden inside the cake is predicted to marry, the one who finds the medal is destined for a religious vocation, and the one who finds the button will remain single. In Nova Scotia, the cake is exclusively for girls and contains only a bean that predicts a life of singleness. In Prince Edward Island, Madawaska, and other parts of New Brunswick, hidden objects in the cake—typically a bean for a girl and a pea for a boy—are used instead to elect a king and queen. These crowned figures preside over the evening’s festivities and open the dance. In Prince Edward Island, a full royal court is recreated, complete with attendants and royal attire.

=== Candlemas (Chandeleur) ===
The name Chandeleur refers to the blessing of candles at church. In some Acadian communities, it is considered the most important celebration of the year. Groups of people go around their village on a "Candlemas quest" to collect provisions for a grand supper, which is held in a selected house on February 2. The quest is led by a chief carrying a staff known as the escaouette, which may be topped with a rooster, a hoop, or ribbons, depending on the region. The participants might be in disguise, dressed in old clothes, or uncostumed. When welcomed into a house, they perform the escaouette dance or sing the escaouette song:

"Monsieur, madame mariées,
N'ont pas encore soupé.
Va dans ton quart
Me chercher du lard
Va dans ton baril (ou grenier)
Me chercher de la farine."

This dance inspired the name of Théâtre l’Escaouette (L'Escaouette Theatre) in Moncton. After collecting provisions in a bag, the participants leave each house while singing, to the tune of the hymn O Filii et Filiae:

"En vous remerciant mes gens d'honneur
D'avoir donné pour la chandeleur
Un jour viendra
Dieu vous l'rendra. Alléluia!"

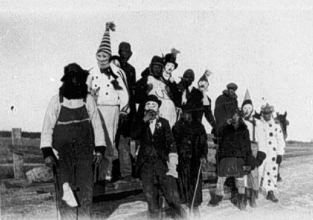
The Chandeleur quest in Barachois in 1932. Credit: Centre d'études acadiennes Anselme-Chiasson.

Although the tradition of Chandeleur disappeared by the mid-20th century, it was successfully revived in 1974 in Cap-Saint-Georges and in 1986 in Memramcook. The community supper, open only to families who contributed with food, can feature a variety of dishes but nearly always includes pancakes. Pancake suppers, though not historically universal across Acadian communities, remain widespread.

In Nova Scotia, there is a tradition of flipping pancakes in the pan by tossing them in the air. If a person drops their pancake, they must eat it as it is, on all fours, without using their hands. In New Brunswick, an object is hidden in the pancake, similar to the gâteau des Rois: a ring signifies marriage, a button indicates singleness, a coin predicts wealth and a piece of fabric foretells poverty. The feast is typically followed by a dance. Leftover food is distributed to families in need.

Candlemas also marks the end of winter. Historically, Acadians used this time to take stock of their food supplies. The impending arrival of spring is reflected in proverbs such as "À la Chandeleur, la neige est à sa hauteur" ("At Candlemas, the snow is at its peak") and "À la Chandeleur, les jours rallongent de trois quarts d'heure" ("At Candlemas, the days are longer by three-quarters of an hour").

=== Valentine’s Day (Saint-Valentin) ===
Initially, Acadians exchanged anonymous cards on Valentine’s Day, often as a form of social commentary, satire, a reminder of the recipient’s quirks, or even as an act of revenge. These cards typically featured caricatures or drawings accompanied by brief text. Since 1935, however, it has become customary to exchange greeting cards expressing love or friendship.

=== Shrove Days (Jours gras) ===
The Sunday, Monday, and Tuesday—commonly known as Mardi Gras—before Lent are days of celebration. On Prince Edward Island, the festivities can last an entire week. Traditional activities include evening gatherings with dancing, singing, card games, visiting neighbors, and drinking alcohol, sometimes to excess. In northern New Brunswick, children would dress in costumes and go from house to house collecting taffy or candy, a tradition similar to some regions in Quebec.

The Mardi Gras feast varies by region but often includes dishes like pâté à la râpure (grated potato pie), poutines râpées (boiled potato dumplings), or pancakes. A song, “Mardi gras, va-t’en pas, je ferai des crêpes et t’en aura” ("Mardi Gras, don’t go away, I’ll make pancakes, and you’ll have some"), accompanies the pancake tradition.

=== Lent (Carême) ===
Lent begins on Ash Wednesday and lasts forty days. Traditionally, Lenten fasting was very strict, allowing only two ounces of bread for breakfast, one full meal at lunch, and a small snack for dinner. Initially, the consumption of meat was entirely prohibited; today, however, observant Catholics typically abstain from eating meat only on Wednesdays and Fridays. Additionally, some people give up sweets or attempt to quit smoking during this period.

In deeply religious families, Lenten practices might include communal recitation of the rosary in the morning, attending mass as frequently as possible, participating in the Stations of the Cross on Fridays, and singing hymns about the Passion of Christ.

=== Mid-Lent (Mi-carême) ===
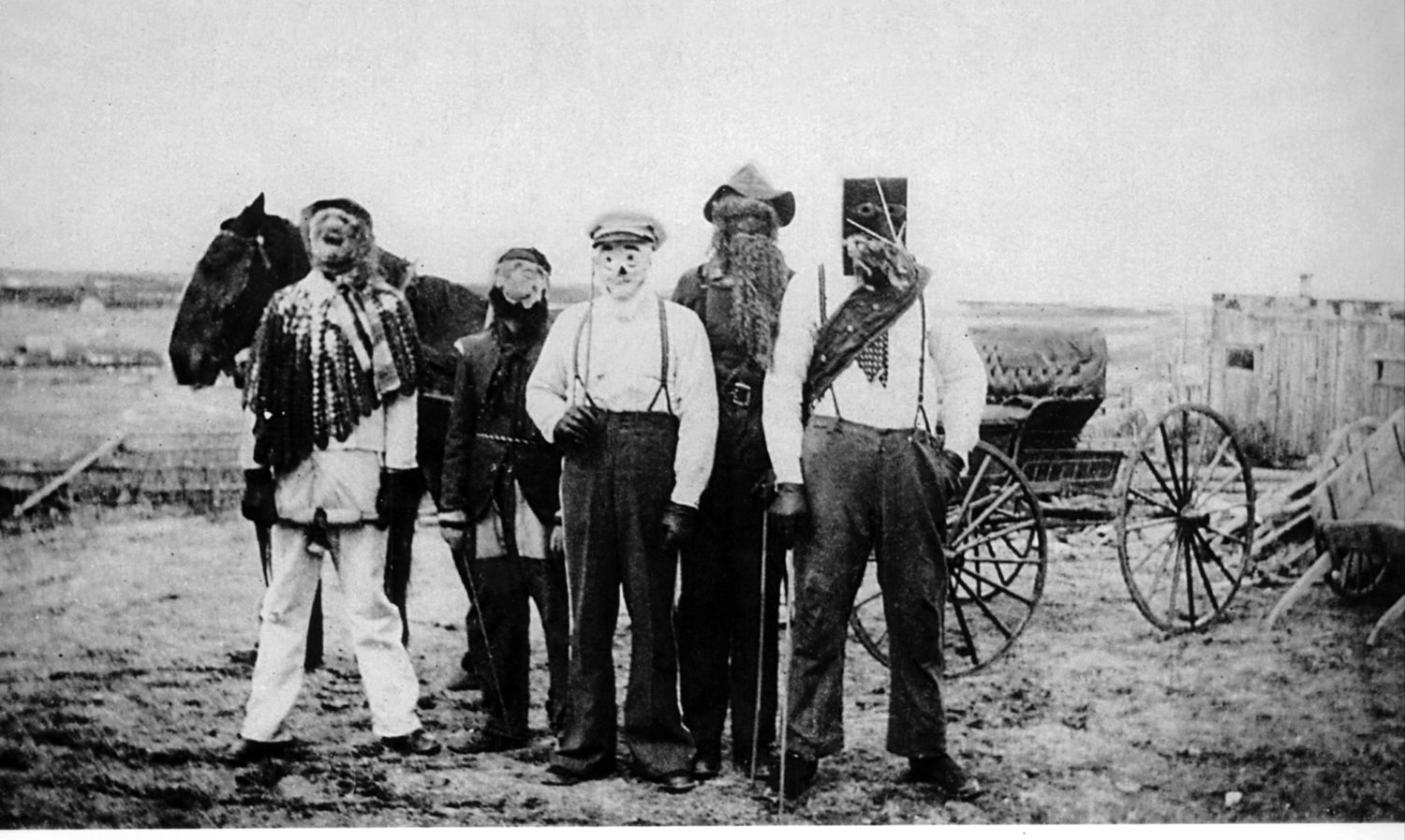
A Mi-Carême troupe in Saint-Joseph-du-Moine in 1930. Credit: Collection Centre de la Mi-Carême

Mid-Lent, or Mi-Carême, is often more popular than Shrove Days. Young people, among others, dress up in homemade costumes, cover their faces with masks, arm themselves with sticks, and "run the mi-carême." They visit houses, dancing, gesturing, and even speaking while trying not to be recognized. In some communities, it’s an opportunity to raise funds for the poor, while in Nova Scotia, the focus is more on the playful aspects of the tradition.

In Kent County, the evening before Mid-Lent is called petite mi-carême, during which children go door to door collecting sweets. In Westmorland County, Prince Edward Island, and some areas of Nova Scotia, it is the vieille mi-carême, an elderly woman who hands out treats, hiding her identity with a stick and a sheet over her face.

Several clergy members banned mi-carême in the early 20th century or moved it to coincide with Shrove Days. Its decline can also be attributed to the spread of automobiles. The tradition has survived only in Chéticamp, where it now lasts an entire week.

=== April Fools’ Day (Premier avril) ===
It’s common to "run the April fish" by fooling someone with jokes like “There’s a deer at the edge of the woods!” When the person falls for the prank, they are told, “Poisson d’avril!” (April Fool!) or “Largue ta ligne!” (Drop your line!). This tradition is widespread across many countries.

=== Palm Sunday (Dimanche des Rameaux) ===
On the Sunday before Easter, people bring branches to church to be blessed in remembrance of Christ’s entry into Jerusalem. These branches are made from plants that last a long time, such as pine or fir tips, and are then distributed throughout homes, outbuildings, and boats. It is believed that they protect against lightning, demons, fire, and witches.

=== Good Friday (Vendredi saint) ===
Good Friday was observed with very strict fasting among the Acadians. Some families refrained from eating all day and even prevented their animals from being fed. Silence was maintained between noon and 3 p.m. Butchering and hunting were also avoided out of respect for Christ’s blood.

Fishermen at sea paid attention to the wind’s direction during the reading of the Passion, believing it would indicate the prevailing wind for three-quarters of the year.

=== Easter (Pâques) ===
Easter marks the arrival of spring and the transition to summer festivities, which are religious and involve celebrations only after completing necessary chores. In Kent County and Pomquet, around midnight on Easter Eve, small groups of people go door to door to "sing Hallelujah" to the tune of the hymn O Filii et Filiae:

Réveillez-vous gens qui dormez.
Notre-Seigneur est ressuscité.
En Galilée vous le verrez.
Alléluia!

In the former village of Claire-Fontaine, people would take their rifles decorated with ribbons and shoot into the air after singing:

Alléluia, carême s'en va.
Réveillez-vous nous faire cuire des œufs.
Si vous nous faisez [sic] cuire des œufs pourris
Le Bon Dieu vous punira.

The inhabitants of the house were then expected to wake up and serve eggs or rum. This tradition disappeared in the early 20th century.

On Easter morning, it is customary to draw water from an Easter stream against the current, believing it does not spoil and is medicinal. In southwestern Nova Scotia, this formula is recited when drawing the water: “Blessed be this water, which heals all ailments.” This tradition persisted for a long time and still exists in the northwest of New Brunswick.

It is believed that the Sun is brighter and dances on Easter morning; some people wake up very early in hopes of witnessing this phenomenon.

Chickens do not lay eggs during the winter, but if they lay eggs before Easter, the eggs are saved for Easter morning, leading to a feast or even egg competitions. The tradition of decorating Easter eggs is well-established, originally using natural substances such as lichen or onion skins.

=== Spring Festivals (Fêtes printanières) ===
The "Festival of Little Birds" originated in ancient Acadia, when a missionary proclaimed a day of fasting and prayer to drive away birds that were eating seeds in the fields. This festival was celebrated mainly in southeastern New Brunswick until the early 20th century, and in Memramcook until the 1940s.

The "Festival of Snow" took place during particularly long winters and involved praying for divine intervention. In the 19th century, both festivals were fixed on the Monday after Quasimodo Sunday, eight days after Easter. Another festival involved having a bag of seeds blessed at church, either on Saint Mark's Day (April 25) or during the three days of Rogations in May.

=== First Snow of May (Première neige de mai) ===
It is believed that the first snow of May, dedicated to Mary, has the power to heal many ailments, particularly eye troubles. As a result, people collect several bottles of "May water" from this snow.

=== Feast of Corpus Christi (Fête-Dieu) ===
A solemn procession of the Blessed Sacrament takes place on the Sunday following the Feast of Corpus Christi. The route is marked with fir trees, flags, and banners, and two altars are set up in front of residences or open fields. Participants in the procession chant hymns and pray the rosary, while the associations and congregations present display their standards or banners.

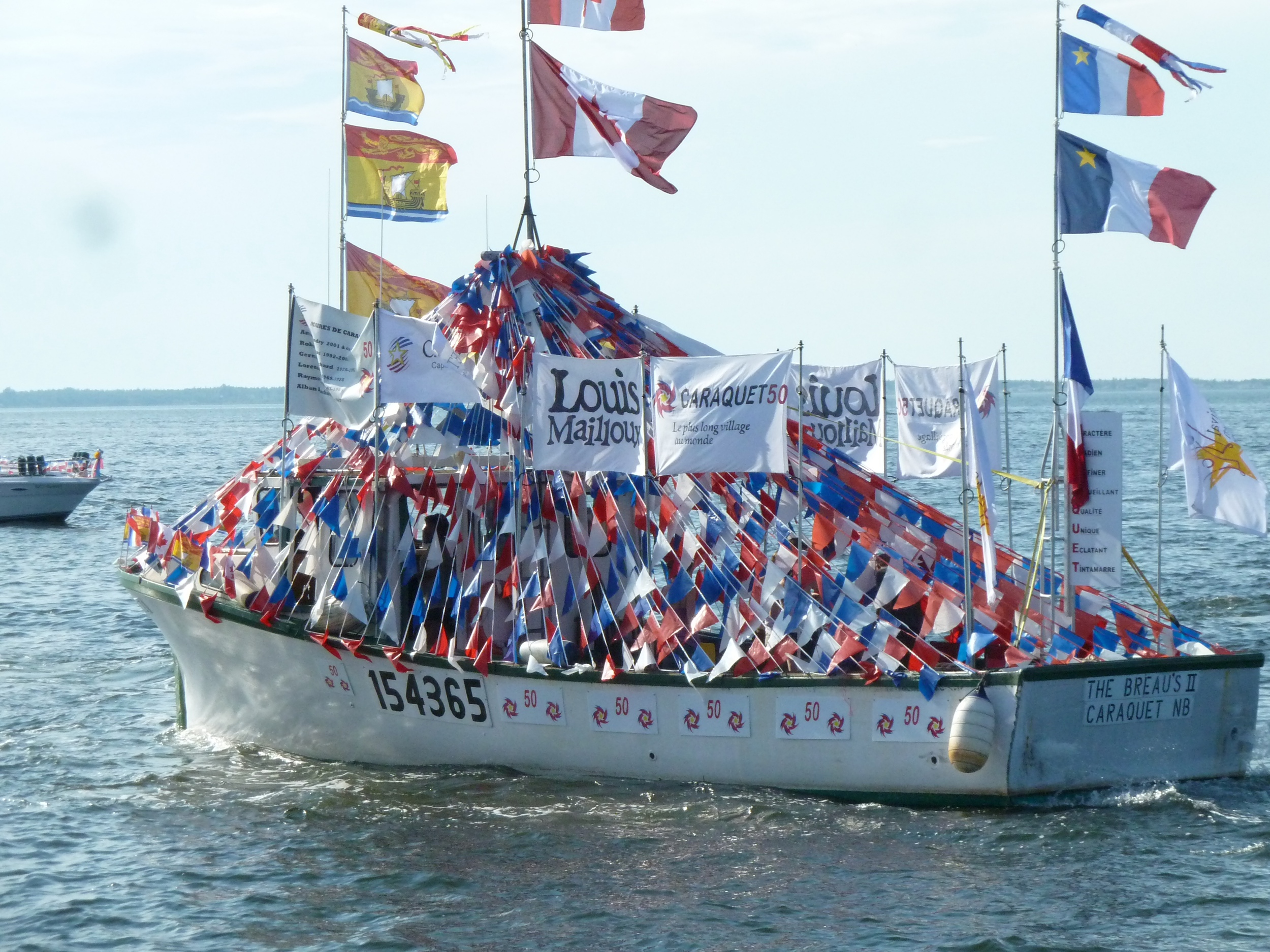
The blessing of the boats in Caraquet.

=== Blessing of the Boats (Bénédiction des bateaux) ===
The blessing of the boats has been held in the summer since the 1930s, sometimes on the feast of Saint Anne (July 26), but generally during the local Acadian festival. All the boats in the region are decorated with flags and banners. In Cap-Pelé, the best fisherman is crowned king. In this village, the memory of fishermen lost at sea is honored, and a widow throws a funeral wreath into the water before the priest blesses the fleet.

=== Patronal Festivals (Fêtes patronales) ===
Each parish has its patron saint, and the feast of this saint may be celebrated with a mass and observed as a day of rest. Our Lady of the Assumption became the patroness of the Acadians in 1881, and August 15 became their national feast day. On this day, a solemn mass is held at the church, followed by patriotic speeches and often a picnic, games, and a dance. Many communities align the end of their local Acadian festival with August 15, with the main celebration taking place in Caraquet.

=== Heatwaves (Canicules) ===
In the past, many people believed that water was unsafe for swimming between July 22 and August 23. This period of the year is associated with chores, which are followed by social gatherings that end with a meal.

=== All Saints' Day (Toussaint) ===
A unique tradition of All Saints' Day in Acadia is to play pranks the night before, known as the "night of pranks." These pranks might involve hiding farming tools, fishing gear, animals, and, in Nova Scotia and the Magdalene Islands, cabbages. Stealing cabbages is not considered a crime on this night, and a meal is held the next day, called "cabbage stew" at Isle Madame. This custom comes from the Scottish people in the region, who refer to this dinner as Cabbage Night.

=== Day of the Dead (Jour des morts) ===
Three masses in black vestments and visits to the cemetery commemorate this holiday on November 2. It is common to avoid chopping wood or plowing the fields to prevent harming the deceased, as it is believed they return to earth on this day. The "cry of souls" was a custom that has disappeared. It involved auctioning off animals and vegetables on the church porch, with the proceeds used to hold masses for the deceased.

=== Advent (Avent) ===
Advent, or "les avents" in Acadian French, covers the four weeks leading up to Christmas, a period in which festivities or weddings are avoided. In Chéticamp, Christmas rosaries are recited, while in other regions, regular rosaries are recited, with one final rosary on Christmas Eve. In Kent County, the "thousand Hail Marys" (mille avé) is recited instead. In all cases, the goal is to obtain a favor.

=== Christmas (Noël) ===
Christmas is primarily a religious holiday, marked by a midnight mass, during which hymns and the song "Minuit, chrétiens" (O Holy Night) are sung. The tradition of the Christmas Eve dinner dates back to the 20th century. However, setting up a nativity scene in front of the church is an older tradition, as is the practice of traveling to church in a horse-drawn carriage lit by lanterns, with passengers shouting "Merry Christmas" and continuing to sing hymns. The custom of hanging Christmas stockings only dates back to the late 19th century. At the turn of the 20th century, parents began giving gifts to children, though these gifts remained modest until the 1940s. Children did not initially believe in Santa Claus; instead, the belief that it was the Christ Child who brought gifts persisted. Interior decorations, including the Christmas tree, began to appear at the start of the 20th century. A legend, not unique to Acadia, suggests that domestic animals talk to each other at midnight, but those who go to listen risk dying.

== Legends (Légendes) ==
Legends are stories about real events and facts, often with some truth, but exaggerated over time and typically featuring the marvelous or supernatural. Most Acadian legends involving supernatural characters, such as elves and mermaids, have been lost. However, those related to the devil, ghosts, and religion in general have tended to persist, particularly due to the continued importance of religious practices.

=== Animals (Animaux) ===
Many legends mention dogs, cats, horses, or wild animals. For example, there is a story of an impious man hunting on a Sunday who decides to resume religious practice after seeing a deer with a human face. There is also a legend of a large black dog or a black beast with a large tail that appears in the evening, which could be linked to reports of black panther sightings in New Brunswick. The "Bœuf à Marek" is an evil creature mentioned by fishermen on the Acadian Peninsula.

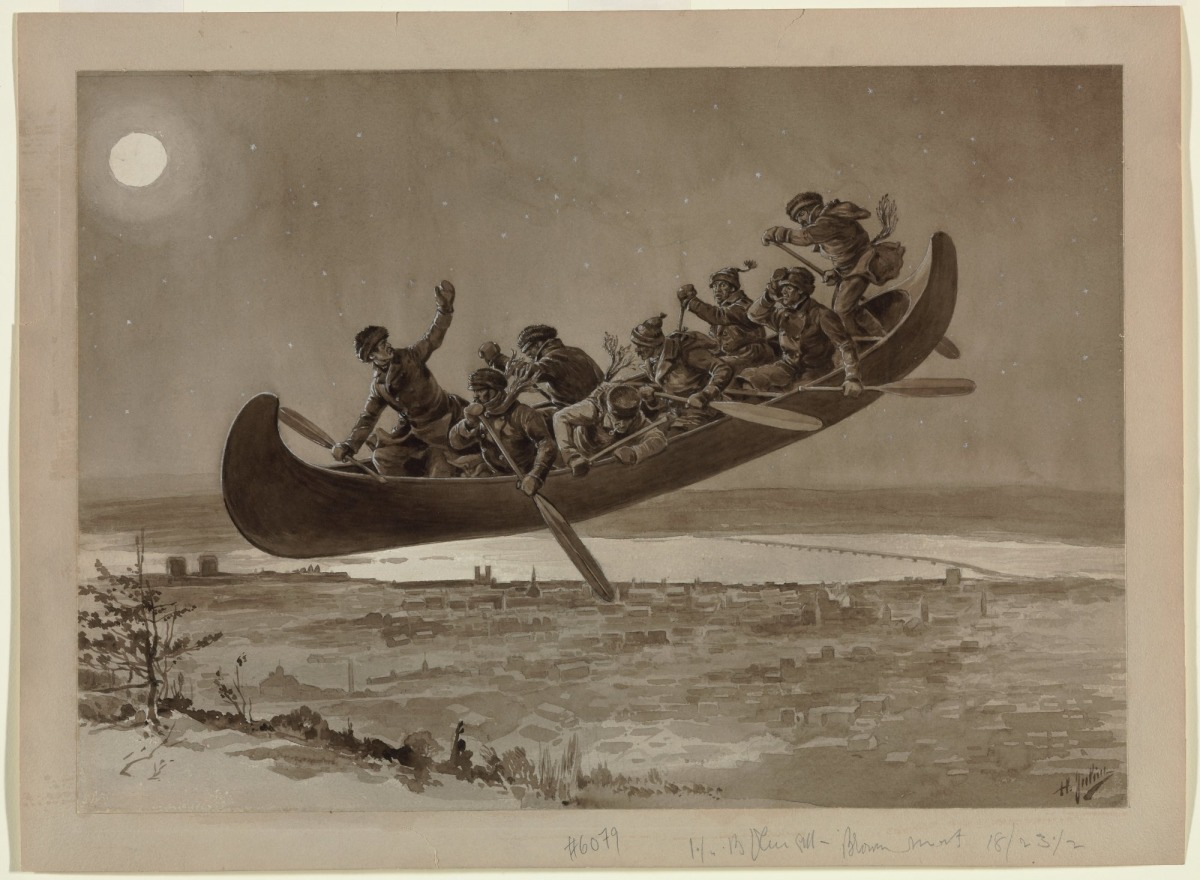
Henri Julien, La Chasse-galerie, 1906, Musée national des beaux-arts du Québec.

=== Chasse-galerie ===
The practice of chasse-galerie ("The Bewitched Canoe") allows one to travel through the air at great speed, over very long distances, and even to other countries, by mounting a wooden beam, log, plank, or tub, and pronouncing a magic phrase. Another more common version, popular in Quebec, involves a group traveling through the air, often in a canoe, accompanied by singing and loud noises.

=== Devil (Diable) ===
The devil is the subject of several legends but typically only appears to take souls or prevent them from escaping. For example, there is the "devil at the dance" or the "devil fisherman" legends. It is said that one could sell their soul in exchange for the devil's help; in Nova Scotia, suspicions arose regarding fishermen who made unusually long trips in too little time with a reduced crew. The devil is believed to create obstacles on the path of a priest traveling to the bedside of a dying person. He is also said to be responsible for the strange behavior of certain people, a situation that would require the help of an exorcist priest.

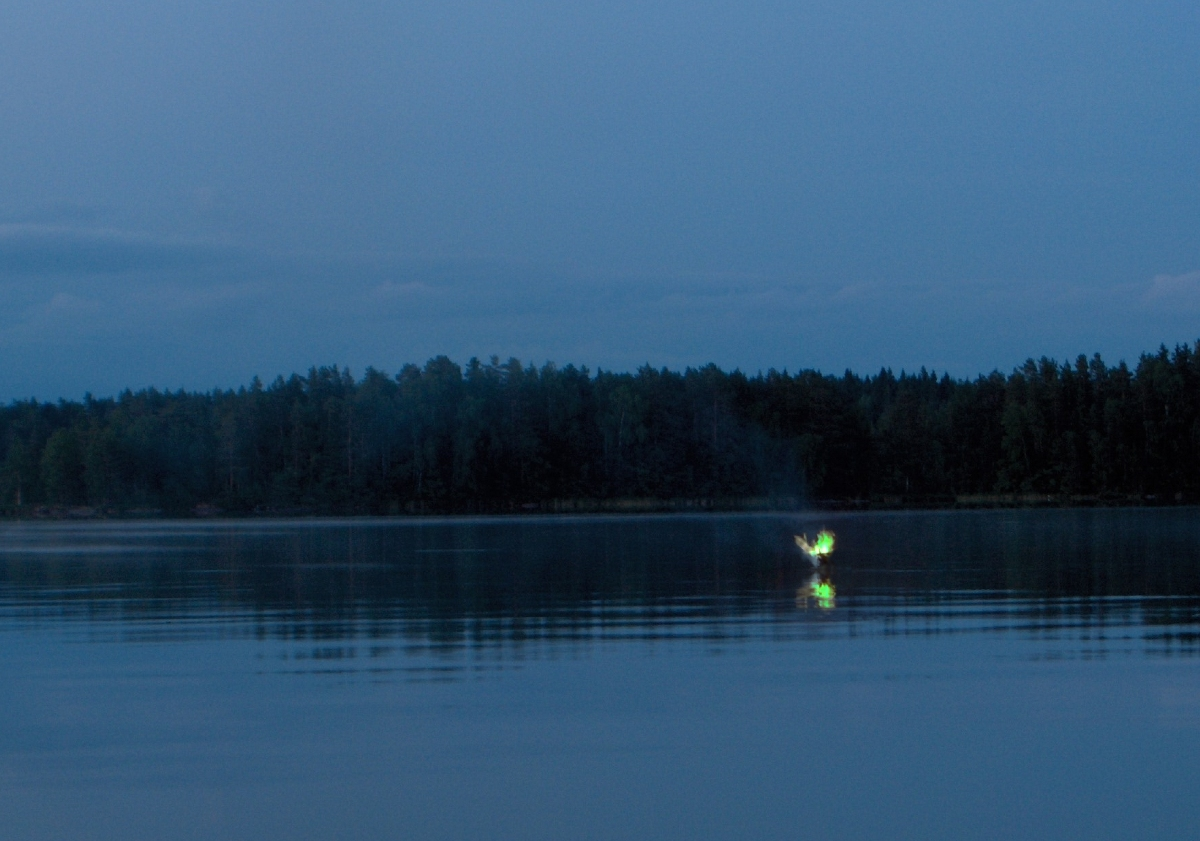
Reconstruction of a will-o'-the-wisp.

=== Will-o'-the-wisps (Feux follets) ===
Will-o'-the-wisps move at night, usually just a few meters above the ground, typically in swamps and marshes. Their purpose is to lure passersby to their doom. The will-o'-the-wisps attempt to scare their victims by emitting a mocking laugh and blinding them by swiftly passing in front of their eyes.

=== Werewolves (Loup-garous) ===
Werewolves are witches or ordinary people who have sold their souls to the devil and transform into dogs or bears at night. Only by wounding them and causing them to bleed can they be freed, except in the Sainte-Marie Bay area, where it is believed that this only traps them forever in their transformed state.

=== Goblins (Lutins) ===
The belief in lutin (little goblins or sprites) is widespread throughout Acadia. Tiny yet human-shaped, these creatures are especially interested in horses. They enter stables at night, create stirrups from horsehair, and make the animals gallop for hours. They take care of the horses, and a horse that has been "lutinized" becomes fatter.

=== Haunted houses (Maisons hantées) ===
A house is often believed to be haunted following a murder or suicide. A ghost may appear, but usually, it is sounds such as chains, crying, and footsteps that are heard. Haunted houses exist both in rural areas and in cities; Catherine Jolicoeur recorded 14 haunted houses in Moncton, and one of the pavilions at the University of Moncton is said to be haunted by a nun who died in a fire.

=== Extraordinary characters ===
In the 19th century, strongmen were highly respected and even feared, especially in the minority context of the Acadians and the intolerance of English speakers. They often took on a larger-than-life, Rabelaisian character, such as Gros-Jean Doiron from Saint-Anselme, who was said to be able to kill a bear with his bare hands and eat entire pots of bear meat.

There are a few other local legends, but they are rare. One of them is the Antichrist of Sainte-Marie Bay, inspired by the Apocalypse according to Saint John.

=== Omens (Présages) ===
Certain signs are believed to indicate the future; these are omens. For example, finding a horseshoe or a four-leaf clover is considered lucky; a raven perched on a roof signifies death; two workers striking their tools together means they will continue working together for at least a year. Fishermen have their own superstitions: never wear mittens of any color other than white or gray, never bring a pig aboard a boat or even say the word "pig", never whistle, and never turn the hatch door upside down. Some girls believe that eating a salted biscuit in the evening or placing a mirror under their pillow will make them dream of their future husband. These superstitions still resonate today, for example, with "lucky numbers" in the lottery.

=== Ghosts (Revenants) ===
Revenants typically appear as a silent human figure or remain invisible but make noise. The importance of religion might explain this belief; revenants always require a prayer or a mass, the righting of wrongs, or the correction of certain individuals' behavior. The apparitions cease once the promise is fulfilled.

=== Sirens (Sirènes) ===
According to Chiasson et al., the siren is an example of an ancient legend that has survived in Acadia. Every coastal region has its own version, but it seems that in the Îles de la Madeleine, some people claim to have heard sirens singing, seen them, and even spoken with them.

=== Witches (Sorciers) ===
In the past, strange behaviors in people or animals, or inexplicable transformations, were attributed to witches—mysterious outsiders or marginalized Acadians who had supposedly made a pact with the devil in order to cast spells. In New Brunswick and Prince Edward Island, Indigenous people, especially women, were believed to have the power to cast spells; they were known as taoueilles. Witches took advantage of people's credulity to extract gifts from them. It was believed they cast spells by reciting formulas from Petit Albert, the devil’s bible, which priests tried to burn all copies of. Anti-witches could supposedly reverse spells and remove curses using a magic formula or by boiling water, needles, and something belonging to the person or animal affected, such as their hair, in a cauldron.

=== Treasure (Trésors) ===
There are probably real treasures buried in Acadia, but most legends add fabulous elements to them. Typically, pirates would have decapitated a crew member to bury him with the treasure, so he could serve as its guardian. Alternatively, the treasure may have been dedicated to the devil, who would guard it. A treasure could only be unearthed at midnight without uttering a word, or it would vanish or change location. The guardian cannot harm treasure hunters but can create frightening images, chain sounds, howls, or unbearable smells. Most legends end with the treasure hunters fleeing.

=== Ghost Ship (Vaisseau Fantôme) ===
The ghost ship is the most common Acadian legend. This large sailing ship is said to often appear in flames, with sailors running on deck and climbing the rigging. Most versions explain the phenomenon as a "pirate ship that was punished for its crimes and condemned to reappear in flames as proof of its exemplary punishment." It is mostly observed along the Northumberland Strait and in the Bay of Chaleurs, where it is called the "fire of bad weather." In this bay, its appearance is said to predict a storm.

== See also ==
- History of the Acadians
- Acadian Renaissance
- Fireship of Baie des Chaleurs
- Acadian diaspora
- Religion in Acadia
- Acadian art
- Société Nationale de l'Acadie
- Acadian cinema
- Music of Nova Scotia

== Bibliography ==
- Chiasson, Anselme; Cormier, Charlotte; Deschênes, Donald; Labelle, Ronald (1993). "Le folklore acadien". In Daigle, Jean (ed.). L'Acadie des Maritimes. Moncton: Centre d'études acadiennes, Université de Moncton. pp. 649–706. ISBN 2921166062.
