= Fireship of Baie des Chaleurs =

Unusual visual phenomenon

The Baie Chaleur Fireship, more commonly referred to as the Chaleur Phantom or the Phantom Ship, is a form of ghost light, an unusual visual phenomenon, occasionally seen in Bathurst, New Brunswick or across the bay in New Carlisle, Quebec. It takes the form of an arc of light, usually seen before a storm. Its cause is unknown, but speculation includes rotting vegetation, undersea releases of natural gas, and St. Elmo's fire.

The phenomenon has been the source of many a tall tale, and has been said to appear as a flaming three-mast galley much like the style of ship featured on New Brunswick's provincial flag. Local accounts of the supernatural vessel claim that it is possible to hear the screams of the burning ship passengers by submerging one's feet in the Chaleur Bay waters. Sightings are claimed to be most frequent on hot summer nights.

== Versions of the story ==
=== Portuguese captain selling Mi'kmaq ===
In this version of the fireship tale, a Portuguese captain arrived on the shores of Heron Island in Chaleur Bay in 1501. Upon his second trip to the region to capture more Mi'kmaq natives for the slave trade, he was tortured and killed by the locals who had bitter memories of his first visit. A year later his brother came looking for him and was also attacked by the locals; their ship caught fire and they jumped into the waters and swore to haunt the bay for 1,000 years. In several eye witness reports from early settlers on Heron Island, most notably the Pettigrew family, the ship is most often seen on the north side of the island, during the full moon. In a horrifying incident, Mrs. Pettigrew reported to be on her veranda at dusk one summers evening in 1878, when a ghostly figure of a sailor appeared at the corner of the farm house, and reportedly asked her to help him see to his burns. When she turned away from the figure to run inside, it apparently brushed by her and to her horror she realized he was legless. Victims, both Mi'kmaq and Portuguese of the sinking, reportedly washed up on the shores of the island, and were buried in shallow graves at French Woods, a low-lying area at the west tip of the island.

=== Pirate killing near Port Daniel ===
This Restigouche lady's version tells of a group of pirates who killed a woman. With her dying words she cast a curse upon them that "For as long as the world is, may you burn on the bay."

=== Sailor murdered aboard ===
Sailors aboard a ship heading to sea in bad weather feared they would die and blamed their bad luck on one of their own whom they murdered. When the ship caught fire, it was told that it was Catholic blood reaping its vengeance.

== Explanation ==
Dr. J. Orne Green, a professor from Harvard Medical School, investigated and concluded it was a natural phenomenon, electrical in nature.

Professor William Francis Ganong, who visited the area, believed the Fireship of Baie des Chaleurs to be a case of St. Elmo's fire. He wrote a paper on the subject in 1906.

G. L. Ellis, a geologist from Newnham College, Cambridge, speculated that the fireship might be marsh gas that had drifted over water.

== See also ==
- St. Louis Light
- Flying Dutchman
- Acadian folklore
- Acadian Renaissance
