= Acadian Renaissance =

Acadian cultural, political, and economic revival in 19th century

The Acadian Renaissance is a period in the history of Acadia spanning, according to sources, from 1850 to 1881.

== Literary influence ==
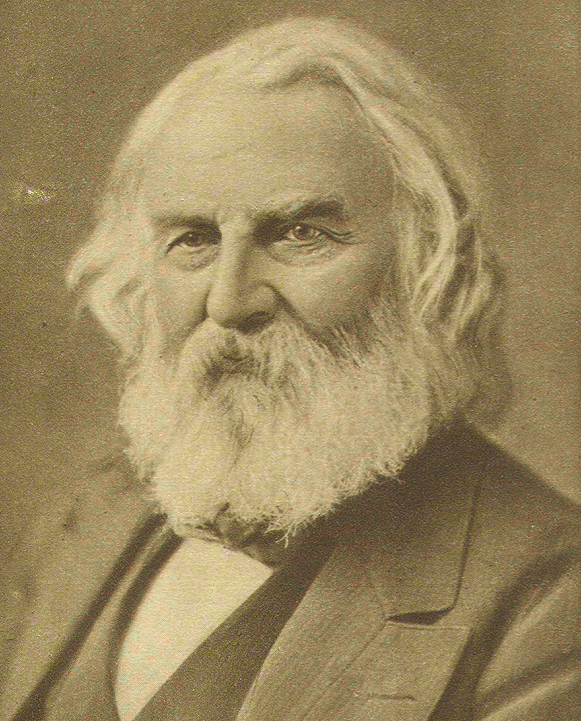
Henry Longfellow.

Two works mark a turning point in the Acadian Renaissance, the most significant being the poem Evangeline, published by the American Henry Longfellow in 1847. The Acadians see themselves reflected in this story, with the fictional couple Evangeline and Gabriel symbolizing, in a way, the history of the Acadians — their dispersion as well as their eventual reunion. In 1859, the French author François-Edme Rameau de Saint-Père published La France aux colonies: Acadiens et Canadiens, the first of its two parts focusing on the history of the Acadians. Through this work, the Acadians discover the story of their people in their language.

Rameau remained deeply interested in the Acadians until his death. He visited Acadia twice and, in 1889, published another work, Une colonie féodale en Amérique: l’Acadie, 1604-1881. Furthermore, he corresponded with several Acadian elites, discussing key issues and helping the Acadians forge connections with the broader Francophone world.

== Canadian Confederation ==
The Maritime provinces all obtained responsible government (Note: In a responsible government, ministers are accountable to their elected representatives.) in 1850. In terms of foreign policy, free trade was established within the British Empire following the victory of the Whigs in the United Kingdom in 1846. This harmed the economies of the colonies, and annexation to the United States was proposed as a solution. The Canada–U.S. Reciprocity Treaty, valid for at least ten years, was signed in 1854 between British North America (Note: British North America refers to the British colonies in North America between 1763 and 1867.) and the United States. However, the treaty was terminated by the United States in 1864 due to the United Kingdom's support for the Confederate States of America.

In response, the Maritime Union was proposed as a way to secure new economic markets. Delegates at the Charlottetown Conference ultimately proposed the Canadian Confederation, which would include the Maritimes as well as Upper Canada and Lower Canada. (Note: The province of Québec was created in 1763 from the colony of Canada in New France. It was separated into Upper and Lower Canada in 1791. These two parts were merged again in 1841 to form the Province of Canada, or United Canada. At the time of Canadian Confederation in 1867, Upper Canada became Ontario and Lower Canada became Quebec.) The Confederation was approved by London and the colonial legislatures without a referendum, causing public dissatisfaction. Anglophones in coastal regions and Acadians opposed the Confederation, believing it would harm their economies.

In New Brunswick, Acadians voted against the Confederation twice, and the few anti-Confederation legislators were nicknamed the "French Brigade" for this reason. Acadians on Prince Edward Island also initially voted against the project but later approved it. The union of New Brunswick, Nova Scotia, Ontario, and Quebec was established on July 1, 1867. Prince Edward Island joined the new country in 1873.

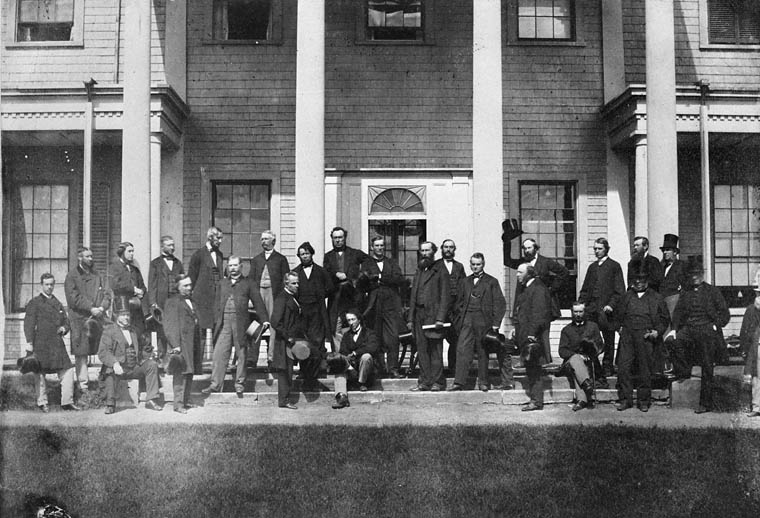
Representatives at the Charlottetown conference.

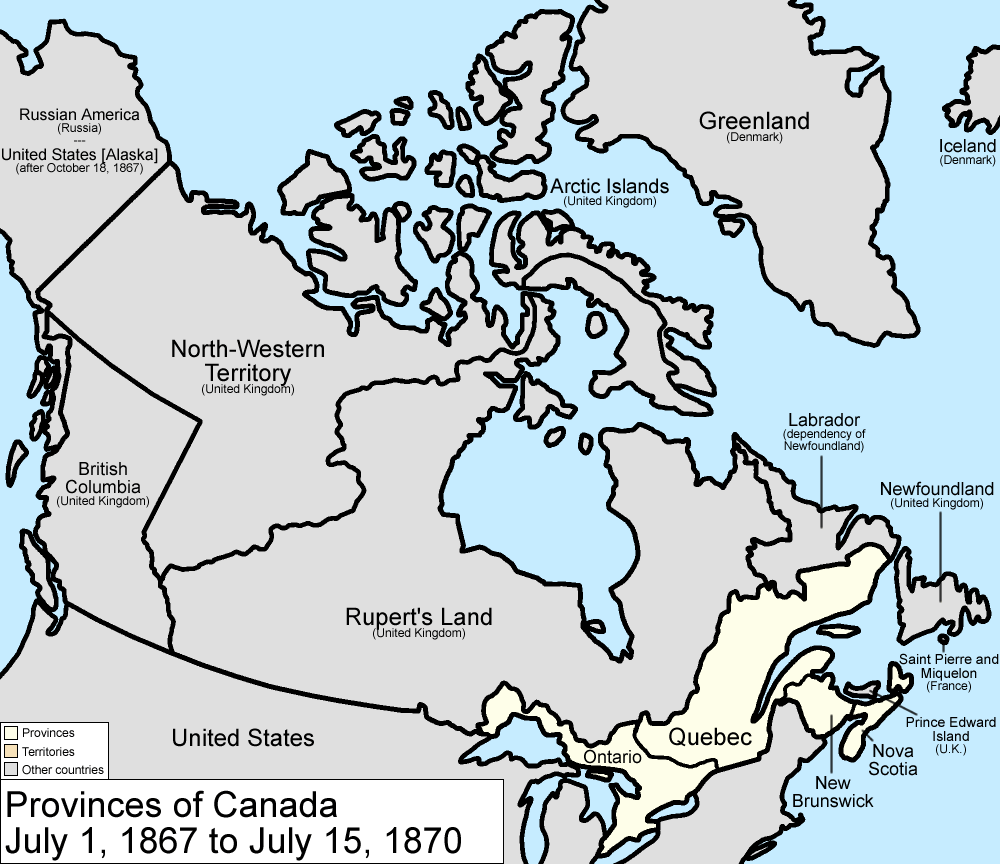
Canada at its beginnings in 1867.

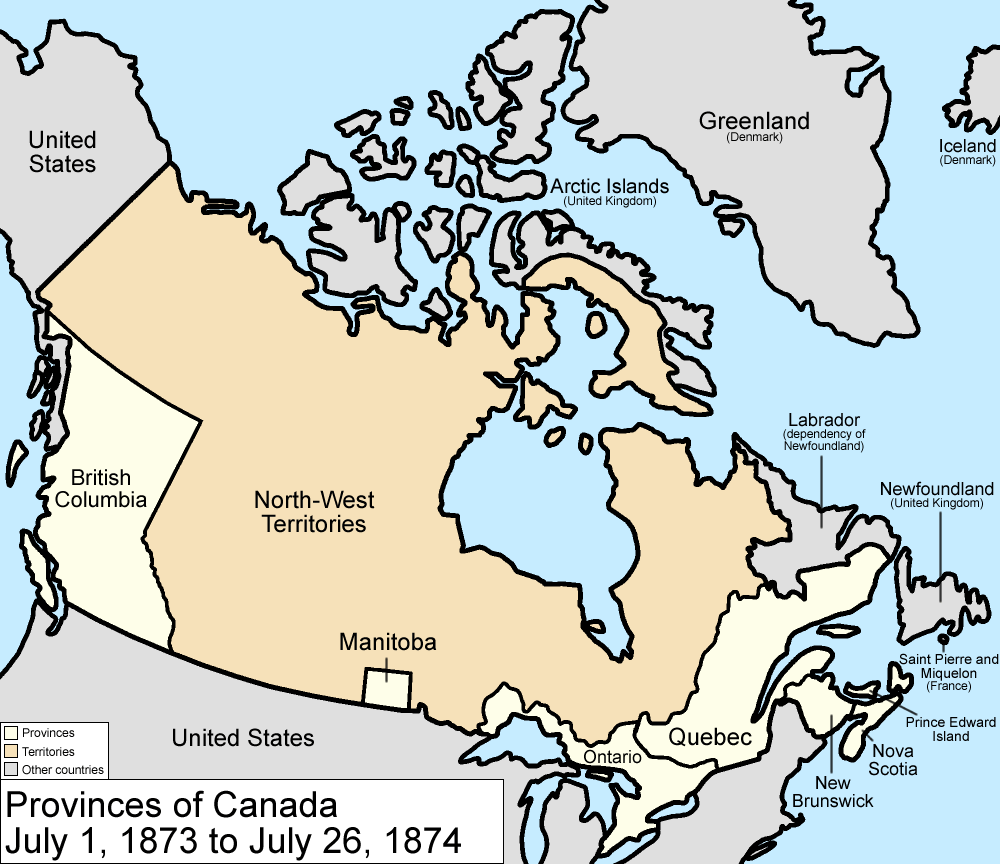
Canada, when Prince Edward Island joined the Confederation in 1873.

== Representation and favoritism ==
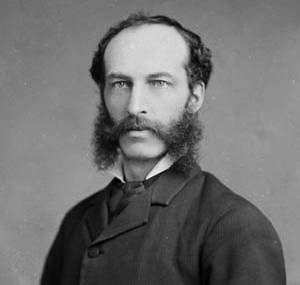
Pierre-Amand Landry.

Stanislas F. Perry became the first Acadian representative from Prince Edward Island in 1854. He later held the position of Speaker of the House from 1870 to 1874 before being elected to the new Canadian House of Commons, becoming the first Acadian Liberal Member of Parliament. He returned to provincial politics in 1879 and then to federal politics again in 1887. By the end of his career, he was accused of failing to defend Acadian interests and frequently changing his stance.

Fidèle Gaudet, elected in 1858, and Joseph-Octave Arsenault, elected in 1867, were two other Acadian provincial representatives. Arsenault, who transitioned from the Liberal to the Conservative party, was highly regarded and became a senator in 1895.

In Nova Scotia, noteworthy provincial representatives included Henry Martell and especially Isidore Leblanc, the first Acadian to become a minister.

In New Brunswick, seven Members of Parliament and one senator, including five Conservatives and two Liberals, represented the Acadians at the federal level, although none held ministerial positions. Auguste Renaud was elected in Kent in 1867, and Conservative Gilbert Girouard succeeded him from 1878 to 1883. Girouard was loyal to Prime Minister John A. Macdonald, and his main achievement was a railway line to Bouctouche.

Pierre-Amand Landry succeeded his father in provincial politics in 1870 and later replaced Girouard in 1883. He became the first Acadian to serve as a provincial minister and later as a judge.

Some individuals began to benefit from political favoritism, securing administrative positions in exchange for their support of the ruling party.

== Economy ==
Most Acadians continued to rely on subsistence farming. However, regional differences emerged. In Cape Breton and northeastern New Brunswick, farming was combined with fishing and forestry. In Madawaska and Prince Edward Island, farmers found it easier to sell their products, aided by the success of the Farmers' Bank of Rustico, established in 1859. On the Island, the main crops were oats and potatoes, though flax and Indian corn (maize) grew in popularity. In Madawaska, the production of wool, butter, pork, and poultry steadily increased. Generally, potatoes were produced in large quantities in New Brunswick and partially exported. While the number of agricultural societies increased, Acadian farming techniques evolved slowly, drawing criticism.

The forestry industry experienced unprecedented growth in the Acadian Peninsula after 1871 while continuing to develop in Madawaska. In Nova Scotia, forestry activities were concentrated in Clare, where shipbuilding was the primary market.

Several railway lines were constructed starting in 1850, including the Halifax–Truro line and the Saint John–Pointe-du-Chêne line. Many projects were linked to the forestry industry, with most investors being Anglophone. However, the railway created numerous jobs for Acadians and opened new opportunities for small entrepreneurs. Saint-Léonard became an important railway hub, situated near three rivers and a road. However, the settlement of surrounding lands and the expansion of the city and Madawaska were hindered by the grant of undeveloped lands to the New Brunswick Railway in 1878.

The revival of the fishing industry by American entrepreneurs coincided with a shortage of new farmland. Lobster, herring, and mackerel fishing increased starting in the 1870s. The lobster was canned for export to the United Kingdom, except in southwestern Nova Scotia, where it was sold live to the United States. Canning lobster involved less risk and investment. A few Acadians established canneries, employing many, including women and children. In northeastern New Brunswick and Nova Scotia, cod fishing continued to dominate the industry. However, with the advent of the railway, the sale of fresh cod replaced the market for dried or salted cod.

Some Acadians began investing in retail, with a few even opening small factories. One of the first Acadian merchants, Fidèle Poirier, opened a shop in Shediac in 1856 after spending five years as a peddler.

== Cultural and social development ==
François-Xavier Lafrance, a French Canadian priest, founded the first French-language higher education institution in Memramcook in 1854, the Saint-Thomas Seminary. It closed in 1862 but reopened two years later by the Congregation of Holy Cross, becoming the University of St. Joseph's College. In 1874, Father Marcel-François Richard founded the University of Saint-Louis in Saint-Louis-de-Kent, arguing that the University of St. Joseph's College was too bilingual. However, it closed in 1882 as Bishop Rogers deemed it inadequate for the Irish population.

A middle class began to form in the 1860s. While institutions like the University of St. Joseph's College and the University of Sainte-Anne contributed to educating an elite, Acadia developed at least four distinct elite groups. The most prominent were the clergy and professionals, such as lawyers, doctors, and notaries. Additionally, although Acadian farmers and merchants did not have the capital of their Anglophone counterparts, many succeeded in distinguishing themselves. Other notable social groups included fishermen with several sons or those owning schooners, which offered better returns than smaller boats. Wealth increased social status, and in some regions, this led to more intermarriages between Anglophones and the Acadian elite. Poorer villages, however, tended to maintain more egalitarian societies.

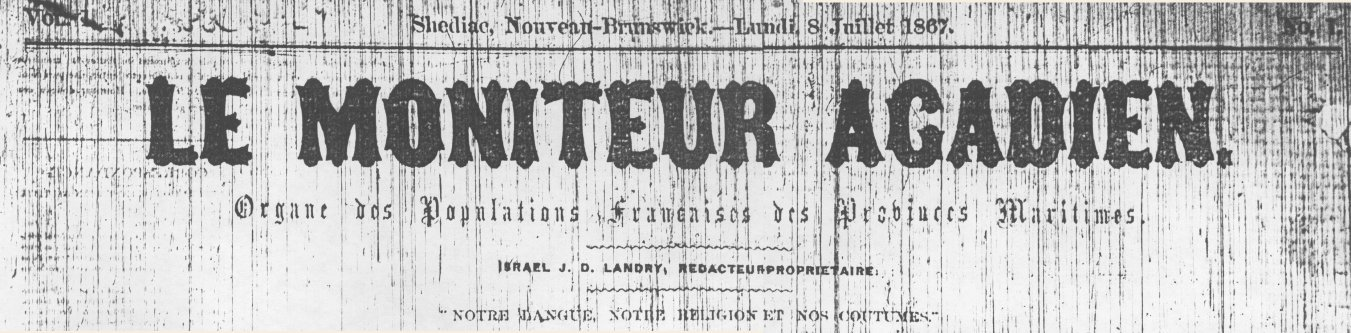
The masthead of the first issue of Le Moniteur Acadien.

The first French-language newspaper, Le Moniteur Acadien, was founded in 1867 in Shediac by French Canadian Israel Landry. Calls for an Acadian newspaper had been made by figures like historian François-Edme Rameau de Saint-Père. Despite three fires and financial difficulties, the paper served as a platform for emerging nationalism for many years. It supported the Conservative Party and defended the interests of the clergy and Francophones, though its editorial stance did not always align with Acadian elite views.

Under pressure from some deputies, the New Brunswick Legislative Assembly's debates were translated into French in 1870, with support from Le Moniteur Acadien. However, this practice ended that same year due to claimed budget cuts. The unilingual English practices in some government departments and the justice system were criticized, along with the lack of bilingual census enumerators. Demands for greater use of French in municipal administration yielded no significant results.

Emigration to the United States accelerated around 1870, mainly among fishermen and those seeking factory work. Although emigration was heavily criticized, Acadians emigrated less than other Maritimers. Between 1871 and 1881, their population grew by 26% in New Brunswick and Nova Scotia, while it declined by 12% on the Island. The lack of space prompted groups of New Brunswick Acadians to establish new villages such as Colborne, Tétagouche, Paquetville, Saint-Isidore, Sainte-Marie-de-Kent, Acadieville, and Rogersville. Residents of Prince Edward Island contributed to founding Saint-Paul-de-Kent. The clergy encouraged this movement, hoping to focus Acadians on agriculture, avoiding the control of fishing companies, and preventing emigration.

French-language textbooks were nearly nonexistent in Nova Scotia and Prince Edward Island. In New Brunswick, some French books were approved starting in 1852, but most schoolbooks were bilingual. After 1877, Prince Edward Island mandated all textbooks be either English or bilingual, except for reading books.

Nova Scotia adopted the Tupper Law in 1864, establishing an English-only education system. New Brunswick and Prince Edward Island introduced similar laws in 1871 and 1877, respectively. While New Brunswick's law had positive aspects like free education, new schools, and teacher certification, it banned catechism teaching, and religious symbols, and required religious teachers to obtain certifications. It also required parents of private school children to pay public school taxes. Anglophones supported the law, while Catholics opposed it. Acadians refused to pay the school tax and took various steps to repeal the law. Tensions peaked in 1875 in Caraquet during the Louis Mailloux affair, where two people were killed. A compromise was later reached and accepted by Catholics.

=== The Convent and Hospital of Saint-Basile ===
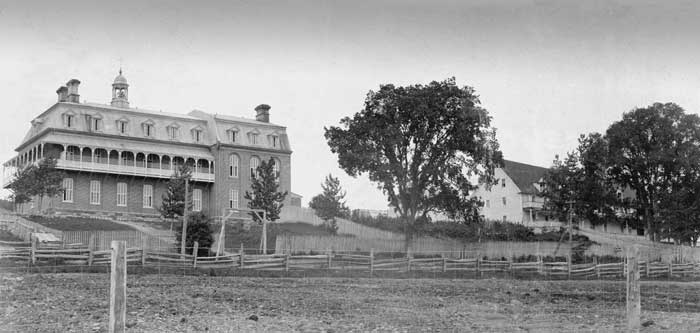
The convent and hospital of Saint-Basile.

Religious women's communities played a significant role in Acadia. The first convent was founded by Trappist nuns in Tracadie, Nova Scotia, in 1824. The Congregation of Notre-Dame de Montréal established convents in Arichat in 1856, Miscouche in 1864, Caraquet and Saint-Louis-de-Kent in 1874, and Rustico in 1882. The Sisters of Charity opened a convent in Saint-Basile in 1862 but left in 1873. A year later, the Religious Hospitallers opened another convent in the same town. Some criticized the increasing role of women in society. Between 1868 and 1881, the Sisters of Saint Joseph established hospitals in Tracadie, Chatham, Saint-Basile, and Campbellton. This period concludes with the first Acadian National Convention in 1881.

== See also ==
- Acadian folklore
- History of the Acadians
- Acadian diaspora
- Religion in Acadia
- Acadian cinema
- Société Nationale de l'Acadie
