= The Devil at the Dance =

French-Canadian legend

The Legend of Rose Latulipe, also known as The Legend of the Devil at the Dance and The Legend of the Beautiful Dancer, is a French Canadian legend (Quebecois and Acadian), from the 18th century. There are more than 200 different versions of the legend. The most well-known version was written by Philippe-Joseph Aubert de Gaspé, in 1837 in Le chercheur de trésor ou l'influence d'un livre.

This version recounts the story of Rose Latulipe, a young and frivolous girl who loved to dance. On the night of Mardi Gras, a stranger showed up at the Latulipe house and danced with Rose until the stroke of midnight. The stranger is revealed to be the Devil. According to some versions, the Devil disappeared, taking Rose with him to Hell. According to other versions, the priest of the village intervened, saving her. She would subsequently enter a convent and die a few years later.

The legend is one of many examples in French Canadian folklore of girls 'dancing with the devil.' The stories may have served as cautionary tales for young girls about the dangers of dancing with strangers who could be criminals, particularly during Lent or on Sundays.

== See also ==
- 1976 : Jeanne Demers and Lise Gauvin, « Documents : cinq versions de "Rose Latulipe" », Études françaises, vol. 12, n° 1–2, 1976, p. 25-50.
- 2013 : L'ensorceleuse de Pointe-Lévy, roman de Sébastien Chartrand
