= Acadian diaspora =

Acadian communities residing outside the territory of Canada

Map of the Acadian diaspora.

The Acadian diaspora is a term used to designate the various Acadian communities residing outside Canada's Maritime Provinces.

== History ==
The Acadians are descendants of 17th and 18th-century French settlers from southwestern France, primarily in the region historically known as Occitania. They established communities in Acadia, a northeastern area of North America, encompassing present-day Canadian Maritime Provinces (New Brunswick, Nova Scotia, and Prince Edward Island), parts of Québec, and southern Maine. Some Acadians also have Indigenous ancestry, and assimilation over time has diversified their ethnic roots.

Acadian history was shaped by six colonial wars during the 17th and 18th centuries, culminating in the French and Indian War. This conflict led to the British Expulsion of the Acadians, forcing many into hiding or exile. Some returned to Acadia post-war, while others settled in France or migrated to Louisiana, where they became known as Cajuns.

In the 19th century, the Acadian Renaissance, spurred by cultural works like Evangeline, revived their identity. Over the past century, Acadians have made significant strides in advocating for equal language and cultural rights as a minority group in Canada's Maritime Provinces.

=== French regime ===
Acadia was founded in 1604 by Pierre Dugua de Mons. In its heyday, Acadia comprised the coastline between the Pentagouet (Penobscot) River in the southeast and Gaspé in the north. Today, this territory includes mainland Nova Scotia, part of Quebec, most of New Brunswick, and eastern Maine. Acadian settlements developed from Port-Royal, founded in 1605, around the Bay of Fundy, particularly to the east. The Acadians preferred marshy terrain, which they drained using dykes equipped with aboiteaux. In addition to the forts, several other settlements were founded in remote areas: Miscou, Miramichi, and Nipisiguit to the north, and Pentagouet to the west.

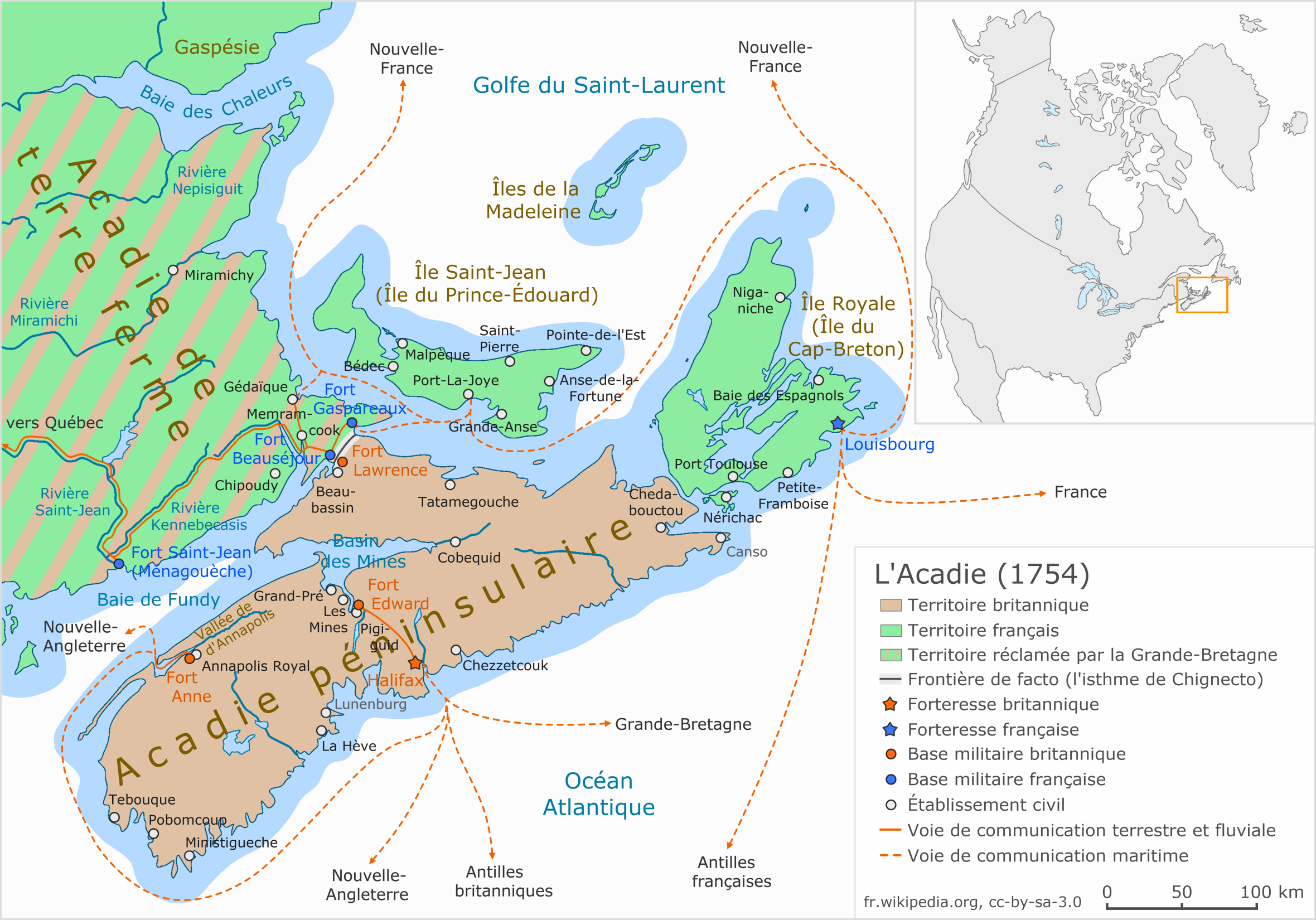
Acadia in 1754.

=== British regime ===
Acadia, renamed Nova Scotia, was ceded to the United Kingdom in 1713 by the Treaty of Utrecht. This treaty, softened by a letter from Queen Anne, allowed the Acadians to leave Nova Scotia unconditionally. At the same time, France tried to lure them to Île Royale, which had replaced Placentia as the center of French trade in the Gulf of St. Lawrence, and to Île Saint-Jean, which was to serve as an agricultural colony. Most of the Acadians decided to stay put, given the difficult living conditions on both islands. The English, on the other hand, were still few and far between in Nova Scotia, and tried to prevent the Acadians from leaving, as there were no English farmers yet. They feared that the Acadians' trade connections would contribute to the power of Île Royale. Moreover, the French quickly changed their strategy, assuming that the Acadians would prevent British colonization if they stayed in Nova Scotia.

The French built the fortress of Louisbourg on Île Royale from 1720 onwards, consolidating their control over the region at the same time as significant immigration from France and Newfoundland swelled the island's population. During the War of the Austrian Succession, the French tried unsuccessfully to retake Nova Scotia. The British took Louisbourg in 1745. A major French military expedition attempted to retake Nova Scotia in 1746, but a storm killed half the men and scattered the ships. An overland expedition did recapture Les Mines in 1746 but was quickly expelled by the British.

In 1748, the Treaty of Aix-la-Chapelle gave Île Saint-Jean and Île Royale back to France, which the British considered an affront. The British decided to change their strategy and end the French presence, including the Acadians. In 1749, 2,000 settlers founded Halifax. For some time, the Acadians maintained a neutral attitude, and their exodus continued towards the regions bordering New France. The British still tried to make them swear allegiance and, in 1761, the French declared any Acadian who refused to swear allegiance to the King of France to be a rebel. Between 1751 and 1754, the two powers built several forts in preparation for war.

=== Deportation of the Acadians ===
In 1755, Nova Scotia Governor Charles Lawrence had Fort Beauséjour taken from the French, and the Deportation of the Acadians began. Until 1763, the territories bordering Nova Scotia were annexed and the Acadians were deported to New England. Many others managed to escape to Canada, Île Saint-Jean (now Prince Edward Island), or hid among the Amerindians. Several colonies refused these prisoners, who were then deported to England or brought back to Nova Scotia. Île Saint-Jean was almost emptied of its population in 1758. Two-thirds were deported to France, while the rest took refuge in Restigouche or Canada. Refugees from England were expatriated to France in 1763. Some Acadians took refuge in Saint Pierre and Miquelon, but almost all were deported in 1778. More than half of the Acadians died during this period.

=== Acadia genealogy ===
After the signing of the Treaty of Paris in 1763, the Acadians moved to the Antilles, France, Louisiana, and the province of Quebec, but mainly to Nova Scotia. 12,000 immigrants from New England had already settled in the former Acadian villages, and the law forbade Acadians from settling in communities that were too large. They then had the option of settling on certain lands reserved for them among the English-speaking population, or of founding new villages in the remote corners of former Acadia - Cape Breton Island, Prince Edward Island, or the territory that would become New Brunswick in 1784 - which most did. Of all the former villages in the heart of Acadia, the only ones not reserved for English speakers were Pobomcoup and the left bank of the Trois-Rivières as well as Beaubassin, although the latter received very few Acadians. The exiles gradually settled in Halifax and along the Strait of Canso, then from 1767 in Baie-Saint-Marie, Tousquet, and Pobomcoup, and from 1780 in Chéticamp and Margaree.

Nearly two-thirds of the Acadians in France went to Louisiana in 1785.

A group of Acadians from Saint-Malo settled in the Falkland Islands in 1764. Most left the archipelago in the following years, but a few families appear to have left descendants on these islands, as well as in Montevideo, the capital of Uruguay.

Starting in 1785, Madawaska saw the arrival of Acadians, who had left the lower St. John River valley to the Loyalists. By the end of the 18th century, 36% of Acadians had settled in the Maritime Provinces, and their return from exile continued until 1820. Until the second half of the 20th century, Maritime settlements spread along the coast and inland. Several factors contributed to population movements, but the most constant was the religious presence. The construction of a chapel or the establishment of a priest generally meant that a community was established for good. During this period, the arrival of numerous British immigrants accentuated the minority status of the Acadians.

In the second half of the 20th century, Acadian communities sprang up in Alberta and Labrador. They are mainly made up of workers attracted by the many well-paid jobs in the primary sector. This exodus threatens the survival of some Maritime communities.

== Situation since the 20th century ==
In addition to the 500,000 Acadians in the Atlantic provinces, there were 1 million Acadians in Louisiana, 1 million in New England, 1 million in Quebec, and probably 300,000 in France, for a total of at least 3.8 million worldwide.

Some thirty towns and regions almost everywhere in Quebec can be considered Cadies. Many of these communities are no longer Acadian in culture today and that Acadians were sometimes only transient in some of them. In the United States, there are Acadian communities north of Maine (Madawaska), as well as significant minorities in several New England towns and Florida. Cajuns are present in southwest Louisiana (Acadiana) and southeast Texas (Beaumont, Port Arthur). Finally, there is a significant minority in the Los Angeles area. In France, they include Saint Pierre and Miquelon, French Guiana, Belle-Île-en-Mer in Brittany, La Ligne Acadienne (The Acadian Line) in Poitou-Charentes (located in four communes: Cenan, Archigny, St Pierre de Maillé, and Bonneuil-Matours) and a minority in Nantes and Saint-Malo.

In Maine, 5.28% of the population speak French at home, but not all are Acadian. In Louisiana, the rate is 4.68%, although here too, Cajuns, Creoles, Houmas, and Chitimachas should not be confused. In Maine, French is in decline among people under the age of 30, where the rate of Francophones fell by 18% between 1971 and 1987. The precarious situation of French in Maine can be explained by the fact that French was banned from schools between 1910 and 1960.

== In the popular culture ==
Several recent films by Acadian filmmaker Phil Comeau explore deportations and the global Acadian diaspora, including Quebec's "Les Acadiens du Québec, avec Fred Pellerin" (2011), that of Louisiana with the film "Zachary Richard, toujours batailleur" (2016), and that of France with the three films "Belle-Ile-en-Mer, île bretonne et acadienne" (2016), "Belle-Ile en Acadie" (2019) and "Racines, diaspora & guerre" (2023).

== See also ==
- History of the Acadians
- Acadian Renaissance
- Acadian folklore
- Acadian theatre
- Société Nationale de l'Acadie

== Bibliography ==
- Landry, Nicolas; Lang, Nicole (2001). Histoire de l'Acadie. Sillery: Les éditions du Septentrion. ISBN 2-89448-177-2.
