= Société Nationale de l'Acadie =

International non-governmental organization

Société nationale de l'Acadie
- Founded: 1881
- Type: Federation of associations
- Headquarters: Moncton, Acadia
- Region served: Acadia
- President: Martin Théberge
- Website: snacadie.org

The Société Nationale de l'Acadie (SNA), originally named the Société Nationale de l'Assomption, is an international non-governmental organization that federates various Acadian associations. Its mission is to promote and defend the rights and interests of the Acadian people in Atlantic Canada. The SNA has held consultative status with the Organisation Internationale de la Francophonie since 2005. Its motto is "The strength of a people."

== History ==
=== Origins ===
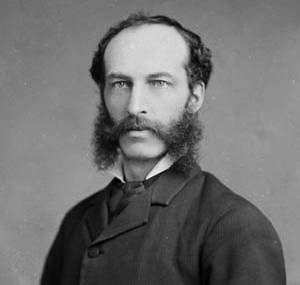
Pierre-Amand Landry, a prominent leader of the Acadian elite in the 19th century.

In its early days, Acadia lacked formal associations, but public assemblies and elected officials, such as those responsible for aboiteaus, churchwardens, syndics, and militia officers, played significant roles. Following the British conquest in 1710, Acadians were barred from serving as militia officers, but a system of elected representatives was established in the 1720s. By 1755, approximately 100 such representatives held significant societal roles. The expulsion of the Acadians (1755–1763) disrupted this structure, yet Acadians continued to gather and advocate for their rights in their places of exile. Those who remained in or returned to Acadia continued electing churchwardens.

In the early 19th century, confraternities, educational societies, agricultural organizations, and various community and economic groups emerged. The involvement of the clergy, French scholar François-Edme Rameau de Saint-Père, the establishment of the first Acadian colleges, and the founding of the newspaper Le Moniteur Acadien in 1867 boosted the popularity of these organizations. Acadians also participated in local governance, with Simon d'Entremont becoming the first Acadian elected as a deputy in 1836.

During the 1870s, Acadia experienced a renaissance, with a political elite forming under the leadership of Pierre-Amand Landry. Unlike Quebec's Société Saint-Jean-Baptiste, founded in 1734 by Ludger Duvernay, Acadia lacked ethnic or nationalist organizations at the time. In 1874, the first General Convention of French Canadians attracted thousands of North American Francophones, including three Acadians: Dr. Boissy, Pascal Poirier, and Pierre-Amand Landry. Landry participated in discussions, addressing the New Brunswick Schools Question. He was also part of the organizing committee for the French-Canadian Union of America, which ultimately did not materialize.

In 1880, Landry, supported by Pascal Poirier, led a delegation of nearly 100 Acadians to the second General Convention of French Canadians in Quebec City. A dedicated Acadian commission was established, and organizers warmly welcomed the Acadians, advocating for a shared Francophone North American identity, including the adoption of Saint-Jean-Baptiste celebrations outside Quebec. However, Landry criticized the paternalistic attitude of French Canadians toward Acadians in a speech. This led Acadian delegates to organize the First Acadian National Convention in Memramcook in 1881.

=== Founding controversy ===
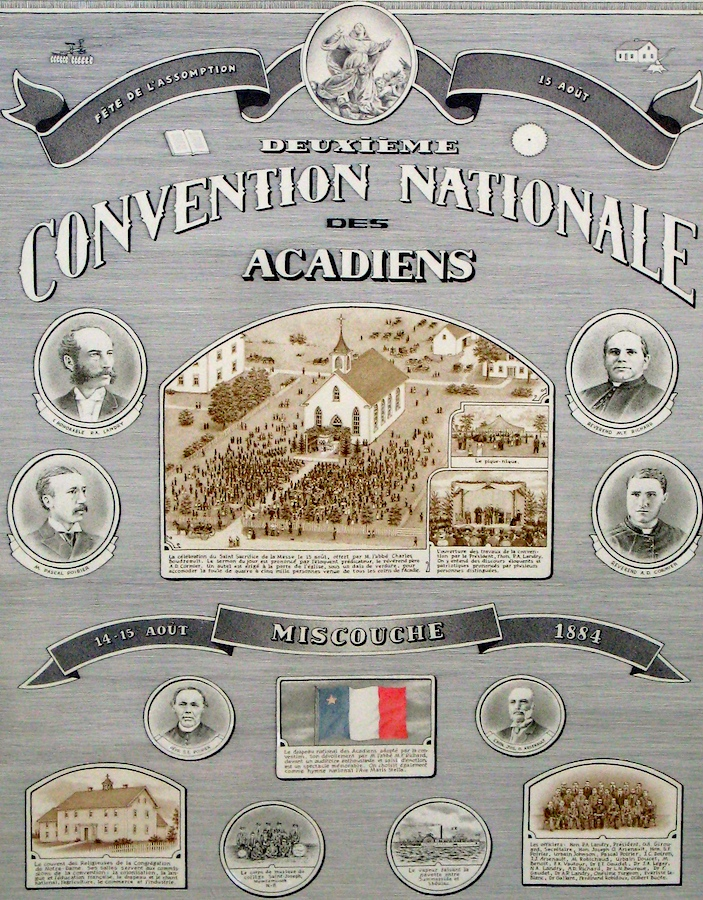
Poster announcing the Second Acadian National Convention.

According to tradition, the Société Nationale de l'Acadie was founded in July 1881 during the First Acadian National Convention in Memramcook. However, no definitive evidence supports this claim, unlike the well-documented debates of the convention. The Second Acadian National Convention in Miscouche in 1884 also makes no mention of the organization's founding. Fernand Robidoux's 1907 compilation of convention documents does not reference the SNA's creation. A handwritten note by Clément Cormier in the SNA archives suggests an 1881 founding in Memramcook but acknowledges the lack of evidence. Cormier later revised his view in a 1965 SNA history, claiming a later founding date. Robidoux's work references the Third Acadian National Convention in Pointe-de-l'Église in 1890, where delegates formalized the organization's structure. Historian Pascal Poirier also stated that the society did not exist in 1890. Historians Gérard Beaulieu and Maurice Basque assert the SNA was established at the 1890 Pointe-de-l'Église convention, while Richard Wilbur claims it was founded in 1889 to organize that event. The earliest documented mention of the Société de l'Assomption, the SNA's original name, dates to 1890.

Several events contribute to this confusion. A committee chaired by Pierre-Amand Landry was formed in Shediac on May 10, 1881, to organize the first national convention. The Société acadienne Saint-François-Xavier was founded in Moncton in 1884, and the Société des Acadiens Français was established in Boston in 1888. Local Société de l'Assomption groups were created in 1881 to promote the August 15 national holiday. Maurice Basque suggests one such group likely organized the 1883 Bouctouche celebration, where a committee selected the venue for the second convention. A General Assumption Committee, responsible for organizing conventions, was chosen in Miscouche in 1884. An August 2, 1889, article in Le Moniteur acadien called for a "Société générale de l'Assomption" modeled on the Société Saint-Jean-Baptiste. At the 1889 Moncton meeting of the General Assumption Committee, Marcel-François Richard proposed a third General Assumption Convention, a term not used for the prior two conventions.

The Société de l'Assomption should not be confused with the Société Mutuelle l'Assomption, now known as Assomption Vie, founded in 1903 in Waltham, Massachusetts. Adding to the confusion, several leaders were involved in both organizations, which initially shared similar goals, and a merger was even proposed. Between the 1930s and 1950s, the mutual society was more active, and the media often used "Société l'Assomption" interchangeably for both.

=== Nationalist period ===
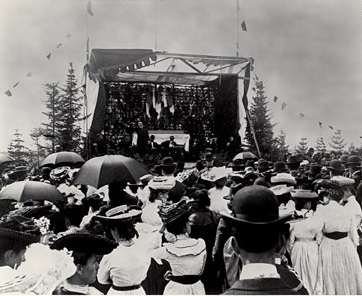
The Fifth Acadian National Convention.

Historian Deborah Robichaud argues that the SNA's structure evolved directly from its organizing committees. Georges Beaulieu suggests it was inspired by the Société Saint-Jean-Baptiste.

A key achievement of the Société de l'Assomption was organizing eight Acadian national conventions between 1900 and 1937. Pascal Poirier was elected its first president in 1890, with Pierre-Amand Landry as the first secretary. Meetings were held at Collège Saint-Joseph in Memramcook. The Fourth Acadian National Convention in Arichat in 1900 was attended by Prime Ministers Wilfrid Laurier and George Henry Murray. Delegates discussed the "Acadianization" of the clergy, the appointment of an Acadian bishop, and the need for newspapers to collaborate in defending Acadian interests. The promotion of French-language education in Nova Scotia was a major focus, as reported in newspapers. Poirier and Landry actively lobbied the clergy and the Vatican for an Acadian bishop, straining relations with Atlantic Canada's bishops. Poirier resigned in 1904 as a result.

Dr. François-Xavier Comeau became president in 1904, notable as the first leader not from southeastern New Brunswick, likely chosen because the Fifth Acadian National Convention was held in his hometown of Caraquet in 1905. Bishop Thomas Barry declined to attend if Poirier was present, but Poirier attended and delivered a speech criticizing the Anglophone clergy. Delegates reiterated demands for an Acadian bishop, government support for farmers, French in teacher training schools, and greater Acadian involvement in commerce and industry. Ties were also established with the Société Mutuelle l'Assomption, founded two years earlier.

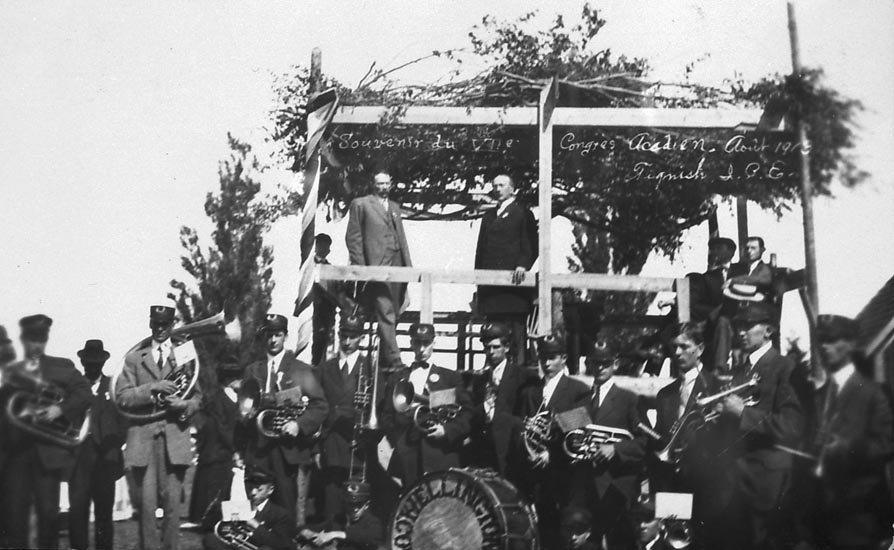
The Seventh Acadian National Convention.

Cyprien Martin, a deputy, became the third president in 1905. The Sixth Acadian National Convention was held in his hometown of Saint-Basile in 1908, attended by 5,000 people, including Louisiana's Chief Justice Joseph Breaux. Emphasis was placed on ties with the Acadian diaspora. Delegates urged newspapers to publish at least one in-depth article weekly, reduce foreign content, and encourage local writers, while again requesting an Acadian bishop.

François-Joseph Buote, an editor from Tignish, became the fourth president in 1908. The Seventh Acadian National Convention in Tignish in 1913 was delayed a year due to church renovations and the appointment of an Acadian bishop, resembling a Thanksgiving celebration. A repatriation, colonization, and agriculture committee was formed, and the future of the Société Mutuelle l'Assomption was discussed.

Pascal Poirier returned as president in 1913. Formal minutes were introduced by secretary-general Charles Hébert. The Société Saint-Thomas-d'Aquin was founded in Prince Edward Island in 1919, the first provincial Acadian association. The Eighth Acadian National Convention was held in Pointe-de-l'Église and Grand-Pré. Poirier, often replaced by David-Vital Landry due to illness, oversaw demands to correct historical inaccuracies about Acadians in textbooks. A history commission, led by historian Placide Gaudet, was established. Delegates encouraged subscriptions to local newspapers. The Société Nationale l'Assomption adopted a constitution, with a president, three vice-presidents, a secretary, an assistant secretary, a treasurer, a legal advisor, a general auditor, nine directors, and a chaplain, elected by convention executive committees. All Acadians were automatic members, but only lifetime or active members could run for office. Delegates visited the recently purchased Grand-Pré National Historic Site and planned a memorial church.

Judge Aubin-Edmond Arsenault, former Prince Edward Island premier and the first Acadian in such a role, became the sixth president in 1921; his father, Joseph-Octave Arsenault, had formalized the society in 1890. In 1925, he led the first official mission to Louisiana. The Ninth Acadian National Convention in Moncton in 1927 called for greater Acadian political representation in New Brunswick, cooperative membership, and French in public life. UK Prime Minister Stanley Baldwin and Canadian Prime Minister William Lyon Mackenzie King attended.

New Brunswick judge Arthur Leblanc became the seventh president in 1927.

The SNA claims to represent all Acadians but was primarily led by an elite defending their own interests, according to Maurice Basque. Léon Thériault views it as a quasi-government in its rhetoric. It significantly advanced Acadian interests compared to government efforts. Key initiatives included advocating for the 1912 appointment of the first Acadian bishop, Alfred-Édouard Leblanc, and promoting French-language education at all conventions.

=== Decline ===
On June 22, 1957, during the Twelfth Acadian National Convention in Memramcook, the organization adopted the name Société Nationale des Acadiens.

=== Renewal ===
The organization officially adopted its current name, Société Nationale de l'Acadie, on May 23, 1992, during its first Annual General Meeting in Newfoundland and Labrador.

== Organization ==
The SNA is a federation overseeing several Acadian associations across Atlantic Canada and beyond.

New Brunswick

- Société de l'Acadie du Nouveau-Brunswick (SANB, English: Acadian Society of New Brunswick)
- Fédération des jeunes francophones du Nouveau-Brunswick (FJFNB, English: Federation of Young Francophones of New Brunswick)

Nova Scotia

- Fédération acadienne de la Nouvelle-Écosse (FANE, English: Acadian Federation of Nova Scotia)
- Conseil Jeunesse Provincial (CJP, English: Provincial Youth Council)

Prince Edward Island

- Société Saint-Thomas d'Aquin (SSTA, English: Society of Saint Thomas Aquinas)
- Jeunesse Acadienne (JA, English: Acadian Youth)

Newfoundland and Labrador

- Fédération des francophones de Terre-Neuve et du Labrador (FFTNL, English: Federation of Francophones of Newfoundland and Labrador)
- Les Franco-Jeunes de Terre-Neuve et du Labrador (FJTNL, English: The Franco-Youth of Newfoundland and Labrador)

Quebec

- Coalition des organisations acadiennes du Québec (English: Coalition of Acadian Organizations of Quebec)
- La Corporation des Acadiens aux Îles-de-la-Madeleine (English: The Corporation of Acadians in the Magdalen Islands)

France

- Les Amitiés Acadiennes (English: Acadian Friendship)
- L'Association Saint-Pierre-et-Miquelon/Acadie (English: Association Saint-Pierre-et-Miquelon/Acadie)

United States

- Le Comité Louisiana-Acadie (English: The Louisiana-Acadie Committee)
- Le Conseil d'héritage acadien du Maine (English: Maine Acadian Heritage Council)

Atlantic Canada

- Fédération des Associations de Familles Acadiennes (English: Federation of Acadian Family Associations)

== International relations ==
The SNA maintains both informal and official international relationships, with the most significant and longstanding ties being with France. These began in 1968 at the SNA's initiative. France relocated its chancery from Halifax to Moncton in 1964, upgrading it to a consulate general in 1966. The France-Acadie cooperation agreement, renewed biennially, includes exchange programs, scholarships, and financial and technical support. The SNA manages the Franco-Acadian Foundation for Youth, promoting youth exchanges, while France established a Cultural Service at its Moncton consulate. Relations with the French Community of Belgium began in 1983, with a triennial exchange program. Since the 1990s, discussions with Saint Pierre and Miquelon's Conseil général led to a 2001 agreement and the founding of the Association SPM-Acadie, later replaced by Association Miquelon Culture. Ties with CODOFIL in Louisiana also started in the 1990s. Since 1995, Quebec has sought closer ties with Canadian Francophones. In 2002, a monument recognizing Acadian contributions was unveiled in Quebec City. In 2003, Quebec's National Assembly unanimously supported the SNA's efforts to acknowledge the wrongs of the Expulsion of the Acadians. The Centre de la francophonie des Amériques was established in 2008, and an Acadie-Québec Commission exists. Since 2005, the SNA has participated in the International Organisation of La Francophonie as part of Canada's delegation.

== Awards ==
The SNA and its affiliates present awards such as the Léger-Comeau Medal, the Camille-Antoine-Richard Medal, the France-Acadie Prize, the Acadie-Québec Prize, and the Marguerite-Maillet Prize.

== Presidents ==
List of Presidents of the Société Nationale de l'Acadie
Rank	Name	Tenure
1st	Pascal Poirier	1890–1904, 1913–1921
2nd	Dr. François-Xavier Comeau	1904–1905
3rd	Cyprien Martin	1905–1908
4th	François-Joseph Buote	1908–1913
5th	Aubin-Edmond Arsenault	1921–1927
6th	Arthur Leblanc	1927–1937
7th	François Grégoire Justinien Comeau	1937–1945
8th	Joseph-Henri Blanchard	1945–1950
9th	Dr. Georges Dumont	1950–1956
10th	Gilbert Finn	1956–1957
11th	Martin J. Légère	1957–1958
12th	Louis Lebel	1958–1964
13th	Dr. Léon Richard	1964–1969
14th	Victor Godbout	1969–1974
15th	Michel Bastarache	1974–1977
16th	Fernand Landry	1977–1978
17th	Père Léger Comeau	1978–1988
18th	Pierre Arsenault	1988–1991
19th	Roger Ouellette	1991–1995
20th	Liane Roy	1995–1998
21st	Yvette Finn	1998–1999
22nd	Neil Boucher	1999–2000
23rd	Euclide Chiasson	2000–2004
24th	Michel Cyr	2004–2006
25th	Françoise Enguehard	2006–2012
26th	René Légère	2012–2015
27th	René Cormier	2015–2016
28th	Xavier Lord-Giroux	2016–2017
29th	Louise Imbeault	2017–2021
30th	Martin Théberge	2021–present

== See also ==
- Acadian World Congress
- Acadian Renaissance
- Deportation of the Acadians
- Francophonie in Minnesota

== Bibliography ==
- Basque, Maurice (2006). La Société nationale de l'Acadie: au cœur de la réussite d'un peuple [The National Acadian Society: At the Heart of a People's Success] (in French). Moncton: Les Éditions de la Francophonie. p. 265. ISBN 2-89627-047-7.
