= Acadian cinema =

Films created by Acadians

Acadian cinema refers to cinema created by Acadians, primarily in Atlantic Canada. (Note: Acadia roughly encompasses the northern and eastern regions of the Canadian province of New Brunswick, as well as smaller communities in Prince Edward Island, Newfoundland and Labrador, and Nova Scotia. Broadly, Acadia also includes Acadian diaspora communities in Quebec, the United States, France, the Falkland Islands, and the Caribbean. While not officially recognized, Acadia forms a nation through its language, culture, institutions, and symbols.) Acadians are a Francophone minority in the predominantly English-speaking Maritime provinces, though they form the majority in key Acadian regions where French is the primary language of daily life.

== History ==
=== Early appearances on screen ===
The earliest film to depict Acadians was the 1907 American production An Arcadian Elopement, which portrayed Acadia as a mythical promised land. Between 1908 and 1929, six film adaptations of Evangeline, a poem by Henry Wadsworth Longfellow inspired by the Deportation of the Acadians, were produced. Notably, the 1913 film Evangeline (1913 film) became the first Canadian feature film. Acadian brothers Joseph De Grasse and Sam De Grasse were pioneers of early American cinema in the 1910s.

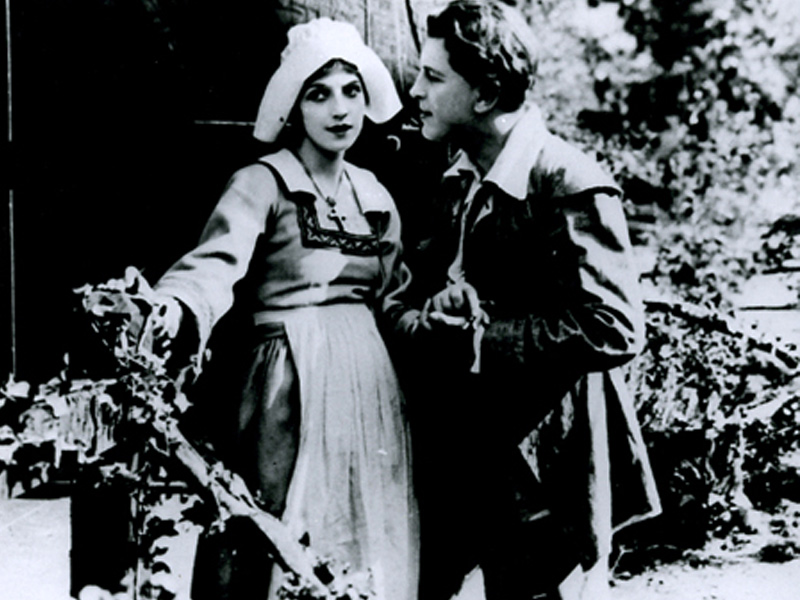
Scene from Evangeline (1913).

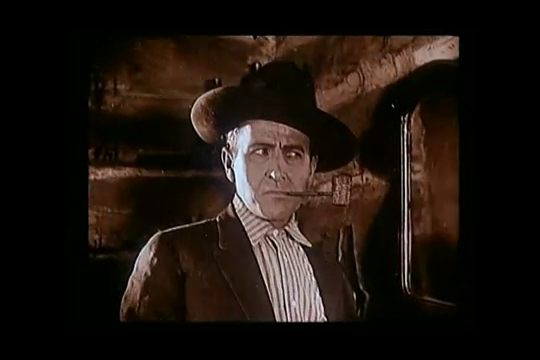
Sam De Grasse in Heart o' the Hills (1919).

In 1947, the National Film Board of Canada (NFB) co-produced the short film The Acadians, a series of picturesque scenes later criticized as a "masterpiece of colonial condescension." The 1948 documentary Louisiana Story by American filmmaker Robert Flaherty was the first to portray Acadians without colonial myths or biases. In 1950, the NFB produced Coup d'œil, focusing on Acadian hooked rugs. The 1952 short film Voix d'Acadie by Quebec filmmaker Roger Blais, also produced by the NFB, documented the choir of Collège Saint-Joseph, offering an authentic glimpse into Acadian culture. Quebec filmmakers Michel Brault and Pierre Perrault further elevated Acadian representation with their 1971 documentary Acadia, Acadia (L'Acadie, L'Acadie?!?), which captured student movements at the Université de Moncton from 1968 to 1969 and marked a surge in Acadian national pride. Similarly, the 1969 film Éloge du chiac explored the Chiac dialect through a teacher's discussion with her students.

=== Establishment of Acadian cinema ===
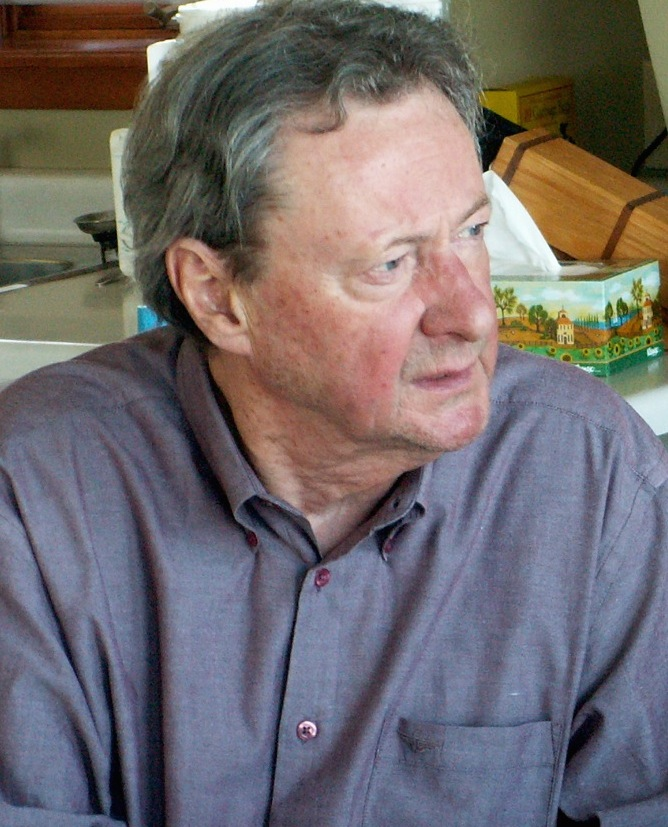
Léonard Forest

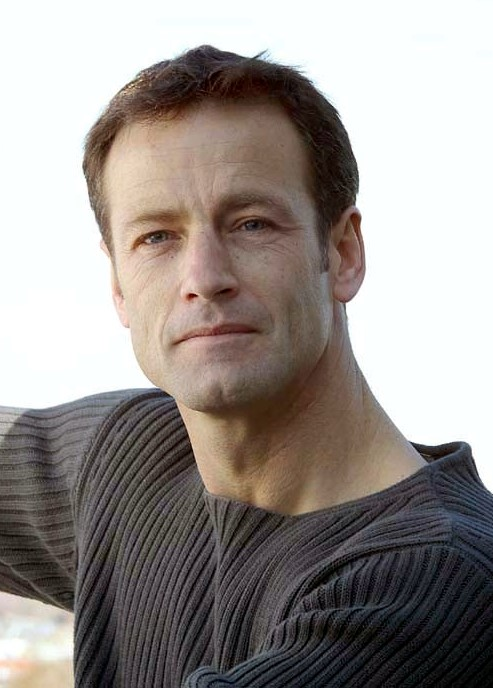
Phil Comeau

Acadian filmmaker Léonard Forest, born in Massachusetts to parents from Moncton, joined the NFB in 1953. Over three decades, he produced 60 films and directed 12, six of which focused on Acadia, earning him recognition as one of its most lyrical poets. Inspired by Italian neorealism and filmmakers like Robert Flaherty, Forest viewed documentaries as integral to the evolution of Acadian thought. In 1954, he contributed to La femme de Ménage, directed by Roger Blais and based on Anne Hébert’s novel. The 1955 documentary Les Aboiteaux, scripted by Forest and directed by Blais, is considered the true beginning of Acadian cinema, blending documentary and fiction. Forest's 1956 film Les Pêcheurs de Pomcoup, the first maritime documentary, portrayed swordfish fishermen with a mystical yet realistic tone. His 1969 short film Acadie Libre, inspired by Charles de Gaulle’s 1967 Vive le Québec libre! speech, addressed a 1966 symposium on Acadian socio-economic issues. His 1967 feature Les Acadiens de la Dispersion explored Acadian culture globally, resonating with younger audiences despite criticism from intellectuals. In 1971, Forest directed the experimental docu-fiction La Noce est pas finie, set in the fictional village of Lachigan, using fishermen as actors to depict Acadian cultural transformation. His final Acadian film, the 1972 documentary Un soleil pas comme ailleurs, highlighted Acadian resistance to government relocation efforts in the Acadian Peninsula.

In 1974, Forest established the NFB's Studio Acadie in Moncton, with a mandate to provide "an interpretation of Acadia by Acadians for Acadians and the world." The studio produced over 80 films and co-produced 20 with regional filmmakers, mostly documentaries, and offered summer training for film students. That same year, the NFB's French-language program was decentralized under the Régionalisation Acadie initiative, making Moncton a hub for Acadian cinema and marking the birth of sustained Acadian film production.

Between 1974 and 1980, Paul-Eugène LeBlanc produced 12 NFB films, including works by directors like Charles Thériault (Une simple journée), Luc Albert (Y a du bois dans ma cour), Anna Girouard (Abandounée), Claude Renaud (La Confession, Souvenir d’un écolier), Phil Comeau (La Cabane, Les Gossipeuses), Robert Haché (Au boutte du quai), and others. In 1981, Rhéal Drisdelle produced films by Denis Godin (Armand Plourde, une idée qui fait son chemin), Phil Comeau (J’avions 375 ans), and Denis Morissette (Arbres de Noël à vendre).

Private production initiatives also emerged in Moncton, Edmundston, and Caraquet, with filmmakers like Denis Godin, Phil Comeau, Rodolphe Caron, and Rodrigue Jean producing films through independent companies between 1977 and 1986. The first independent Acadian feature film, Le secret de Jérôme, co-written and directed by Phil Comeau, was released in 1994. Filmed in Caraquet, it was screened in about 20 theaters across Acadia and Quebec, marking the first French-language film shown in English-language cinemas in the Maritimes.

=== Acadian filmmakers ===
- Phil Comeau, born in Saulnierville, Nova Scotia, and based in Moncton and Montreal, is a prolific filmmaker with over 110 productions, including fiction, documentaries, and TV series, earning nearly 700 awards at Canadian and international festivals. His works have been broadcast on over 75 networks in nearly 200 countries, with some translated into 27 languages. Comeau began with theater and film clubs in high school, later studying dramatic arts at the Université de Moncton. His first fiction film, La Cabane (1977), explored adolescent challenges in an Acadian community, followed by the cult comedy Les Gossipeuses (1978). After the NFB's Moncton studio closed in 1980, Comeau founded Ciné-Baie and produced four documentaries while advocating for the studio's reopening. He briefly worked in Paris before settling in Montreal, where he directed the children's film Le Tapis de Grand-Pré (1985) and global series like Archeologie and Mayday. His 1994 film Jerome's Secret (Le Secret de Jérôme), inspired by a true story, won 15 awards and was screened at UNESCO in Paris. Other notable works include La Sagouine (2006), Les Acadiens du Québec (2011), and documentaries like Frédéric Back, grandeur nature (2012), Ron Turcotte, jockey légendaire (2013), and Zachary Richard, toujours batailleur (2016), which earned 20 awards and was presented at the United Nations in Geneva. His diaspora documentaries, such as Belle-Île-en-Mer, île bretonne et acadienne (2016), Belle-Île en Acadie (2019), and Racines, diaspora & guerre (2023), have garnered global acclaim, with the latter two setting a Guinness World Record for awards. Comeau has received the Order of Canada, the Order of New Brunswick, and France's Ordre des Arts et des Lettres.
- Rodolphe Caron, from Lac-Baker, New Brunswick, worked as a cinematographer on 11 films before directing three NFB documentaries. He co-founded Cinémarévie Coop Ltée in Edmundston, the only Acadian film production cooperative, aimed at training filmmakers in the Madawaska region. His documentaries include Le cœur (1994), about volunteers aiding hospital patients, and Le Champion (1996), profiling archer Hermel Volpé.
- Ginette Pellerin, originally from Trois-Rivières, Quebec, has been dedicated to Acadian filmmaking since moving to Moncton in 1975. She co-founded Phare-Est Inc. and directed three NFB films, including L’Âme sœur (1991), about the Hospitalières de Saint-Joseph, and Évangéline en quête (1996), a docudrama exploring the mythical and historical Evangeline.
- Herménégilde Chiasson, from Saint-Simon, New Brunswick, is a multidisciplinary artist and former Lieutenant Governor of New Brunswick. He co-founded Phare-Est and directed over a dozen films, including Le Grand Jack (1987), about Jack Kerouac, Robichaud (1989), on politician Louis J. Robichaud, and Les Années Noires (1995), about the Deportation of the Acadians.
- Anne-Marie Sirois, from Madawaska County, New Brunswick, is an animator and cartoonist who directed four animated films, including Maille Maille/Stitches in Time (1987) and Animastress (1994), addressing human stress through a satirical lens.
- Rodrigue Jean, from Caraquet, New Brunswick, directed feature films like Full Blast (1999), Yellowknife, and Lost Song (2008), which won Best Canadian Film at the Toronto International Film Festival.
- Renée Blanchar, also from Caraquet, directed Vocation Ménagère (1996), about housekeepers serving priests, and the TV series Belle-Baie for Radio-Canada.
- Jacques Savoie, from Edmundston, New Brunswick, directed Massabielle (1982), inspired by his novel about an expropriated Acadian, and wrote scripts for films like Les Portes tournantes (1988).
- Bettie Arseneault, from Charlo, New Brunswick, directed Bateau bleu, maison verte (1985) and De retour pour de bon (1994), exploring Acadian identity.
- Claudette Lajoie, from Grand-Sault, directed documentaries like Une sagesse ordinaire (1983), about midwife Édith Pinet, and Les Femmes aux filets (1987), about women in fish processing plants.
- Robert Awad, from Kedgwick, directed satirical films like Truck and The Bronswik Affair (1978).
- Monique LeBlanc, from Bouctouche, directed The Acadian Connection/Le Lien acadien (1995), exploring the LeBlanc family's diaspora ties.
- Dano LeBlanc, from Moncton, created the animated series Acadieman, adapted into the 2009 feature Acadieman vs. le C.M.A..
- Paul-Émile d'Entremont, from Halifax, Nova Scotia, has directed documentaries for Radio-Canada and RDI.
- Glen Pitre, from Cut Off, Louisiana, is the first Cajun Francophone filmmaker, directing Belisaire, le Cajun (1986).
- Other filmmakers include Julien Cadieux, Chris LeBlanc, Paul Bossé, Denise Bouchard, Fabien Melanson, Aube Giroux, Gilles Doiron, Marie Cadieux, and Emmanuelle Landry.

=== Distribution ===
Several francophone cinemas operate in Acadia, including Caraquet, Tracadie, Edmundston, and Grand-Sault. In Moncton, the Palais Crystal cinema reserved two screens for French-language films for several years.

== List of Acadian actors ==
- Philip Bourneuf
- Isabelle Cyr
- Joseph De Grasse
- Sam De Grasse
- Ryan Doucette
- Christian Essiambre
- Viola Léger
- René Lemieux
- Diane Losier
- Robert Maillet
- Gabriel Robichaud
- André Roy
- Marcel-Romain Thériault
- Marie-Jo Thério

== List of Acadian filmmakers ==
- Robert Awad
- Renée Blanchar
- Herménégilde Chiasson
- Phil Comeau
- Joseph De Grasse
- Gilles Doiron
- Paul-Émile d'Entremont
- Léonard Forest
- Rodrigue Jean
- Monique LeBlanc
- Jacques Savoie
- Anne-Marie Sirois

== List of Acadian feature films ==
=== Documentaries ===
- 1967: Les Acadiens de la Dispersion
- 1971: La Noce est pas finie
- 1971: Acadia, Acadia (L'Acadie, L'Acadie?!?) by Michel Brault and Pierre Perrault
- 1972: Un soleil pas comme ailleurs by Léonard Forest
- 1992: Acadie à venir by Herménégilde Chiasson
- 1995: Le lien acadien/The Acadian Connection by Monique LeBlanc
- 2005: Les chemins de Marie by Monique LeBlanc
- 2012: Frédéric Back, grandeur nature by Phil Comeau
- 2012: Une dernière chance by Paul-Émile d'Entremont
- 2013: Ron Turcotte, jockey légendaire by Phil Comeau
- 2014: Les héritiers du club by Renée Blanchar
- 2016: Simplement Viola by Rodolphe Caron
- 2016: Zachary Richard, toujours batailleur by Phil Comeau
- 2017: Shadow Men (Nos hommes dans l'ouest) by Renée Blanchar
- 2018: Modifié by Aube Giroux
- 2019: VAGUE D’ACADIE by Phil Comeau
- 2021: The Silence (Le Silence) by Renée Blanchar

=== Fiction ===
- 1994: Jerome's Secret (Le secret de Jérôme) by Phil Comeau
- 1999: Full Blast by Rodrigue Jean
- 2019: Pour mieux t’aimer by Denis Bouchard and Gilles Doiron

== Acadian film festival ==
- Festival international du cinéma francophone en Acadie

== See also ==
- Acadian culture
- Expulsion of the Acadians
- Chiac
- National Film Board of Canada
- Canadian cinema
- Italian neorealism
- Acadian Peninsula
- Université de Moncton
- Cajuns

== Bibliography ==
- Laurette, Patrick (1993). "Aspects historique de l'art en Acadie" [Historical Aspects of Art in Acadia]. In Daigle, Jean (ed.). L'Acadie des Maritimes [Acadia of the Maritimes] (in French). Moncton: Centre d'études acadiennes, Université de Moncton. pp. 789–844. ISBN 2921166062.
