= Anne-Marie Sirois =

Canadian film director and screenwriter

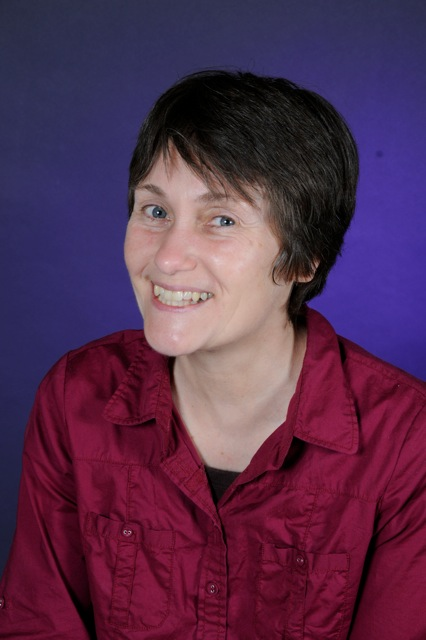

Anne-Marie Sirois (born 1958) is a visual artist, writer and film director of Acadian descent living in New Brunswick, Canada.

== Career ==
She was born in Saint-Basile and received a bachelor's degree in visual arts from the Université de Moncton. She attended animation workshops with the National Film Board of Canada and directed her first animated film Les joies de Noël in 1985.

In 1995, she published her first children's book Le Petit Chaperon Mauve. That was followed by Rose Neige et les six nains in 2000. Sirois has also illustrated story books and textbooks.

Sirois has created a number of sculptures which incorporate irons. These sculptures have been exhibited at various galleries in New Brunswick, Quebec and Ontario. In 2010, she published an art book Pourquoi 100 fers.

She has also done performance art in 2016 at the Aberdeen Cultural Centre titled Grille cheese, where she made grilled cheese sandwiches.

== Selected works ==
- Ma gribouille tigrée, children's book (2006)
- Pssst, short film (2003)
- Joséphine, National Film Board short (2000)
- Animastress, National Film Board short (1994)
- Maille, Maille, National Film Board short (1987)
- L'avertissement, short film (1986)
- Les joies de Noël, short film (1985)

== Awards ==
- Award of merit for L'Avertissement at the Atlantic Film Festival, 1986
- Award of excellence for Maille Maille at the Atlantic Film Festival, 1987
- Silver Apple Award for Maille Maille at the National Educational Film and Video Festival in Oakland, California, 1989
- Best Acadian film for Joséphine at the Festival international du cinéma francophone en Acadie, 2000
- Prix Éloize: Artist of the year in film video television from the Association acadienne des artistes professionnels du Nouveau-Brunswick, 2000 and 2004
- Prix Éloize: Artist of the year in visual arts, 2012
