= Aboiteau =

Tide gate or dam that prevents water from flooding into marshland

How the aboiteau works

Aboiteau farming on reclaimed marshland is a labour-intensive method in which earthen dikes are constructed to stop high tides from inundating marshland.

A wooden sluice or aboiteau (plural aboiteaux) is built into the dike, with a hinged door (clapper valve) that swings open at low tide to allow fresh water to drain from the farmland, but swings shut at high tide to prevent salt water from inundating the fields. After several years, the rainwater drained from the marsh eliminates the soil's salinity, making it suitable for farming.

Aboiteau farming is intimately linked with the story of French Acadian colonization of the shores of Canada's Bay of Fundy in the 17th and 18th centuries. The Acadians constructed earthen dikes to isolate areas of salt marsh from repeated inundation by the tides. Noted Acadian dikes include the diking of the tidal marshes at Grand-Pré (in contemporary Nova Scotia) in the early 1680s. Around 1755, 13,000 acres (5,300 ha) of salt marsh were reclaimed using this dike for pasturage and intensive agricultural production.

In the Kamouraska region of the St. Lawrence Valley of Quebec, aboiteau diking of salt marshes was closely tied to the modernization of agriculture in the 19th and early 20th centuries.

A rare original aboiteau is the jewel of the West Pubnico Acadian Museums' artifacts. In 1990, local residents found a couple of boards sticking out of an eroding beach on Double Island, West Pubnico. They returned to the site in 1996 to remove the aboiteau, to preserve and display it at the museum.

In summer 2023, during record-breaking wildfires, the government of Nova Scotia ordered the closing of an aboiteau at the Windsor causeway "to maximize the water supply available in the event of wildfires". The aboiteau's opening in March 2021 had caused nearby Lake Pisiquid to drain.
