= Kent (New Brunswick provincial electoral district, 1827–1974) =

Defunct provincial electoral district in New Brunswick, Canada

New Brunswick electoral district

Defunct provincial electoral district
- Legislature: Legislative Assembly of New Brunswick
- District created: 1827
- District abolished: 1973
- First contested: 1827
- Last contested: 1972

Kent was a provincial electoral district for the Legislative Assembly of New Brunswick, Canada. It used a bloc voting system to elect candidates. It was abolished with the 1973 electoral redistribution, when the province moved to single-member ridings.

== Members of the Legislative Assembly ==
| Legislature | Years | Member | Party | Member | Party | Member | Party |
|---|---|---|---|---|---|---|---|
Riding created from Northumberland
| 9th | 1827 – 1830 | John W. Weldon | Ind. | | | | |
| 10th | 1831 – 1834 | John W. Weldon | Ind. | | | | |
| 11th | 1835 – 1837 | John W. Weldon | Ind. | John P. Ford | Ind. | | |
| 12th | 1837 – 1842 | John W. Weldon | Ind. | David McAlmon | Ind. | | |
| 13th | 1843 – 1846 | John W. Weldon | Ind. | David Wark | Ind. | | |
| 14th | 1847 – 1850 | John W. Weldon | Ind. | David Wark | Ind. | | |
| 15th | 1851 – 1854 | Robert B. Cutler | Ind. | Francis McPhelim | Ind. | | |
| 16th | 1854 – 1856 | Robert B. Cutler | Ind. | Francis McPhelim | Ind. | | |
| 17th | 1856 – 1857 | Lestock P. W. DesBrisay | Ind. | Francis McPhelim | Ind. | | |
| 18th | 1857 – 1861 | Lestock P. W. DesBrisay | Ind. | Francis McPhelim | Ind. | | |
| 19th | 1862 – 1865 | Lestock P. W. DesBrisay | Ind. | Francis McPhelim | Ind. | | |
| 20th | 1865 – 1866 | Lestock P. W. DesBrisay | Ind. | William S. Caie | Ind. | | |
| 21st | 1866 – 1869 | Owen McInerney | Ind. | William S. Caie | Ind. | | |
| 21st | 1869 – 1870 | Urbain Johnson | Lib. | William S. Caie | Ind. | | |
| 22nd | 1870 – 1873 | Antoine Girouard | Cons. | William S. Caie | Ind. | | |
| 22nd | 1873 – 1874 | Antoine Girouard | Cons. | Henry O'Leary | Ind. | | |
| 23rd | 1875 – 1878 | Urbain Johnson | Lib. | Henry O'Leary | Ind. | | |
| 24th | 1879 – 1882 | Urbain Johnson | Lib. | Charles T. Sayre | Ind. | | |
| 25th | 1883 – 1886 | William Wheaton | Ind. | Olivier J. Leblanc | Lib. | | |
| 26th | 1886 – 1887 | William Wheaton | Ind. | Olivier J. Leblanc | Lib. | | |
| 26th | 1887 – 1890 | James D. Phinney | Lib.-Con. | Olivier J. Leblanc | Lib. | | |
| 27th | 1890 – 1891 | James D. Phinney | Lib.-Con. | Olivier J. Leblanc | Lib. | | |
| 27th | 1891 – 1892 | James D. Phinney | Lib.-Con. | Auguste Théophile Léger | Lib. | | |
| 28th | 1892 – 1895 | James D. Phinney | Lib.-Con. | Jean-Baptiste Goguen | Lib.-Con. | | |
| 29th | 1896 – 1899 | Urbain Johnson | Lib. | Pierre H. Léger | Cons. | James Barnes | Lib. |
| 30th | 1899 – 1900 | Urbain Johnson | Lib. | Pierre H. Léger | Cons. | James Barnes | Lib. |
| 30th | 1901 – 1903 | Urbain Johnson | Lib. | Richard A. Poirier | Ind. | James Barnes | Lib. |
| 31st | 1903 – 1908 | Urbain Johnson | Lib. | Jean-Baptiste Goguen | Lib.-Con. | James Barnes | Lib. |
| 32nd | 1908 – 1912 | Thomas-Jean Bourque | Cons. | David-Vital Landry | Cons. | John Sheridan | Ind. |
| 33rd | 1912 – 1917 | Thomas-Jean Bourque | Cons. | David-Vital Landry | Cons. | John Sheridan | Ind. |
| 34th | 1917 – 1920 | Philias J. Melanson | Ind. | Auguste Bordage | Lib. | Allison Dysart | Lib. |
| 35th | 1921 – 1925 | Philias J. Melanson | Ind. | Auguste Bordage | Lib. | Allison Dysart | Lib. |
| 36th | 1925 – 1930 | François G. Richard | Lib. | Auguste Bordage | Lib. | Allison Dysart | Lib. |
| 37th | 1931 – 1935 | François G. Richard | Lib. | Auguste Bordage | Lib. | Allison Dysart | Lib. |
| 38th | 1935 – 1939 | François G. Richard | Lib. | Auguste Bordage | Lib. | Allison Dysart | Lib. |
| 39th | 1939 – 1940 | Isaie Melanson | Lib. | Auguste Bordage | Lib. | Allison Dysart | Lib. |
| 39th | 1940 – 1944 | Isaie Melanson | Lib. | Auguste Bordage | Lib. | J. Killeen McKee | Lib. |
| 40th | 1944 – 1948 | Isaie Melanson | Lib. | Armand Richard | Lib. | J. Killeen McKee | Lib. |
| 41st | 1948 – 1952 | Isaie Melanson | Lib. | Armand Richard | Lib. | J. Killeen McKee | Lib. |
| 42nd | 1952 – 1956 | Isaie Melanson | Lib. | Hugh A. Dysart | Lib. | Louis Robichaud | Lib. |
| 43rd | 1957 – 1960 | André F. Richard | Lib. | Hugh A. Dysart | Lib. | Louis Robichaud | Lib. |
| 44th | 1960 – 1963 | André F. Richard | Lib. | Hugh A. Dysart | Lib. | Louis Robichaud | Lib. |
| 45th | 1963 – 1964 | André F. Richard | Lib. | Hugh A. Dysart | Lib. | Louis Robichaud | Lib. |
| 45th | 1964 – 1967 | André F. Richard | Lib. | Camille Bordage | Lib. | Louis Robichaud | Lib. |
| 46th | 1967 – 1970 | André F. Richard | Lib. | Alan R. Graham | Lib. | Louis Robichaud | Lib. |
| 47th | 1970 – 1971 | André F. Richard | Lib. | Alan R. Graham | Lib. | Louis Robichaud | Lib. |
| 47th | 1971 – 1974 | André F. Richard | Lib. | Alan R. Graham | Lib. | Omer Léger | PC |
Riding dissolved into Kent Centre, Kent North and Kent South

== Election results ==
New Brunswick provincial by-election, 4 October 1971
| Party | Candidate | Votes | Elected |
|---|---|---|---|
| Progressive Conservative | Omer Léger | 6,682 | ✓ |
| Liberal | Omer Cormier | 4,610 | |

1970 New Brunswick general election
| Party | Candidate | Votes | Elected |
|---|---|---|---|
| Liberal | Louis J. Robichaud | 6,608 | ✓ |
| Liberal | Alan R. Graham | 6,581 | ✓ |
| Liberal | André F. Richard | 6,033 | ✓ |
| Progressive Conservative | Oliver J. Babineau | 2,618 | |
| Progressive Conservative | Ulysse Robichaud | 2,521 | |
| Progressive Conservative | Fred Hutchinson | 2,495 | |

1967 New Brunswick general election
| Party | Candidate | Votes | Elected |
|---|---|---|---|
| Liberal | Louis J. Robichaud | 6,424 | ✓ |
| Liberal | Alan R. Graham | 6,216 | ✓ |
| Liberal | André Richard | 6,006 | ✓ |
| Progressive Conservative | Émile Daigle | 3,645 | |
| Progressive Conservative | Byron Hannay | 3,635 | |
| Progressive Conservative | ? Leblanc | 3,498 | |

== See also ==
- List of New Brunswick provincial electoral districts
- Canadian provincial electoral districts
