= Allison Dysart =

Canadian politician, lawyer and judge

A. Allison Dysart
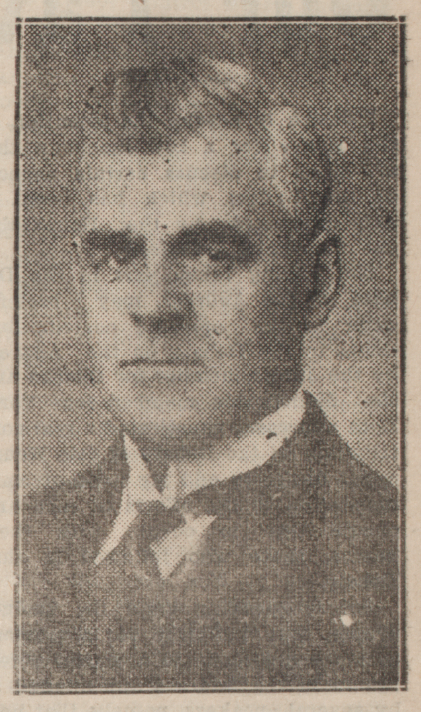
- Dysart, pictured in a 1938 newspaper

22nd Premier of New Brunswick
- In office July 16, 1935 – March 13, 1940
- Monarchs: George V Edward VIII; George VI
- Lieutenant Governor: Murray MacLaren; William G. Clark
- Preceded by: Leonard P. D. Tilley
- Succeeded by: John B. McNair

MLA for Kent
- In office February 24, 1917 – March 13, 1940 Serving with Philias J. Melanson, Auguste Bordage, R. G. Richard, François G. Richard, Isaie Melanson
- Preceded by: Thomas-Jean Bourque; David-Vital Landry
- Succeeded by: J. Killeen McKee

Personal details
- Born: March 22, 1880 Cocagne, New Brunswick, Canada
- Died: December 8, 1962 (aged 82) Moncton, New Brunswick, Canada
- Party: Liberal
- Spouse: Blanche Cannel McDougall (m. 1916)
- Children: 1 son and 2 daughters
- Education: Ontario Agricultural College; Dalhousie Law School
- Occupation: lawyer and judge
- Profession: politician

Albert Allison Dysart (March 22, 1880 – December 8, 1962) was a New Brunswick politician, lawyer and judge.

== Life ==
Dysart was born in Cocagne, New Brunswick and had an ancestry of Scottish and English Loyalist. Initially having an interest in farming, he graduated from the University of St. Joseph's College in Memramcook where he got a Master of Arts, and received further education at the Ontario Agricultural College. Years later, Dysart would enter Dalhousie Law School and in 1914 he was called to the bar, setting up practice in Bouctouche. He was elected to the provincial legislature in 1917 and served as Speaker from 1921 to 1925 and served briefly as Minister of Lands and Mines in 1925 until the defeat of the Liberal government.

In 1926, Dysart succeeded Peter J. Veniot as leader of the Liberal party. In 1935 the Liberals returned to power and Dysart became the 22nd premier of New Brunswick. Dysart also served as his own Minister of Public Works from 1935 to 1938, and Chairman of the New Brunswick Electric Power Commission, from 1938 until his retirement from politics. His government introduced the first Landlord and Tenants Act in 1938 and updated the Labour Relations Act. It attempted to create jobs in the Great Depression through extensive road construction. After suffering from poor health from some time, he led the government to re-election in 1939 and resigned in 1940 to become a County Court Judge of Westmorland and Kent Counties. He served in that position until his retirement in 1955.

His former home in Shediac, New Brunswick is a registered historic place. He lived there from 1943 until his death.

New Brunswick provincial government of Peter J. Veniot
Cabinet post (1)
Predecessor	Office	Successor
Peter J. Veniot	Minister of Lands and Mines; 1925	Charles D. Richards
