= Louis Robichaud =

Canadian politician (1925–2005)

The Honourable Louis Robichaud PC CC ONB QC
- Robichaud in 1960

25th Premier of New Brunswick
- In office July 12, 1960 – November 11, 1970
- Monarch: Elizabeth II
- Lieutenant Governor: Joseph Leonard O'Brien; John B. McNair; Wallace Samuel Bird
- Preceded by: Hugh John Flemming
- Succeeded by: Richard Hatfield

Member of the Legislative Assembly of New Brunswick
- In office September 22, 1952 – April 30, 1971 Serving with Isaie Melanson, Hugh A. Dysart, André F. Richard, Camille Bordage, Alan R. Graham
- Preceded by: J. Killeen McKee
- Succeeded by: Omer Léger
- Constituency: Kent

Senator for Saint-Louis-de-Kent, New Brunswick
- In office December 21, 1973 – October 21, 2000
- Appointed by: Pierre Trudeau

Personal details
- Born: Louis Joseph Robichaud; October 21, 1925 Saint-Antoine, New Brunswick, Canada
- Died: January 6, 2005 (aged 79) Sainte-Anne-de-Kent, New Brunswick, Canada
- Party: Liberal
- Spouses: Lorraine Robichaud; Jacqueline Robichaud

Louis Joseph Robichaud PC CC ONB QC (October 21, 1925 – January 6, 2005), popularly known as "Little Louis" or "P'tit-Louis", was the second (but first elected) Acadian premier of New Brunswick, serving from 1960 to 1970.

With the Equal Opportunity program, the language rights act of 1969 establishing New Brunswick as an officially bilingual province, and for his role in the creation of the Université de Moncton, Robichaud is credited with ushering in major social reform in New Brunswick.

== Early life ==
Louis Joseph Robichaud was born on October 21, 1925, in a two-storey house in Saint-Antoine, New Brunswick.

== Life and achievements ==
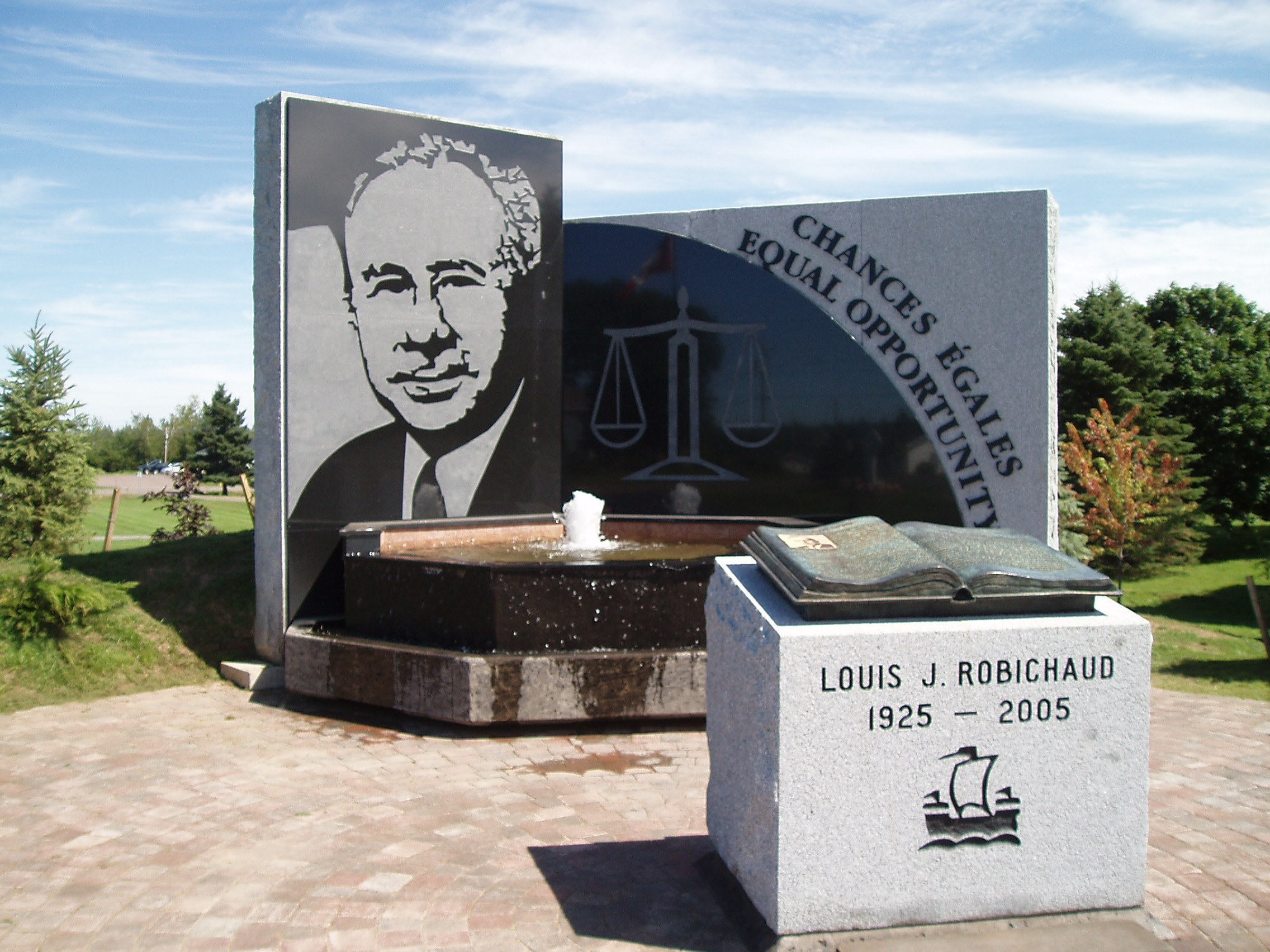
Memorial to Robichaud in his birthplace, Saint-Antoine (now Champdoré), New Brunswick

At the age of 14, Robichaud left home to enter the Juvénat Saint-Jean-Eudes in Bathurst to study for a career in the Church. After his third year at the school, he decided instead to pursue a political career. He attended the Collège du Sacré-Coeur (now part of the Université de Moncton) and graduated in 1947 with a Bachelor of Arts degree. He then went on to study economics and political science at Université Laval. He articled with a law firm in Bathurst for three years and, upon being admitted to the bar, practised law for a short period of time in Richibucto.

He was elected to the Legislative Assembly of New Brunswick in 1952 as the youngest ever Acadian member of the assembly to that date.

He became provincial Liberal leader in 1958 and led his party to victory in 1960, 1963 and 1967 before being defeated by Richard Hatfield's Conservatives in the 1970 election.

Robichaud was the first Acadian Premier of New Brunswick since Peter J. Veniot and the first to win an election. He modernized the province's hospitals and public schools and introduced a wide range of social reforms. The Liberals also passed the New Brunswick Official Languages Act (1969) making New Brunswick officially bilingual. "Language rights", he said when he introduced the legislation, "are more than legal rights. They are precious cultural rights, going deep into the revered past and touching the historic traditions of all our people."

Robichaud also restructured the municipal tax regime, ending the ability of business to play one municipality against another in order to extract the lowest tax rates. He introduced in 1963 the Municipal Capital Borrowing Act and Board, which is designed to act as a brake for spendthrift municipalities. He also expanded the government and sought to ensure that the quality of health care, education and social services was the same across the province—a programme he called Equal Opportunity, which is still a political buzz phrase in New Brunswick. "When I first realized that there was absolutely no equal opportunity, no equality, in New Brunswick," he recalled in the 1980s, "well, I had to come to the conclusion that something had to be done immediately."

A desk made for Robichaud by the Saint John Shipbuilding and Dry Dock Company and given to him in 1966, which he used during his last years as premier and which was used by his successor Richard Hatfield was returned to the Premier's Office by Shawn Graham in 2006.

He was instrumental in the creation of the Université de Moncton in 1963, while in 1969, a high school was named in his honour in Shediac, New Brunswick.

After the FLQ murder of Pierre Laporte, the Ministry of Justice insisted on Robichaud spending his final days as Premier ahead of the 1970 election in seclusion with an RCMP detail - staying at the house of his friend journalist John Edward Belliveau.

In 1971, upon resigning from the legislature, he was made a Companion of the Order of Canada and Canadian chairman of the International Joint Commission, a post he held until being called to the Senate of Canada on December 21, 1973. He sat in the Senate until his mandatory retirement from the upper house on October 21, 2000 upon reaching his seventy-fifth birthday.

He was a resident of New Brunswick at the time of his death from cancer at the Stella-Maris-De-Kent Hospital in Sainte-Anne-de-Kent, near his birthplace of Saint-Antoine, New Brunswick. The cancer had been discovered only a few weeks before his death. He died on January 6, 2005.

== See also ==
- Westmorland Chemical Park - An industrial park created by Robichaud's government
