= Léger (surname) =

Léger or Leger (sometimes as Légère or Legere) is a surname, and may refer to:

- Alexis Leger (1887–1975), French poet and diplomat who used the pseudonym Saint-John Perse, awarded the Nobel Prize for Literature
- Allan Legere (born 1948), Canadian serial killer
- Antoine Joseph Léger (1880–1950), Canadian politician, lawyer and author
- Auguste Théophile Léger (1852–1923), Canadian politician
- Aurel Léger (1894–1961), Canadian politician
- Dick Leger (1925–1999), square dance caller
- Édouard H. Léger (1866–1892), Canadian politician and physician
- Émile Léger (1795–1838), French mathematician
- Fernand Léger (1881–1955), French painter, sculptor and filmmaker
- Jacqueline Legere (born 1991), Canadian athlete and stuntwoman
- Jacques Nicolas Léger (1859–1918), Haitian lawyer, politician and diplomat
- John Legere (born 1958), American CEO of T-Mobile
- Jules Léger (1913–1980), Canadian diplomat and Governor General of Canada (1974–1979)
- Louis Léger (1843–1923), French writer and pioneer in Slavic studies
- Marcel Léger (1930–1993), Canadian politician
- Mary Legere, American general
- Nicole Léger (born 1955), Canadian politician
- Omer Léger (1931–2023), Canadian politician
- Paul-Émile Léger (1904–1991), Canadian Roman Catholic cardinal and Archbishop of Montreal
- Phoebe Legere, American musician
- Ricky Legere (born 1985), American mixed martial artist
- Roger Leger (1919–1965), Canadian National Hockey League player
- Sébastien Léger (born 1979), French DJ
- Silviane Léger (1935–2012), French sculptor
- Teresa Leger Fernandez (born 1959), American politician
- Urbain-Louis-Eugène Léger (1866–1948), French zoologist
- Viola Léger (1930-2023), Acadian-Canadian actress and former Canadian senator
- Walt Leger III (born 1978), American politician in Louisiana
- Leger (chess player), an 18th-century chess player

== See also ==
- Leger (disambiguation)
