= Israël Landry =

Canadian writer and musician (1843–1910)

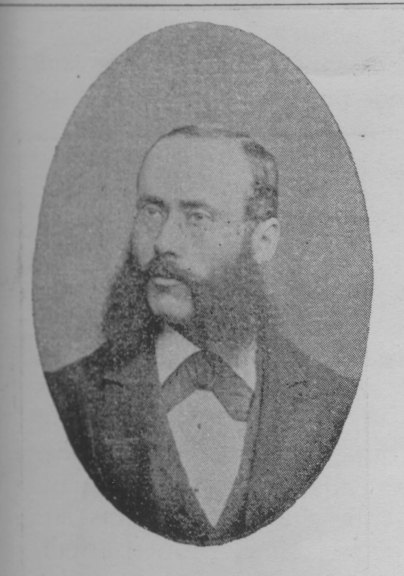
- Portrait of Landry, 1892
- Born: Jean-Misaël Maynard; December 1, 1843; Dorchester, Canada East, Province of Canada, British North America
- Died: April 22, 1910 (aged 66); Saint John, New Brunswick, Canada
- Other names: Israël Maynard; Israël Ménard; Mr. Landry of Montreal; Israel J. D. Landry, Editor-Owner
- Occupations: Writer, musician, teacher, publisher.
- Known for: Le Moniteur Acadien

Israël-J.-D. Landry (December 1, 1843 – April 22, 1910) was a Canadian writer, teacher, musician, and publisher. He is known for founding the first French-language Acadian newspaper Le Moniteur Acadien. In 1955, he was declared a Person of National Historic Significance as part of the Acadian Men of Letters.

== Early life and education ==
Landry was born on December 1, 1843, in Dorchester, Canada East, Province of Canada, British North America (present day Saint-Jean-sur-Richelieu, Quebec, Canada) as the eldest son to Jean-Misaël Maynard, a farmer, and Constance Bélanger. He was baptized as Jean-Misaël Maynard on December 2, 1843, at the Church of St. John the Evangelist. He was likely educated at the Petit Seminare de Montreal as an Israël Ménard was enrolled there in 1857 and 1858.

== Career ==
In 1862, Landry moved to Rustico, Prince Edward Island to work with Father George-Antoine Bellecourt. There he worked at the Rustico School for two years, serving as its principal. He also took special attention in teaching music and voice and serving as both an organist and choirmaster. He was also involved in a youth brass orchestra which was well renowned on the island. In Rustico is where he became interested in the efforts of the Acadians to protect their language.

He then moved to Chatham, New Brunswick, where he was the organist for St. Michael's Basilica and a music teacher. In March 1867 he wrote and published a prospectus for a French-language newspaper. Landry then moved to Shediac and on July 8, 1867, he published the first issue of Le Moniteur Acadien. Le Moniteur was the first French-language newspaper published in the Maritimes. The paper was successful and published weekly issues, and still publishes as of 2024.

Later in 1867, he ran in the first Canadian general election as the Conservative candidate for the seat of Westmorland. He was defeated by Liberal candidate Albert James Smith.

In 1868, Landry suspended publication of the newspaper for financial reasons and later sold it to its publisher, F.-X.-N.-Norbert Lussier. He then moved to Saint John to work as an organist and choir conductor at the Cathedral of the Immaculate Conception. While in Saint John he opened a music store where he sold instruments and sheet music. He also published music, including some of his own compositions, in a monthly publication named Landry's Musical Journal. Copies of his music were included in the Canadian Musical Heritage Society and later Library and Archives Canada.

== Personal life and death ==
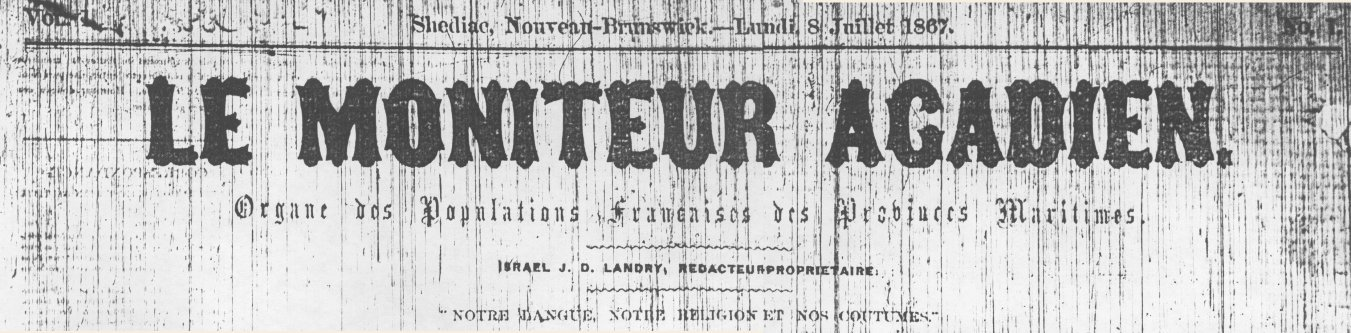
First issue of Le Moniteur acadien

Landry was called Israël Maynard (or Ménard) from an early age. He changed his name from Jean-Misaël Maynard to Israël Landry around his arrival at Rustico.

Early in his career he was known as Mr. Landry of Montreal, and later as Israel J. D. Landry, Editor-Owner once he began publishing Le Moniteur acadien.

He married Ellen "Ella" McGourty on November 16, 1869, in Saint John, New Brunswick. Together they had two children, daughter Geneviève Landry (born August 1870) and son John Aimé Landry (12 July 1872 – September 1873).

Landry died in Saint John on April 22, 1910, at the age of 66. He is buried at St. Mary's Cemetery in Saint John.

== Awards and honours ==
In 1955, Landry was declared a Person of National Historic Significance as part of the Acadian Men of Letters. The Men of Letters also includes Pascal Poirier, Placide Gaudet, John Clarence Webster, and Ferdinand Robidoux. Their plaque is located at 229 Main Street in Shediac, New Brunswick.
