= Hervé Michaud =

Canadian politician (1912–1978)

The Hon. Hervé J. Michaud

Member of the Canadian Parliament for Kent
- In office November 1953 – April 1962
- Preceded by: Aurel Léger
- Succeeded by: Guy Crossman

Senator for Kent, New Brunswick
- In office 15 March 1968 – 5 June 1978
- Appointed by: Lester B. Pearson

Personal details
- Born: 28 December 1912 Bouctouche, New Brunswick, Canada
- Died: 5 June 1978 (aged 65)
- Party: Liberal
- Profession: farmer, salesman

Hervé J. Michaud (28 December 1912 – 5 June 1978) was a Canadian politician, farmer and salesman. Michaud served as a Liberal party member of the House of Commons of Canada and the Senate.

He was born in Bouctouche, New Brunswick. Michaud was educated in New Brunswick at University of St. Joseph's College and at the school of agriculture at Sainte-Anne-de-la-Pocatière, Quebec.

He was first elected at the Kent riding in the 1953 general election, then re-elected there in the 1957 and 1958 elections. He served three consecutive terms from the 22nd through the 24th Parliaments then did not seek another term as of the 1962 election.

Michaud was appointed to the Senate on 15 March 1968 in the Kent senatorial division during the administration of Lester B. Pearson. He remained a Senator until his death on 5 June 1978.

== Electoral record ==
1958 Canadian federal election: Kent
Party	Candidate	Votes	%	±%
Liberal	Hervé Michaud	6,118	55.4	-2.4
Progressive Conservative	Louis LeBlanc	4,988	44.6	+2.4

1957 Canadian federal election: Kent
Party	Candidate	Votes	%	±%
Liberal	Hervé Michaud	6,424	57.8	-8.3
Progressive Conservative	Louis LeBlanc	4,682	42.2	+8.3

1953 Canadian federal election: Kent
Party	Candidate	Votes	%	±%
Liberal	Hervé Michaud	7,039	66.1	+17.1
Progressive Conservative	Emile Verret	3,603	33.9	+12.6
