= Louis-Prudent-Alexandre Robichaud =

Canadian politician

Member of the Canadian Parliament for Kent
- In office 1935–1940
- Preceded by: Télesphore Arsenault
- Succeeded by: Aurel D. Léger

Personal details
- Born: 25 January 1890 Cocagne, New Brunswick
- Died: 17 March 1971 (aged 81) Richibucto, New Brunswick
- Party: Liberal
- Education: University of St. Joseph's College; Dalhousie University
- Occupation: lawyer

Louis-Prudent-Alexandre Robichaud (25 January 1890 – 17 March 1971) was a New Brunswick political figure and jurist.

Robichaud was born in Cocagne, New Brunswick. He was educated at the University of St. Joseph's College where he earned his Bachelor of Arts and at Dalhousie University where he graduated with a law degree. He began his law practice in Richibouctou-Village, New Brunswick in 1915.

He first ran for federal office in the 1925 federal election but was defeated in Kent. He tried again in the same riding in the 1935 federal election and was returned to the House of Commons of Canada as a Liberal MP. He did not run for re-election in the 1940 election. He sat on the province's war committee during the 1940s and, in 1950, was appointed a Probate court judge. Robichaud died in 1971 in Richibucto.

== Electoral history ==
1935 Canadian federal election: Kent
Party	Candidate	Votes	%	±%
Liberal	Louis P. Robichaud	6,504	68.2	+20.2
Conservative	Télesphore Arsenault	4,884	16.7	-35.3
Independent	Alexandre-Joseph Doucet	1,442	15.1	*
