= John Sheridan (New Brunswick politician) =

Former Canadian politician

Lieutenant Colonel John Sheridan

Member of the Legislative Assembly of New Brunswick
- In office 1908–1917 Serving with David-Vital Landry, Thomas-Jean Bourque
- Constituency: Kent

Personal details
- Born: May 18, 1856 Buctouche, New Brunswick
- Died: January 13, 1932 (aged 75) Little River, New Brunswick
- Party: Independent
- Spouse: H. Maud King (m. 1883)
- Children: 6
- Occupation: Farmer

John Sheridan (May 18, 1856 – January 13, 1932) was a Canadian politician. He served in the Legislative Assembly of New Brunswick from 1908 to 1917 as an Independent member.
