= Men of Letters (Acadia) =

The Acadian Men of Letters are a group of literary figures who are noted for their work in Acadian history, literature, language, and culture. They were active from the 1880s to the 1930s and made up of Pascal Poirier, Placide Gaudet, Israël Landry, Ferdinand Robidoux and Anglophone John Clarence Webster. They were declared Persons of National Historic Significance in Canada in 1955 and have a plaque dedicated to them in Shediac, New Brunswick.

== Members ==
=== Pascal Poirier ===
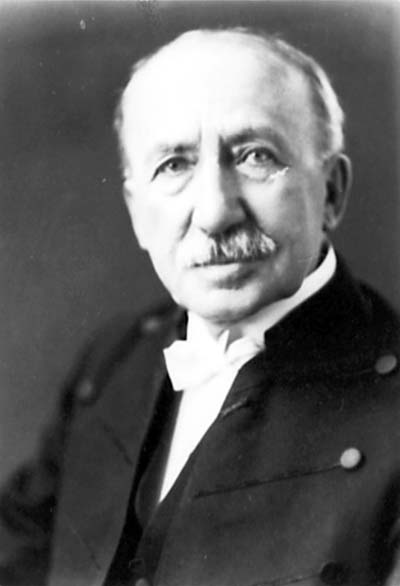
Portrait of Pascal Poirier

Pascal Poirier (February 15, 1852 – September 25, 1933) was an author, historian, lawyer, and Senator. Born in Shediac, New Brunswick he was educated at College Saint-Joseph in Memramcook. While studying there he wrote multiple articles and a glossary of the Acadian French language and a book about the origin of the Acadians which contradicted many myths at the time. Following his education he worked as Postmaster of the Dominion Parliament for thirteen years before being appointed as Senator for L'Acadie, New Brunswick in 1885. He served as Senator for 48 years, 6 months, and 17 days until his death in 1933. This makes him the longest serving Senator in Canadian history, and with the current legislative limits of a minimum age of 30 and a retirement age of 75 no other Senator will be able to break the record.

=== Placide Gaudet ===
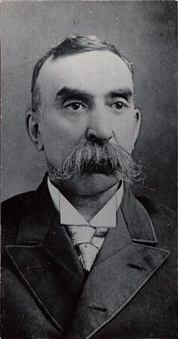
Portrait of Placide Gaudet

Placide Gaudet (November 19, 1850 – November 9, 1930) was a historian, educator, genealogist, and journalist. Born in Cap-Pelé, New Brunswick he studied at College Saint-Joseph. He took on several teaching jobs across New Brunswick, including at Collège Sainte-Anne. while combining oral history from his maternal grandfather with research of the history and genealogy of Acadians and began writing articles on his findings. He was contracted by the Canadian Dominion Archives multiple times to copy archives and records from Acadian communities in New Brunswick and Prince Edward Island. He also published in multiple newspapers including Le Moniteur Acadien, Courrier des provinces Maritimes, and L'Évangéline. In 1906 he published Report concerning Canadian archives for the year 1905, a genealogy of Acadian families.

=== John Clarence Webster ===
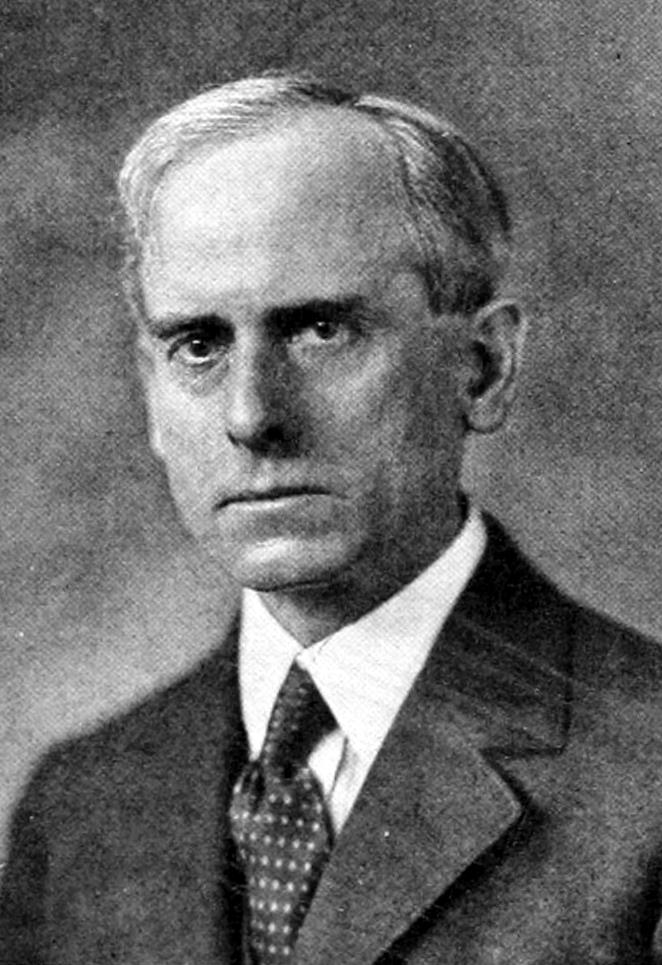
Portrait of John Clarence Webster

John Clarence Webster (21 October 1863 – 16 March 1950) was a physician, surgeon, pioneer in Obstetrics and gynaecology, writer, and historian. He was born in Shediac, New Brunswick and educated at Mount Allison College and the University of Edinburgh. He then worked as a gynecologist at the Royal Victoria Hospital and as a lecturer at the McGill University and Rush Medical College, while doing this writing multiple publications on Obstetrics and gynaecology. Following his retirement in 1919 he became a historian and collected many primary sources about New Brunswick history that were later donated to the New Brunswick Museum. He also wrote and published numerous books about the history of New Brunswick, Nova Scotia, and Acadia. He also served on many boards and organizations related to history, archives, and historic sites.

=== Israël Landry ===
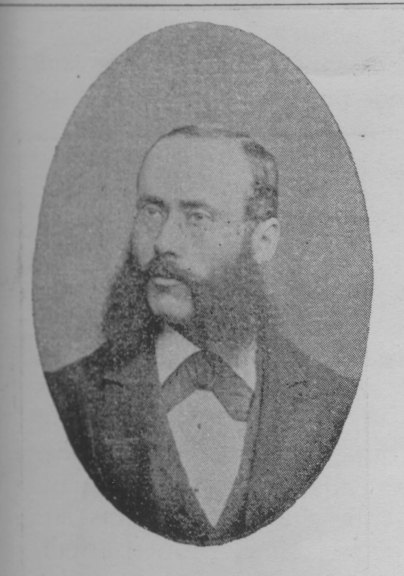
Portrait of Israël Landry

Israël-J.-D. Landry (1 December 1843 – 22 April 1910) was a writer, teacher, musician, and publisher. Born in Dorchester, Canada East he later lived in Prince Edward Island and New Brunswick. He is most noted for creating, editing, and publishing the first issues of Le Moniteur Acadien from 1867 to 1868. He also wrote and published music in the monthly Landry's Musical Journal, which was later included in the collections of the Canadian Musical Heritage Society and Library and Archives Canada.

=== Ferdinand Robidoux ===
Ferdinand Robidoux (1849 – 1921) was a writer, editor, and publisher who served as the editor and owner of Le Moniteur Acadien from 1871 until 1918, being its third owner. He also wrote and published a collection of speeches and other content from the first three Acadian National Conventions.
