= James Barnes (Canadian politician) =

Canadian politician

Member of the Legislative Assembly of New Brunswick
- In office 1896–1908 Serving with Urbain Johnson, Richard A. Poirier, Pierre H. Léger, Jean-Baptiste Goguen
- Constituency: Kent

Personal details
- Born: September 6, 1842 Cornwall, Ontario
- Died: November 8, 1924 (aged 82)
- Party: New Brunswick Liberal Association
- Spouse: Julia Eliza Smith
- Occupation: Farmer, contractor

James Barnes (September 6, 1842 – November 8, 1924) was a farmer, lumberman, railway contractor and political figure in New Brunswick, Canada. He represented Kent County in the Legislative Assembly of New Brunswick from 1895 to 1908 as a Liberal member.

He was born in Cornwall and later came to Bouctouche, New Brunswick. Barnes married a Julia Eliza Smith there. He ran unsuccessfully for a seat in the provincial assembly in 1892.
