= François G. Richard =

Canadian politician

Member of the Legislative Assembly of New Brunswick
- In office 1931–1939
- Constituency: Kent

Personal details
- Born: February 2, 1873 Saint-Édouard-de-Kent, New Brunswick
- Died: March 29, 1967 (aged 94) Ste-Anne-de-Kent, New Brunswick
- Party: New Brunswick Liberal Association
- Spouse: Marie-Jeanne Richard
- Children: 12
- Occupation: farmer, storekeeper, insurance agent

François G. Richard (February 2, 1873 – March 29, 1967) was a Canadian politician. He served in the Legislative Assembly of New Brunswick as the Liberal party member for Kent County from 1925 to 1939. His son André would also later serve in the legislature for the same riding from 1957 to 1974.
