= Richard A. Poirier =

Former Canadian politician

Member of the Legislative Assembly of New Brunswick
- In office February 10, 1901 – 1903 Serving with Urbain Johnson, James Barnes
- Constituency: Kent

Personal details
- Born: May 1, 1842 Cocagne, New Brunswick
- Party: Independent
- Spouse: Julie Cormier (m. 1874)
- Occupation: Farmer

Richard A. Poirier (born May 1, 1842) was a Canadian politician. He served in the Legislative Assembly of New Brunswick from 1900 to 1903 as an Independent member.
