= Evening Ledger =

Evening Ledger may refer to multiple newspapers or their evening editions:

- Public Ledger (Philadelphia), Pennsylvania
- The Ledger, in Lakewood, Florida, founded as Lakeland Evening Ledger
- The Mexico Ledger, Mexico, Missouri, known as Mexico Evening Ledger (1886-1968)

== See also ==
- Ledger (disambiguation)
