= Olivier J. Leblanc =

Canadian politician

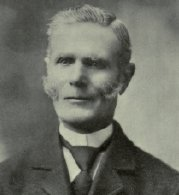

Member of the Canadian Parliament for Kent
- In office 1900–1911
- Preceded by: George Valentine McInerney
- Succeeded by: Ferdinand-Joseph Robidoux

Member of the Legislative Council of New Brunswick
- In office 1891–1892

Member of the Legislative Assembly of New Brunswick for Kent County
- In office 1882–1891
- Preceded by: Urbain Johnson
- Succeeded by: Auguste Théophile Léger

Personal details
- Born: November 27, 1830 Memramcook, New Brunswick
- Died: December 14, 1919 (aged 89)
- Party: Liberal

Olivier J. LeBlanc (November 27, 1830 – December 14, 1919) was a Canadian politician of Acadian descent.

Born in Memramcook, New Brunswick, the son of Joseph LeBlanc and Victorie B. Girouard, LeBlanc was educated at Common Schools. A farmer, he was elected to the Legislative Assembly of New Brunswick in 1882. His election in 1882 was protested but he was reelected in a by-election held later that year. Leblanc subsequently was a Minister without portfolio in the Executive Council from 1889 to 1891. He ran unsuccessfully for a federal seat in 1891 and was then named to the Legislative Council of New Brunswick.

LeBlanc was first elected to the House of Commons of Canada for the riding of Kent in the general elections of 1900. A Liberal, he was re-elected in 1904 and 1908.

== Electoral record ==
1911 Canadian federal election: Kent
Party	Candidate	Votes	%	±%
Conservative	Ferdinand-Joseph Robidoux	2,334	52.3	+10.4
Liberal	Olivier J. Leblanc	2,129	47.7	-10.4

1908 Canadian federal election: Kent
Party	Candidate	Votes	%	±%
Liberal	Olivier J. Leblanc	2,580	58.1	+8.6
Conservative	Ferdinand-Joseph Robidoux	1,860	41.9	-5.3

1904 Canadian federal election: Kent
Party	Candidate	Votes	%	±%
Liberal	Olivier J. Leblanc	2,078	49.5	-7.9
Conservative	George McInerney	1,979	47.2	+4.6
Independent Liberal	Pascal Herbert	138	3.3	*

1900 Canadian federal election: Kent
Party	Candidate	Votes	%	±%
Liberal	Olivier J. Leblanc	2,447	57.4	+14.8
Conservative	George McInerney	1,816	42.6	-14.8

1896 Canadian federal election: Kent
Party	Candidate	Votes	%	±%
Conservative	George McInerney	2,041	57.4	-5.6
Liberal	Olivier J. Leblanc	1,514	42.6	+5.6

1891 Canadian federal election: Kent
Party	Candidate	Votes	%	±%
Conservative	Édouard H. Léger	1,722	63.0	+7.5
Liberal	Olivier J. Leblanc	1,011	37.0	-7.5
