= Aşağı Ləgər =

Aşağı Ləgər may refer to:

- Aşağı Ləgər, Khachmaz, Azerbaijan
- Aşağı Ləgər, Qusar, Azerbaijan
- Ləgərqışlaq, Azerbaijan
