= George McLeod (New Brunswick politician) =

Canadian politician

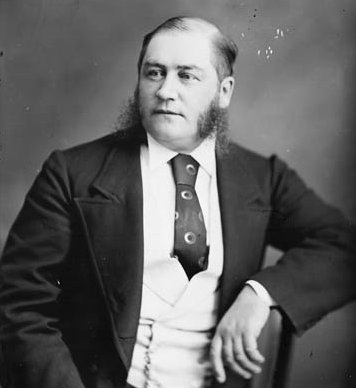

Member of the Canadian Parliament for Kent
- In office 1874–1878
- Preceded by: Robert Barry Cutler
- Succeeded by: Gilbert Anselme Girouard

Personal details
- Born: April 26, 1836 Richibucto, New Brunswick
- Died: May 7, 1905 (aged 69) Saint John, New Brunswick
- Party: Independent

George McLeod (April 26, 1836 – May 7, 1905) was a Canadian politician, lumber merchant, manufacturer, shipbuilder, shipowner based in New Brunswick.

He was born in Richibucto, New Brunswick, the son of William McLeod and Elizabeth Sutherland, both Scottish immigrants, and was educated there and at the Sackville Academy. McLeod was married twice: to Sarah Abramo Kerr in 1859 and to Sarah Gordon in 1870. He served as an independent Member of Parliament in the House of Commons of Canada representing Kent, New Brunswick from 1874 until his defeat in the 1878 federal election. He attempted to return to parliament in the 1882 federal election from the riding of City of Saint John, New Brunswick, but was narrowly defeated by Sir Samuel L. Tilley, the incumbent and Minister of Finance. He died in Saint John, New Brunswick at the age of 69.

1878 Canadian federal election: Kent
Party	Candidate	Votes	%	±%
Conservative	Gilbert Anselme Girouard	810	29.9	
Liberal	Robert Barry Cutler	726	26.8	
Independent	George McLeod	510	18.8	
Unknown	H. O'Leary	382	14.1	
Liberal	George McInerney	280	10.3	

1874 Canadian federal election: Kent
Party	Candidate	Votes	%	±%
Independent	George McLeod	1,570	59.4	
Liberal	Auguste Renaud	1,256	40.6	
lop.parl.ca
