= Leger =

Leger or Léger may refer to:

== People ==
- Léger (surname), a list of people with the surname Léger or Leger
- Leodegar or Leger (615-679), Chalcedonian saint, martyr and Bishop of Autun
- Leger Djime (born 1987), Chadian footballer
- Leger Douzable (born 1986), National Football League player

== Other uses ==
- Leger, Edmonton, Canada, a city neighbourhood
- Hotel Léger, one of the oldest hotels in California
- St. Leger Stakes, one of the five "Classic" British horse races, often referred to as "the Leger"
- Léger (company), a Canadian opinion polling and market research firm
- Leger Holidays, British escorted coach company

== See also ==
- Ledger (disambiguation)
- Ləgər (disambiguation)
