= Placide Gaudet =

Canadian historian, educator, genealogist and journalist

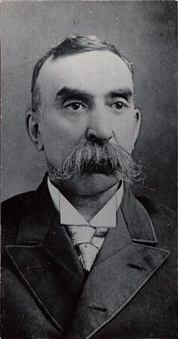
- Born: November 19, 1850; Shediac, New Brunswick, British North America
- Died: November 9, 1930 (aged 79)
- Occupations: Historian, educator, genealogist, and journalist
- Known for: Research of Acadian history
- Spouse: Marie-Rose Arsenault

Placide Gaudet (November 19, 1850 – November 9, 1930) was a Canadian historian, educator, genealogist and journalist. He signed his name as Placide P. Gaudet. Gaudet is noted for his research into the history and genealogy of the Acadian people and played an important role in the preservation of their history.

== Biography ==
=== Early years ===
He was born at Cap-Pelé, New Brunswick, the son of Placide Gaudet and Marie Vienneau dit Michaud. Gaudet's father died shortly before his birth and his mother returned to her father's farm. She moved to her father-in-law's farm in Dorchester in 1862.

=== Education and career ===
Gaudet was educated at St. Joseph's College in Memramcook. He began studies for the priesthood at the Grand Séminaire de Montréal but left in 1874 due to poor health, returning to New Brunswick. From 1874 to 1882, he then took on a number of short term teaching positions at schools in Saint-Louis de Kent, Tracadie, Neguac, Shédiac and Cocagne. It was during this time, combined with the oral history that he learned from his maternal grandfather, that Gaudet furthered his interest and research into the genealogy and history of the Acadian people. He began to write articles on his findings. From 1883 to 1885, he was given a contract by the Canadian archives to copy church archives in Acadian areas, supplementing his income by teaching. This gave Gaudet the opportunity to have access to information for his research.

Gaudet worked for several newspapers including the Courrier des provinces Maritimes, Le Moniteur Acadien and L'Évangéline.

He taught at the Collège Sainte-Anne from 1895 until the college was destroyed in a fire in 1899. Later in 1899, he was hired by the Canadian archives to copy Acadian parish archives from Prince Edward Island and New Brunswick. In 1906, Gaudet published Report concerning Canadian archives for the year 1905, a genealogy of Acadian families. As a result of his work and his own private research into local history, he became a noted authority and speaker on Acadian genealogy and history. Gaudet published Le grand dérangement in 1922.

=== Personal life ===
In 1899, Gaudet married Marie-Rose Arsenault. The couple had three daughters and one son. Two of their daughters died young.

He retired on a small pension in 1924, moving to Moncton. Gaudet died at a hospice in Shediac at the age of 79.

== Honours ==
Gaudet was declared a Person of National Historic Significance in 1955 as part of the Acadian Men of Letters.
