= Ferdinand-Joseph Robidoux =

Canadian politician

Member of the Canadian Parliament for Kent
- In office 1911–1917
- Preceded by: Olivier J. Leblanc
- Succeeded by: Auguste Théophile Léger

Personal details
- Born: October 17, 1875 Shediac, New Brunswick
- Died: June 18, 1962 (aged 86) Shediac, New Brunswick
- Party: Conservative

Ferdinand-Joseph Robidoux (October 17, 1875 – June 17, 1962) was a lawyer and political figure of Acadian descent in New Brunswick, Canada. He represented Kent in the House of Commons of Canada from 1911 to 1917 as a Conservative.

He was born in Shediac, New Brunswick, the son of Ferdinand Robidoux, who was editor-owner of Le Moniteur Acadien, and Marguerite Michaud. Robidoux was educated at Saint Joseph's University. In 1913, he married Emily Annette Evans. Robidoux practised law in Richibucto. He served on the New Brunswick Electric Power Commission from 1925 to 1935 and the New Brunswick Liquor Control Board from 1927 to 1935. He served as secretary for Kent Municipality and as a member of the town council for Shediac. Robidoux ran unsuccessfully for a seat in the House of Commons in 1908. He was defeated when he ran for re-election in the 1917 federal election held as a result of the Conscription Crisis of 1917. Robidoux ran as a supporter of the pro-conscription Unionist government and was defeated by an anti-conscription Laurier Liberal.

He founded L'Imprimerie Nationale and was publisher for La Nation from 1929 to 1930. He was the author of Les Conventions nationales des Acadiens, published in 1907.

1917 Canadian federal election: Kent
Party	Candidate	Votes	%	±%
Opposition (Laurier Liberals)	Auguste Théophile Léger	3,563	72.9	+25.2
Government (Unionist)	Ferdinand-Joseph Robidoux	1,323	27.1	-25.2

1911 Canadian federal election: Kent
Party	Candidate	Votes	%	±%
Conservative	Ferdinand-Joseph Robidoux	2,334	52.3	+10.4
Liberal	Olivier J. Leblanc	2,129	47.7	-10.4

1908 Canadian federal election: Kent
Party	Candidate	Votes	%	±%
Liberal	Olivier J. Leblanc	2,580	58.1	+8.6
Conservative	Ferdinand-Joseph Robidoux	1,860	41.9	-5.3
