= Télesphore Arsenault =

Canadian politician (1872–1964)

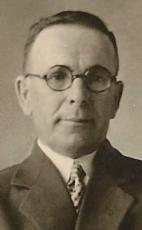

Member of the Canadian Parliament for Kent
- In office 1930–1935
- Preceded by: Alfred Edmond Bourgeois
- Succeeded by: Louis-Prudent-Alexandre Robichaud

Personal details
- Born: January 1, 1872 Egmont Bay, Prince Edward Island, Canada
- Died: January 13, 1964 (aged 92)
- Party: Conservative (1930–1940), National Government (1940–)
- Profession: Business manager, farmer

Télesphore Arsenault (January 1, 1872 – January 13, 1964) was a Canadian politician, business manager and farmer. He was elected to the House of Commons of Canada in the 1930 election in the riding of Kent as a Member of the Conservative Party and defeated in the 1935 election. He ran in the 1940 election as a Nationalist but lost.

== Electoral record ==
1940 Canadian federal election: Kent
Party	Candidate	Votes	%	±%
Liberal	Aurel Léger	5,582	64.8	-3.4
National Government	Télesphore Arsenault	3,032	35.2	+18.5

1935 Canadian federal election: Kent
Party	Candidate	Votes	%	±%
Liberal	Louis P. Robichaud	6,504	68.2	+20.2
Conservative	Télesphore Arsenault	4,884	16.7	-35.3
Independent	Alexandre-Joseph Doucet	1,442	15.1	*

1930 Canadian federal election: Kent
Party	Candidate	Votes	%	±%
Conservative	Télesphore Arsenault	4,884	52.0	+5.4
Liberal	Alfred Bourgeois	4,504	48.0	-5.4
Source(s) "Kent, New Brunswick (1867 - 1966)". History of Federal Ridings Since 1867. Library of Parliament. Archived from the original on October 22, 2012.
