= New Brunswick Equal Opportunity program =

The New Brunswick Equal Opportunity Program (French: Programme Chances égales pour tous du Nouveau-Brunswick) was a government program that transformed social services in the Canadian province of New Brunswick. It was begun in 1967 under the leadership of premier Louis Robichaud.

The program was one of a series of progressive reforms brought by Robichaud's Liberal Party government.

By the early 1960s New Brunswick had become a province with deep regional inequalities. The cause of this was that municipalities and counties were responsible for providing a wide range of services to their populations, but did not have an adequate tax base to pay for them. These services included health, welfare, education, and justice. In 1962 the Royal Commission on Finance and Municipal Taxation was formed. It proposed major services be operated by the province, funded by a market value assessment of property tax.

Parts of the report were implemented as the Equal Opportunity Program on 1 January 1967. The province took responsibility for health, welfare, education, and justice. The poll tax was abolished, the number of school districts was reduced to 34 from over 400, and property tax was imposed.

Municipalities remained geographically unchanged, although they no longer provided social services. Local government in New Brunswick's extensive rural areas, outside of municipalities, had been provided by county councils. These were abolished, leaving the county with no political role, although the old county and parish borders are still used to define the local service districts that replaced county councils, and for the census subdivisions of Census Canada.
