= George Valentine McInerney =

Canadian politician

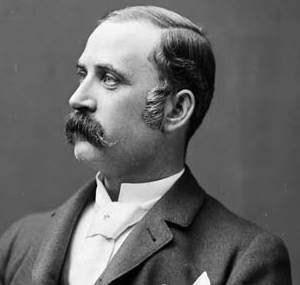

Member of the Canadian Parliament for Kent
- In office 1892–1900
- Preceded by: Édouard H. Léger
- Succeeded by: Olivier J. Leblanc

Personal details
- Born: February 14, 1857 Kingston (Five Rivers), New Brunswick
- Died: January 12, 1908 (aged 50) Saint John, New Brunswick, Canada
- Party: Liberal-Conservative
- Children: Ralph McInerney

George Valentine McInerney, QC (February 14, 1857 – January 12, 1908) was a lawyer and politician in New Brunswick. He represented Kent in the House of Commons of Canada from 1892 to 1900 as a Liberal-Conservative member.

He was born on Valentine's Day in Kingston (later Five Rivers), the son of Owen McInerney and Mary McAuley. McInerney was educated at the College of Saint Joseph in Memramcook, Boston University and Harvard University. He was called to the bar in 1880 and became a criminal lawyer in Richibucto. He served as secretary-treasurer for Kent County from 1880 to 1900. In 1882, he married Christina, the daughter of Henry O'Leary. In 1894, he was named Queen's Counsel. McInerney also lectured at the Saint John Law School (now the law faculty of the University of New Brunswick).

He ran unsuccessfully for a seat in the federal parliament in 1878, 1882, 1883 and 1887 and again in 1890 for the provincial assembly. He was finally elected in an 1892 by-election. McInerney was defeated in bids for reelection in 1900 and 1904; he also ran unsuccessfully for a seat in the provincial assembly in 1903.

McInerney was trustee and, for a time, co-editor of the Catholic newspaper, the Freeman. He died in Saint John at the age of 50.

His son Ralph also served in the provincial assembly.

== Electoral record ==
1900 Canadian federal election: Kent
Party	Candidate	Votes	%	±%
Liberal	Olivier J. Leblanc	2,447	57.4	+14.8
Conservative	George McInerney	1,816	42.6	-14.8

1896 Canadian federal election: Kent
Party	Candidate	Votes	%	±%
Conservative	George McInerney	2,041	57.4	-5.6
Liberal	Olivier J. Leblanc	1,514	42.6	+5.6

By-election on December 6, 1892
Party	Candidate	Votes
Conservative	George McInerney	acclaimed

1887 Canadian federal election: Kent
Party	Candidate	Votes	%	±%
Conservative	Pierre-Amand Landry	1,765	55.5	-4.3
Liberal	George McInerney	1,100	44.5	+4.3

By-election on September 22, 1883
Party	Candidate	Votes
Conservative	Kent (New Brunswick federal electoral district)	Kent	Pierre-Amand Landry	1,638	59.8	-4.8
Liberal	George McInerney	1,100	40.2	+4.8

1882 Canadian federal election: Kent
Party	Candidate	Votes	%	±%
Conservative	Gilbert Anselme Girouard	1,412	64.6	
Liberal	George McInerney	773	35.4	

1878 Canadian federal election: Kent
Party	Candidate	Votes	%	±%
Conservative	Gilbert Anselme Girouard	810	29.9	
Liberal	Robert Barry Cutler	726	26.8	
Independent	George McLeod	510	18.8	
Unknown	H. O'Leary	382	14.1	
Liberal	George McInerney	280	10.3	
