= Kent (New Brunswick federal electoral district) =

Former federal electoral district in New Brunswick, Canada

New Brunswick electoral district

Defunct federal electoral district
- Legislature: House of Commons
- District created: 1867
- District abolished: 1966
- First contested: 1867
- Last contested: 1965

Demographics
- Census division: Kent

Kent was a federal electoral district in New Brunswick, Canada, that was represented in the House of Commons of Canada from 1867 to 1968. It was created by the British North America Act 1867.

It consisted of the County of Kent. It was abolished in 1966 when it was redistributed into Northumberland—Miramichi and Westmorland—Kent ridings.

== Members of Parliament ==
This riding elected the following members of Parliament:

Parliament	Years	Member	Party
Kent
1st	1867–1872	Auguste Renaud	Liberal
2nd	1872–1874	Robert Barry Cutler	Liberal
3rd	1874–1878	George McLeod	Independent
4th	1878–1882	Gilbert Anselme Girouard	Liberal–Conservative
5th	1882–1883	Gilbert Anselme Girouard	Liberal–Conservative
5th	1883–1887	Pierre-Amand Landry	Conservative
6th	1887–1890	Pierre-Amand Landry	Conservative
6th	1890–1891	Édouard-H. Léger	Conservative
7th	1891–1892	Édouard-H. Léger	Conservative
7th	1892–1896	George Valentine McInerney	Conservative
8th	1896–1900	George Valentine McInerney	Conservative
9th	1900–1904	Olivier J. Leblanc	Liberal
10th	1904–1908	Olivier J. Leblanc	Liberal
11th	1908–1911	Olivier J. Leblanc	Liberal
12th	1911–1917	Ferdinand-Joseph Robidoux	Conservative
13th	1917–1921	Auguste Théophile Léger	Opposition (Laurier Liberals)
14th	1921–1923	Auguste Théophile Léger	Liberal
14th	1923–1925	Alexandre-Joseph Doucet	Conservative
15th	1925–1926	Alexandre-Joseph Doucet	Conservative
16th	1926–1930	Alfred Edmond Bourgeois	Liberal
17th	1930–1935	Télesphore Arsenault	Conservative
18th	1935–1940	Louis-Prudent-Alexandre Robichaud	Liberal
19th	1940–1945	Aurel Léger	Liberal
20th	1945–1949	Aurel Léger	Liberal
21st	1949–1953	Aurel Léger	Liberal
22nd	1953–1957	Hervé Michaud	Liberal
23rd	1957–1958	Hervé Michaud	Liberal
24th	1958–1962	Hervé Michaud	Liberal
25th	1962–1963	Guy Crossman	Liberal
26th	1963–1965	Guy Crossman	Liberal
27th	1965–1968	Guy Crossman	Liberal
Riding dissolved into Westmorland—Kent and Northumberland—Miramichi

== Election results ==
1965 Canadian federal election
Party	Candidate	Votes	%	±%
Liberal	Guy Crossman	5,713	59.9	+0.2
Progressive Conservative	Wilfred Bourgeois	2,306	24.2	-6.8
New Democratic	George Robertson	1,512	15.9	+13.6

1963 Canadian federal election
Party	Candidate	Votes	%	±%
Liberal	Guy Crossman	5,971	59.7	+8.6
Progressive Conservative	Lionel Mills	3,095	31.0	-9.5
Social Credit	Langis Robichaud	705	7.1	+2.8
New Democratic	Antoine Leger	226	2.3	*

1962 Canadian federal election
Party	Candidate	Votes	%	±%
Liberal	Guy Crossman	5,514	51.1	-4.3
Progressive Conservative	Lionel Mills	4,366	40.5	-4.1
Social Credit	George Robichaud	464	4.3	*
Independent	Edmond Bourgeois	441	4.1	*

1958 Canadian federal election
Party	Candidate	Votes	%	±%
Liberal	Hervé Michaud	6,118	55.4	-2.4
Progressive Conservative	Louis LeBlanc	4,988	44.6	+2.4

1957 Canadian federal election
Party	Candidate	Votes	%	±%
Liberal	Hervé Michaud	6,424	57.8	-8.3
Progressive Conservative	Louis LeBlanc	4,682	42.2	+8.3

1953 Canadian federal election
Party	Candidate	Votes	%	±%
Liberal	Hervé Michaud	7,039	66.1	+17.1
Progressive Conservative	Emile Verret	3,603	33.9	+12.6

1949 Canadian federal election
Party	Candidate	Votes	%	±%
Liberal	Aurel Léger	5,754	49.0	-16.0
Independent	Alfred Bourgeois	3,084	26.3	*
Progressive Conservative	Wilfred Bourgeois	2,496	21.3	-8.1
Co-operative Commonwealth	Ernest Cormier	406	3.5	-2.1

1945 Canadian federal election
Party	Candidate	Votes	%	±%
Liberal	Aurel Léger	6,835	65.0	+0.2
Progressive Conservative	Alexandre-Joseph Doucet	3,032	29.4	-5.8
Co-operative Commonwealth	Alcide LeBlanc	584	5.6	*

1940 Canadian federal election
Party	Candidate	Votes	%	±%
Liberal	Aurel Léger	5,582	64.8	-3.4
National Government	Télesphore Arsenault	3,032	35.2	+18.5

1935 Canadian federal election
Party	Candidate	Votes	%	±%
Liberal	Louis P. Robichaud	6,504	68.2	+20.2
Conservative	Télesphore Arsenault	4,884	16.7	-35.3
Independent	Alexandre-Joseph Doucet	1,442	15.1	*

1930 Canadian federal election
Party	Candidate	Votes	%	±%
Conservative	Télesphore Arsenault	4,884	52.0	+5.4
Liberal	Alfred Bourgeois	4,504	48.0	-5.4
Source(s) "Kent, New Brunswick (1867 - 1966)". History of Federal Ridings Since 1867. Library of Parliament. Archived from the original on 22 October 2012.

1926 Canadian federal election
Party	Candidate	Votes	%	±%
Liberal	Alfred Edmond Bourgeois	4,799	53.5	+9.1
Conservative	Alexandre-Joseph Doucet	4,173	46.5	-9.1
Source(s) "Kent, New Brunswick (1867 - 1966)". History of Federal Ridings Since 1867. Library of Parliament. Archived from the original on 22 October 2012.

1925 Canadian federal election
Party	Candidate	Votes	%	±%
Conservative	Alexandre-Joseph Doucet	4,427	55.6	+4.1
Liberal	Louis P. Robichaud	3,534	44.4	-4.1

By-election on 20 December 1923
Party	Candidate	Votes
Conservative	Alexandre-Joseph Doucet	3,643	51.5	+11.4
Liberal	Alfred Bourgeois	3,435	48.5	-11.4

1921 Canadian federal election
Party	Candidate	Votes	%	±%
Liberal	Auguste Théophile Léger	4,626	59.9	-13.0
Conservative	Alexandre Joseph Doucet	3,103	40.1	+13.0

1917 Canadian federal election
Party	Candidate	Votes	%	±%
Opposition (Laurier Liberals)	Auguste Théophile Léger	3,563	72.9	+25.2
Government (Unionist)	Ferdinand-Joseph Robidoux	1,323	27.1	-25.2

1911 Canadian federal election
Party	Candidate	Votes	%	±%
Conservative	Ferdinand-Joseph Robidoux	2,334	52.3	+10.4
Liberal	Olivier J. Leblanc	2,129	47.7	-10.4

1908 Canadian federal election
Party	Candidate	Votes	%	±%
Liberal	Olivier J. Leblanc	2,580	58.1	+8.6
Conservative	Ferdinand-Joseph Robidoux	1,860	41.9	-5.3

1904 Canadian federal election
Party	Candidate	Votes	%	±%
Liberal	Olivier J. Leblanc	2,078	49.5	-7.9
Conservative	George McInerney	1,979	47.2	+4.6
Independent Liberal	Pascal Herbert	138	3.3	*

1900 Canadian federal election
Party	Candidate	Votes	%	±%
Liberal	Olivier J. Leblanc	2,447	57.4	+14.8
Conservative	George McInerney	1,816	42.6	-14.8

1896 Canadian federal election
Party	Candidate	Votes	%	±%
Conservative	George McInerney	2,041	57.4	-5.6
Liberal	Olivier J. Leblanc	1,514	42.6	+5.6

By-election on 6 December 1892
Party	Candidate	Votes
Conservative	George McInerney	acclaimed

1891 Canadian federal election
Party	Candidate	Votes	%	±%
Conservative	Édouard H. Léger	1,722	63.0	+7.5
Liberal	Olivier J. Leblanc	1,011	37.0	-7.5

By-election on 31 July 1890
Party	Candidate	Votes
Conservative	Édouard H. Léger	acclaimed

1887 Canadian federal election
Party	Candidate	Votes	%	±%
Conservative	Pierre-Amand Landry	1,765	55.5	-4.3
Liberal	George McInerney	1,100	44.5	+4.3

By-election on 22 September 1883
Party	Candidate	Votes
Conservative	Pierre-Amand Landry	1,638	59.8	-4.8
Liberal	George McInerney	1,100	40.2	+4.8

1882 Canadian federal election
Party	Candidate	Votes	%	±%
Conservative	Gilbert Anselme Girouard	1,412	64.6	
Liberal	George McInerney	773	35.4	

1878 Canadian federal election
Party	Candidate	Votes	%	±%
Conservative	Gilbert Anselme Girouard	810	29.9	
Liberal	Robert Barry Cutler	726	26.8	
Independent	George McLeod	510	18.8	
Unknown	H. O'Leary	382	14.1	
Liberal	George McInerney	280	10.3	

1874 Canadian federal election
Party	Candidate	Votes	%	±%
Independent	George McLeod	1,570	59.4	
Liberal	Auguste Renaud	1,256	40.6	
lop.parl.ca

1872 Canadian federal election
Party	Candidate	Votes	%	±%
Liberal	Robert Barry Cutler	1,381	52.4	
Liberal	Auguste Renaud	1,256	47.6	
Source: Canadian Elections Database

1867 Canadian federal election
Party	Candidate	Votes	%	Elected
Liberal	Auguste Renaud	2,225	64.1	✓
Unknown	Lestock P. W. DesBrisay	757	21.8	
Unknown	Owen McInerney	485	14.0	
Unknown	Robert Barry Cutler	4	0.2	
Source: Canadian Elections Database

== See also ==
- List of Canadian electoral districts
- Historical federal electoral districts of Canada
