= Jean Baptiste Gogain =

Former Canadian politician

Member of the Legislative Assembly of New Brunswick
- In office 1903–1908 Serving with James Barnes, Urbain Johnson
- In office 1892–1895 Serving with James D. Phinney
- Constituency: Kent

Personal details
- Born: November 13, 1858 Cocagne, New Brunswick
- Party: Conservative
- Spouse: Celina Bourgeois (m. 1880)
- Children: 6
- Occupation: Merchant

Jean Baptiste Gogain (born November 13, 1858), also known as Jean-Baptiste Goguen or Gueguen, was a Canadian politician. He served in the Legislative Assembly of New Brunswick from 1892 to 1895 and 1903 to 1908 as a Conservative member.
