= Gilbert Anselme Girouard =

Canadian politician (1846–1885)

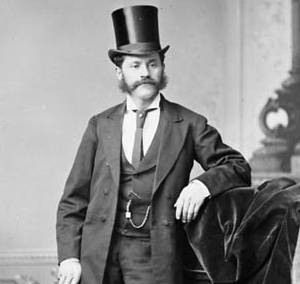

Member of the Canadian Parliament for Kent
- In office 1878–1883
- Preceded by: George McLeod
- Succeeded by: Pierre-Amand Landry

Personal details
- Born: October 26, 1846 Bouctouche, New Brunswick, Canada
- Died: January 13, 1885 (aged 38)
- Cause of death: tuberculosis
- Party: Liberal-Conservative

Gilbert Anselme Girouard (October 26, 1846 – January 13, 1885) was a general merchant and political figure in New Brunswick, Canada. He represented Kent in the House of Commons of Canada from 1878 to 1883 as a Liberal-Conservative member.

He was born in Ste-Marie de Buctouche, New Brunswick, and educated at St. Joseph's College in Memramcook. He taught school briefly in Sainte-Marie-de-Kent before becoming a general merchant in Buctouche in 1870. In 1872, he married Sophia Baker. Girouard resigned his seat in 1883 to accept the position of customs collector for Richibucto. He died of tuberculosis in Buctouche at the age of 38.

== Electoral record ==
1887 Canadian federal election: Kent
Party	Candidate	Votes	%	±%
Conservative	Pierre-Amand Landry	1,765	55.5	-4.3
Liberal	George McInerney	1,100	44.5	+4.3

By-election on September 22, 1883
Party	Candidate	Votes
Conservative	Kent (New Brunswick federal electoral district)	Kent	Pierre-Amand Landry	1,638	59.8	-4.8
Liberal	George McInerney	1,100	40.2	+4.8

1882 Canadian federal election: Kent
Party	Candidate	Votes	%	±%
Conservative	Gilbert Anselme Girouard	1,412	64.6	
Liberal	George McInerney	773	35.4	

1878 Canadian federal election: Kent
Party	Candidate	Votes	%	±%
Conservative	Gilbert Anselme Girouard	810	29.9	
Liberal	Robert Barry Cutler	726	26.8	
Independent	George McLeod	510	18.8	
Unknown	H. O'Leary	382	14.1	
Liberal	George McInerney	280	10.3	
