= Alfred Edmond Bourgeois =

Canadian politician

Member of the Canadian Parliament for Kent
- In office 1926–1930
- Preceded by: Alexandre-Joseph Doucet
- Succeeded by: Télesphore Arsenault

Personal details
- Born: October 26, 1872 Cocagne, New Brunswick, Canada
- Died: January 24, 1939 (aged 66)
- Party: Liberal
- Occupation: Clerk landlord merchant

Alfred Edmond Bourgeois (October 26, 1872 – January 24, 1939) was a Canadian Liberal Party politician who represented the riding of Kent. He ran in the Kent by-election in 1923 and 1930 but was defeated in both.

1930 Canadian federal election: Kent
Party	Candidate	Votes	%	±%
Conservative	Télesphore Arsenault	4,884	52.0	+5.4
Liberal	Alfred Bourgeois	4,504	48.0	-5.4
Source(s) "Kent, New Brunswick (1867 - 1966)". History of Federal Ridings Since 1867. Library of Parliament. Archived from the original on 22 October 2012.

1926 Canadian federal election: Kent
Party	Candidate	Votes	%	±%
Liberal	Alfred Edmond Bourgeois	4,799	53.5	+9.1
Conservative	Alexandre-Joseph Doucet	4,173	46.5	-9.1
Source(s) "Kent, New Brunswick (1867 - 1966)". History of Federal Ridings Since 1867. Library of Parliament. Archived from the original on 22 October 2012.

By-election on December 20, 1923
Party	Candidate	Votes
Conservative	Alexandre-Joseph Doucet	3,643	51.5	+11.4
Liberal	Alfred Bourgeois	3,435	48.5	-11.4
