= Ləgər =

Ləgər or Leger may refer to:

- Aşağı Ləgər (disambiguation), multiple locations in Azerbaijan
- Yuxarı Ləgər, Azerbaijan
