= Louis Cunningham =

Canadian author (1900-1954)

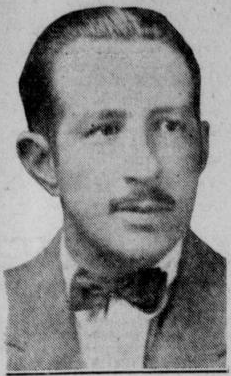
- Born: Louis Arthur Cunningham; September 28, 1900; Saint John, New Brunswick, Canada
- Died: June 13, 1954 (aged 53); Hammond River, New Brunswick
- Education: University of St. Joseph's College (B.A., M.A.)
- Occupation: Writer
- Spouse: Hortense Marie Mooney

Louis Arthur Cunningham (September 28, 1900 – June 13, 1954) was a Canadian author from Saint John, New Brunswick. Throughout his career, he published 31 novels as well as over 500 short stories. He has been described as a "prolific writer" in Atlantic Canada. His literature has been featured in several periodicals throughout North America and Europe.

== Early life and career ==
Cunningham was born on September 28, 1900, to parents William John Cunningham and Sarah (née McGrath) Cunningham. He attended Saint John High School, which he graduated from in 1918. In 1922, he graduated from the University of St. Joseph's College with a bachelor of arts, and obtained his master's degree the following year. In 1923, he received a Knights of Columbus' graduate scholarship from the Catholic University of America from Washington, D.C., where he was set to pursue his PhD at the university starting September 1973. During his time spent at the Catholic University of America, he taught English, French and Latin. The following year, he taught the same subjects at the Notre Dame University in Indiana for another year.

== Career ==
In 1925, Cunningham returned to Saint John to pursue a career in writing, starting with fiction work. He published his first work the same year, and in September 1927 he published his first novel, Yvon Tremblay, through Graphic Publishers of Ottawa. Works of his would be showcased in magazines such as Maclean's, Top-Notch Detective Stories and the Chicago News. In 1935, he published The Tides of the Tantramar. His novel The Forest Gate was published by the Philadelphia Inquirer in 1942.

== Personal life ==
Cunningham married Hortense Marie Mooney on July 10, 1929. They moved to a cottage in East Riverside, where Cunningham met and befriended fellow writers Hiram Alfred Cody and W. E. D. Ross. In 1934, the couple moved again to a house in Hammond River.

== Death ==
On June 13, 1954, Cunningham died at his Hammond River residence at the age of 53.

== Bibliography ==
- Yvon Tremblay (1927)
- Life of Lady Hamilton (1929)
- This Thing Called Love (1929)
- The King's Fool (1931)
- Tides of the Tantramar (1935)
- Fog over Fundy (1936)
- Moon Over Acadie (1937)
- Valley of the Stars (1938)
- Discords of the Deep (1938)
- Ove These Three Loves (1939)
- The Sign of the Burning Ship (1940)
- Marionette (1941)
- The Forest Gate (1946)
- The Wandering Heart (1947)
- Evergreen Cottage (1949)
- Wherever You Are (1950)
- In Quest of Even (1953)
- Beside the Laughing Water (1953)
- Key to Romance (1953)
- Should Thy Love Die (1954)
- Sweet Constancy (1955)
- The Lily Pool (1955)
- Meg Shannon's Story (1956)
- Stars Over Seven Oaks (1957)
- You Are the Dream (1958)
- Whisper to the Stars (1959)
- A Sunlit Grove (1959)
