= Ralph McInerney =

Canadian politician

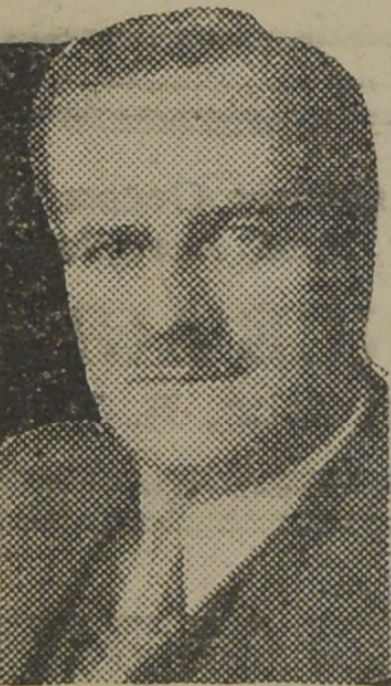
- McInerney, pictured in a 1935 newspaper

Member of the Legislative Assembly of New Brunswick
- In office 1939–1948
- Constituency: Saint John City

Personal details
- Born: 14 December 1897 Richibucto, New Brunswick
- Died: 26 July 1953 (aged 55) Rothesay, New Brunswick
- Party: Progressive Conservative Party of New Brunswick
- Spouse: Kathleen C. Coster
- Occupation: Lawyer

Ralph George McInerney (14 December 1897 – 26 July 1953) was a lawyer, insurance broker and political figure in New Brunswick, Canada. He represented the city of Saint John in the Legislative Assembly of New Brunswick from 1939 to 1948 as a Conservative member.

He was born in Richibucto, the son of George Valentine McInerney and Christina O'Leary, both of Irish descent. He was educated in Chatham and at Saint Dunstan's University. During World War I, he served as a lieutenant in the Canadian Expeditionary Force and then as a pilot in the Royal Flying Corps. McInerney was called to the Bar of New Brunswick in 1924. In 1930, he married Kathleen C. Coster. He died in 1953 at the age of 55.
