= Alexandre-Joseph Doucet =

Canadian politician

Member of the Canadian Parliament for Kent
- In office 1923–1926
- Preceded by: Auguste Théophile Léger
- Succeeded by: Alfred Edmond Bourgeois

Personal details
- Born: November 1, 1880 Grand-Étang, Nova Scotia
- Died: July 28, 1951 (aged 70) Moncton, New Brunswick
- Party: Conservative

Alexandre-Joseph Doucet (November 1, 1880 – July 28, 1951) was a farmer and political figure in New Brunswick, Canada. He represented Kent in the House of Commons of Canada from 1923 to 1926 as a Conservative.

He was born in Grand Étang, Nova Scotia, the son of Joseph-Romuald Doucet and Sophie Le Blanc. Doucet was a farmer at Notre-Dame, Kent County. In 1903, he married Philomène Le Blanc. Doucet ran unsuccessfully for a seat in the House of Commons in 1921. He was first elected to the House of Commons in a 1923 by-election held following the death of Auguste Théophile Léger. He served on the municipal council for Dundas from 1923 to 1925. Doucet was defeated when he ran for reelection in 1926, 1935 and 1945. He was a director of the Potato Grower's Association of New Brunswick and auditor for the Farmer's Co-operative Creamery of Moncton. Doucet died in Moncton at the age of 70.

== Electoral record ==
1945 Canadian federal election: Kent
Party	Candidate	Votes	%	±%
Liberal	Aurel Léger	6,835	65.0	+0.2
Progressive Conservative	Alexandre-Joseph Doucet	3,032	29.4	-5.8
Co-operative Commonwealth	Alcide LeBlanc	584	5.6	*

1935 Canadian federal election: Kent
Party	Candidate	Votes	%	±%
Liberal	Louis P. Robichaud	6,504	68.2	+20.2
Conservative	Télesphore Arsenault	4,884	16.7	-35.3
Independent	Alexandre-Joseph Doucet	1,442	15.1	*

1926 Canadian federal election: Kent
Party	Candidate	Votes	%	±%
Liberal	Alfred Edmond Bourgeois	4,799	53.5	+9.1
Conservative	Alexandre-Joseph Doucet	4,173	46.5	-9.1
Source(s) "Kent, New Brunswick (1867 - 1966)". History of Federal Ridings Since 1867. Library of Parliament. Archived from the original on 22 October 2012.

1925 Canadian federal election: Kent
Party	Candidate	Votes	%	±%
Conservative	Alexandre-Joseph Doucet	4,427	55.6	+4.1
Liberal	Louis P. Robichaud	3,534	44.4	-4.1

By-election on December 20, 1923
Party	Candidate	Votes
Conservative	Alexandre-Joseph Doucet	3,643	51.5	+11.4
Liberal	Alfred Bourgeois	3,435	48.5	-11.4
