= Ledger (disambiguation) =

A ledger is an accounting book for recording accounting transactions.

Ledger may also refer to:

== Publications ==
- The Ledger, a Florida newspaper
- Ledger (journal), a peer-reviewed journal on cryptocurrency
- Antioch Daily Ledger, a California newspaper
- Jewish Ledger, a Connecticut newspaper
- Ledger-Enquirer, an Ohio newspaper
- Monadnock Ledger, a New Hampshire newspaper
- Monadnock Ledger-Transcript, a New Hampshire newspaper
- The Patriot Ledger, a Massachusetts newspaper
- Public Ledger (Philadelphia), a Pennsylvania newspaper
- The Star-Ledger, a New Jersey newspaper
- New York Ledger, a fictional tabloid in the Law & Order franchise

== Technology ==
- Distributed ledger
- Ledger (software)
- SQL-Ledger

== Art ==
- The Ledger Awards, in Australian comic art and publishing
- Ledger line, a tool of musical notation
- Ledger, a solo project for Skillet drummer Jen Ledger

== Other uses ==
- General ledger
- Ledger (surname)
- Ledger stone, a flat stone slab covering a grave
- In construction a ledger is a horizontal support such as in scaffolding
- Ledger, a paper size

== See also ==
- Leger (disambiguation)
