= Pierre-Amand Landry =

Canadian politician (1846–1916)

The Honourable Sir Pierre-Amand Landry KC
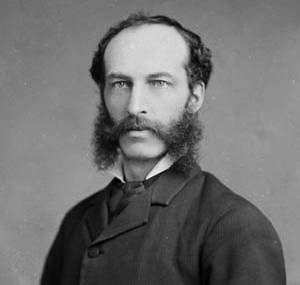

Member of the Canadian Parliament for Kent
- In office 1883–1890
- Preceded by: Gilbert Anselme Girouard
- Succeeded by: Édouard H. Léger

Member of the Legislative Assembly of New Brunswick for Westmorland County
- In office 1870–1874
- In office 1878–1883

Personal details
- Born: May 1, 1846 Memramcook, New Brunswick
- Died: July 28, 1916 (aged 70) Dorchester, New Brunswick, Canada
- Party: Conservative
- Relations: Amand Landry, father

Sir Pierre-Amand Landry, KC (May 1, 1846 – July 28, 1916) was an Acadian lawyer, judge and political figure in New Brunswick. He represented Westmorland County in the Legislative Assembly of New Brunswick from 1870 to 1874 and from 1878 to 1883. He represented Kent in the House of Commons of Canada from 1883 to 1890 as a Conservative member.

== Early life and education ==
He was born in Memramcook, New Brunswick, the son of Amand Landry and Pélagie Caissie, and was educated in Memramcook and Fredericton. He taught school for a time, articled in the law office of Albert James Smith and was called to the bar in 1871, becoming the first Acadian lawyer in the province.

== Legal career ==
Landry set up practice in Dorchester. In 1872, he married Bridget Annie McCarthy. In 1875, he helped defend nine Acadians charged with killing an English protester at a demonstration by Acadians against a public school tax. Landry served in the province's Executive Council as Commissioner of Public Works from 1878 to 1882 and provincial secretary from 1882 to 1883. As Commissioner of Public Works, he was responsible for the construction of a new provincial building for the assembly; the old building had burned in 1880. In 1881, he was named Queen's Counsel.

== Political career ==
Landry was elected to the House of Commons in an 1883 by-election after Gilbert-Anselme Girouard accepted the position of customs collector. In 1890, he was named judge in the county court of Westmorland and Kent and, in 1893, was appointed to the Supreme Court of New Brunswick. Landry was knighted in June 1916, the first and only Acadian to be so honoured. He died in Dorchester later that year at the age of 70.

=== Electoral record ===
1887 Canadian federal election: Kent
Party	Candidate	Votes	%	±%
Conservative	Pierre-Amand Landry	1,765	55.5	-4.3
Liberal	George McInerney	1,100	44.5	+4.3

By-election on September 22, 1883
Party	Candidate	Votes
Conservative	Kent (New Brunswick federal electoral district)	Kent	Pierre-Amand Landry	1,638	59.8	-4.8
Liberal	George McInerney	1,100	40.2	+4.8
