= Pierre H. Léger =

Canadian politician

Pierre H. Léger (July 15, 1858 – December 3, 1900) was a farmer, trader and political figure in New Brunswick, Canada. He represented Kent County in the Legislative Assembly of New Brunswick from 1896 to 1900 as a Conservative member.

He was born in Grande-Digue, New Brunswick and studied at the College of St. Joseph in Memramcook. Léger was a justice of the peace and served on the municipal council. He died in office in 1900.

Legislative Assembly of New Brunswick
| Preceded by Jean-Baptiste Goguen | MLA for Kent County; 1896–1900 | Succeeded by David-Vital Landry |
