= Auguste Bordage =

Canadian politician

Auguste Joseph Bordage (February 9, 1874 – January 14, 1945) was a general merchant and political figure in New Brunswick, Canada. He represented Kent County in the Legislative Assembly of New Brunswick as a Liberal member from 1917 to 1944.

He was born in Saint-Louis-de-Kent, New Brunswick, the son of Gilbert Bordage and Domiltide Maillet. He was educated at St. Joseph's College in Memramcook. In 1894, Bordage married Eléonore Barrieau.

His son Camille also served in the provincial assembly.
