= Ferdinand Robidoux =

Joseph Ferdinand Robidoux (1849 – 1921) was an Acadian Canadian writer, editor, and publisher who was the third publisher and owner of Le Moniteur Acadien. He served as the editor and publisher of Le Moniteur Acadien from 1871 until 1918, retiring after his son died of the Spanish Flu. He also wrote about the first, second, and third Acadian National Conventions, publishing a book with speeches and other content from them in 1907. His son is Canadian politician and lawyer Ferdinand-Joseph Robidoux.

In 1951, he was declared a Person of National Historic Significance as part of the Acadian Men of Letters. A plaque dedicated to them is located in Shediac, New Brunswick.
