= Amand Landry =

Canadian politician

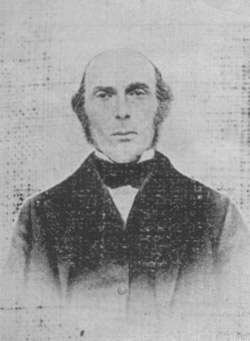
Amand Landry in 1870

Amand Landry (December 8, 1805 – July 12, 1877) was an Acadian farmer and political figure in New Brunswick. He represented Westmorland County in the Legislative Assembly of New Brunswick from 1846 to 1850, from 1853 to 1857 and from 1861 to 1870.

He was born in Memramcook, New Brunswick, the son of Allain Landry and Anastasie Dupuis, and was educated there. His mother was a descendant of Charles de Saint-Étienne de la Tour who had been governor of Acadia. Landry taught school for a time. He married Pélagie Caissie in 1839. He was defeated by William Crane in 1850 but was elected in a by-election held in 1853 after Crane died. Landry opposed Confederation and railway construction, viewing both as not benefiting Acadians. He died in Memramcook at the age of 71.

His son Pierre-Amand served in the provincial assembly and the Canadian House of Commons.
