= Pascal Poirier =

Canadian politician (1852–1933)

The Honourable Pascal Poirier
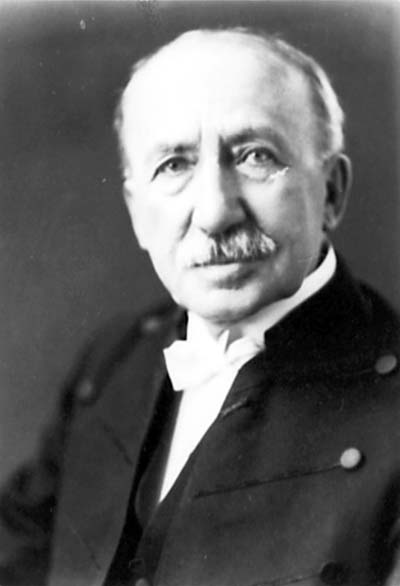

Senator for L'Acadie, New Brunswick
- In office March 9, 1885 – September 25, 1933

Personal details
- Born: February 15, 1852 Shediac, New Brunswick
- Died: September 25, 1933 (aged 81)
- Party: Liberal-Conservative

Pascal Poirier (February 15, 1852 – September 25, 1933) was a Canadian author, lawyer, and the all-time longest-serving Senator.

Born in Shediac, New Brunswick, in a big family, he attended College Saint Joseph in Memramcook, New Brunswick. At an early age he wrote a book on the Origin of Acadians, a history that contradicted myths of the time. He also wrote multiple articles and a glossary of the Acadian French language. After finishing school at the College Saint-Joseph in Memramcook during 1872, Poirier was appointed Postmaster of the Dominion Parliament at age 20. He held that position until he was appointed to the Senate thirteen years later.

Poirier was the first Acadian appointed to the Senate of Canada. He was appointed in 1885 and served for 48 years, 6 months, and 17 days until his death in 1933. The Constitution of Canada requires new senators to be at least 30 years old, and senators appointed since 1965 are required to retire from the Senate at age 75. This means that current Senate rules impose an eligibility limit of 45 years so that Poirier's record can not be exceeded.

The Pascal Poirier House (built c. 1820–1830) was designated a Provincial Historic Site under the Historic Sites Protection Act. The home he was born in has been preserved as a museum and as an important and rare example of early-19th-century Acadian residential construction. The 1 1/2-storey gabled house, which features a hand-hewn structure, is believed to be the oldest building in Shediac.

He was honored as a Chevalier de la Légion d'Honneur by France in 1902.

In 1954, he was declared a Person of National Historic Significance as part of the Acadian Men of Letters. Their plaque is located in Shediac.

== Selected bibliography ==
- Le Glossaire acadien
- L'Origine des Acadiens (1874)
- Les Acadiens de Philadelphie (1875)
- Le Père Lefebvre et l'Acadie (1898)
- Le Parler franco-acadien et ses origines (1928)
