= Aşağı Ləgər, Qusar =

Aşağı Ləgər
- Municipality
- Location within Azerbaijan
- Coordinates: 41°29′51″N 48°27′14″E
- Country: Azerbaijan
- Rayon: Qusar

Population
  - Total: 1,725
- Time zone: UTC+4 (AZT)
  - Summer (DST): UTC+5 (AZT)

Aşağı Ləgər (also, Ashaga-Leger, Ashagy-Leger, Ashagy-Lyagyar, and Ash-Leger) is a village and municipality in the Qusar Rayon of Azerbaijan. It has a population of 1,725.

== Archaeological excavations ==
Medieval settlements were discovered in the village during archaeological excavations in 1953 and the 1970s.
