= Silviane Léger =

French sculptor (1935–2012)

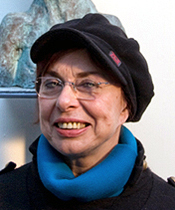
- Born: Silviane Yvonne Laure Léger; 22 May 1935; Lille, Hauts-de-France, France
- Died: 9 February 2012 (aged 76); Tourcoing, Hauts-de-France, France
- Other names: Silviane Leger, Sylviane Leger
- Education: École nationale supérieure des arts et industries textiles, École des beaux-arts de Lille
- Occupation: Sculptor

Silviane Léger (22 May 1935 – 9 February 2012) was a French sculptor. She is known for her monumental figurative and expressive public sculptures.

== Biography ==
Silviane Léger was born on 22 May 1935, in Lille in Hauts-de-France, France. She studied for one year at École nationale supérieure des arts et industries textiles (ENSAIT) in Roubaix, France; followed by four years of study at École des beaux-arts de Lille in Lille, France.

She died on 9 February 2012, in Tourcoing, France.

== List of works ==
- The Man with the Child (French: L'Homme à l'Enfant; 1981), Square Simons Park, Faches-Thumesnil, France
- The Paternity (French: La Paternité; 1983), Pont de Bois metro station, Villeneuve-d'Ascq, France
- The Standing Pieta (French: La Piéta debout; 1988), La Piscine Museum, Roubaix, France
- The Miner (French: Le Mineur; 2011), Town Hall, Auby, France
