= Auguste Renaud =

Canadian politician

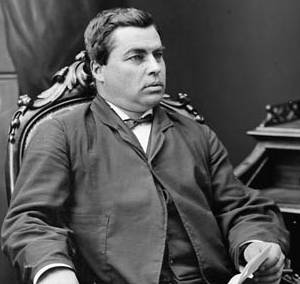

Member of the Canadian Parliament for Kent
- In office 1867–1872
- Succeeded by: Robert Barry Cutler

Personal details
- Born: October 18, 1835 Bordeaux, France
- Died: July 7, 1897 (aged 61)
- Party: Liberal

Auguste Renaud (October 18, 1835 – July 7, 1897) was a New Brunswick farmer and political figure. He represented Kent in the 1st Canadian Parliament as a Liberal member and was the first Acadian elected to the House of Commons.

He was born in Bordeaux, France in 1835 and settled near Bouctouche, New Brunswick around 1850. In 1862, he married Cécile Léger. After his term in office, he served as customs collector at Bouctouche until 1891. He died in Fond-de-la-Baie near Bouctouche in 1897.

Renaud was the first francophone from the Maritimes to sit in the House of Commons.

== Electoral record ==
1872 Canadian federal election: Kent
| Party | Candidate | Votes | % | ±% |
|---|---|---|---|---|
| Liberal | Robert Barry Cutler | 1,381 | 52.4 | |
| Liberal | Auguste Renaud | 1,256 | 47.6 | |
Source: Canadian Elections Database

1867 Canadian federal election: Kent
| Party | Candidate | Votes | % | Elected |
|---|---|---|---|---|
| Liberal | Auguste Renaud | 2,225 | 64.1 | ✓ |
| Unknown | Lestock P. W. DesBrisay | 757 | 21.8 | |
| Unknown | Owen McInerney | 485 | 14.0 | |
| Unknown | Robert Barry Cutler | 4 | 0.2 | |
Source: Canadian Elections Database
