= Francis McPhelim =

Canadian politician

Francis McPhelim (1811 – October 14, 1866) was an Irish-born merchant and politician. He represented Kent County in the Legislative Assembly of New Brunswick from 1850 to 1865.

He was born in Donegal, the son of Peter and Catherine McPhelim, and came to Buctouche, New Brunswick with his family in 1821. He went into business there as a merchant and shipper. In 1839, he married Rosanna McGuirk. McPhelim served in the province's Executive Council as postmaster general, becoming the first Roman Catholic member of the council. He supported the Intercolonial Railway and did not support Confederation. After he was defeated in 1865, he was named high sheriff for Kent County. McPhelim died in Buctouche the following year.
