= Camille Bordage =

Canadian politician

Member of the Legislative Assembly of New Brunswick
- In office 1964–1967
- Succeeded by: Allen Graham
- Constituency: Kent

Personal details
- Born: Ste. Ignace, New Brunswick; March 25, 1905 Saint-Louis-de-Kent, New Brunswick
- Died: July 12, 1997 (aged 92) Sainte-Anne-de-Kent, New Brunswick
- Party: New Brunswick Liberal Association
- Spouse(s): Gertrude Peche and Audrey Graham
- Children: Claude Bordage, Vernon Bordage, Huguette (Bordage) Johnson, Carmen Bordage, Camille Bordage Jr., Valdine (Bordage) Cormier), Charline (Bordage) Welling
- Occupation: businessman

Camille Bordage (March 25, 1905 – July 12, 1997) was a Canadian politician. He served in the Legislative Assembly of New Brunswick from 1964 to 1967 as member of the Liberal party.
