= Édouard H. Léger =

Canadian politician

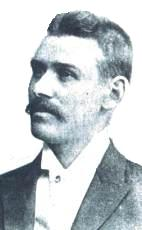

Member of the Canadian Parliament for Kent
- In office 1890–1892
- Preceded by: Pierre-Amand Landry
- Succeeded by: George Valentine McInerney

Personal details
- Born: April 23, 1866 Grande-Digue, New Brunswick
- Died: August 8, 1892 (aged 26)
- Party: Conservative
- Relations: 1

Édouard H. Léger (April 23, 1866 – August 8, 1892) was a physician and political figure in New Brunswick, Canada. He represented Kent in the House of Commons of Canada from 1890 to 1892 as a Conservative member.

He was born in Grande-Digue, New Brunswick, son of Hypolite Léger. He taught at a school for one year before continuing his education at St. Joseph's College in Memramcook. In 1888, he graduated with an M.D. from the Detroit Medical College. Later that year, he married Élise Michaud. Léger was first elected to the House of Commons in an 1890 by-election held after Pierre-Amand Landry resigned his seat to accept an appointment as judge. He died in office at the age of 26.

== Electoral record ==
1891 Canadian federal election: Kent
Party	Candidate	Votes	%	±%
Conservative	Édouard H. Léger	1,722	63.0	+7.5
Liberal	Olivier J. Leblanc	1,011	37.0	-7.5
