= John Clarence Webster =

Canadian physician (1863–1950)

John Clarence Webster CMG FRSE FRSC
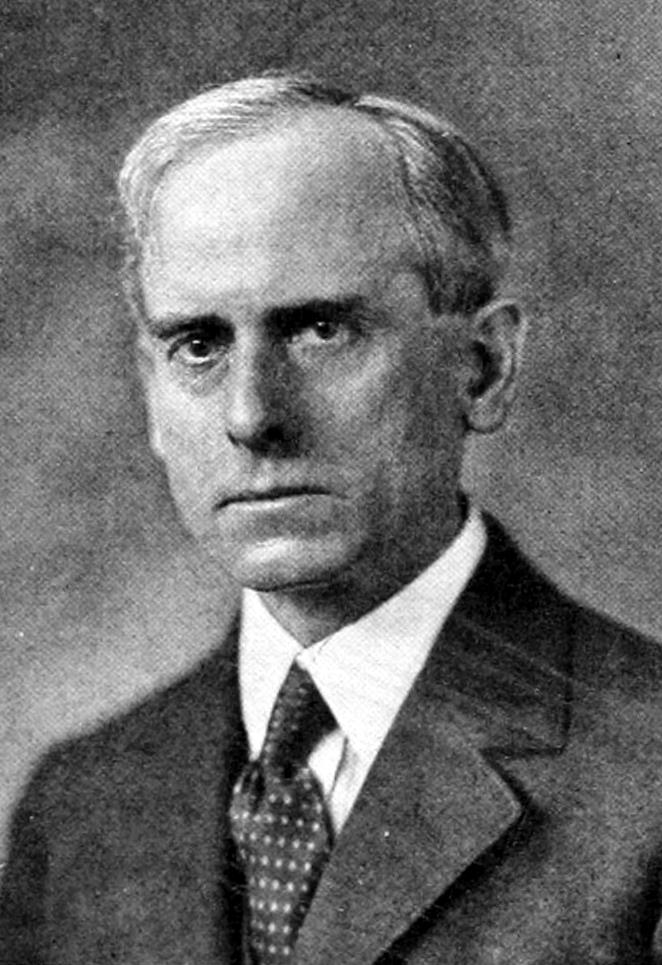
- Born: October 21, 1863; Shediac, New Brunswick, British North America
- Died: March 16, 1950 (aged 86); Shediac, New Brunswick, Canada
- Education: Mount Allison University; University of Edinburgh
- Medical career
- Field: Physician

John Clarence Webster CMG FRSE FRSC (21 October 1863 – 16 March 1950) was a Canadian physician, surgeon, and pioneer in Obstetrics and gynaecology, topics upon which he wrote several textbooks. After his retirement in 1920 he became a historian, specializing in the history of his native New Brunswick, and a supporter of efforts to preserve heritage and historic sites.

== Early life ==
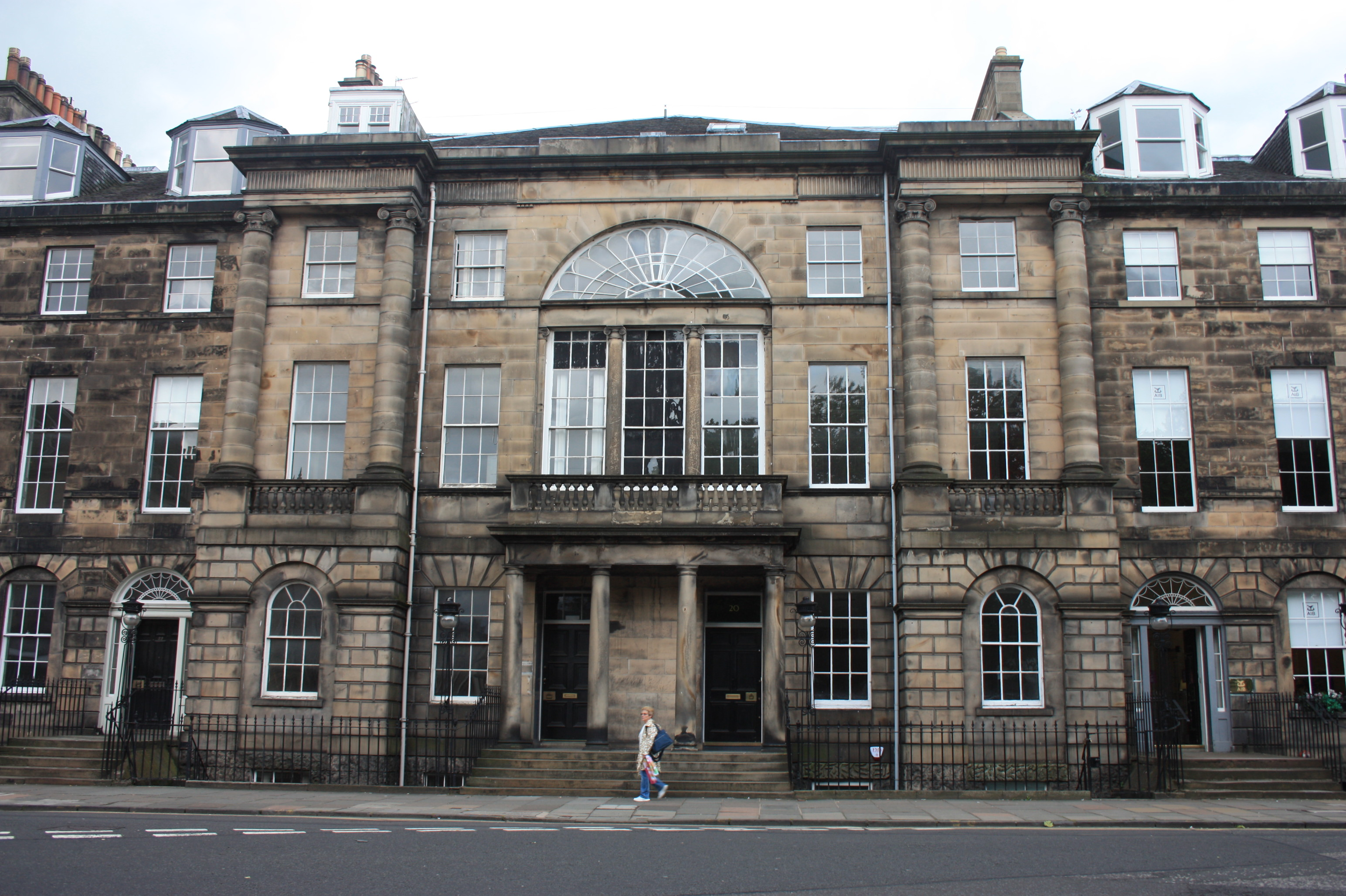
20 Charlotte Square

He was born on 21 October 1863, in Shediac, New Brunswick, the son of James Webster.

Webster was educated at Mount Allison College where he matriculated in 1878 and obtained a general Bachelor of Arts degree in 1882.

After graduating, in 1883 he went to Scotland where he began medical studies at the University of Edinburgh, graduating MB ChB in 1888. He then did further postgraduate studies in both Leipzig and Berlin. From 1884 he was working as an obstetrician at Minto House School of Medicine on Chambers Street in Edinburgh.

He obtained his doctorate (MD) in 1891.

Enormously successful, by 1895 he was living at 20 Charlotte Square, one of the most exclusive addresses in Edinburgh. This huge house was previously home to Sir John Batty Tuke.

In 1893 he was elected a Fellow of the Royal College of Physicians of Edinburgh. In January 1896 he was elected a Fellow of the Royal Society of Edinburgh. His proposers were Sir Alexander Russell Simpson, Sir William Turner, Sir Andrew Douglas Maclagan and Sir John Batty Tuke.

== Later life ==
=== Medical ===
In 1896, after thirteen years absence, he returned to Canada in 1896 and settled in Montreal where he was appointed Lecturer in Gynecology at McGill University and Assistant Gynecologist to the Royal Victoria Hospital. In Montreal, Webster assisted with the formation of the Jubilee Nursing Scheme, which later became the Victorian Order of Nurses.

Three years later, in 1899, he moved to Chicago where he had accepted the Chair of Obstetrics and Gynecology at Rush Medical College when it was affiliated with the University of Chicago. He also worked at various hospitals in Chicago, including Presbyterian Hospital, the Central Free Dispensary, and St Anthony's hospital. He also contributed to various medical journals and was one of the Editors-in-Chief of Surgery, Gynecology and Obstetrics. He was married to Alice Kussler Lusk, (1880–1953) of New York the same year he moved to Chicago. She was the daughter of the well known New York obstetrician named William Thompson Lusk. The couple had three children.

Webster became well known for his pioneering work in obstetrics and gynecology in Chicago, and soon rose to the position of Head of the Department. The Baldy-Webster Operation is named after him: Webster first described the method of treating retrodisplacement of the uterus in 1901 and James Montgomery Baldy modified it in 1903. The operation involved shortening the round ligaments, or Ligamenta rotunda. He also published an important text on women's diseases in 1907.

=== History ===
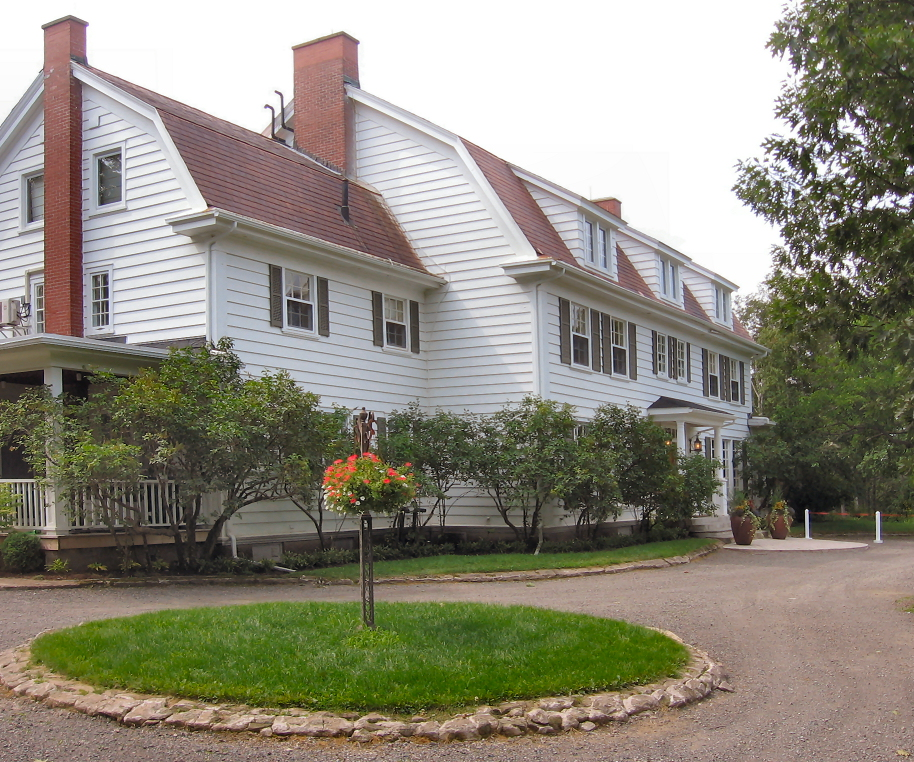
Webster's home in Shediac, New Brunswick. It was recently an inn, but is now again a private residence.

Webster retired from medicine in 1919 and returned to Shediac. There, he began work to record and popularize the history of New Brunswick. History had been a lifelong interest, and he was now able to devote his entire energies to the task. As a doctor, he had obtained the wealth and resources that enabled him to acquire important historical documents which had not yet been deposited in museums. Most of these documents were later donated to the New Brunswick Museum, Saint John, but before then, he used them to produce an important body of literature on the history of New Brunswick, Nova Scotia, and early Acadia (see list below). He was assisted by his wife in his work. For example, she translated various French language documents from the Acadian period, a difficult task given the archaic form of the language. A remarkable woman in her own right, Alice Webster was an important collector of art. She founded the Fine Arts Department of the New Brunswick Museum, created an endowment for the collection, and donated her own collection of regional and Asian art. She and Webster also acquired one of the most important artwork treasures in Canada, which portrays the death of James Wolfe in 1759, by James Barry and is on exhibition at the New Brunswick Museum.

Webster became a Trustee of the Public Archives of Nova Scotia, a Member of the Historic and Monuments Board of Canada, and the Honorary Curator of Fort Beausejour Museum, for which he was responsible. Apart from his writings which remain definitive sources on many subjects, it was with the Historic Sites and Monuments Board of Canada that he perhaps had his most lasting influence. Working with other members of the board, he surveyed the provinces of New Brunswick, Nova Scotia and Prince Edward Island and made recommendations for the commemoration of dozens of sites throughout New Brunswick and Nova Scotia with important historical relevance. Among these were:

- Fort Gaspareaux
- Fort Beauséjour
- Fort Anne
- Fort Louisbourg

Webster was instrumental is preserving Fort Beausejour, even going so far as to purchase the land underlying the fort, which he subsequently donated to the nation. He died in Shediac in 1950. The Webster Mansion was at one time a country inn.

== Personal life ==
Webster married Alice Lusk in 1899. They had three children.

The Webster children were in many ways as remarkable as their parents. The eldest son, J. C. Webster, Jr. (1901–1931), contributed to Canadian aviation history before dying at an early age. Daughter Janet married the French artist Camille Roche and lived in Europe. She was incarcerated under the Nazi regime and died in captivity in 1945. Her letters were published by her father in 1945. The youngest son, Dr. William L. Webster (1903–1975), was a physicist and mathematician who worked under Ernest Rutherford and Sir James Chadwick, and he was Secretary to the Manhattan Project.

On 16, March 1950, Webster died in Shediac, New Brunswick, aged 86.

== Awards and recognitions ==
- Commander of the Order of St. Michael and St. George
- Fellow of the Royal Society of Canada
- Five honorary degrees including an LLD from Mount Allison University.
- Mount Webster in Northumberland County, New Brunswick, was named for him
- Governor of Dalhousie University (1934).
- The Royal Society of Canada's J. B. Tyrrell Historical Medal (1934).
- In 1954 he was declared a Person of National Historic Significance as part of the Men of Letters.

== Published works ==
=== Medicine ===
- Barbour, A. H. F (Freeland) & J. C. Webster, Anatomy of Advanced Pregnancy and of Labour as Studied by Means of Frozen Sections and Casts, Volume II, Laboratory Reports Issued by the Royal College of Physicians, Edinburgh, 1890. *Researches in Female Pelvic Anatomy, Edinburgh 1892
- Ectopic Pregnancy. Its Etiology, Classification, Embryology, Diagnosis, and Treatment, New York: Macmillan, 1895
- Practical and Operative Gynecology, Edinburgh and London, Young J. Pentland, 1896 (PDF on Commons)
- Human Placentation: An Account of the Changes in the Uterine Mucosa and in the Attracted Fetal Structures During Pregnancy, Chicago: W.T. Keener & Co., 1901
- "Satisfactory operation for certain cases of retroversion of the uterus" in Journal of the American Medical Association, Chicago, 1901, 37: 913.
- Text-book of diseases of women, 1907

=== History ===
- Life of John Montresor (Royal Society of Canada, Ottawa, 1928. Reprint of 1894 Edition)
- History in a Government House (Shediac, N.B.: Privately printed, 1933). Paper read before the N.S. Historical Society on 1 April 1926.
- Joseph Frederick Wallet Desbarres and the Atlantic Neptune, Royal Society of Canada, Ottawa, 1927.
- Wolfiana: A Potpourri of Facts and Fantasies, Culled From Literature Relating to the Life of James Wolfe (Privately Printed, 1927)
- Samuel Vetch: An Address by Dr. J. Clarence Webster given on the occasion of the dedication of the monument to Vetch at Annapolis Royal, 22 September 1928 (Privately printed, 1929)
- Cornelis Steenwyck: Dutch Governor of Acadie (Privately printed, 1929).
- The Forts of Chignecto (Shediac, N.B.: Privately printed, 1930).
- Wolfe and the Artists: A Study of His Portraiture (Toronto: Ryerson Press, 1930).
- Relation of the Voyage to Port Royal in Acadia or New France (Toronto: Champlain Society 1933)
- The Life of Joseph Frederick Wallet Desbarres (Shediac, N.B.: Privately printed, 1933).
- The Career of the Abbe Le Loutre with his translated autobiography (Shediac, N.B.: Privately printed, 1933).
- Acadia at the End of the Seventeenth Century: Letters Journals and Memoirs of Joseph Robineau de Villebon, Commandant in Acadia, 1690–1700 and Other Contemporary Documents (Saint John: Monographic Series No. I, The New Brunswick Museum, 1934)
- The Siege of Beausejour in 1755: A Journal of the Attack on Beausejour written by Jacau De Fiedmont, Artillery Officer and Acting Engineer at the Fort (Saint John: Historical Studies No.1, Publications of the New Brunswick Museum, 1936). Translated by Alice Webster.
- Journals of Beausejour: Diary of John Thomas (Apr. 1755 to Dec 1755) and Journal of Louis de Courville (1755) edited by J. C. Webster (Halifax: Public Archives of Nova Scotia, 1937).
- The Life of Thomas Pichon, "The Spy of Beausejour" (Halifax: PANS, 1937).
- Historical Guide to New Brunswick (New Brunswick Government Bureau of Information and tourist Travel, 1940) There are also earlier editions of this book.
- Memorial on Behalf of Sieur de Boishebert (Saint John: Historical Studies No. 4, Publications of the New Brunswick Museum, 1942). Translated by Louise Manny; edited with introduction by Webster.
- The Catalogue of the John Clarence Webster Canadian Collection in three volumes (Saint John: catalogues No. 1, 2 & 3, New Brunswick Museum, 1939, 1946 & 1949)

=== Other ===
- The Distressed Maritimes : A Study of Educational and Cultural Conditions in Canada (Toronto: Ryerson Press, 1926)
- Those Crowded Years(Autobiography) (Shediac, N.B.: Privately printed, 1944)
- Wolfe and the Artists: A Study of His Portraiture (Toronto: Ryerson Press, 1930)
- The River St. John its Physical Features
- "Historical Renaissance in the Maritime Provinces and in British Columbia" with W. N. Sage (in Canadian Historical Review, 1936)
- Edinburgh Memories. And Robert Louis Stevenson
- A History of Shediac, New Brunswick
