= Dick Leger =

Richard Leger (April 18, 1925 – August 17, 1999) was an accomplished Square Dance Caller known as the 'Man with the Guitar'

== Early years ==
The youngest of 5 children, Dick lost his mother at a very early age and was raised by his stepmothers and older sister Vivian. His father, brothers, and sisters all worked at the Rhode Island Lace Works, one of the oldest lace factories in Rhode Island and Dick joined them at 18 and retired after 25 years. In 1944 he married Susan Durfee from East Providence, RI and they bought a house in Warren, Rhode Island, in a community called Laurel Park. While raising 6 children, Dick began calling at the Park casino on weekends and became the first and only caller of the Rhode Island Merry Makers. One of his first recordings Marianne became a hit and remained one of his most requested calls.

== Legacy ==
Leger was inducted into the International Square Dance Hall of Fame, Los Angeles, in 1978, and received the CALLERLAB Milestone Award, its highest award, in 1985. In 1994, he was named to the Square Dance Foundation of New England's Hall of Fame. In 1996, he and his wife Sue received the New England Square and Round Dance Cooperation Committee's Yankee Clipper Award.

He is fondly remembered in SQUARE & ROUND DANCE FEDERATION OF NOVA SCOTIA's Between tips article.

== Music ==
- He recorded 44 records and several albums over his 50-year career in calling.
- Square dancing: The American Way was one of a series of well-received teaching albums by Dick Leger and Patricia Phillips, Assistant Professor at State College at Bridgewater, Massachusetts.
