= André F. Richard =

Canadian politician

Member of the Legislative Assembly of New Brunswick
- In office 1957–1974
- Constituency: Kent

Personal details
- Born: December 16, 1906 Ste-Anne-de-Kent, New Brunswick
- Died: May 13, 1993 (aged 86) Bouctouche, New Brunswick
- Party: New Brunswick Liberal Association
- Spouse: Rosie Caissie
- Children: 8
- Occupation: Automobile Dealer & Pulpwood Dealer

André F. Richard (December 16, 1906 – May 13, 1993) was a Canadian politician. He served in the Legislative Assembly of New Brunswick from 1957 to 1974 as a member of the Liberal party.
