= Guy Crossman =

Canadian politician

Guy F. Crossman
- Official 1968 portrait

Member of Parliament for Kent
- In office June 1962 – June 1968

Member of Parliament for Westmorland—Kent
- In office June 1968 – September 1972

Personal details
- Born: 14 June 1915 Bouctouche, New Brunswick, Canada
- Died: 12 June 1989 (aged 73) Moncton, New Brunswick, Canada
- Party: Liberal
- Spouse(s): Rose-Alice LeBlanc m. 14 July 1940
- Profession: Contractor

Guy F. Crossman (14 June 1915 – 12 June 1989) was a Liberal party member of the House of Commons of Canada. Born and educated in Buctouche, New Brunswick, he was a contractor by career.

He was first elected at the Kent riding in the 1962 general election, then re-elected there in the 1963 and 1965 federal elections. In the 1968 election, he won the Westmorland—Kent electoral district. After serving his final term in the 28th Canadian Parliament, Crossman left the House of Commons and did not campaign in any further federal elections.

== Electoral record ==
1965 Canadian federal election: Kent
Party	Candidate	Votes	%	±%
Liberal	Guy Crossman	5,713	59.9	+0.2
Progressive Conservative	Wilfred Bourgeois	2,306	24.2	-6.8
New Democratic	George Robertson	1,512	15.9	+13.6

1963 Canadian federal election: Kent
Party	Candidate	Votes	%	±%
Liberal	Guy Crossman	5,971	59.7	+8.6
Progressive Conservative	Lionel Mills	3,095	31.0	-9.5
Social Credit	Langis Robichaud	705	7.1	+2.8
New Democratic	Antoine Leger	226	2.3	*

1962 Canadian federal election: Kent
Party	Candidate	Votes	%	±%
Liberal	Guy Crossman	5,514	51.1	-4.3
Progressive Conservative	Lionel Mills	4,366	40.5	-4.1
Social Credit	George Robichaud	464	4.3	*
Independent	Edmond Bourgeois	441	4.1	*
