= Hugh A. Dysart =

Canadian politician

Hugh Dysart

Member of the Legislative Assembly of New Brunswick
- In office 1952–1964
- Constituency: Kent

Personal details
- Born: October 12, 1896 Cocagne, New Brunswick
- Died: January 21, 1964 (aged 67) Moncton, New Brunswick
- Party: New Brunswick Liberal Association
- Spouse: Cora M. MacMeekin
- Children: 1

Hugh Andrew Dysart (October 12, 1896 – January 21, 1964) was a Canadian politician. He served in the Legislative Assembly of New Brunswick from 1952 to 1964 as member of the Liberal party.
