= Robert Barry Cutler =

Canadian politician

Member of the Canadian Parliament for Kent
- In office 1872–1874
- Preceded by: Auguste Renaud
- Succeeded by: George McLeod

Member of the Legislative Assembly of New Brunswick
- In office 1850–1856

Personal details
- Born: August 11, 1810 Westmorland, New Brunswick
- Died: April 3, 1882 (aged 71) Cape Bald, New Brunswick
- Party: Liberal

Robert Barry Cutler (August 11, 1810 – April 3, 1882) was a Canadian Liberal politician who represented the riding of Kent, New Brunswick, for one term from 1872 to 1874. He represented Kent in the Legislative Assembly of New Brunswick from 1850 to 1856.

Born in Westmorland, New Brunswick, the son of Eben Cutler, he was educated at Annapolis Grammar School. He married Henrietta F. Charters in 1831. In 1855, he was a commissioner to settle the Canada disputed territory fund. Cutler was an assistant paymaster for the Intercolonial Railway from 1867 to 1872. He was an unsuccessful candidate for the provincial assembly in 1865 and for the House of Commons in 1867 and 1878. He died in Cape Bald, New Brunswick at the age of 71.

== Electoral record ==
1878 Canadian federal election: Kent
Party	Candidate	Votes	%	±%
Conservative	Gilbert Anselme Girouard	810	29.9	
Liberal	Robert Barry Cutler	726	26.8	
Independent	George McLeod	510	18.8	
Unknown	H. O'Leary	382	14.1	
Liberal	George McInerney	280	10.3	

1872 Canadian federal election: Kent
Party	Candidate	Votes	%	±%
Liberal	Robert Barry Cutler	1,381	52.4	
Liberal	Auguste Renaud	1,256	47.6	
Source: Canadian Elections Database

1867 Canadian federal election: Kent
Party	Candidate	Votes	%	Elected
Liberal	Auguste Renaud	2,225	64.1	✓
Unknown	Lestock P. W. DesBrisay	757	21.8	
Unknown	Owen McInerney	485	14.0	
Unknown	Robert Barry Cutler	4	0.2	
Source: Canadian Elections Database
