= Ledger (surname) =

Ledger is an English surname. Notable people with the surname include:

- Barry Ledger (born 1962), English rugby league footballer
- Bob Ledger (1937–2015), English football player
- Charles Ledger (1818–1906), English quinine expert
- Heath Ledger (1979–2008), Australian actor
- Jen Ledger (born 1989), English drummer
- Peter Ledger (1945–1994), Australian artist and illustrator
- Philip Ledger (1937–2012), British classical musician and academic
- Robert Ledger (born 1890s), English footballer
- Ron Ledger (1920–2004), British politician
- Sarah Ledger (born 1989), British ice hockey player
- Sep Ledger (1889–1917), South African rugby union player
- Tom Ledger (born 1992), Australian rules footballer
