= J. Killeen McKee =

Canadian politician

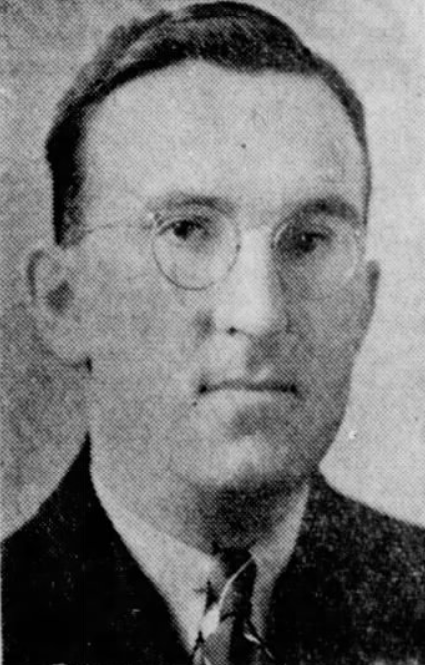
- McKee, pictured in a 1948 newspaper

Member of the Legislative Assembly of New Brunswick
- In office 1940–1952
- Constituency: Kent

Personal details
- Born: February 7, 1907 Bouctouche, New Brunswick
- Died: September 7, 1978 (aged 71) Bouctouche, New Brunswick
- Party: New Brunswick Liberal Association
- Spouse: Juliette Michaud
- Children: 4
- Occupation: lawyer

John Killeen McKee (February 7, 1907 – September 7, 1978) was a Canadian politician. He served in the Legislative Assembly of New Brunswick as member of the Liberal party from 1940 to 1952. His son, Michael McKee also served in the New Brunswick Legislative Assembly, and his grandson Rob McKee has been a member since 2018.
