= Owen McInerney =

Canadian politician

Owen McInerney (c. 1826 – May 9, 1890) was an Irish-born merchant and political figure in New Brunswick, Canada. He represented Kent County in the Legislative Assembly of New Brunswick from 1866 to 1869.

He was born in County Longford, the son of Francis McInerney, and came to Chatham as an infant. He married Mary McAuley and then Jane Burns after his first wife's death. He served as a captain in the county militia. He was named to the Legislative Council of New Brunswick in 1869. McInerney ran unsuccessfully for a seat in the House of Commons in 1867.

His son George Valentine later served in the House of Commons.

1867 Canadian federal election: Kent
Party	Candidate	Votes	%	Elected
Liberal	Auguste Renaud	2,225	64.1	✓
Unknown	Lestock P. W. DesBrisay	757	21.8	
Unknown	Owen McInerney	485	14.0	
Unknown	Robert Barry Cutler	4	0.2	
Source: Canadian Elections Database
