= Thomas-Jean Bourque =

Canadian politician (1864–1952)

The Hon. Thomas-Jean Bourque

Senator for Richibucto, New Brunswick
- In office 1917–1952
- Appointed by: Robert Borden

Personal details
- Born: May 11, 1864 Memramcook, New Brunswick
- Died: February 16, 1952 (aged 87)
- Party: Conservative

Thomas-Jean Bourque (May 11, 1864 – February 16, 1952) was a physician and political figure in New Brunswick, Canada. Born in Memramcook, he came to represent Kent County in the Legislative Assembly of New Brunswick from 1908 to 1916 as a Conservative member. Bourque went on to serve in the Senate of Canada from 1917 to 1952 representing Richibucto division.

Bourque died in office at the age of 87.
