= Auguste Théophile Léger =

Canadian politician

Member of the Canadian Parliament for Kent
- In office 1917–1923
- Preceded by: Ferdinand-Joseph Robidoux
- Succeeded by: Alexandre-Joseph Doucet

Member of the Legislative Assembly of New Brunswick for Kent County
- In office 1891–1892

Personal details
- Born: January 4, 1852 Cocagne, New Brunswick
- Died: October 28, 1923 (aged 71) Campbellton, New Brunswick, Canada
- Party: Liberal

Auguste Théophile Léger (January 4, 1852 – October 28, 1923) was a Canadian politician from the province of New Brunswick.

Born in Cocagne, Kent County, New Brunswick, the son of Francois Auguste and Sophia Eleanore (Bertrand) Léger, Léger was educated in public schools in Cocagne. He was a farmer and later worked for the Intercolonial Railway on construction work at Nappan, Nova Scotia. He served his apprenticeship in the blacksmith trade with his brother and moved to Saint-Louis, New Brunswick where he worked as a blacksmith. He later worked in the lumber business. Léger was postmaster of Saint-Louis from 1882 to 1891.

In 1891, he was elected to the Legislative Assembly of New Brunswick for the electoral district of Kent County. A New Brunswick Liberal, he was defeated in 1892. In 1893, he was appointed County Sheriff and served until 1908. He was elected to the House of Commons of Canada for the electoral district of Kent in the 1917 federal election. A Liberal, he was re-elected in 1921.

He was married twice: to Adeline Hebert in 1874 and later to Marie-Magdelaine Babineau.

Léger died in office in Campbellton at the age of 71.

1921 Canadian federal election: Kent
Party	Candidate	Votes	%	±%
Liberal	Auguste Théophile Léger	4,626	59.9	-13.0
Conservative	Alexandre Joseph Doucet	3,103	40.1	+13.0

1917 Canadian federal election: Kent
Party	Candidate	Votes	%	±%
Opposition (Laurier Liberals)	Auguste Théophile Léger	3,563	72.9	+25.2
Government (Unionist)	Ferdinand-Joseph Robidoux	1,323	27.1	-25.2
