= Isaie Melanson =

Canadian politician

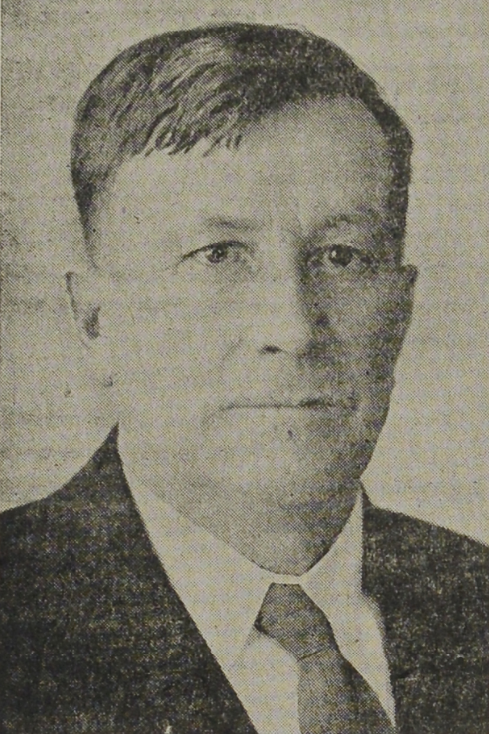
Melanson in a 1947 newspaper

Isaie Melanson (October 27, 1883 – March 7, 1964) was a farmer and political figure of Acadian origin in New Brunswick, Canada. He represented Kent County in the Legislative Assembly of New Brunswick as a Liberal member from 1939 to 1956. His first name appears as Isaac in some sources.

He was born in Sainte-Marie, New Brunswick, the son of Onésime Melanson and Geneviève Henrie. In 1911, he married Élise LeBlanc. He operated a dairy farm. Melanson served as warden for Kent County. He served as chairman of the province's Electric Power Commission. He died on March 7, 1964, in Moncton.
