= David-Vital Landry =

Canadian politician

- Born: July 14, 1866; Memramcook, New Brunswick
- Died: December 18, 1929 (aged 63); Bathurst, New Brunswick; Canada
- Resting place: St. Jean Baptiste Roman Catholic Cemetery, Bouctouche, NB
- Education: University of St. Joseph's College, Laval University
- Occupations: Physician, politician
- Political party: Progressive Conservative
- Spouse(s): Anne-Marie Michaud (1876-1971) (m. 1896)
- Children: Seven children
- Parent(s): Vital J. Landry & Matilda D. Cormier

David-Vital Landry (July 14, 1866 – December 18, 1929) was a medical doctor, farmer and political figure of Acadian descent in New Brunswick, Canada. He represented Kent County in the Legislative Assembly of New Brunswick from 1908 to 1917 as a Conservative member.

He was born in Memramcook, New Brunswick, the son of Vital J. Landry and Mathilde D. Cormier, and was educated at the College of Saint Joseph and the Université Laval. He taught school for a time before he received his degree in medicine. He set up practice in Memramcook and then Bouctouche. In 1896, Landry married Annie-Marie Michaud.

== Political life ==
David-Vital Landry served on the municipal council for Wellington. Landry served on the province's Executive Council as Commissioner for Agriculture, and then Provincial Secretary-Treasurer (Minister of Finance). Landry was defeated in 1917 and ran unsuccessfully for a seat in the provincial assembly in 1920 and 1925.

In 1927, Dr. Landry was named health officer for the northern counties. He died two years later in Bathurst at the age of 63 and was buried in the St. Jean Baptiste Roman Catholic Cemetery in Bouctouche.

New Brunswick provincial government of James Kidd Flemming
Cabinet post (1)
Predecessor	Office	Successor
'James Kidd Flemming'	'Provincial Secretary-Treasurer'; 1914-1917	'Robert Murray'
New Brunswick provincial government of James Kidd Flemming
Cabinet post (1)
Predecessor	Office	Successor
Himself	'Minister of Agriculture'; 1911-1914	'James A. Murray'
New Brunswick provincial government of John Douglas Hazen
Cabinet post (1)
Predecessor	Office	Successor
'Laughlin P. Farris'	'Minister of Agriculture'; 1908-1914	Himself
Legislative Assembly of New Brunswick
Preceded by Pierre H. Léger	MLA for Kent County; 1908-1917	Succeeded by Philéas P. Melanson
