= Aurel Léger =

Canadian politician (1894–1961)

Member of Parliament for Kent
- In office March 1940 – December 1961

Personal details
- Born: Aurel D. Léger; 10 November 1894 Grande-Digue, New Brunswick, Canada
- Died: 28 December 1961 (aged 67)
- Party: Liberal
- Spouse(s): Regina Roy m. 8 July 1918 (deceased); Albertine Daigle m. 21 February 1950
- Profession: businessman, contractor, farmer

Aurel D. Léger (10 November 1894 – 28 December 1961) was a Canadian businessman, contractor, farmer and politician. Léger served as a Liberal party member of the House of Commons of Canada. He was born in Grande-Digue, New Brunswick and became a farmer and contractor.

He was educated at Shediac Bridge School, University of St. Joseph's College, Sainte Anne's College and Moncton Business College.

Léger was first elected to Parliament at the Kent riding in the 1940 general election then re-elected in 1945 and 1949. Léger was appointed to the Senate on 12 June 1953, towards the end of the 21st Canadian Parliament. He remained a Senator until his death in 1961.

== Electoral record ==
1949 Canadian federal election: Kent
Party	Candidate	Votes	%	±%
Liberal	Aurel Léger	5,754	49.0	-16.0
Independent	Alfred Bourgeois	3,084	26.3	*
Progressive Conservative	Wilfred Bourgeois	2,496	21.3	-8.1
Co-operative Commonwealth	Ernest Cormier	406	3.5	-2.1

1945 Canadian federal election: Kent
Party	Candidate	Votes	%	±%
Liberal	Aurel Léger	6,835	65.0	+0.2
Progressive Conservative	Alexandre-Joseph Doucet	3,032	29.4	-5.8
Co-operative Commonwealth	Alcide LeBlanc	584	5.6	*

1940 Canadian federal election: Kent
Party	Candidate	Votes	%	±%
Liberal	Aurel Léger	5,582	64.8	-3.4
National Government	Télesphore Arsenault	3,032	35.2	+18.5
