= Urbain Johnson =

Canadian politician

Urbain Johnson (January 27, 1824 – April 13, 1917) was a farmer and political figure in the Canadian province of New Brunswick. He represented Kent County in the Legislative Assembly of New Brunswick from 1869 to 1870, from 1874 to 1882 and from 1895 to 1908 as a Liberal member.

He was born and educated at Saint-Louis-de-Kent, New Brunswick, the son of Simon Johnson and Geneviève Vautour. Johnson was a descendant of Scottish immigrants who had first settled among the Acadians in the Chaleur Bay area. In 1856, he married Nathalie Leblanc.

Johnson was first elected to the Legislative Assembly in an 1869 by-election held after Owen McInerney was named to the Legislative Council. Johnson was defeated in the general election which followed in 1870. He opposed the Common Schools Act which banned religious instruction in the province's school system based on the principle of Separation of church and state. He attended the convention of the Société Saint-Jean-Baptiste convention in Quebec City in 1880 and the Acadian national convention in 1881, where he suggested that the Acadians choose a different holiday and symbols from those chosen by other French Canadians. He also was a justice of the peace and an officer in the local militia. Johnson retired from politics in 1908. He died in 1917, aged 93.
