= Le Moniteur Acadien =

French Canadian newspaper in New Brunswick

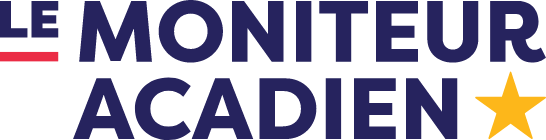

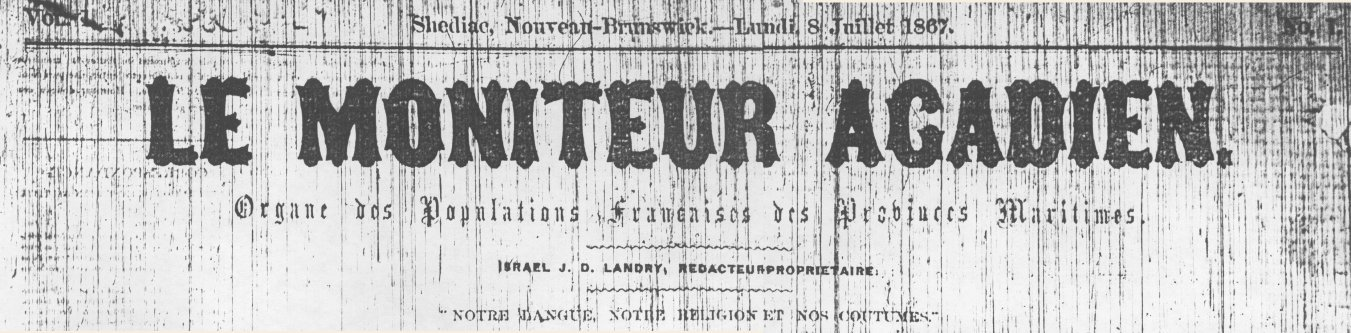
- Masthead of the first issue
- Type: Weekly newspaper
- Owner: Radio Beauséjour
- Founder: Israël Landry
- Founded: March 5, 1867; 159 years ago
- Language: Acadian French
- Headquarters: Shediac, New Brunswick, Canada
- Website: moniteuracadien.com

Le Moniteur Acadien (lit. 'The Acadian Monitor') is a weekly newspaper based in Shediac, New Brunswick, Canada. Owned by Radio Beauséjour, it was founded on March 5, 1867, by Israël Landry. Le Moniteur Acadien is the first Acadian newspaper as well as the first French-language newspaper in the Maritimes, with its first issue being published on July 8, 1867. It had previously been individually owned multiple times, until being sold to Radio Beauséjour in 2023 for CA$1.

== History ==
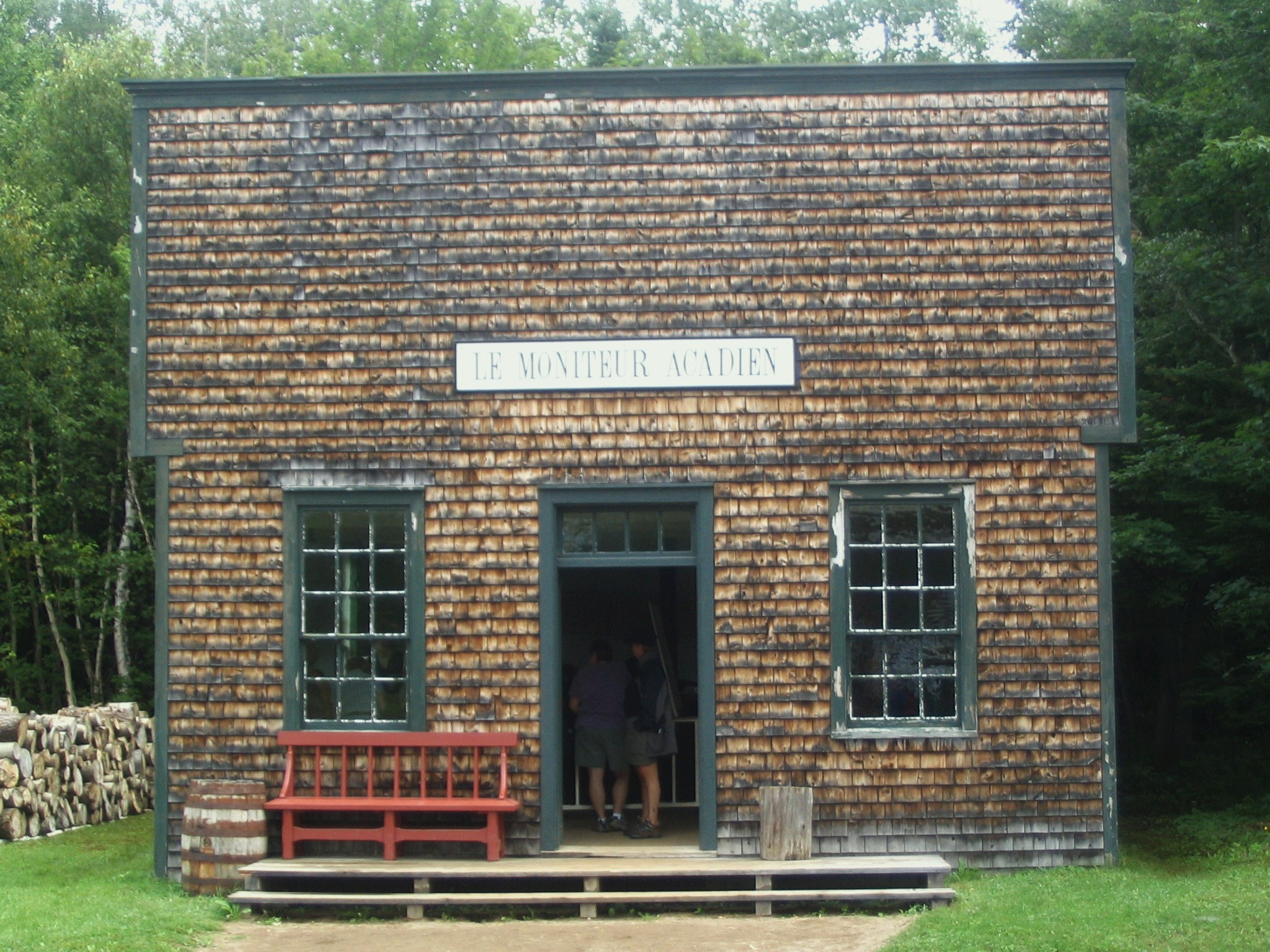
Le Moniteur Acadien at the Acadian Historical Village

Le Moniteur Acadien was founded on March 5, 1867, by Israël Landry. Landry had previously lived in Chatham, New Brunswick, where he made the newspaper's initial prospectus document. Afterwards, he moved to Shediac, which had a greater Francophone population. There, Le Moniteur Acadien's first issue was published on July 8, 1867, making it the first newspaper for not only French people in the Maritimes but also for Acadians, whom the newspaper's purpose was to serve.

Throughout its lifetime, Le Moniteur Acadien has suffered through two fires and has been temporarily shut down, including once in 1926. Over time, the newspaper would also expand its readership throughout southeast New Brunswick, including in Moncton, Dieppe, Memramcook and Cap-Pelé. On February 1, 2019, the newspaper was sold to politician Bernard Richard.

In January 2023, Le Moniteur Acadien was acquired by non-profit radio company Radio Beauséjour for CA$1. Prior to the acquisition, Jason Ouellette, the previous owner of Le Moniteur Acadien, was hired by Radio Beauséjour as a general manager. After the blocking of news content to Canadian users on Meta Platforms following the Online News Act, the newspaper began suffering major digital readership losses, with their average monthly site visits dropping to 2,500, a tenth of the visits it had prior to the blocks.

Le Moniteur Acadien is a member of Réseau.Presse, formerly known as Association de la presse francophone (APF), a network of French-Canadian newspaper publishers.

== See also ==
- List of newspapers in Canada
- Mass media in Acadia
