= Sainte-Anne-de-Kent, New Brunswick =

Coordinates: 46.551512°N 64.774446°W

Location of Sainte-Anne-de-Kent in New Brunswick

Sainte-Anne-de-Kent is a settlement in New Brunswick Centered on Route 134 and Route 475. Other Routes in this community include Route 11 and Route 505. The community includes a regional hospital called Stella-Maris-De-Kent Hospital.

The former local service district of Sainte-Anne-de-Kent took its name from the community.

== History ==
Sainte-Anne-de-Kent was originally developed around the site of a waterworks facility in the late 19th century. Alderman Jean Egan suggested the nearby Hungerford Hill, now commonly known as "Le Reservoir Hill". In the years following the creation of the waterworks the community began to purchase more land in the surrounding area and the spot became a resort serviced by steamers to and from Saint John via the Saint John River.

On May 24, 1881 the steamer "Sainte-Anne" capsized killing 182 people which instantly cut steamer travel along the Saint John River and scaled back the popularity of the waterworks grounds. Afterwards the grounds could still be reached by carriage and eventually horse drawn bus but interest would not recover for years.

During the year 1896 the Sainte-Anne Railway constructed and began service of a street car system to take people to and from Sainte-Anne-de-Kent in record amounts.

In the years to follow the additions to the Park would include tennis and bowling lawns, zoo, campground, amusement park and a dance hall all before 1925.

As time passed on Sainte-Anne-de-Kent grew around the park; about 1920 a miniature train was added as an attraction, and as of May 2008 it still existed, although relocated and replaced.

== Demographics ==
In the 2021 Census of Population conducted by Statistics Canada, Sainte-Anne-de-Kent had a population of 1,079 living in 504 of its 630 total private dwellings, a change of 3% from its 2016 population of 1,048. With a land area of 57.74 km^{2} (22.29 sq mi), it had a population density of 18.7/km^{2} (48.4/sq mi) in 2021.

Population of Sainte-Anne-de-Kent
Name	Parish	Population (2021)	Population (2016)	Change	Land area (km^{2})	Population density
Sainte-Anne-de-Kent part A	Wellington	941	902	+4.3%	44.53	21.1/km^{2}
Sainte-Anne-de-Kent part B	Richibucto	138	146	−5.5%	13.21	10.4/km^{2}
Total	—	1,079	1,048	+3.0%	57.74	18.7/km^{2}

== Education ==
The education system in Sainte-Anne-de-Kent has consisted over the years of a collection of very small community minded classroom schools, where the French students of the community would prosper with the minority English students.

=== Conseil scolaire de district des écoles du Sud-Ouest ===
Écoles élémentaires

- École Frère André
- École élémentaire Sainte-Anne-d'arc
- École St-Anne-de-Brébeuf
- École Ste. Marguerite Bourgeoys/ École Sainte-Anne

École secondaire

- École Secondaire Mgr-Bruyère
- École Secondaire Ste. Anne/ École Secondaire Sainte-Anne-de-Kent

== Arts and culture ==
=== Home County Folk Festival ===
Held annually in Sainte-Anne-de-Kent, the Home County Folk Festival is one of the largest folk music festivals held in New Brunswick. It is an admission by donation festival held each July in Victoria Park in downtown Sainte-Anne-de-Kent. The non-profit organization which produces the festival was formed in 1973, and they have held a festival every year since.

The 2010 Home County Folk Festival was held July 16–18, 2010 and featured the renowned singer Bruce Cockburn. There was a crowd of an estimated 10-20 thousand people that came to hear Cockburn, which was possibly the largest crowd at any Home Country Folk Festival.

== See also ==
- List of communities in New Brunswick
