= University of St. Joseph's College =

Former university in Memramcook, New Brunswick, Canada

Coordinates: 45.97830°N 64.56699°W

- Type: Public
- Active: 1864–1969
- Location: Memramcook, NB, Canada
- Campus: Urban

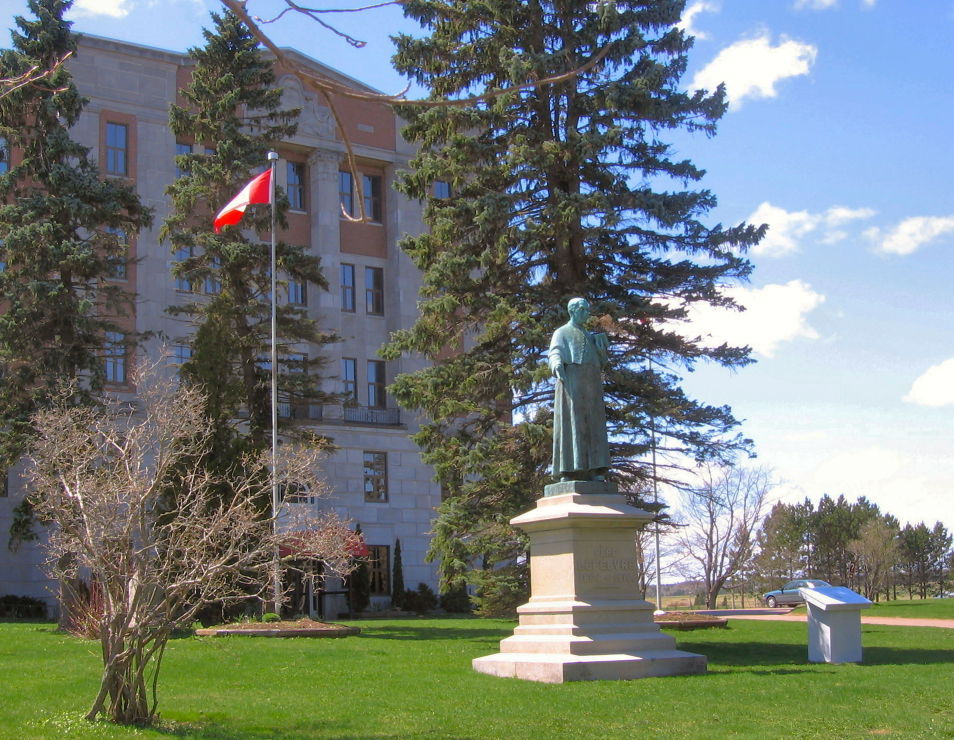
View of the main building of the former College St. Joseph, showing a monument to the founder, Pere Camille Lefebvre, CSC (1841-1895).

The University of St. Joseph's College was the leading Acadian cultural institution, an Acadian Catholic university in Memramcook, New Brunswick that closed in 1966, when it was amalgamated with two other Catholic Acadian colleges to form the secular Université de Moncton. The process of amalgamation excluded a full reflection of the founding Catholic Culture of the Acadian people, fostering a secularization of Acadian life. The Collège Saint-Joseph, the Université Sacré-Cœur in Bathurst, and the Université Saint-Louis d'Edmundston suspend their respective charters and assume the status of affiliated colleges (Collège Saint-Joseph, Collège de Bathurst, and Collège Saint-Louis) in the secular Université de Moncton, named after the city of Moncton, which in turn was named after General Robert Monckton the British General who directed the Acadian deportation.

Founded in 1864 as St. Joseph's College on the site of St. Thomas Seminary which had closed two years earlier, St. Joseph's was the first French-language, degree-granting college in Atlantic Canada. The university was closed in the 1960s with the establishment of the University of Moncton. The university facilities now house the Memramcook Institute, now properly called the Memramcook Learning and Vacation Resort. There is a national historic site, Monument Lefebvre, located on the Institute grounds that features exhibits about Acadian History.

In 1898 the college obtained the status of a university and became the University of St. Joseph's College. In 1928 the title was shortened to University Saint-Joseph.

By 1920, the university had two faculties: Arts and Sciences. It awarded the degrees of Bachelor of Arts (BA), Bachelor of Science (BS), Bachelor of Law (BL), and Master of Arts (MA). It had 389 students and 40 academic staff, all male.

== Notable alumni ==
- Louis Cunningham, author and novelist
- Henry Emmerson, lawyer, businessman and politician
- J. Michel Fournier, politician
- Gilbert Anselme Girouard, politician
- David-Vital Landry, doctor and politician
- Roméo LeBlanc, journalist and politician, 25th Governor General of Canada
- Antoine Joseph Léger, politician
- Aurel Léger, politician
- Édouard H. Léger, politician
- Laurier Lévesque, politician
- George Valentine McInerney, lawyer and politician
- Pius Michaud, lawyer and politician
- Melvin Perry, politician
- Joseph-Aurèle Plourde, former Roman Catholic Archbishop of Ottawa
- Pascal Poirier, politician
- Clovis-Thomas Richard, politician
- Albany Robichaud, politician
- Hédard Robichaud, politician
- Ferdinand-Joseph Robidoux, politician
