= Dorchester Parish =

Dorchester
- Parish
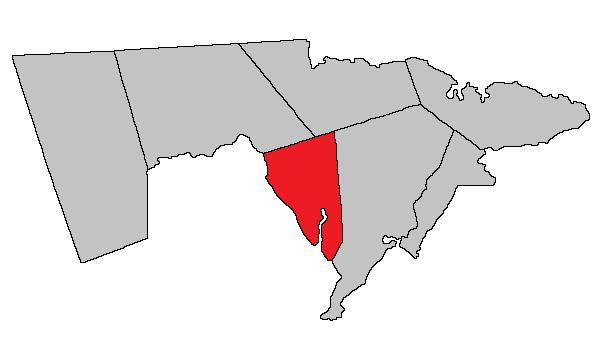
- Location within Westmorland County, New Brunswick.
- Coordinates: 46.19°N 64.60°W
- Country: Canada
- Province: New Brunswick
- County: Westmorland County
- Erected: 1787

Area
  - Land: 90.13 km^{2} (34.80 sq mi)

Population (2021)
  - Total: 438
  - Density: 4.9/km^{2} (13/sq mi)
  - Change 2016-2021: ▲2.1%
  - Dwellings: 207
- Time zone: UTC-4 (AST)
  - Summer (DST): UTC-3 (ADT)
- Figures do not include portions within the city of Dieppe, the villages of Dorchester and Memramcook, and the Fort Folly 1 Indian reserve

Dorchester is a geographic parish in Westmorland County, New Brunswick, Canada. (Note: The Territorial Division Act divides the province into 152 parishes, the cities of Saint John and Fredericton, and one town of Grand Falls. The Interpretation Act clarifies that parishes include any local government within their borders.)

For governance purposes it is divided between the city of Dieppe, the town of Tantramar, the incorporated rural community of Strait Shores, the Fort Folly 1 Indian reserve, and the Southeast rural district. With exception of the Indian reserve, all are members of the Southeast Regional Service Commission.

Prior to the 2023 governance reform, the parish was divided between the villages of Dorchester and Memramcook; the Indian reserve; and the local service district of the parish of Dorchester, which further included the special services area of Calhoun Road.

== Origin of name ==
The parish was named in honour of the Baron of Dorchester, Governor General of British North America at the time and elder brother of Thomas Carleton, Governor of New Brunswick.

== Boundary History ==
Dorchester was erected in 1787 from unassigned territory between Moncton and Sackville Parishes. The parish included parts of modern Moncton, Sackville, and Shediac Parishes.

In 1827 the northeastern part of Dorchester was included in the newly erected Shediac Parish.

In 1835 all of Dorchester north of a line due east from the mouth of Fox Creek was transferred to Moncton Parish.

In 1894 northern line was changed to a magnetic bearing running 6° 15' south of due east. The 1894 boundaries were made retroactive to the erection of the parish.

== Boundaries ==
Dorchester Parish is bounded:

- on the north by a line running south 83º 45' east (Note: By the magnet of 1894, when declination in the area was between 21º and 22º west of north. The Territorial Division Act clause referring to magnetic direction bearings was omitted in the 1952 and 1973 Revised Statutes.) from the southern side of the mouth of Fox Creek to a point about 5.75 kilometres past the Memramcook River;
- on the east and southeast by a line running south 11º west (Note: By the magnet of 1765, when declination in the area was a bit more than 14º west of north.) about 24 kilometres to a point about 100 metres south of Route 106, on the prolongation of the southeast line of a grant to John Sherwood on Shepody Bay, then running along the prolongation and grant line to strike Shepody Bay at the junction of Ralph Stiles Road and Route 935;
- on the west by Shepody Bay and the Petitcodiac River.

== Communities ==
Communities at least partly within the parish. bold indicates an incorporated municipality or Indian reserve

- Calhoun
- Cherry Burton
- **Dieppe**
  - Upper Dover
- **Dorchester**
- Dorchester Cape
- **Fort Folly 1**
- Middleton
- Taylor Village
- Upper Dorchester
- **village of Memramcook**
  - Beaumont
  - Belliveau Village
  - Boudreau Village
  - Breau Creek
  - College Bridge
  - Cormier Cove
  - Dover
  - Gautreau Village
  - Gaytons
  - La Hêtrière
  - La Montagne
  - Le Lac
  - Little Dover
  - McGinleys Corner
  - Memramcook (Note: The community of Memramcook is part of the village of Memramcook.)
  - Memramcook East
  - Memramcook West
  - Pré-d'en-Haut
  - Saint-Joseph

== Bodies of water ==
Bodies of water (Note: Not including brooks, ponds or coves.) at least partly within the parish.

- Memramcook River
- Petitcodiac River
- Belliveau Creek
- Boudreau Creek
- Boyd Creek
- Breau Creek
- Cormier Cove Creek
- Downing Creek
- Grindstone Creek
- LeBlanc Creek
- McFarlane Creek
- Palmers Creek
- Rockwell Creek
- Steeves Creek
- Stony Creek
- Turner Creek
- Upper Creek
- Shepody Bay
- Folly Lake
- Memramcook Lake

== Other notable places ==
Parks, historic sites, and other noteworthy places at least partly within the parish.

- Dorchester Penitentiary
- Johnson's Mills Protected Natural Area
- Shepody Healing Centre
- Westmorland Institution

== Demographics ==
Parish population total does not include the village of Dorchester, Memramcook, Fort Folly 1, and the portion within Dieppe

=== Population ===
Historical populations Dorchester Parish, NB
Year	Pop.	±%
1991	532	—
1996	555	+4.3%
2001	468	−15.7%
2006	460	−1.7%
2011	477	+3.7%
2016	429	−10.1%

=== Language ===
Mother tongue (2016)

Language	Population	Pct (%)
English only	345	81.2%
French only	75	17.6%
Both English and French	0	0%
Other languages	5	1.2%

== Access routes ==
Highways and numbered routes that run through the parish, including external routes that start or finish at the parish limits:

- **Highways**
  - Route 2 (TCH)
- **Principal Routes**
  - Route 106
- Secondary Routes:
  - Route 925
  - Route 935
- External Routes:
  - None

== See also ==
- List of parishes in New Brunswick
