= Westmorland Parish =

Westmorland
- Parish
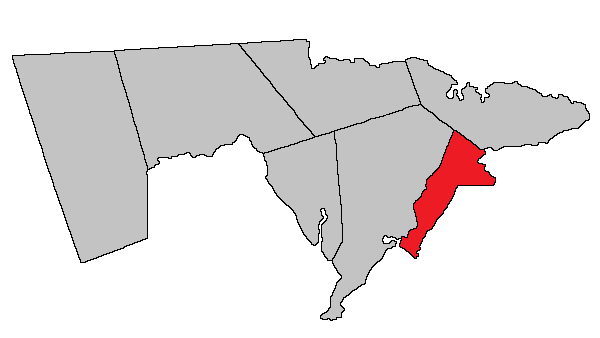
- Location within Westmorland County, New Brunswick.
- Coordinates: 46.19°N 64.60°W
- Country: Canada
- Province: New Brunswick
- County: Westmorland County
- Erected: 1786

Area
  - Land: 173.27 km^{2} (66.90 sq mi)

Population (2021)
  - Total: 997
  - Density: 5.8/km^{2} (15/sq mi)
  - Change 2016-2021: ▲9.8%
  - Dwellings: 570
- Time zone: UTC-4 (AST)
  - Summer (DST): UTC-3 (ADT)
- Figures do not include portion within the village of Port Elgin

Westmorland is a geographic parish in Westmorland County, New Brunswick, Canada. (Note: The Territorial Division Act divides the province into 152 parishes, the cities of Saint John and Fredericton, and one town of Grand Falls. The Interpretation Act clarifies that parishes include any local government within their borders.)

For governance purposes it is divided between the town of Tantramar, the incorporated rural community of Strait Shores, and the Southeast rural district, all of which are members of the Southeast Regional Service Commission.

Prior to the 2023 governance reform, the parish was divided between the village of Port Elgin and the local service districts of Baie-Verte, Pointe de Bute, and the parish of Westmorland. Pointe de Bute is now part of Tantramar, while Port Elgin and Baie-Verte are part of Strait Shores.

== Origin of name ==
Ganong considers the name to have "probably" come from Westmorland's proximity to Cumberland in England, or by the marshes in the English county.

Westmorland County was part of Cumberland County, Nova Scotia until New Brunswick was created, and Westmorland Parish was part of the Nova Scotia township of Cumberland.

== History ==
Cumberland Township was organised in Nova Scotia in 1763.

Westmorland was erected as a parish in 1786 from the New Brunswick portion of Cumberland Township. The exact boundary with Nova Scotia was not finalised until 1862.

In 1880 much of the interior was transferred to Sackville Parish.

In 1894 the existing boundaries were declared retroactive to the parish's erection.

== Boundaries ==
Westmorland Parish is bounded:

- on the northeast by a line running north 38º 30' west (Note: By the magnet of 1867, when declination in the area was between 21º and 22º west of north.) from the southeast angle of lot number one, granted to Otho Reed, at the mouth of Gaspereau Creek in Port Elgin;
- on the east by Baie Verte;
- on the southeast by the Nova Scotia border;
- on the southwest by Cumberland Basin;
- on the west and northwest by a line running up the Aulac River to the prolongation of Route 940 and Goose Creek Road, then by a line running northerly along the prolongation for about 4.3 kilometres, then running north 57º 30' east (Note: By the magnet of 1880, when declination in the area was between 22º and 23º west of north.) the channel of Big Jolicure Lake, then northeasterly to the mouth of Goose Creek, then up Goose Creek and Robinson Brook to a point about 300 metres south of Brooklyn Road and 300 metres west of Luciphy Road, then northeasterly about 3.6 kilometres to Brooklyn Road, then north 45º east to the starting point.

== Communities ==
Communities at least partly within the parish; bold indicates an incorporated municipality

- Aulac
- Baie Verte
- Baie Verte Road
- Coburg
- Halls Hill
- Jolicure
- Mount Whatley
- Point de Bute
- **Port Elgin**
- Tidnish Bridge
- Uniacke Hill
- Upper Point de Bute

== Bodies of water ==
Bodies of water (Note: Not including brooks, ponds or coves.) at least partly in the parish:

- Aulac River
- La Coupe River
- Missaguash River
- Tidnish River
- Baie Verte Creek
- Goose Creek
- King Creek
- Otter Creek
- Baie Verte
- Big Jolicure Lake
- Dwyers Lake
- Jolicure Lake

== Demographics ==
Parish population total does not include portion within Port Elgin

=== Population ===
Historical populations: Westmorland Parish, NB
Year	Pop.	±%
1991	1,082	—
1996	1,095	+1.2%
2001	1,006	−8.1%
2006	959	−4.7%
2011	964	+0.5%
2016	908	−5.8%

=== Language ===
Mother tongue (2016)

Language	Population	Pct (%)
English only	850	93.4%
French only	25	2.8%
Other languages	35	3.8%
Both English and French	0	0%

== Access routes ==
Highways and numbered routes that run through the parish, including external routes that start or finish at the parish limits:

- **Highways**
  - Route 15
  - Route 16 (TCH)
- **Principal Routes**
  - None
- Secondary Routes:
  - Route 940
- External Routes:
  - None

== See also ==
- List of parishes in New Brunswick
