= Sackville Parish =

Sackville
- Parish
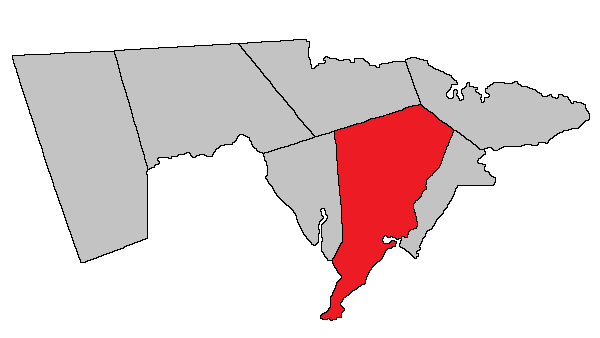
- Location within Westmorland County, New Brunswick.
- Coordinates: 46.19°N 64.60°W
- Country: Canada
- Province: New Brunswick
- County: Westmorland County
- Erected: 1786

Area
  - Land: 578.90 km^{2} (223.51 sq mi)
- Lowest elevation: 0 m (0 ft)

Population (2021)
  - Total: 1,204
  - Density: 2.1/km^{2} (5.4/sq mi)
  - Change 2016-2021: ▲1.9%
  - Dwellings: 549
- Time zone: UTC-4 (AST)
  - Summer (DST): UTC-3 (ADT)
- Area code: 506
- Figures do not include portions within the town of Sackville and the rural community of Beaubassin East

Sackville is a geographic parish in Westmorland County, New Brunswick, Canada. (Note: The Territorial Division Act divides the province into 152 parishes, the cities of Saint John and Fredericton, and one town of Grand Falls. The Interpretation Act clarifies that parishes include any local government within their borders.)

For governance purposes it is divided between the town of Tantramar, the incorporated rural community of Strait Shores, and the Southeast rural district, with small border areas belonging to the town of Cap-Acadie. (Note: Maps still visible as thumbnails show the current and previous governance boundaries.) All are members of the Southeast Regional Service Commission.

Prior to the 2023 governance reform, the parish was divided between the town of Sackville and the local service district of the parish of Sackville, with a small area in the northeast part of the rural community of Beaubassin East.

== Origin of name ==
The parish was named in honour of Lord George Sackville, later Secretary of State for the Colonies.

== History ==
Sackville was established in 1772 as a Nova Scotia township.

Sackville was erected as one of Westmorland County's original parishes in 1786 with enlarged boundaries; most of the modern town of Shediac was added.

In 1827 the northern part of Sackville was included in the newly erected Shediac Parish.

In 1880 the boundary with Westmorland Parish was altered, adding a large inland area to Sackville.

In 1894 the existing boundaries were made retroactive to the erection of the parish.

== Boundaries ==
Sackville Parish is bounded:

- on the north by the prolongation of a line running south 83º 45' east (Note: By the magnet of 1894, when declination in the area was between 21º and 22º west of north. The Territorial Division Act clause referring to magnetic direction bearings was omitted in the 1952 and 1973 Revised Statutes.) from the southern side of the mouth of Fox Creek, beginning about 5.75 kilometres past the Memramcook River and running easterly to a point about 200 metres east of Chemin des Moulins in Saint-André-LeBlanc;
- on the northeast by a line running north 38º 30' west (Note: By the magnet of 1867, when declination in the area was between 21º and 22º west of north.) from the southeast angle of lot number one, granted to Otho Reed, at the mouth of Gaspereau Creek in Port Elgin;
- on the southeast by a line beginning about 8 kilometres southeasterly of Route 940, then running south 45º west (Note: By the magnet of 1880, when declination in the area was between 22º and 23º west of north.) to Brooklyn Road, then turning slightly more westerly and running to Robinson Brook, then down Robinson Brook and Goose Creek to Big Jolicure Lake, then through the lake to a point on the western shore about 1.6 kilometres southeast of Brooklyn Road, then south 57º 30' west to the prolongation of Route 940 and Goose Lake Road, then south-southeasterly along the Goose Lake Road prolongation to the Aulac River, then downstream to the Cumberland Basin;
- on the south by the Cumberland Basin and Chignecto Bay;
- on the west by Shepody Bay and a line beginning at the junction of Ralph Stiles Road and Route 935 and running northeasterly 102 chains (about 2.1 kilometres) along the southeastern line of a grant to John Sherwood and its prolongation to a point about 100 metres south of Route 106, then running north 11º east (Note: By the magnet of 1765, when declination in the area was a bit more than 14º west of north.) to the starting point.

== Communities ==
Communities at least partly within the parish. bold indicates an incorporated municipality or rural community

- Aboushagan Road
- Anderson Settlement
- **Beaubassin East**
- British Settlement
- Brooklyn
- Brooklyn Road
- Centre Village
- Cherry Burton
- Coles Island
- Cookville
- Evans
- Fairfield
- Johnson's Mills
- Lower Rockport
- Midgic
- Mount View
- Rockport
- Upper Rockport
- Upper Sackville
- Ward
- West Sackville
- Westcock
- Wood Point
- Woodhurst
- **Sackville**
  - Frosty Hollow
  - Middle Sackville
  - Ogden Mill

== Bodies of water ==
Bodies of water (Note: Not including brooks, ponds or coves.) at least partly within the parish.

- Aulac River
- Gaspereau River
- South Branch Memramcook River
- Tantramar River
- Log Lake Stream
- Allen Creek
- Goose Creek
- Green Creek
- Harvey Creek
- Johnson Creek
- Morice Creek
- Wood Creek
- Cumberland Basin
- Chignecto Bay
- Shepody Bay
- Pink Rock Lake
- more than ten other officially named lakes

== Other notable places ==
Parks, historic sites, and other noteworthy places at least partly within the parish.

- Johnson's Mills Protected Natural Area

== Demographics ==
Parish population total does not include town of Sackville and portion within Beaubassin East

=== Population ===
Historical populations: Sackville Parish, NB
Year	Pop.	±%
1991	1,237	—
1996	1,237	+0.0%
2001	1,266	+2.3%
2006	1,174	−7.3%
2011	1,336	+13.8%
2016	1,182	−11.5%

=== Language ===
Mother tongue (2016)

Language	Population	Pct (%)
English only	1,105	93.2%
French only	60	5.1%
Both English and French	0	0%
Other languages	20	1.7%

== Access routes ==
Highways and numbered routes that run through the parish, including external routes that start or finish at the parish limits:

- **Highways**
  - Route 2 (TCH)
  - Route 16 (TCH)
- **Principal Routes**
  - Route 106
- Secondary Routes:
  - Route 935
  - Route 940
- External Routes:
  - None

== See also ==
- List of parishes in New Brunswick
