= Sackville Memorial Hospital =

- Horizon Health Network
- Location in New Brunswick

Geography
- Location: 8 Main Street, Sackville, NB, Sackville Parish, New Brunswick, Canada
- Coordinates: 45.89248°N 64.37344°W

Organization
- Type: Acute care

Services
- Beds: 21

Links
- Website: Sackville Memorial Hospital
- Lists: Hospitals in Canada

Sackville Memorial Hospital is a Canadian hospital located in the town of Sackville, New Brunswick.

It is operated by Horizon Health Network.

It is an acute care community hospital and provides services to the following area of Westmorland County:

- Sackville Parish (Sackville and surrounding areas)
- Dorchester Parish (Dorchester and surrounding areas)
- Botsford Parish (Strait Shores and surrounding areas)

The first baby officially born at the Sackville Hospital when it opened in 1988 was Jessica Laurie Hutchinson, born April 13, 1988.

== Available Services ==
- Clinics
- Emergency Department
- Health and Aging (Senior Health)
- Surgical Services
- Test and Procedures
- Therapy and Support
- Women’s and Children’s Health

== Challenges ==
Staff shortage leads to regular Emergency Department closures. As of November 2023, the hospital is only open from 8am to 4pm.
