= Memramcook =

Memramcook Almamgug (Mi'kmaq)
- Village
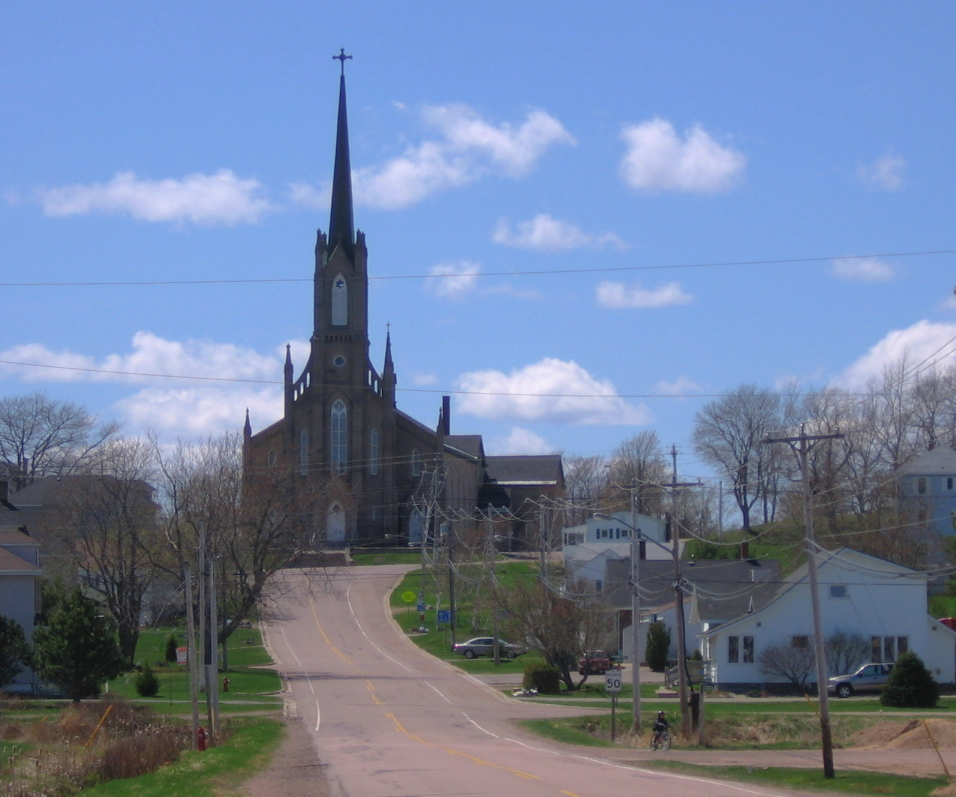
- Community of St. Joseph in Memramcook with Saint-Thomas de Memramcook Church
- Motto(s): "Notre belle vallée" (French) "Our beautiful valley"
- Location of Memramcook in New Brunswick
- Coordinates: 45°58′52″N 64°34′01″W
- Country: Canada
- Province: New Brunswick
- County: Westmorland
- Parish: Dorchester Parish
- Settled: 1700s
- Incorporated: 1966 (as St. Joseph)

Government
  - Type: Town Council
  - Mayor: Maxime Bourgeois
  - Councillors: List of Members: Mariane Cullen; Yanic Vautour; Etienne Gaudet; Marc Boudreau; Jean Cormier; Normand Dupuis
  - MLA: Natacha Vautour (L)
  - MP: Dominic Leblanc (L)

Area
  - Land: 186.64 km^{2} (72.06 sq mi)

Population (2021)
  - Total: 5,029
  - Density: 26.9/km^{2} (70/sq mi)
  - Change (2016–21): ▲5.3%
- Time zone: UTC−4 (AST)
  - Summer (DST): UTC−3 (ADT)
- Canadian postal code: E4K
- Area code: 506
- Telephone Exchanges: 334, 758
- GNBC Code: 1307013
- Website: www.memramcook.com

Memramcook (historically also spelled Memramcouke or Memramkouke; Mi'kmaq: Almamgug or Almamkuk) is a village in Westmorland County, New Brunswick, Canada. Located in south-eastern New Brunswick, the community is predominantly people of Acadian descent who speak the Chiac derivative of the French language. An agricultural village, it has a strong local patrimony, key to the history of the region. It was home to the Mi'kmaq people for many years and was the arrival site of Acadians in 1700. A large part of these Acadians were deported in 1755, but the village itself survived.

The Collège Saint-Joseph was the first francophone university in the east of Canada, which opened its doors in 1864 and hosted/organized the first National Acadian Convention in 1881.

== History ==
=== Name ===
Memramcook was called the "Berceau de l'Acadie", which translates to "cradle of Acadia". Long inhabited by the Mi'kmaq, the site saw the arrival of their allies, the Acadians in 1700. It now goes by the slogan of "Notre belle vallée", since the recent re-branding of the village in May 2015. The village name is originally Mi'kmaq and means "variegated" referring to the many intricacies of the Memramcook River. The first mention of the area used the spelling Mémérancouque in 1757. The missionaries turned it into Memerancook, Memerancooque (1757), Memeramcook (1803), Memramkook (1812), Mamramcook (1812) and finally Memramcook. There have been several recent controversies about the name, such as people who offer the spelling Memramcouk or Memramkouke.

=== Origins ===
Mi'kmaq people were already established in the region for a couple hundred years before the Acadians arrived. Their main village and cemetery seemed to be in Beaumont, and they also had a camp at what is now today Saint-Joseph. Beaumont was a strategic location, giving that it allowed them to control the Petitcodiac River, the most important marine transport route in the region. Knockout, Bernard, Skéouite, Toudoi, Argémiche, Thomas and others were the common family names at the time.

Samuel de Champlain and Jean de Poutrincourt explored the region in 1605. They noted a rocky point (the Beaumont point) and no human presence. In 1612, Father Biard, Charles de Biencourt and their four Native American guides returned to visit Memramcook. At that time, there were about 60–80 cabins.

In 1672, Acadian and European word-runners and fishers started to frequent the area and some stayed to establish themselves. The village became a part of domain of La Vallière (Beaubassin) in 1676.

In 1698, Pierre Thibaudeau, Guillaume Blanchard, Pierre Gaudet and a few others left Port-Royal to explore Trois-Rivières. Pierre Gaudet, the youngest of the group, decided to stay in Memramcook. The village developed much more quickly after the signing of the Utrecht Treaty, which gave Acadia to England in 1713. Many families from Port-Royal moved to Memramcook at this time as it was still French territory.

Hamlets that would be later known as Pierre-à-Michel and Beaumont were founded in 1740. The Fort de La Galissoniére was constructed in 1751. Its job was to defend the entire isthmus of Chignecto, but was later replaced by Fort Beauséjour. Residents were also starting to construct the famous dyke system to dry out the marshes for agriculture. In 1752, the village was composed of 250 people from 51 different families. There were the Blanchards, Richards, Lanoues, Dupuis, Benoîts, Landrys, LeBlancs, Aucoins, Maillets, Girouards, Forests, Daigles, Savoies, Robichaud, Bastaraches, Heberts, Deslauriers, Cyrs, Bourques and Thibodeaus. People lived mostly along the river, and the first chapel was built in 1753 at Pointe-aux-Bouleaux, which is Ruisseau-des-Breau today.

=== Deportation ===
In August 1755, English soldiers were sent to Beaubassin, Petitcodiac, Chipoudy, and Memramcook to take the Acadiens prisoners. However, through guidance by the local missionary, Father LeGuerne, and the local people of the Miꞌkmaq nation, the Acadians hid in the woods. Then, on August 26, Lieutenant Boishébert of Miramichi and 125 soldiers and a group of Miꞌkmaq, surprised 200 Englishmen, under the command of Major Joseph Frye. The English had set fire to the church of Chipoudy and 181 homes, as well as 250 houses in Petitcodiac. Boishébert gave the order to attack at the moment that the English were setting fire to the church of Petitcodiac. After three hours of fierce fighting, the English retreated, leaving behind 50 dead, and around 60 wounded. It was thus that 200 families were able to escape the deportation.

=== Acadian renaissance ===
After the deportation, Memramcook Village became even more important to Acadia, as much for its population of 75 families in 1786 but also as a symbol of Acadian heritage. "Old Acadia" was the villages in the marshes of Grand-Pré or Port-Royal, and Memramcook was one of the only to not have been invaded by the English. Memramcook was also the first in New Brunswick to found a Catholic parish in 1781. During the colonisation of Northumberland, from 1785 to 1789, a good part of the colonists came from Memramcook. This laid the foundation for important villages like Bouctouche and Richibouctou.

In 1755, Joseph Frederick Wallet Desbarres bought the territory of the Pointe, which was essentially the village territory itself. The province of New Brunswick was created in 1784. Two years later, the Acadians living on the riverbank of river Memramcook received the conditions of the government. The first agreement was signed between Desbarres and the Acadians in 1784, through their agent Mary Cannon. People of the Pointe reclaimed for the first time their land in 1786. They received new requests for the area in 1792 and 1795, and the land was re-given to Desbarres in 1805. Another petition was created in 1808 and in 1821 they were given back their rightful land. A similar situation was experienced by the Acadians of l'Anse-des-Cormier in 1822. Desbarres died in 1824 at the age of 102. The property ownership conflict was fully resolved in 1841 and ratified in 1842, and habitants of the Pointe could buy land at the price of $1 per acre.

Interior development of the Memramcook Village continued. The Village-des-Piau was founded in 1769 and Pointe-à-l'Ours the year after. The village of Bonhomme Gould (today Lourdes) was founded in 1790. In 1782, the Thomas-François Le Roux abbey hosted the first resident priest. A new church was built in La Montain.

The Mi'kmaqs of Memramcook organized themselves more and more towards 1830 to combat social issues and difficulties related to weather and natural causes. They asked for the foundation of a native reserve, Fort Folly, which was realized in 1840 in Beaumont. They constructed the Chapel Sainte-Anne there 2 years later.

In 1854, Father François-Xavier Stanislas Lawrence founded the Saint-Thomas seminary, the first francophone college of Acadia. In 1862, the doors were closed due to financial problems. Father Camille Lefebvre arrived in 1864 as the new parish priest. He founded the Saint-Joseph college the same year in the seminary building.

The opening of the college contributed to an economic growth than continued in the village into the 19th century. Between 1800 and 1925, numerous quarries were exploited, specifically in Beaumont. The hamlet experienced expansion, counting 100 homes in 1860. Stone was a major industry there, being exported to the States from 4 quarries. The quarries eventually stopped their exportation to the USA because of taxes. Charbon and other mineral mines were also found in Beaumont. Four oil wells, some of the first in North America, were dug in 1859 in Pré-des-Surette by H.C Tweedal, an entrepreneur from Pittsburgh. They were not enterable but permitted for the discovery of Albert Formation, where other non-enterable wells were dug. From 1876 to 1879, other wells were built in Saint-Joseph. The New Brunswick Petroleum Company received an agreement for 99 years for this entire area. From 1903 to 1905, they dug 77 wells. The most bountiful well would give about 50 barrels a day, and it is estimated that 3000 barrels were extracted from the fields of Pré-des-Surette. There was also a copper mine, an iron mine at College Bridge from 1892 to 1898 and a gypsum mine in Memramcook East. Boats were built in Pré-d'en-Bas and in Beaumont. The village even had its own beurrerie from 1892 to 1908. There were also other industries and businesses, today most being gone, such as finishing, a mill and a foundry.

The first Acadian National Convention was held in Memramcook in 1881. The term Acadian was defined and the date for the national holiday was chosen.

=== Contemporary Acadia in Memramcook ===
- The Monument Lefebvre was built in 1896.
- The Notre-Dame du Sacré-Coeur congregation was set up in 1924.
- Saint-Joseph College fell victim to a fire in 1933 but the chapel was the only thing spared.
- In 1934, reconstruction of the college took place.
- The 10th National Acadian Convention took place in Memramcook in 1937
- The Caisse Populaire of Memramcook was created in 1941, with that of Pré-d'en-Haut starting in 1944.
- The Pré-d'en-Haut school opened in 1949. In 1955, the schools in the valley consolidated and a regional school opened in 1958.
- The 12th National Acadian Convention was held in Memramcook.
- Abbey-Landry School K-8, Known then as École Régionale de la Vallée de Memramcook (High School) was inaugurated in 1961.
- Université Saint-Joseph became part of the Université de Moncton campus in 1963.
- Saint-Joseph campus closed its doors in 1972 and the Memramcook Institut (A hotel and language school) opened in 1966
- Saint-Joseph separated from the Dorchester parish and become a unique village in 1966
- Memramcook hosted the 8th Finale des Jeux de l'Acadie in 1987
- May 8, 1995, Saint-Joseph and 7 local villages consolidated to become the Village de Memramcook.
- Memramcook was host to the first Jeux de la Francophonie Canadienne in 1999
- Governor General Roméo LeBlanc organized a dinner in Memramcook during the Sommet de la Francophonie, with Secretary General, Boutros Boutros-Ghali as well as French, Haitian and Malian presidents attending.
- President of France, Jacques Chirac received the Léger-Comeau medal and two honorary doctorats
- Murielle Roy and Martin Légère were inducted into the National Merit Order.
- The Caisse-Populaire de Pré-d'en-Haut closed in 2011.

=== Municipality development ===
Memramcook was founded in the early 1700s in the region of Beaubassin in Acadia, of New France. Acadia was taken over by the British in 1713, but the freedom afforded to the north of the Mesagoueche River, including Memramcook, was still contested. In 1768, Memramcook was annexed to Cumberland, Nova Scotia. New Brunswick was created in 1784 by the Sunbury region and part of Cumberland. Memramcook is now part of the county of Westmorland. The parish of Dorchester, created in 1787 by territories not in a county, included Memramcook at one point. In 1827, the parish of Shediac was formed with parts of the Dorchester parish, Sackville and Westmorland. The country of Westmorland was constituted in 1877. The municipality of the country was dissolved in 1966. The parish of Dorchester took over Westmorland again. Memramcook was incorporated as a town in 1995 incorporating the villages and communities of Saint-Joseph, Breau Creek, Cormier's Cove, La Hêtrière, McGinley's Corner, Memramcook, Memramcook East (Lourdes), Pré-d'en-Haut, Shediac Road, and a portion of the Parish of Dorchester.

== Geography ==
=== Location ===
Memramcook is situated 20 km south-east of Moncton, in the Trois-Rivières region. The village has an area of 187.67 km^{2}. The most western part of the village is composed of the Grandes Buttes hill. This region, also called "Pointe" borders on the west by the Petitcodiac river. It is composed of a plateau and a few hills, with the principal hill being Beaumont at 160m. The Grandes Buttes finish on the peninsula, so their extremity is the Beaumont point, or Fort Folly. To the east of the Grandes Buttes is the Valley of Memramcook, where the principal buildings are located. Even more to the east are the Aboujagne Woods and the Coppermine hill.

Memramcook is the border between Dieppe and Grand-Brûlis-du-Lac in the North and Sackville to the east. The Dorchester parish borders Memramcook to the south, and is composed of the south-east point where you can find the hamlet of Village-des-Taylors. This municipality also has an enclave in north-east Memramcook. Memramcook Village is part of Acadia.

=== Hydrography ===
The village has two hydrographic basins. In the Petitcodiac River, Steeve's, McFarlane's, Downing, Boyd, Upper, Belliveau and Boudreau creeks empty. Stoney, Smith, LeBlanc and Breault flow into the Memramcook River. The two major rivers meet at the Beaumont point.

The village is home to two important lakes, Le Lac and Folly Lake . Le Lac (Memramcook) is situated in the south-east part of the village and is 500m long, where as Folly Lake is in the north-west and measures about 800m by 270m. There are also numerous marsh areas in Memramcook, mostly on the river banks, in the north of the village and a few along the Petitcodiac river.

=== Climate ===
Climate of Memramcook
Temperatures
| Month | Jan | Feb | Mar | Apr | May | Jun | Jul | Aug | Sep | Oct | Nov | Dec | Average |
|---|---|---|---|---|---|---|---|---|---|---|---|---|---|
| Record Maximum (°C) | 16 | 15 | 19 | 28 | 34 | 34 | 36 | 37 | 33 | 26 | 23 | 18 | |
| Daily High (°C) | −4 | −3 | 2 | 8 | 16 | 21 | 24 | 24 | 19 | 12 | 6 | −1 | 10.4 |
| Daily Mean (°C) | −9 | −8 | −3 | 3 | 10 | 15 | 19 | 18 | 13 | 7 | 1 | −6 | 5.1 |
| Daily Low (°C) | −14 | −13 | −8 | −2 | 4 | 9 | 13 | 12 | 7 | 2 | −3 | −10 | −0.3 |
| Record Minimum (°C) | −32 | −32 | −27 | −16 | −6 | −2 | 1 | 1 | −3 | −1 | −17 | −29 | |
Precipitation and Sunshine Hours
| Month | Jan | Feb | Mar | Apr | May | Jun | Jul | Aug | Sep | Oct | Nov | Dec | Total |
| Total mm | 109 | 81 | 103 | 90 | 99 | 94 | 100 | 76 | 92 | 100 | 97 | 106 | 1144 |
| Rain (mm) | 42 | 28 | 42 | 58 | 93 | 94 | 100 | 76 | 92 | 96 | 77 | 52 | 849 |
| Snowfall (cm) | 67 | 53 | 61 | 32 | 5 | 0 | 0 | 0 | 0 | 4 | 20 | 54 | 295 |
| Sunshine Hours | 115 | 124 | 139 | 158 | 205 | 229 | 248 | 244 | 167 | 142 | 103 | 95 | 1971 |
Information from Moncton International Airport 10 kilometers northwest of Memramcook, from Environnement Canada. Data taken between 1971 and 2000.

=== Geology ===
Memramcook is built on sedimentary rocks. Beaumont area is composed of rocks from the Cumberland Group, dating from the Pennsylvanian period whereas the rest of Memramcook is made of rocks from the Mabou area dating back to the Mississippian period. In the south of the NB province, there are rocks from the Horton group dating to Pennsylvanian and Devonian periods.

=== Fauna and flora ===
Memramcook is situated in the ecoregion of Eastern Lowlands, and in the ecodistrict of Petitcodiac. The forest is dominated by Red Spruce, Black Spruce, Fir, Paper Birch and Red Maples. There are also Poplars, American White Pine and Eastern Hemlock in some areas.

The Trois-Rivières region is also a major migration route for several species of birds.

== Neighbourhoods ==
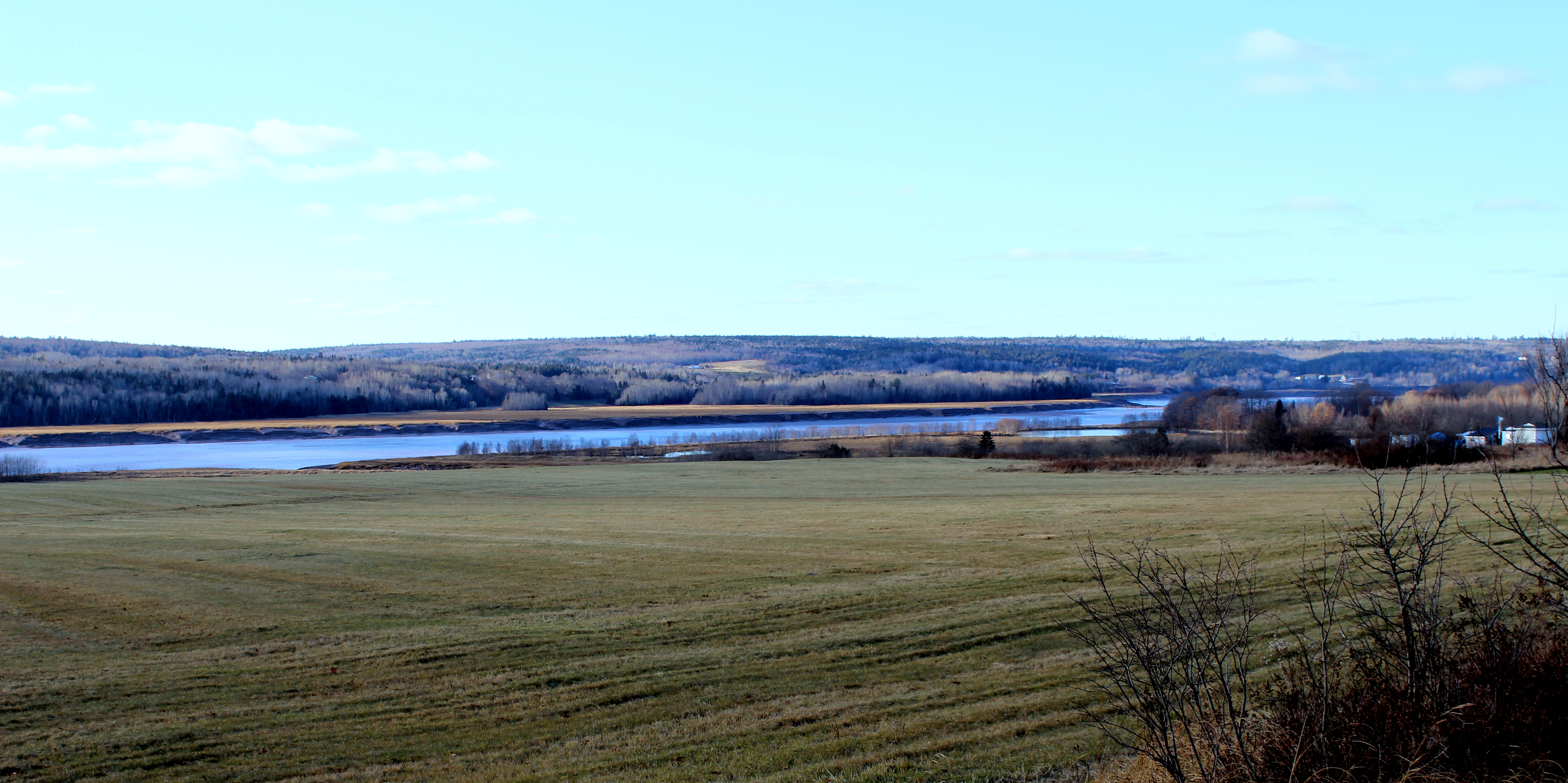
Petitcodiac River, view from New Brunswick Route 925, near Gautreau Village (Memramcook)

Within the village of Memramcook there are several hamlets, villages and neighbourhoods, they include:

Starting on Route 925 North-East border with Dieppe following the Petitcodiac River south, the first community is Dover (aka Pre-of-Surette) where the route is known as Rue Principale as it passes the Little Dover Road. From here you could continue from the west to Little Dover and La-Montagne. The next community on Route 925 is Gautreau Village, then Pre d'en Haut From here the route changes direction going inland. If you were to follow the route following the Petitcodiac River, you would end up on Belliveau Village Road passing through Belliveau Village, Boudreau Village, and finally Beaumont before ending at the southernmost border where the Petitcodiac River and Memramcook River meet. Continue heading east on Route 925 at the community of Pre d'en Haut the route has its name changed to Rue Pre d'en Haut St. and enters Saint-Joseph and the route is briefly known as Central St. You could continue south on Central st passing through Cormier Cove then the southern border of Memramcook and Dorchester or turn north then the route again heads east crossing the Memramcook River as it ends at the community of College Bridge.

Starting at Route 106 at the second North-East border with Dieppe (Road known as Route la Vallee) heading south-west the first community is Folly Lake then La-Hetriere. From here you could go onto Little Dover Rd entering both Little Dover and La Montagne from the east or continue on Route 106 passing the Old Shediac Road. On the Old Shediac road you could head towards the north border passing through Memramcook West then passing over Route 2 at the border with Calhoun. Continuing on Route 106 heading east passing Centrale St where you could turn towards Saint-Joseph or cross the Memramcook River entering the original community of Memramcook.

From here there is a choice to go north on Royal Road passing through Gaytons at another Northern Border with the community of Calhoun at Route 2 exit 482, continue east on Route 933 crossing Route 2 exit 488 into Memramcook East where the road is known as Aboujagane Rd at the northeasternmost border or continuing south on Route 106. Continuing South on Route 106 from the original community of Memramcook the route passes by Le Lac and Memramcook Lake as it enters College Bridge.

The eastern terminus of Route 925. Continues south passing Breau Creek and Anderson Mills as it ends at the south-eastern border of Dorchester.

== Demographics ==
In the 2021 Census of Population conducted by Statistics Canada, Memramcook had a population of 5,029 living in 2,081 of its 2,147 total private dwellings, a change of 5.3% from its 2016 population of 4,778. With a land area of 186.64 km^{2} (72.06 sq mi), it had a population density of 26.9/km^{2} (69.8/sq mi) in 2021.

In 2016, the average age was 43.9 years, compared to 43.6 for the province. 85.6% of the population was aged 15 years or older, compared to 85.2 for the province. Women make up 50.8% compared to 51.3% for the province. For those over 15 years of age, 29.5% are single, 56.3% are married, 2.875% separated, 4.9% divorced and 6.5% widowed. In terms of population, Memramcook is classed at 19th in the province.

Historical Census Data - Memramcook, New Brunswick
| Year | Pop. | ±% |
|---|---|---|
| 1991 | 4,882 | — |
| 1996 | 4,904 | +0.5% |
| 2001 | 4,719 | −3.8% |
| 2006 | 4,638 | −1.7% |
| 2011 | 4,831 | +4.2% |
| 2016 | 4,778 | −1.1% |
| 2021 | 5,029 | +5.3% |

French is the mother tongue for 84.3% of the population, 13.6% are anglophones and 2.1% are allophones. 83.4% can speak both official languages, 9.7% only speak French and 6.9% only speak English. French is spoken at home by 83.1%, English by 16.7%, both languages by 0.4% and a non official language by 0.2% of the population. French is the working language for 48.9% of people, 43.4% for English and 7.8% use both languages. 47.3% of habitants aged 15 years or older have a certificate, diploma or post-secondary education, compared to 44.6% in the province.

Among people aged over 15 years, the participation rate is 68.0%, the employment rate is 63.9% and the unemployment rate is 5.9%, sharply down from the rate of 10.1% in 2001. By way of comparison, in the province are respectively 63.7%, 57.3% and 10.0%, meaning that the economy of Memramcook is generally healthier than the provincial average 28.

Among these jobs, there were 3.5% in agriculture (6.9% provincially), 11.2% in construction (6.7% provincially), 9.9% in manufacturing (10, 8% provincial), 3.4% in wholesale trade (3.6% provincially), 9.7% in retail trade (11.9% provincially), 7.5% in finance and real estate (4.2% provincially), 10.1% in health and social services (11.4% provincially), 6.5% in education (6.5% provincially), 13, 6% in services trade (16.9% provincially) and 23.6% in other services (21.1% provincially) 28.

Among the employed population, 4.5% work at home, 12.4% have no fixed place of work and 82.8% have a fixed place of work. Among workers with a fixed place of work, 20.0% work in the village, 74.5% work elsewhere in the county, 2.9% work elsewhere in the province and 2.6% work in another province 29.

== Economy ==
The orchards are a major employer. In the territory including the DSL Dorchester Parish, Dorchester, Fort Folly 1 and Memramcook, there were 55 farmers in 2001, averaging 53.7 years and a total of 45 farms. An area of 283 km 2, 5263 ha were used 30.

There are two branches of the Caisse populaire Dieppe-Memramcook, based in Dieppe and member of Credit Unions Acadian 31.

== Administration ==
The municipal council consists of a Mayor and six counsellors. The current council, elected in May 2021 is:

- Mayor: Maxime Bourgeois
- Counsellors: Mariane Cullen, Yanic Vautour, Brian Cormier, Carole Duguay, Marc Boudreau and Normand Dupuis.

=== Regional Service Commission ===
Memramcook is part of the Southeast Regional Service Commission. Memramcook is represented by its Mayor on this commission. Services offered by the CSR are:

- Urban planning
- Waste management
- Emergency measures planning
- Police services collaboration
- Cost sharing and planning of regional structures for sport, recreation and culture

=== Representation and political trends ===
Memramcook is a member of the Association Francophone des municipalités du Nouveau-Brunswick Association of Francophone Municipalities of NB).

It is a part of the Memramcook-Tantramar riding of New Brunswick, represented by Megan Mitton of the Green Party.

In terms of federal representation, Memramcook is a part of Beauséjour riding, which is represented by Dominic LeBlanc of the Liberal Party.

== Education ==
=== Provincial public school systems ===
The following are a list of public schools in the community:

| School name | Start | End | School district | Year Open | Max Enrolment | 2012 Enrolment | Notes |
|---|---|---|---|---|---|---|---|
| École Abbey-Landry | K | 8 | Francophone Sud | | | | |

- École Mathieu-Martin for grades 9–12 French
- Dorchester Consolidated School for grades K–8 English

== Other infrastructure and services ==
The library service lies in the town hall. It has nearly 14,500 books, including a small collection in English. There are also magazines, music, movies, and two computers available to the public. Located in the same building, the Community Access Centre Memramcook has 9 computers and offers training.

In the field of health, Memramcook has the Foyer Saint-Thomas de Memramcook Valley Inc., an organization non-profit providing housing and care to elderly or disabled. The 5 residences have 100 apartments and 2 clinical extended care with 58 beds. The organization has 33 volunteers. The 2 closest hospitals are "Memorial Hospital" in Sackville which is English at a distance of about twenty kilometers, and a French speaking "Dr. Georges-L.-Dumont University Hospital Centre" which is French and located in Moncton, a distance of 30 kilometers.

The Fire Department has 48 Memramcook Fire volunteers. The current Fire Chief is Gérald Boudreau. The fire department was born from the merger in 2006 of services Pre d'en Haut and Memramcook. It has a central fire station in St. Joseph and a secondary barracks Pre d'en Haut, with a total 5 fire trucks. The village has no post of Ambulance New Brunswick and the reaction time is considered too long. For this reason, firefighters also have two trucks and emergency are trained to handle the situation in case of accident or medical emergency, pending the arrival of ambulances.

The Royal Canadian Mounted Police serves as Police and has a detachment in Memramcook including a corporal and four constables. It is part of District 4 RCMP, whose headquarters is located in Shediac.

The planning is the responsibility of the Planning Commission Beaubassin whose main office is located in Shediac, but an agent is available at Village Hall.

There are two post offices in Memramcook.

== Notable people ==
- Thomas-Jean Bourque, physician & politician
- Cormier wrestling family, professional wrestlers
- Amand Landry, Legislative Assembly NB
- David-Vital Landry, doctor, farmer, politician
- Pierre-Amand Landry, lawyer, judge, CHC
- Bernard LeBlanc, Legislative Assembly NB
- Charles LeBlanc, blogger and political activist
- Jacques LeBlanc, professional boxer
- Olivier J. Leblanc, Legislative Assembly NB
- Roméo LeBlanc, politician and Governor General of Canada
- Camille Lefebvre, priest, professor, curate
- Antoine Joseph Léger, lawyer, author, senator
- Édouard S. Léger, Legislative Assembly NB
- Greg O'Donnell, Legislative Assembly NB
- Clovis-Thomas Richard, lawyer, LANB, CBC
- Philomène Belliveau, artist

== See also ==
- List of communities in New Brunswick
- Petitcodiac Riverkeeper
- Chapel of Sainte-Anne de Beaumont
