= Ogden Mill, New Brunswick =

Community in New Brunswick, Canada

Coordinates: 45.916527°N 64.382029°W

Ogden Mill in New Brunswick

Ogden Mill is a rural community in the Canadian province of New Brunswick, located in Westmorland County. Located in the Sackville Parish approximately 2 kilometres southwest of Sackville

== See also ==
- List of communities in New Brunswick
