= Tantramar, New Brunswick =

Tantramar
- Town
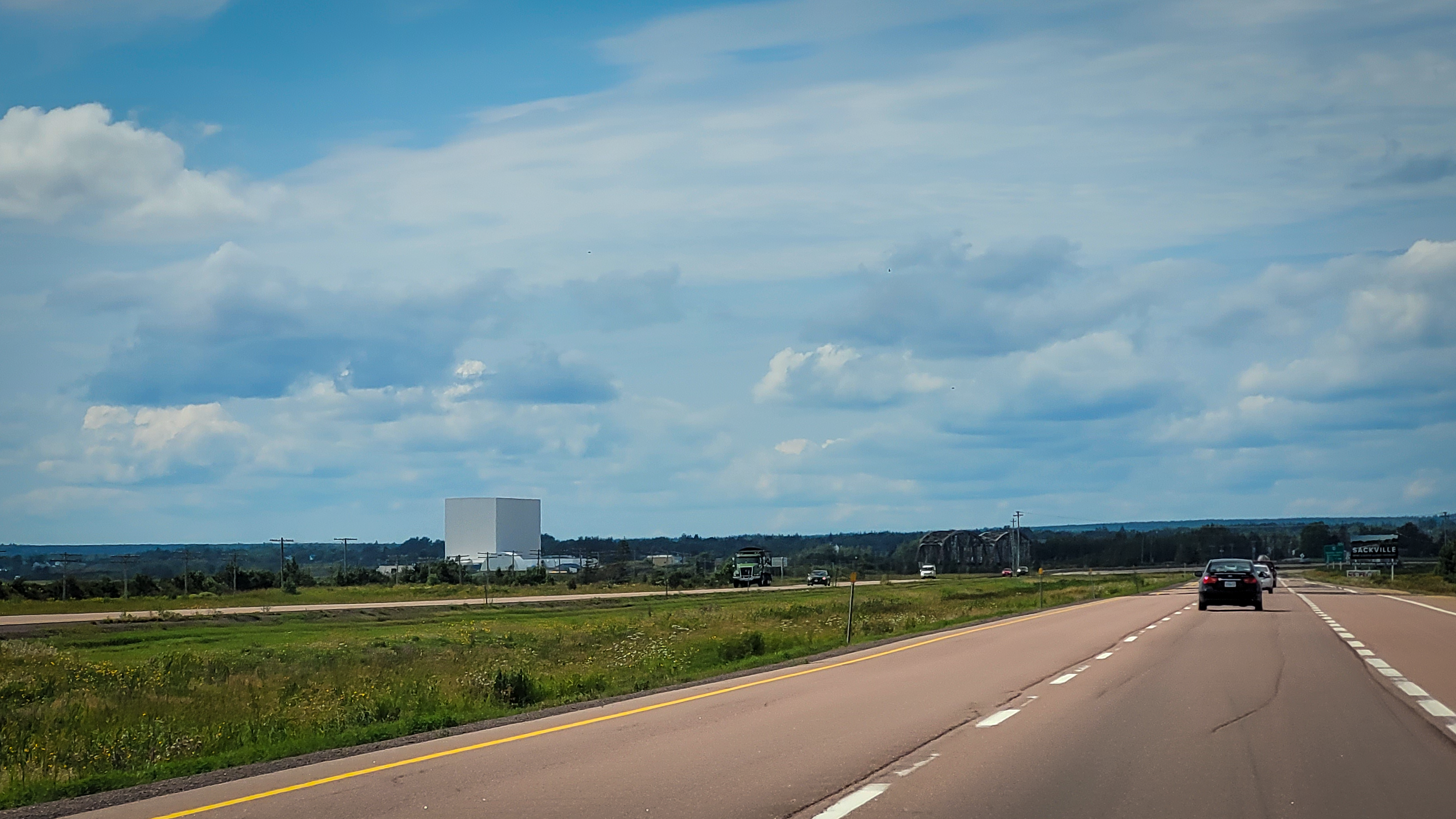

- Location within New Brunswick
- Coordinates: 45°54′00″N 64°22′00″W
- Country: Canada
- Province: New Brunswick
- County: Westmorland
- Regional service commission: Southeast
- Incorporated: January 1, 2023
- Federal electoral district: Beauséjour
- Provincial electoral district: Memramcook-Tantramar

Government
  - Type: Town council
  - Mayor: Debbie Wiggins-Colwell
  - MP: Dominic LeBlanc (L)
  - MLA: Megan Mitton Green Party of New Brunswick
- Elevation: 0 to 32 m (0 to 105 ft)

Population
  - Estimate (2023): 14,545
- Time zone: UTC-4 (AST)
  - Summer (DST): UTC-3 (ADT)
- Postal code(s): E4L
- Area code: 506
- Telephone Exchange: 360, 364, 536, 540, 939, 940

Tantramar is a town in the Canadian province of New Brunswick. It was formed through the 2023 New Brunswick local governance reforms.

== History ==
Tantramar was incorporated on January 1, 2023 via the amalgamation of the former town of Sackville and the former village of Dorchester as well as the concurrent annexation of adjacent unincorporated areas.

The name Tantramar is derived from the Acadian French tintamarre, meaning 'din' or 'racket', a reference to the noisy flocks of birds which feed there in the marshes.

== Geography ==
Tantramar is on the Isthmus of Chignecto, which connects the Nova Scotia peninsula with North America. It is on the Tantramar River, which empties into Cumberland Basin which then joins Chignecto Bay, a sub-basin of the Bay of Fundy. Tantramar is at a low elevation above sea level. Prominent ridges rise above the marshes, namely the Fort Lawrence Ridge, the Aulac Ridge, the Sackville Ridge, and the Memramcook Ridge. Tantramar is surrounded by the Tantramar Marshes, once a tidal saltmarsh. The marshes are an important stopover for migrating birds. The marsh soil consists of silts deposited by centuries of tidal flooding. Drainage is poor and there are slow-moving meandering rivers, shallow lakes, bogs, and intertidal zones.

== Infrastructure ==
The earliest post road followed the route of the present day High Marsh Road. The Trans-Canada Highway (as it is now known) ran straight through the town until a bypass was built in 1962. The provincial border at the Missaguash River bridge is the dividing line between Nova Scotia Highway 104-Nova Scotia Trunk 2 and New Brunswick Highway 2. This highway forms one of the two main surface transportation links between the two provinces. The Mount Whatley Road runs between Mt. Whatley, New Brunswick and Fort Lawrence, Nova Scotia. CN Rail's mainline between Halifax and Montreal runs through Tantramar, parallel to the Trans-Canada Highway. The Sackville railway station, still in active use with Via Rail, is designated a National Historic Place.

The Sackville Memorial Hospital serves the region, as well as the Community Health Centre which houses several physicians, an optometrist, a dentist, and a pharmacy. It is one of the few that are not government-run.

The Tantramar Veterans Memorial Civic Centre, a recreational facility and arena, opened in 2003. The arena can seat over 750 spectators and is the home rink for the Mount Allison University women's hockey team.

== Economy ==
Some of the main employers are a Moneris Solutions call centre, Russel Metals, Sackville Memorial Hospital, and Mount Allison University.

Another main employer today is the Correctional Service of Canada, which operates a prison complex now comprising the medium-security (once maximum-security) Dorchester Penitentiary, and the minimum-security Westmorland Institution.

Many residents commute to work in the nearby town of Amherst or the cities of Moncton and Dieppe.

Tourism is centred on the historic and natural features of the area. One of Tantramar's most historic buildings houses the Keillor House Museum. The annual shorebird migration to the mud flats of nearby Johnson's Mills is celebrated by an oversize model of a semi-palmated sandpiper situated in Dorchester square. Other tourist attractions include SappyFest, an annual music festival.

== Arts and culture ==
- The oldest university art museum in Canada, the Owens Art Gallery, which opened in 1895, has a permanent collection of over 4000 works.
- Live Bait Theatre provides theatre and other live performances like dinner theatre, comedy and live music.
- In 2008 the town was given a Government of Canada grant the 300th anniversary of its founding and to mark the 10th anniversary of the opening of its first museum.
- The Sackville Arts Wall celebrates the achievements of Tantramar artists who have made significant contributions to the fields of Literary Arts, Performing Arts, and Visual Arts, as well as Arts Builders who have supported artistic development within the community. Sackville Arts Wall inductees include Alex Colville, Charles G. D. Roberts, Pauline Spatz, Ray Legere, Arthur John Motyer, Douglas Lochhead, Ivan and Vivian Hicks, Sharon MacIntyre, Glenn Adams, K. V. Johansen, Pauline Harborne, Alex Fancy, Ian Hanomansing, Julie Doiron, Mary Connelly, Thaddeus Holownia, Ernie Sears, Delanor R. Wheaton, and Janet Hammock.
- Struts Gallery, is an artist-run-centre established in 1980 dedicated to presenting contemporary art to the public through artist residencies, screenings, and performances.
- SappyFest is an annual independent arts and music festival held in Tantramar, New Brunswick, Canada, launched in 2006. SappyFest was started by Paul Henderson, Jon Claytor, and musician Julie Doiron as an extension of Sappy Records.

== Landmarks ==
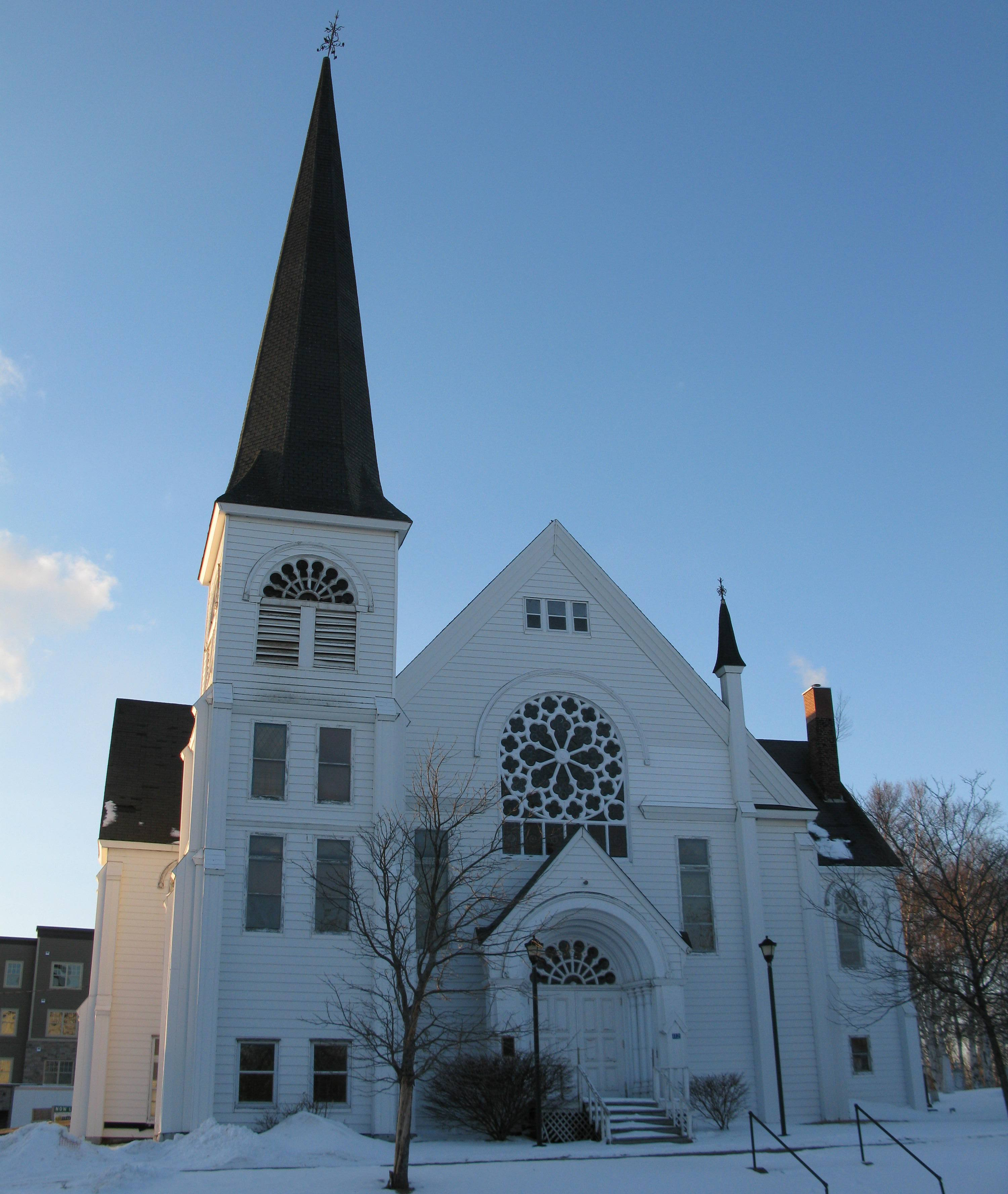
- Sackville United Church, Tantramar, New Brunswick, 2014. Demolished 2015.
  Wheaton Covered Bridge, a 50m-long covered bridge built in 1916 which spans the Tantramar River on the High Marsh Road.
- Cranewood: a Georgian house constructed of local red sandstone in about 1836 by William Crane. It was bought by Josiah Wood in 1867, and remained in the Wood family until 1966. From 1966 to 1975 the house belonged to Dr. W.S.H. Crawford, until it was purchased by Mount Allison University for use as the official residence of the president. In 2013 the Cranewood building was converted into a bakery.
- The Swan Pond, also known as Lily Pond, is located in Ladies' College Park on the campus of Mount Allison University. The pond was excavated in 1901 and a fountain designed by artist John Hammond was added in 1904. The last pair of swans to live in the Swan Pond died in 2015.
- Campbell Carriage Factory: Tantramar's first museum, the Carriage Factory was operated by the Campbell family for over 100 years, closing its doors in the 1950s.
- Captain George Anderson House, an octagon house built in 1855.
- The Boultenhouse Heritage Centre, built by prolific shipbuilder Christopher Boultenhouse in 1840, built onto the front of the Bulmer House, which is believed to be Tantramar's oldest house built in 1790. It houses wallpaper that is original to the house, imported from Paris, and believed to be one of only 3 or 4 examples of this type of wallpaper remaining intact in North America.
- The Sackville Harness Shop was founded in 1919 and made custom hand-crafted leather items, specializing in harnesses and straw collars for draught horses. The building, an example of Gothic Revival architecture, was constructed c. 1846 and is one of the Town's earliest commercial properties. The business closed in 2021.
- The Vogue Cinema: an Art Deco style building built in 1946.
- The Cube is the tallest building in Tantramar. Standing at 44-metre high, it's a featureless white cube-shaped structure which is an enormous automated blueberry and cranberry freezer. Aside from its main use, beginning in 2021, it is also used as a public screen for video art and music videos during SappyFest.
- Fort Beauséjour – Fort Cumberland National Historic Site: In 1751 the French built Fort Beauséjour atop the Aulac Ridge to defend Acadia from British controlled Nova Scotia. The fort serves as a reminder of how strategically important the Isthmus of Chignecto was to the European empires.

== Education ==
Public schooling, run by Anglophone East School District, includes a pre-school, the Salem Elementary School, Marshview Middle School, Dorchester Consolidated School, and Tantramar Regional High School. Tantramar is also home to Mount Allison University.

== Media ==
=== Newspapers/Periodicals ===
- The Argosy is the independent student journal produced by students of Mount Allison University under Argosy Publications Incorporated. Established in 1875, it is one of the oldest official student publications in the country and the first student journal in Atlantic Canada to become independent from its governing institution.

=== Radio ===
- CBAM-FM-1/105.7 is a repeater of CBAM-FM at Moncton.
- CHMA-FM/106.9, known as "The Voice of the Marshes", provides open format and specialty music shows, spoken word programs on a variety of topics as well as audio art programming.
- From 1944 to 2014, Tantramar was home to CKCX, the high-power shortwave transmitter site shared by Radio Canada International and the CBC northern shortwave service.

== Notable people ==
- William Nickerson - Tantramar born winner of the Victoria Cross for actions performed during the Second Boer War.
- Edward Barron Chandler - Father of Confederation. His family home, Chandler House, commonly referred to as Rocklynn, was later inhabited by the Teed family.
- Douglas How (1919–2001) - journalist, magazine editor, and author.
- Sir Pierre-Amand Landry (1846–1916) - Acadian lawyer, judge and political figure.
- Sir Albert James Smith (1822–1883) - politician and opponent of Canadian confederation.
- Forbes Kennedy (born 1935) - hockey player who last played for the Toronto Maple Leafs. Born and raised in Dorchester.
- Matteo Mann - First NHL player to come from Sackville. Drafted by the Philadelphia Flyers in 2024.

== See also ==
- List of communities in New Brunswick
- List of municipalities in New Brunswick
