= New Brunswick Route 935 =

Highway in New Brunswick, Canada

Route 935

Route information
- Maintained by New Brunswick Department of Transportation
- Length: 36 km (22 mi)

Major junctions
- North end: Route 106 in Dorchester
- South end: Route 106 in West Sackville

Location
- Country: Canada
- Province: New Brunswick

Highway system
- Provincial highways in New Brunswick; Former routes
← Route 933	→ Route 940

Route 935 is a 36.3-kilometre (22.6 mi)-long north-to-south secondary highway in the southeastern portion of New Brunswick, Canada.

== Route description ==
Most of the route is in Westmorland County.

The route's northern terminus is in Dorchester at Route 106. It travels southeast through a mostly marsh area where it begins following the Memramcook River. The route passes through Dorchester Cape, then following the Bay of Fundy to Johnson's Mills then turns south east to Upper Rockport. From here, the road turns northeast passing through Wood Point, then passing by British Settlement then Westcock. The route then turns east ending in West Sackville at Route 106 near East Branch Tantramar River.

== Major intersections ==
Location	Mile	Road	Notes
Dorchester	0.00	Route 106	
West Sackville		Route 106	
