= Shep (sculpture) =

Bird sculpture in Dorchester, New Brunswick, Canada

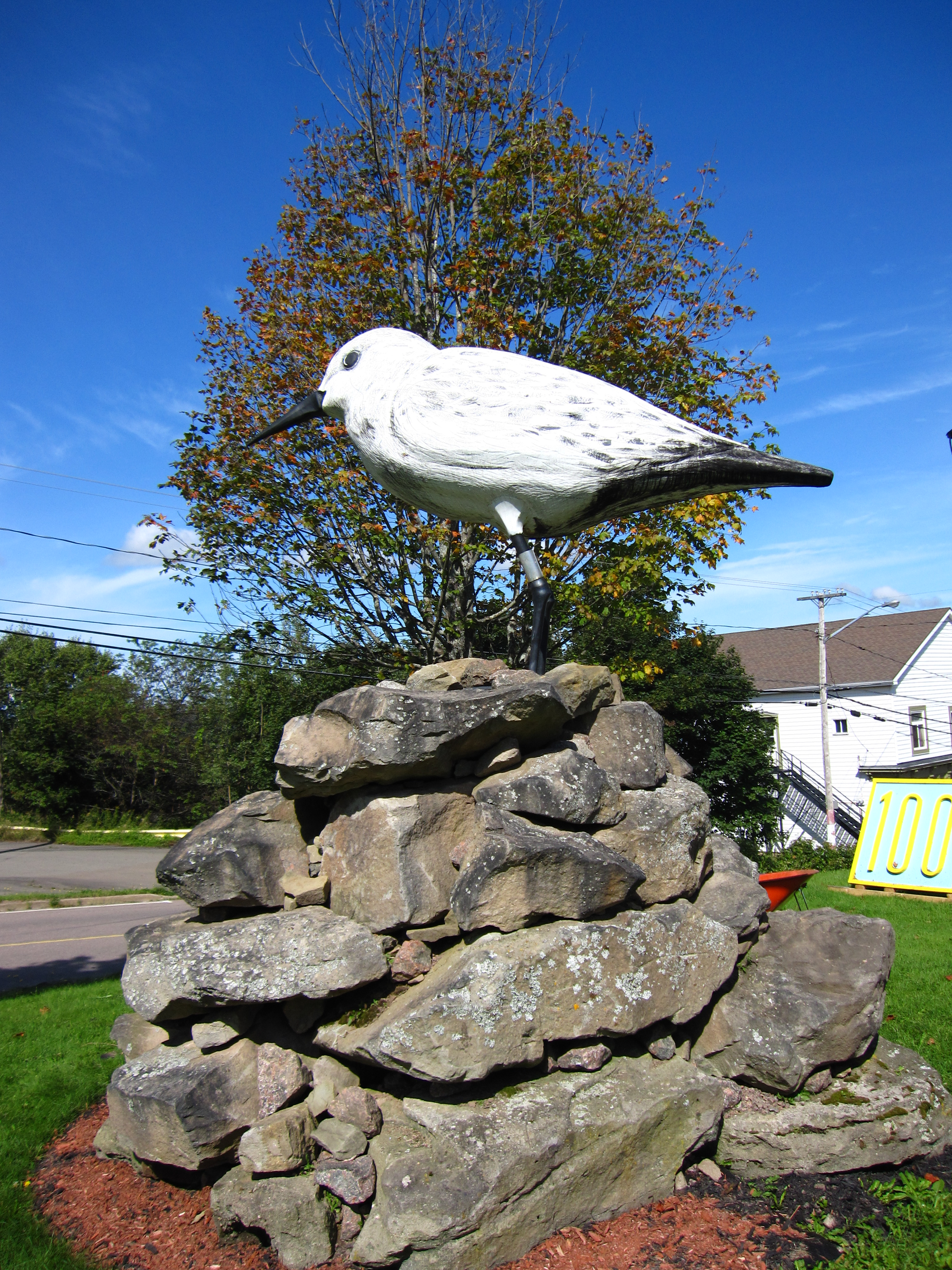
- Original version of Shep in 2011
- Interactive map of Shep
- Location: Dorchester, New Brunswick, Canada
- Coordinates: 45°53′59″N 64°31′00″W
- Designer: Robin Hanson
- Type: Semipalmated sandpiper sculpture
- Material: Steel, fibreglass, epoxy
- Height: 2.4 m (7.9 ft)
- Weight: 135 kg (298 lb)
- Named after: The Shepody Bay

Shep is a large sculpture of a semipalmated sandpiper in Dorchester (now part of Tantramar), New Brunswick, Canada. The current steel, fibreglass, and epoxy sculpture was created by Robin Hanson and installed in 2023 as a replacement for the original wooden version by Monty MacMillan, which stood from 2001 to 2020. Originally installed for the inaugural "Dorchester Sandpiper Festival", the name Shep is derived from the nearby Shepody Bay, which attracts a large amount of migrating semipalmated sandpipers.

== Description ==
Shep depicts a semipalmated sandpiper and is made of steel, fibreglass and epoxy. It stands 2.4 metres (7.9 ft) tall and weighs around 135 kilograms (298 lb). It was installed on April 8, 2023, as a replacement for a previous wooden version. Shep is named after the nearby Shepody Bay, an extension of the Bay of Fundy to which many semipalmated sandpipers migrate during the summer.

== History ==
The original wooden sculpture, made by Monty MacMillan, was carved out of a wooden block weighing 850 pounds (390 kg). It was installed in 2001 for Dorchester's inaugural "Dorchester Sandpiper Festival" event held annually, serving as the "festival and village mascot". The name Shep was chosen as an entrant in the "Name the Sandpiper Contest" and was officially announced in 2002. The original sculpture stood 4.0 metres (13.1 ft) and was referred to as "the world's largest sandpiper". Shep was later repainted in preparation for the 2016 event.

In 2020, the Dorchester village council approved funding for repairs to Shep and for the construction of a viewing platform for it. The sculpture was removed so that MacMillan could make the repairs. In 2021, MacMillan discovered that the wooden sculpture had started rotting. Later in the year, all of his tools were stolen, further delaying the repairs. MacMillan referred Dorchester mayor Debbie Wiggins-Colwell to French Lake-based artist Robin Hanson, who was subsequently commissioned to create a new steel, fibreglass, and epoxy version of Shep, at a cost of CA$9,300.

On January 1, 2023, as a result of the 2023 New Brunswick local governance reform, Dorchester was amalgamated with Sackville into the newly formed town of Tantramar. The new town council considered paying Hanson to be a lower priority, causing individuals and organizations to attempt to raise funds themselves to cover the cost of the replacement sculpture. On April 8, 2023, the new version of Shep was transported to Dorchester and installed by local volunteers—not by municipal officials. This was well-received by residents but caused controversy within the new council. Wiggins-Colwell supported the installation of the new sculpture, while other officials, such as Tantramar mayor Andrew Black, considered it to be an insurance and liability risk to the municipality.

After complaints of violations of the municipal code of conduct were made against Wiggins-Colwell, Montana Consulting was hired in October 2023 to do a third-party investigation. The work by Montana Consulting, which cost the municipality $19,167, culminated in a report that substantiated violations by Wiggins-Colwell, such as a "failure to respect the decision-making process and follow policies, procedures and bylaws". Former Dorchester deputy mayor Kara Becker criticized the investigation, calling it a "witch hunt" and "an embarrassment for the municipality".

== See also ==
- The World's Largest Lobster, another animal sculpture in New Brunswick
