= Upper Point de Bute, New Brunswick =

Human settlement in New Brunswick, Canada

Coordinates: 45°55′28.3″N 64°13′14.2″W

Upper Point de Bute in New Brunswick

Upper Point de Bute is a Canadian rural community in Westmorland County, New Brunswick. Located in the Sackville Parish approximately 7 kilometres northeast of Sackville. It was first settled in 1761 by immigrants from New England and in 1772 by immigrants from England.

== Notable people ==
Richard C. Boxall, architect was commissioned to design a Methodist Church for the Point de Bute congregation in 1881.

== See also ==
- List of communities in New Brunswick
