= Westmorland County =

Westmorland County may refer to more than one place:

- Westmorland County, New Brunswick, Canada
- Westmorland, England, now part of Cumbria
