= Midgic, New Brunswick =

Community in New Brunswick, Canada

Coordinates: 45°58′29.7″N 64°17′30.5″W

Midgic is a rural community in Westmorland County, New Brunswick, Canada.

Located in the Sackville Parish approximately 8 kilometres east of Sackville, Midgic defines the eastern boundary of the Tantramar Marshes.

Population: Approximately 300

== See also ==
- List of communities in New Brunswick
