= Philomène Belliveau =

Canadian artist

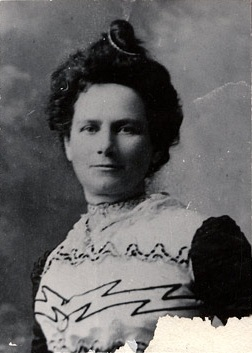
- Born: 29 July 1854; Memramcook
- Died: 17 March 1940; Rimouski
- Occupations: Painter, drawer

Philomène Belliveau (1854 – 1940) was a Canadian artist of Acadian descent.

The daughter of Modeste Cormier and Joseph Belliveau, she was born in Memramcook and was educated at the convent of the Sisters of Sacré Cœur (known as Reed's Castle) in Saint John. In 1889, she travelled to Boston, where she took courses in painting and drawing. After she returned to New Brunswick, her portraits in pastel became very popular. The Acadian museum at the Université de Moncton has four of these portraits in their collection.

In 1904, she married judge Alphonse Pierre Garon. The couple settled in Shediac, later moving to Rimouski.

She died in Rimouski, Quebec, Canada at the age of 85.
