= Ward, New Brunswick =

Railway point in New Brunswick, Canada

Ward
- Railway point
- Interactive map of Ward
- Coordinates: 45°57′54″N 64°19′6″W
- Country: Canada
- Province: New Brunswick
- County: Westmorland
- Parish: Sackville Parish
- Time zone: UTC-4 (Atlantic Standard Time)
  - Summer (DST): UTC-3 (Atlantic Daylight Time)
- Area code: 506

Ward is a Canadian railway point in Westmorland County, New Brunswick, located in the Sackville Parish.

== See also ==
- List of communities in New Brunswick
