= New Brunswick Route 106 =

Highway in New Brunswick

Route 106

Route information
- Maintained by New Brunswick Department of Transportation
- Length: 91.82 km (57.05 mi)
- Existed: 1984–present

Major junctions
- West end: Route 1 / Route 905 in Three Rivers
- Route 1 in River Glade; Route 112 in Salisbury; Route 15 / Route 114 in Moncton; Route 132 in Dieppe
- East end: Route 2 (TCH) in Sackville

Location
- Country: Canada
- Province: New Brunswick
- Major cities: Salisbury, Moncton, Dieppe, Memramcook

Highway system
- Provincial highways in New Brunswick; Former routes
← Route 105	→ Route 107

Route 106 is a highway in New Brunswick, Canada; running from an intersection with Route 1 and the western terminus of Route 905 in Three Rivers to the intersection of Trans-Canada Highway (Route 2) and the southern terminus of Route 940 in Sackville; a distance of 91.8 kilometres.

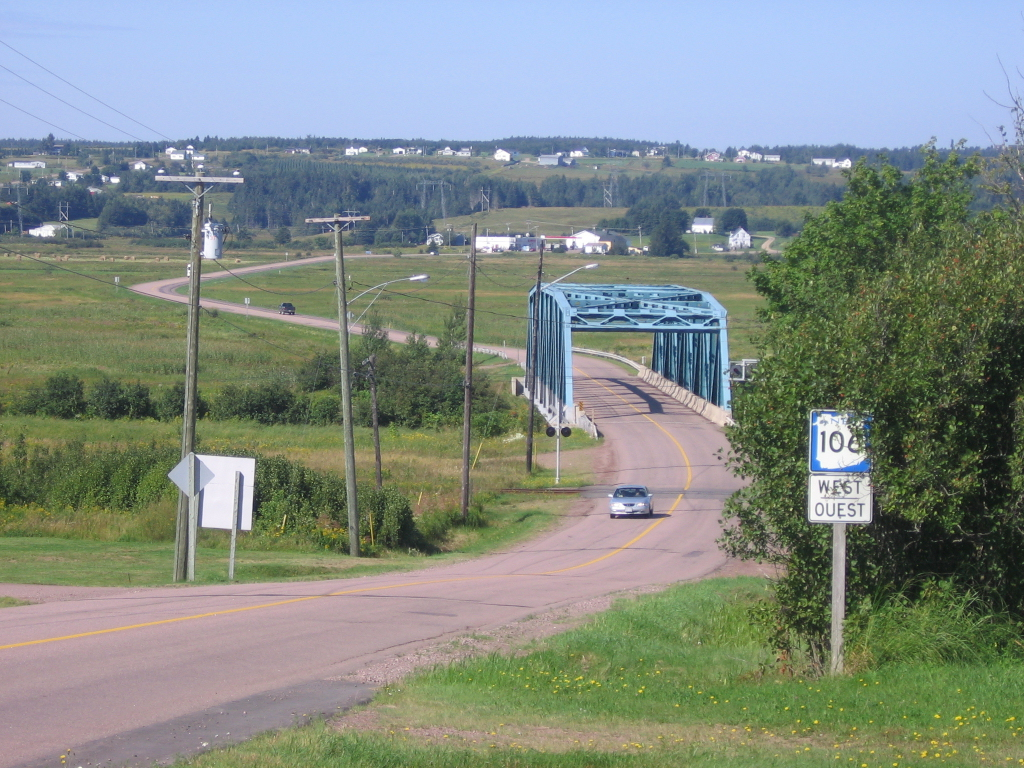
Route 106 crossing the Memramcook River floodplain in southeastern New Brunswick.

From Three Rivers, Route 106 is known as the "Old Post Road" and crosses to the north bank of the Petitcodiac River passing the eastern terminus of Route 885. From here, the route turns northeast, traveling through Petitcodiac East, crossing Route 1 at exit 239 in River Glade and continuing to Salisbury where it briefly merges with Route 112. The route passes through Boundary Creek, then Allison, where it is known as "Salisbury Road" and enters the neighbourhood of Lakeview in Moncton. From here, the route travels around the Petitcodiac Causeway, now known as "Main Street" passing through Downtown Moncton, the southern terminus of Route 15, and into Dieppe.

From Dieppe, Route 106 is known as "Champlain Street", then changes to "Acadie Avenue" at the intersection of Route 132, which leaves the city to the southeast passing through the neighbourhood of Chartersville then Saint-Anselme, then Fox Creek, passing the northern terminus of Route 925. The road continues in a southeasterly direction where it is known as "Vallee Road", passing Folly Lake as it enters Memramcook, where it turns south at the western terminus of Route 933. Here the route is known as "Royal Road", passing the western terminus of Route 925 to follow the east bank of the Memramcook River passing through Upper Dorchester, Middleton, and Dorchester. The route then passes the northern terminus of Route 935, continuing east through Frosty Hollow, then enters Sackville where it is known as "Main Street".

== History ==
Route 106 follows the original routing of Route 2 until the 1950s, when an entirely new limited-access route was constructed (mainly to bypass Moncton). The former route became Route 2A, renumbered Route 6 in 1965. Route 106's current number was adopted in 1984 during a reclassification of provincial highways.

Route 106 was extended west to Three Rivers from its former end at River Glade in 1997 when another section of the Trans-Canada Highway was bypassed.

== Former routes ==
There have been two highways formerly numbered Route 106 in New Brunswick.

The first Route 106 followed the west bank of the Saint John River between Hartland and Perth-Andover between 1965 and 1968, when the Florenceville Bridge opened as part of the Trans-Canada Highway project. The former Route 106 is now part of Route 130 north of Florenceville, and Route 103 south of Florenceville.

The second Route 106 followed the Broad Road from Oromocto to Route 7 at Geary between 1976 and 1984. This route, a former alignment of Route 7, became part of Route 660, but is no longer numbered.

== See also ==
- List of New Brunswick provincial highways
