= William Crane (politician) =

Canadian politician

William Crane (February 15, 1785 – March 31, 1853) was a merchant, judge and long-term elected provincial legislator in New Brunswick, Canada, serving from 1824–1842.He also was a member of the Legislative Council of New Brunswick from 1843–1850.

== Early life and education ==
He was born in Horton Township, Nova Scotia, the son of Jonathan Crane and Rebecca Allison. He was educated there.

== Career ==
Crane later moved to Westmorland County, New Brunswick, where he became a merchant in Sackville. In 1819, Crane went into business with his cousin Charles Frederick Allison. The firm sold goods and exported local products to Great Britain, Nova Scotia and the United States. Crane also served as justice of the peace, justice of the quorum and judge for the Inferior Court of Common Pleas for the county.

In 1824, he was elected to the New Brunswick House of Assembly, where he was repeatedly re-elected and served until 1842. Crane was speaker from 1831 to 1835 and a member of the Executive Council from 1837 to 1843.

Crane was a member of the Legislative Council of New Brunswick from 1843 to 1850. He resigned from the council and served again in the legislative assembly from 1850 until his death in Fredericton in 1853. Crane was speaker from January 1852 to March 1853, when he resigned due to ill health.

== Marriage and family ==
In 1813, Crane married Susannah Dixon of Sackville. They had several children. After her death, in 1838, Crane married Eliza Wood.
