= Little Shemogue, New Brunswick =

Community in New Brunswick, Canada

Coordinates: 46.11521°N 64.020715°W

Little Shemogue in New Brunswick

Little Shemogue is a Canadian rural community in Westmorland County, New Brunswick. The community is based at the confluence of Blacklock, Hardy, and Murray roads, and is located 9 kilometres northeast of Port Elgin.

== See also ==
- List of communities in New Brunswick
