= Captain George Anderson House =

- Location within New Brunswick

General information
- Architectural style: Octagon Mode; frame
- Location: 29 Queens Road, Sackville, New Brunswick, Canada
- Coordinates: 45°54′06″N 64°22′29″W
- Construction started: 1855
- Completed: 1855
- Client: Captain George Anderson

New Brunswick Heritage Conservation Act
- Type: Municipally Registered Property
- Designated: 13 December 2004
- Reference no.: 244

The Captain George Anderson House, also called the Octagonal House, is an octagon house now located in Sackville, New Brunswick. It was built in 1855 by Captain George Anderson, a mariner and shipbuilder. It was later deeded to his father, Captain Titus Anderson and stayed in the Anderson family until 1901. It was used for many years by a foundry company as a storage facility, but was kept in good repair.

In the late 1980s it was bought by the Town of Sackville which restored it and moved it to King St. In June 1989 it became the Sackville Visitor Information Centre. In 2007 the Octagonal House became home to the Sackville Citizens Band and the Tantramar Adult Learning Center. In June 2012, the house was moved next to the Boultenhouse Heritage Centre in Sackville.

It is a National Historic Sites of Canada. In 1999 Sackville designated it a local heritage site.

== See also ==
- List of octagon houses
