= Rockport, New Brunswick =

Coordinates: 45.7323°N 64.4947°W

Rockport is the site of early settlement in Westmorland County, New Brunswick on the Maringouin Peninsula which lies between Shepody Bay and Cumberland Basin and at the northern end of Chignecto Bay. All three bodies of water are extensions of the Bay of Fundy. Other former hamlets or villages on the peninsula include Upper and Lower Rockport, Slacks Cove, Pink Rock, Hard Ledge, and Johnson's Mills. Sandstone and gypsum quarrying was the mainstay of the economy.

== History ==
In 1763 immigrants from Swansea, Massachusetts landed at Slacks Cove and went on to establish the first Baptist church in present-day Canada A lighthouse, now-defunct, was built at Wards Point in 1890 and moved to Pecks Point in 1908.

== See also ==
- List of communities in New Brunswick
