= Westmorland County, New Brunswick =

County in New Brunswick, Canada

Westmorland
- County
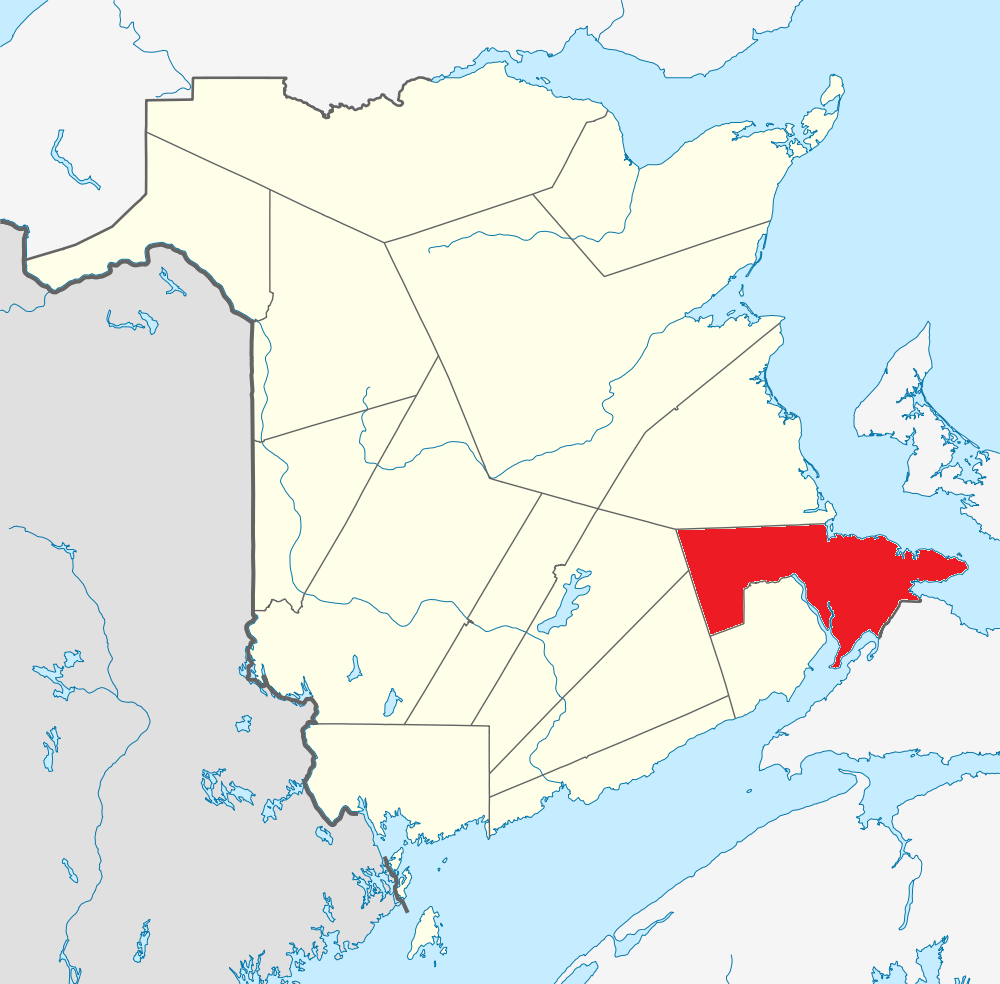
- Location within New Brunswick.
- Coordinates: 46.06°N 64.51°W
- Country: Canada
- Province: New Brunswick
- Established: 1785

Area
  - Land: 3,659.74 km^{2} (1,413.03 sq mi)

Population (2021)
  - Total: 163,576
  - Density: 44.7/km^{2} (116/sq mi)
  - Change 2016-2021: ▲9.3%
  - Dwellings: 75,506
- Time zone: UTC-4 (AST)
  - Summer (DST): UTC-3 (ADT)
- Area code: 506

Westmorland County (2021 population: 163,576) is a county in New Brunswick, a province of Canada. It is in the southeastern part of the province. It contains the fast-growing commercial centre of Moncton and its northern and eastern suburbs. Also located in the county are the university town of Sackville and the local tourist destination of Shediac.

Westmorland County is centrally located in the Maritimes and is New Brunswick's most populous county. Fishing and tourism are important industries along the Northumberland Strait shore, and there is some mixed farming in the Petitcodiac River Valley and in the Tantramar Marsh region. The city of Moncton accounts for half of the county's population and has developed as a major transportation, distribution, commercial and retail centre. Dorchester is the historic shire town.

== Origins ==
The county, once a part of Cumberland County, Nova Scotia, was one of the original eight counties delineated shortly after the creation of the British colony of New Brunswick in 1784. Initially it included what is now Albert County and part of Saint John County.

Due to sweeping social reforms of the Louis Robichaud premiership, the counties no longer serve their role as regional local government and administrative units.

== Transportation ==
=== Major highways ===
- Route 2 (TCH)
- Route 15
- Route 16 (TCH)
- Route 106
- Route 112
- Route 114
- Route 126
- Route 128

== Census subdivisions ==
=== Communities ===
There were the eleven municipalities within Westmorland County before the 2023 local governance reforms (listed with 2021 figures):

Official name	Designation	Area km^{2}	Population	Parish
Moncton	City	141.92	79,470	Moncton
Dieppe	City	54.05	28,114	Dorchester, Moncton
Shediac	Town	53.95	7,535	Shediac
Beaubassin East	Rural community	291.08	6,718	Botsford, Shediac
Sackville	Town	74.17	6,099	Sackville
Memramcook	Village	187.67	5,029	Dorchester
Cap-Pelé	Village	23.36	2,441	Botsford, Shediac
Salisbury	Village	13.54	2,387	Salisbury
Petitcodiac	Village	17.21	1,476	Salisbury
Dorchester	Village	5.79	906	Dorchester
Port Elgin	Village	2.66	381	Sackville, Westmorland

=== First Nations ===
There is one First Nations reserve in Westmorland County (population as of 2021):

Official name	Designation	Area km^{2}	Population	Parish
Fort Folly 1	Reserve	0.55	36	Dorchester

=== Parishes ===
The county is subdivided into seven parishes (listed by 2016 population):

Official name	Area km^{2}	Population	Municipalities	Unincorporated communities
Moncton	579.63	10,704	Moncton (city); Dieppe (city)	Allison / Ammon / Berry Mills / Boundary Creek / Canaan / Cape Breton / Gallagher Ridge / Greater Lakeburn / Indian Mountain / Irishtown / Lakeville / LeBlancville / Lutesville / McQuade / Meadow Brook / Melanson Settlement / New Scotland / O'Neil / Pacific Junction / Painsec / Painsec Junction / Scotch Settlement / Shaw Brook / Steeves Mountain / Stilesville
Shediac	196.71	5,144	Beaubassin East (rural community); Shediac (town)	Basse-Aboujagane / Batemans Mills / Bourgeois Mills / Chapman Corner / East Shediac / Evangeline / Haute-Aboujagane / MacDougall / Malakoff / Moncton Road / Petit Pre / Ohio-du-Barachois / Pointe-du-Chêne / Saint-Philippe / Scoudouc / Scoudouc Road / Shediac Bridge-Shediac River / Shediac Cape / Shediac Road / The Bluff
Salisbury	874.16	3,377	Salisbury (village); Petitcodiac (village)	Dobsons Corner / Fawcett / Fawcett Hill / Fredericton Road / Glenvale / Harewood / Havelock / Hicksville / Hillgrove / Intervale / Kay Settlement / Killams Mills / Kinnear Settlement / Leeman Hill / Lewis Mountain / Monteagle / North Branch / Pollett River / River Glade / Scott Road / Second North River / Steeves Settlement / The Glades / Upper Ridge / Wheaton Settlement
Sackville	579.98	1,204	Sackville (town)	Aboushagan Road / Anderson Settlement / Babcock Road / British Settlement / Brooklyn / Brooklyn Road / Centre Village / Coles Island Road / Cookville / Evans / Fairfield / Harper's Brook / Johnson's Mills / Lower Rockport / Midgic / Rockport / Upper Rockport / Ward / West Sackville / Westcock / Wood Point / Woodhurst
Botsford	304.16	1,120	Cap-Pelé (village)	Bayfield / Bayside / Botsford / Cadman Corner / Cape Spear / Cape Tormentine / Chapmans Corner / Hardy / Johnston Point Road / Little Shemogue / Malden / Mates Corner / Melrose / Murray Corner / Murray Road / Petit-Cap / Smith Settlement / Spence Settlement / The Bluff / Timber River / Westmorland / Upper Cape / Woodside
Westmorland	175.43	997	Port Elgin (village)	Aulac / Baie-Verte / Baie Verte Road / Coburg / Etter Ridge / Fromm's Swamp / Halls Hill / Jolicure / Mount Whatley / Pointe de Bute / Tidnish Bridge / Uniacke Hill / Upper Point de Bute / Westmorland
Dorchester	90.13	438	Memramcook (village); Dorchester (village); Fort Folly 1 (reservation)	Calhoun / Cherry Burton / Dorchester Cape / Middleton / Taylor Village / Upper Dorchester

== Demographics ==
Historical Census Data - Westmorland County, New Brunswick
Year	Pop.	±%
1991	114,745	—
1996	120,531	+5.0%
2001	124,688	+3.4%
2006	132,849	+6.5%
2011	144,158	+8.5%
2016	149,623	+3.8%
2021	163,576	+9.3%

As a census division in the 2021 Census of Population conducted by Statistics Canada, Westmorland County had a population of 163,576 living in 70,090 of its 75,506 total private dwellings, a change of 9.3% from its 2016 population of 149,623. With a land area of 3,659.74 km^{2} (1,413.03 sq mi), it had a population density of 44.7/km^{2} (115.8/sq mi) in 2021.

Canada census – Westmorland County, New Brunswick community profile

	2016	2011
Population	149,623 (+3.8% from 2011)	144,158 (+8.5% from 2006)
Land area	3,666.15 km^{2} (1,415.51 sq mi)	3,662.02 km^{2} (1,413.91 sq mi)
Population density	40.8/km^{2} (106/sq mi)	39.4/km^{2} (102/sq mi)
Median age	43.1 (M: 42.2, F: 43.9)	41.4 (M: 40.5, F: 42.4)
Private dwellings	71,839 (total)	67,842 (total)
Median household income	$61,903	$55,736

References: 2016 2011

=== Language ===
The dominant dialect of Acadian French spoken in Westmorland County is Chiac.

Canada Census Mother Tongue - Westmorland County, New Brunswick
Census	Total	English			French			French & English			Non-official languages		
Year	Responses	Count	Trend	Pop %	Count	Trend	Pop %	Count	Trend	Pop %	Count	Trend	Pop %
2016	146,610	77,450	▲1.3%	52.83%	60,570	▲3.0%	41.31%	2,430	▲13.0%	1.66%	6,160	▲74.0%	4.20%
2011	140,925	76,475	▲7.8%	54.27%	58,795	▲7.2%	41.72%	2,115	▲67.2%	1.50%	3,540	▲17.6%	2.51%
2006	130,080	70,945	▲3.6%	54.54%	54,860	▲7.4%	42.17%	1,265	▼6.3%	0.97%	3,010	▲102.7%	2.31%
2001	122,405	68,510	▲1.2%	55.97%	51,060	▲6.7%	41.71%	1,350	▼7.2%	1.10%	1,485	▲12.9%	1.21%
1996	118,330	67,700	n/a	57.21%	47,860	n/a	40.45%	1,455	n/a	1.23%	1,315	n/a	1.11%

== Access routes ==
Highways and numbered routes that run through the county, including external routes that start or finish at the county limits:

- Highways
  - Route 1
  - Route 2 (TCH)
  - Route 15
  - Route 16 (TCH)
- Principal Routes
  - Route 106
  - Route 112
  - Route 115
  - Route 126
  - Route 128
  - Route 132
  - Route 133
  - Route 134
  - Route 140
- Secondary Routes:
  - Route 490
  - Route 880
  - Route 885
  - Route 890
  - Route 905
  - Route 925
  - Route 933
  - Route 935
  - Route 940
  - Route 945
  - Route 950
  - Route 955
  - Route 960
- External Routes:
  - Route 1 (TCH)
  - Hwy 104 (TCH)

== See also ==
- List of communities in New Brunswick
- List of historic places in Westmorland County, New Brunswick
- List of people from Westmorland County, New Brunswick
