= New Brunswick Route 925 =

Highway in New Brunswick, Canada

Coordinates: 45.984737°N 64.666901°W

Route 925

Route information
- Maintained by New Brunswick Department of Transportation
- Length: 21 km (13 mi)

Major junctions
- North end: Route 106 in Upper Dover
- South end: Route 106 in College Bridge

Location
- Country: Canada
- Province: New Brunswick

Highway system
- Provincial highways in New Brunswick; Former routes
← Route 915	→ Route 933

Route 925 is a 20.5-kilometre (12.7 mi) long north to south secondary highway in the southeastern portion of New Brunswick, Canada.

== Route description ==
Most of the route is in Westmorland County.

The route's northern terminus is in Dieppe at Route 106. It travels southeast through a mostly swamp area where it begins following the Petitcodiac River passing through the Dieppe neighbourhood of Upper Dover. The route continues south crossing the Memramcook River as it enters the village of Memramcook neighbourhood of Dover where the route is known as Rue Principale. The route then passes through Gautreau Village then Pre-d'en-Haut where the route turns east passing Saint-Joseph as it crosses the Memramcook River then ending in College Bridge at Route 106 near Memramcook Lake.
