= Woodhurst, New Brunswick =

Coordinates: 45.9441755°N 64.483979°W

Woodhurst is an unincorporated community in Westmorland County, New Brunswick. The community is situated in Southeastern New Brunswick, to the southeast of Moncton. Woodhurst is part of Greater Moncton.

== See also ==
- List of communities in New Brunswick
