= Halls Hill, New Brunswick =

Community in New Brunswick, Canada

Coordinates: 45°59′32.96″N 64°8′23.18″W

Halls Hill in New Brunswick

Halls Hill is a community about 20 kilometres northeast of Sackville, New Brunswick, Canada.

== See also ==
- List of communities in New Brunswick
