= Jolicure, New Brunswick =

Community in New Brunswick, Canada

Coordinates: 45°56′38.4″N 64°12′58.9″W

Jolicure in New Brunswick

Jolicure is a small community about ten kilometres northeast of Sackville, Canada on Jolicure Road off Route 16.

== See also ==
- List of communities in New Brunswick
