= Taylor Village, New Brunswick =

Coordinates: 45.9322323°N 64.5486017°W

Taylor Village is an unincorporated community in Westmorland County, New Brunswick. The community is situated in Southeastern New Brunswick, to the south-east of Moncton.

== See also ==
- List of communities in New Brunswick
