= British Settlement, New Brunswick =

Community in New Brunswick, Canada

Coordinates: 45°51′42.8″N 64°23′43.9″W

British Settlement in New Brunswick

British Settlement is a community in Westmorland County, New Brunswick, Canada about eight kilometres southwest of Sackville.

== See also ==
- List of communities in New Brunswick
