= Russel Metals =

Canadian metals company

Russel Metals Inc.
- Type: Public
- Traded as: TSX: RUS; S&P/TSX Composite Component
- Industry: Metal Products
- Founded: 1929
- Headquarters: Mississauga, Ontario, Canada
- Key people: John Reid (President & CEO); Martin Juravsky (CFO); Jim Dinning (Chairman)
- Website: www.russelmetals.com

Russel Metals Inc. is a Canadian metals distribution and processing company. It is one of North America's largest metal distribution companies, with operations across Canada and the United States.

== History ==
The company was originally established in 1929 as Federal Grain Limited, through a merger of several grain-handling firms. In 1972, the company sold its grain assets to several grain pools, and it then renamed itself as Federal Industries Ltd.

After 1978, under the leadership of CEO John Fraser, the company expanded into a diverse range of industries, including bookstores, trucking and airplane parts. One of the businesses acquired was metals firm Hugh Russel & Sons Ltd., which had originally been founded in 1785 as John Russel & Co. in Montreal by Scottish-born merchant John Russel. The company also acquired the narrow-gauge Yukon and White Pass Railroad, which shipped freight between Whitehorse, Yukon, and Skagway, Alaska (eventually sold in 1997).

The company's expansion into diverse business lines was not successful, and it experienced significant losses during a recession in the 1990s. As a result, it sold off many of its non-core assets to focus on metals distribution and processing. As part of this process, the company renamed itself as Russel Metals Inc. in 1995. After a 1997 proxy battle involving businessman K. Rai Sahi, John Fraser and CEO John Pelton resigned, and the company narrowed its focus on metals under new CEO Bud Siegal.

In 2007, Russel acquired JMS Metal Products, a U.S. metals distributor, for $125 million. In 2009, the company experienced significant losses as part of the great recession and laid off 500 of its 3,000 employees. In 2012, the company acquired Apex Distribution, a Calgary-based metals distribution business focusing on the oil and gas industry.

== Business ==
Russel Metals primarily operates metal distribution and service centres for customers in the oil and gas, manufacturing, and construction industries. It has three business segments: metals service centres, energy products, and steel distributors. As of 2017, 49% of revenue was from the service centres, 39% was from energy products, and the rest was from steel distribution. It has sites in both Canada and the United States, with most sites located in Canada, and derives roughly 30 per cent of its revenues from the United States.
