= Upper Dorchester, New Brunswick =

Coordinates: 45.9526175°N 64.5387674°W

Upper Dorchester is an unincorporated community in Westmorland County, New Brunswick. The community is situated in Southeastern New Brunswick, to the south-east of Moncton. Upper Dorchester is part of Greater Moncton.

== See also ==
- List of communities in New Brunswick
