= Anderson Settlement, New Brunswick =

Community in New Brunswick, Canada

Coordinates: 46.113°N 64.249°W

Location of Anderson Settlement in New Brunswick

Anderson Settlement is a community in the Canadian province of New Brunswick.

== See also ==
- List of communities in New Brunswick
