= Calhoun, New Brunswick =

Coordinates: 46.0825643°N 64.5977484°W

Calhoun is an unincorporated community in Westmorland County, New Brunswick. The community is situated in southeastern New Brunswick, to the east of Moncton, and is part of Greater Moncton.

== History ==
In 1898, Calhoun had one post office, store, and steam sawmill. The population was around 150.

This community used to have a railway station, although not much else is known other than its name, Calhoun Station

In mid 2021, residents of Calhoun expressed frustration at the local government because of their plan to construct a fifth rock quarry in the area. Everyone in the community was against it, except Local Governance Minister Daniel Allain. Due to him, the project eventually came through.

== See also ==
- List of communities in New Brunswick
