= Middleton, New Brunswick =

Coordinates: 45.9190898°N 64.514764°W

Middleton is an unincorporated community in Westmorland County, New Brunswick. The community is situated in Southeastern New Brunswick, to the east of Moncton. It is part of Greater Moncton.

== See also ==
- List of communities in New Brunswick
