= Dorchester, New Brunswick =

Dorchester
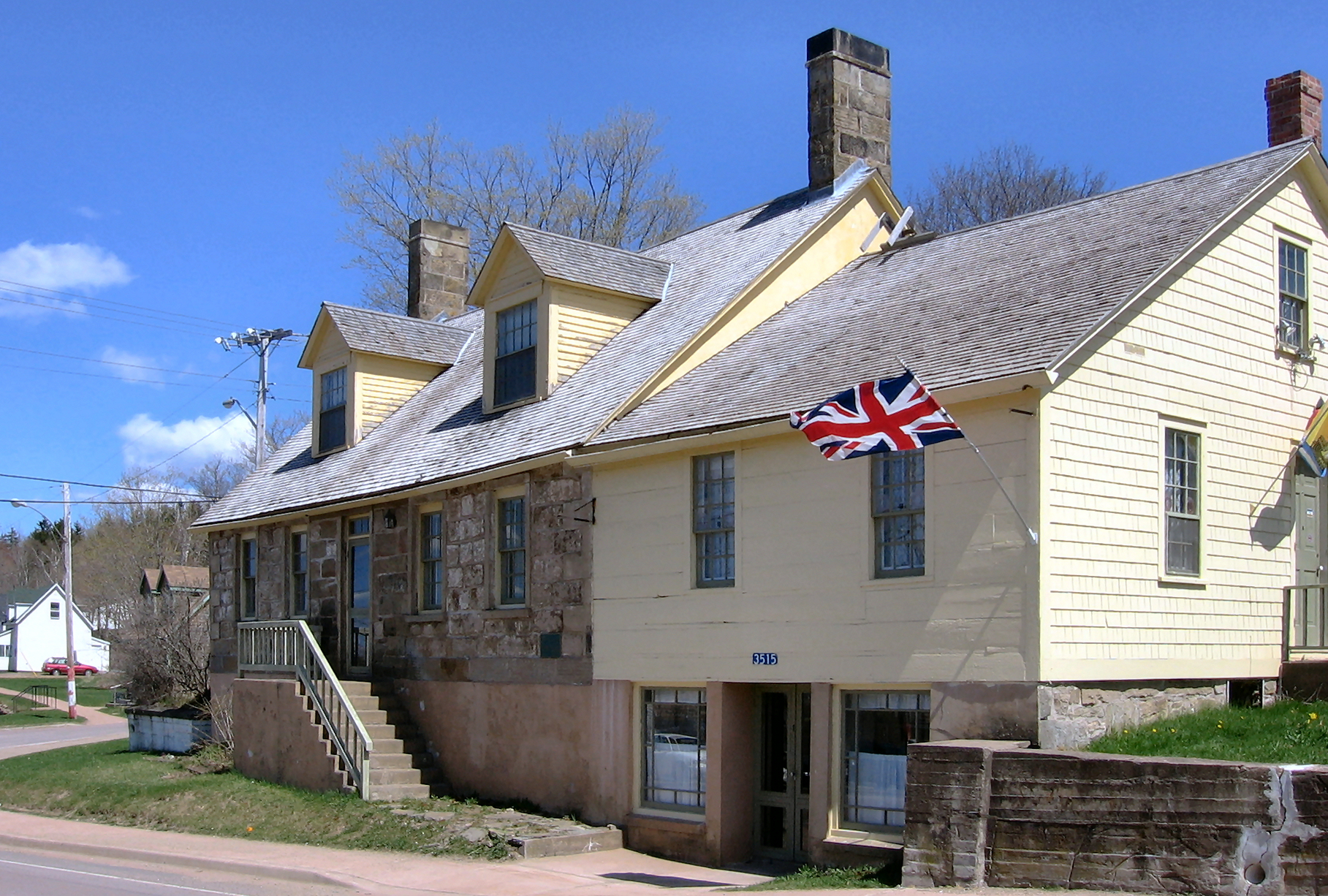
- The old Bell Inn in Dorchester, New Brunswick was an inn between 1820 and 1860.

- Location of Dorchester, New Brunswick
- Coordinates: 45°54′5.6″N 64°30′57.9″W
- Country: Canada
- Province: New Brunswick
- County: Westmorland
- Parish: Dorchester Parish
- Town: Tantramar

Area
  - Land: 5.71 km^{2} (2.20 sq mi)

Population (2021)
  - Total: 906
  - Density: 158.7/km^{2} (411/sq mi)
  - Change 2016–21: ▼17.3%
- Time zone: UTC-4 (Atlantic)
  - Summer (DST): UTC-3 (Atlantic)
- Area code: Area code 506
- Dwellings: 221
- Website: www.dorchester.ca

Dorchester is a community in Westmorland County, New Brunswick, Canada. The community became part of the new town of Tantramar in the 2023 New Brunswick local governance reform. Originally incorporated as a town (Note: Incorporated exclusively for fire protection and street lighting, it did not fall under the Towns Act.) in 1911, it was converted to a village in 1966. By 1825 it had been named for Guy Carleton, 1st Baron Dorchester, an 18th-century Governor-General of the old Province of Quebec, but prior to that was called Botsford.

It is located on the eastern side of the mouth of the lush Memramcook River valley near the river's discharge point into Shepody Bay. Dorchester is an English-speaking community but it is adjacent to French-speaking Acadian areas farther up the Memramcook River valley.

== History ==
The shire town of the county, Dorchester has several fine historic homes and civic buildings most of which were built by local lawyer and Master Builder, John Francis Teed. During the 19th century, Dorchester and neighbouring Dorchester Island were important shipbuilding centres. Numerous master mariners also lived in Dorchester and vicinity during the Golden Age of Sail. Prior to rail service, it was a centre for the stagecoach, as well as a busy ship port. The community was transformed with the construction in 1872 of the Intercolonial Railway between Halifax and Rivière-du-Loup. In 1911, the village founded the Dorchester Light and Fire Company which is now known as the Dorchester Volunteer Fire Department. In 1965, the village courthouse was destroyed by arson. Many in the community came to the town square to watch the building burn. The only thing left of the courthouse was the safe. It is now used in the village hall where the courthouse once stood. The courthouse was never rebuilt, and much of the economy behind it left the community.

Dorchester was home to Edward Barron Chandler, a father of confederation and his family who built their home, Chandler House, commonly referred to as Rocklynn which is now a nationally recognized historic property.

Premier Louis Robichaud's government during the 1960s created an industrial park, the Westmorland Chemical Park, and deepwater loading pier at nearby Dorchester Cape as part of a regional economic development program. Envisioned to be used by the petro-chemical industry, the government constructed a new road and railway spur along with an electrical substation and the pier as well as a building that was envisioned to be used as a fertilizer plant. The industrial park had no tenants and the pier sitting in the Memramcook River was quickly silted in by mud from the tides of the Bay of Fundy. Today all that remains are the roads and the railbed as well as some broken street lights, a deteriorating sea wall and the empty shell of the abandoned fertilizer plant.

In 1998, the Dorchester Jail was also closed. It is currently a fitness gym and a bed and breakfast.

On 1 January 2023, Dorchester amalgamated with the town of Sackville and parts of three local service districts to form the new town of Tantramar. The community's name remains in official use.

== Demographics ==
In the 2021 Census of Population conducted by Statistics Canada, Dorchester had a population of 906 living in 207 of its 221 total private dwellings, a change of −17.3% from its 2016 population of 1,096. With a land area of 5.71 km^{2} (2.20 sq mi), it had a population density of 158.7/km^{2} (411.0/sq mi) in 2021.

Population trend

Census	Population	Change (%)
2021	906	▼17.3%
2016	1,096	▼6.1%
2011	1,167	▲4.3%
2006	1,119	▲17.3%
2001	954	▼19.1%
1996	1,179	▲39.0%
1991	848	▼41.3%
1986	1,198	▲8.8%
1981	1,101	N/A

Income (2015)

Income type	By CAD
Median Total income per capita	$28,501
Median Household Income	$49,280
Median Family Income	$59,392

Mother tongue (2016)

Language	Population	Pct (%)
English	390	90.7%
French	35	8.1%
Other languages	5	1.2%
English and French	0	0%

== Economy ==
The village's main employer today is the Correctional Service of Canada, which operates a prison complex now comprising the medium-security (once maximum-security) Dorchester Penitentiary, and the minimum-security Westmorland Institution.

Many residents commute to work in the nearby towns of Sackville and Amherst or the cities of Moncton and Dieppe.

A recent influx of residents is creating a new demand for Dorchester.

Tourism is centred on the historic and natural features of the area. One of Dorchester's most historic buildings houses the Keillor House Museum. The annual shorebird migration to the mud flats of nearby Johnson's Mills is celebrated by an oversize model of a semi-palmated sandpiper situated in the village square.

== Transportation ==
Although situated on the CN Rail main line between Halifax and Montreal, Dorchester no longer has a passenger station, with travellers having to entrain/detrain in Sackville or Moncton. The nearest airport is the Greater Moncton International Airport, a 40 km drive in Dieppe.

== Notable people ==
- William Nickerson, Dorchester-born recipient of the Victoria Cross for actions performed during the Second Boer War
- Edward Barron Chandler, Father of Confederation; his family home, Chandler House, commonly referred to as Rocklynn, was later inhabited by the Teed family
- Douglas How (1919–2001), journalist, magazine editor, and author
- Pierre-Amand Landry (1846–1916), Acadian lawyer, judge and political figure
- Albert James Smith (1822–1883), politician and opponent of Canadian confederation
- Forbes Kennedy (1935–2026), hockey player who last played for the Toronto Maple Leafs

== See also ==
- List of communities in New Brunswick
- Greater Moncton, New Brunswick
- Greater Shediac, New Brunswick

== Trivia ==
- Dorchester appears fictionalized in Douglas How's humorous book Blow Up the Trumpet in the New Moon (1993).
- The song Dorchester by Matt Minglewood is about the Dorchester Penitentiary.
- Dorchester is home to what may be the world's largest sculpture of a sandpiper, Shep.
- The Bell Inn Restaurant is one of New Brunswick's oldest surviving stone buildings, built sometime between 1811 and 1821. It is also in the book of Where To Eat In Canada.
- The Dorchester Jail was the location of the last double hanging in New Brunswick, in September 1936
