= Mount Whatley, New Brunswick =

Community in New Brunswick, Canada

Coordinates: 45°52′53.9″N 64°15′39.9″W

Mount Whatley in New Brunswick

Mount Whatley is a community in the Canadian province of New Brunswick, located in Westmorland County on New Brunswick Highway 16. Mount Whatley is situated upon the Aulac Ridge, a prominent rise running west–east across the Tantramar Marshes on the Isthmus of Chignecto, on the shore of the Missaguash River which forms the southern part of the inter-provincial boundary with Nova Scotia.The community is linked by a small bridge to Fort Lawrence Nova Scotia .

== See also ==
- List of communities in New Brunswick
