= Dorchester Cape, New Brunswick =

Coordinates: 45.8681648°N 64.5305261°W

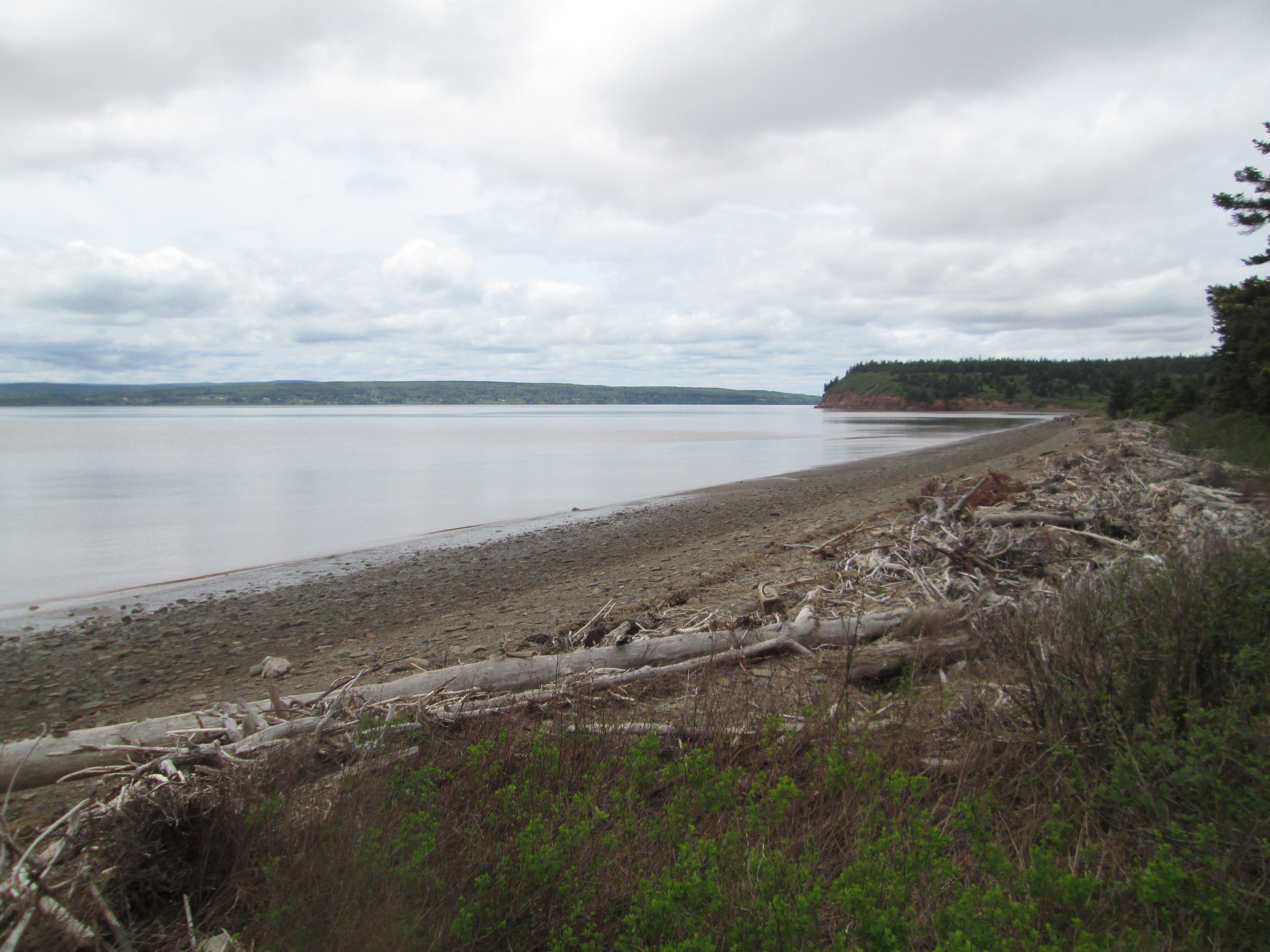

Dorchester Cape is an unincorporated community in Westmorland County, New Brunswick. The community is situated in Southeastern New Brunswick, to the east of Moncton.

== History ==
In the 1960s, the provincial government constructed the Westmorland Chemical Park in the area.

== See also ==
- List of communities in New Brunswick
