= Sackville, New Brunswick =

Sackville
- Bridge Street in downtown Sackville

- Seal
- Motto: A different kind of small town
- Location within New Brunswick
- Coordinates: 45.89792°N 64.36834°W
- Country: Canada
- Province: New Brunswick
- County: Westmorland
- Parish: Sackville Parish
- Town: Tantramar
- Established: 1762
- Incorporated: January 4, 1903 (as Town of Sackville)
- Amalgamated: January 1, 2023 (into Town of Tantramar)
- Federal electoral district: Beauséjour
- Provincial electoral district: Memramcook-Tantramar

Government
  - MLA: Megan Mitton Green Party of New Brunswick
  - MP: Dominic LeBlanc (L)

Area
  - Land: 73.91 km^{2} (28.54 sq mi)
- Highest elevation: 32 m (105 ft)
- Lowest elevation: 0 m (0 ft)

Population (2021)
  - Total: 6,099
  - Density: 82.5/km^{2} (214/sq mi)
  - Change (2016–21): ▲14.4%
- Demonym: Sackvillian
- Time zone: UTC-4 (Atlantic (AST))
  - Summer (DST): UTC-3 (ADT)
- Canadian Postal code: E4L
- Area code: 506
- Telephone Exchange: 360, 364, 536, 540, 939, 940
- NTS Map: 21H16 Amherst
- GNBC Code: DAEAM
- Website: www.sackville.com

Sackville is a former town in southeastern New Brunswick, Canada. It held town status prior to 2023 and is now part of the town of Tantramar.

Sackville is home to Mount Allison University, a primarily undergraduate liberal arts university. The university welcomes roughly 2200 students per academic year. Historically based on agriculture, shipbuilding, and manufacturing, the economy is now driven by the university and tourism. Initially part of the French colony of Acadia, the settlement became part of the British colony of Nova Scotia in 1755 following the Expulsion of the Acadians.

== History ==
=== Pre-European ===
Present-day Sackville is in the Mi’kmaq district of Siknikt (to which the place name Chignecto may be traced), which roughly comprised Cumberland, Westmorland and part of Albert counties. The Mi’kmaq settlement, Goesomaligeg, was on Fort Beausejour Ridge and Tatamalg or Tantama, on the Sackville Ridge. Many regional toponyms are Mi’kmaq including Tidnish, Minudie, Missaguash River, Aboushagan Road, Midgic, Memramcook and Shemogue. A portage connected Beaubassin by way of Westcock and the valley now known as Frosty Hollow with the Memramcook and Petitcodiac rivers and was an important link in the communications system between Acadia and Quebec.

=== French colony (1670s-1755) ===
The first Acadians arrived in the early 1670s, as the French colony expanded from its base at Port Royal. Many of the Acadians came from the west of France and were experienced in reclaiming from the sea lowlands that might be made arable. The Tantramar Marshes were well suited to this, and the Acadians built a system of dykes and sluices that allowed them to cultivate the marshes. Surveyor Charles Morris visited in 1748, and reported Acadian settlements at Westcock; Pré des Bourgs, (Sackville); Pré des Richards, (Middle Sackville); Tintamare, (Upper Sackville); La Butte, Le Coup, Le Lac (Aulac); Portage, at the head of the Missaguash River; Beaubassin (adjacent to Beausejour); Jolicoeur, (Jolicure) and Pont à Buot, (Point de Bute). Farther afield, there were settlements at La Planche (Amherst) and Baie Verte for a total population of about 3,000. Settlements were connected by trails and separated by marsh. A seaport at Westcock provided a link to Port Royal.

=== British conquest and resettlement ===
The Treaty of Utrecht in 1713 had ceded Acadia to England, but without specifying where the boundary was between Acadia and what remained of New France. This led to ongoing skirmishes until June 1755 when, as part of a wider struggle of the British and French of North American colonies, the French were defeated at the Battle of Beausejour. This led to the removal of most of the French military from Acadia. Six weeks later, Governor Charles Lawrence, without distinguishing between neutral Acadians and those who had resisted the British, wrote that the Acadians "shall be removed out of the country as soon as possible, and as to those about the isthmus who were in arms and therefore entitled to no favour from the government it is determined to begin with them first". This marked the beginning of the expulsion of the Acadians. They were only allowed to take with them their ready money and household furniture, and their buildings were burned to the ground.

Following the expulsion of the Acadians the British needed to repopulate the colony. The first wave of immigration was the New England Planters who were invited and encouraged with land grants. The Sackville area was abandoned for six years after the expulsion of the Acadians until 1761 when 25 families from Rhode Island settled on the vacated Acadian farms, followed in 1763 by a group of 13 from Swansea, Massachusetts, who formed the first Baptist church in Canada, but subsequently returned to New England. In 1763 the population was 20 families on 200 acres of cleared (probably by the Acadians) upland, and also marshlands. A 1767 census gives the population as 349, of which 343 were Americans. The Sackville Township, named after Viscount Sackville, was formally created in 1765 and by 1772 was sufficiently populated to send a representative to the Nova Scotia House of Assembly.

The Yorkshire Emigration started in 1772 and lasted about three years. They arrived too late to occupy the vacated Acadian farms which had already been granted to the New Englanders. However many New Englanders did not stay, and sold the land on to the British immigrants.

When the American War of Independence broke out in 1775, many of the American settlers in the area were sympathetic with the Americans, and rebels led by Jonathan Eddy laid siege to Fort Cumberland. However the rebels were repelled by soldiers, with help from the Yorkshire settlers who remained loyal to the crown. When the war was over, United Empire Loyalists, emigrated north, some to the Sackville area. By 1786 there were 60 families in the township.

=== Industrialization and shipbuilding ===
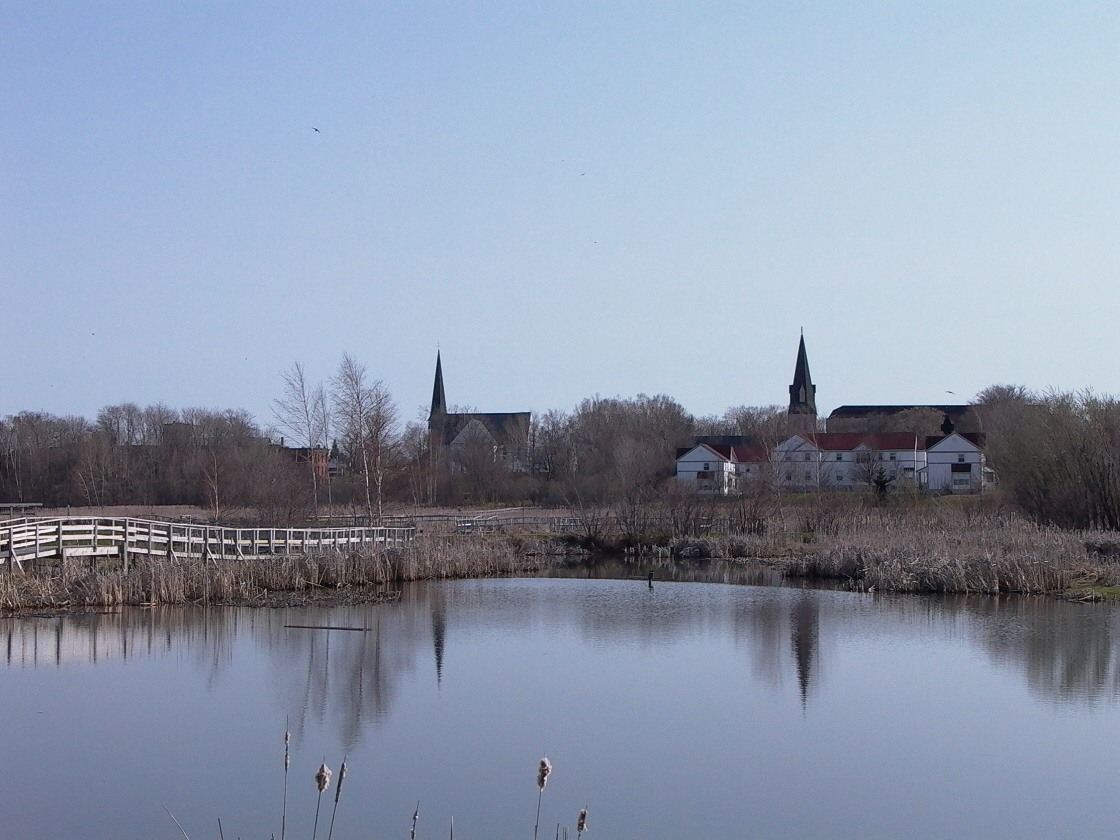
Waterfowl Park

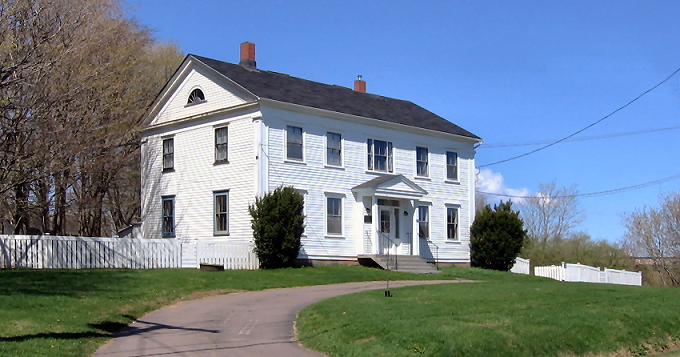
Historic home of Christopher Boultenhouse is maintained as the Boultenhouse Heritage Centre to commemorate the region's shipbuilders

By the 1830s tanneries, leather goods factories, carriage factories and blacksmith shops were active around Morice Mill Pond (renamed recently to Silver Lake) a few kilometres north of the current town centre. The centre of activity started to shift to the present downtown area when in 1836 William Crane moved his business to the site of the former town hall, and built his house across the street. He also donated land for a small Methodist chapel that was built in 1838 and later evolved into the much larger Sackville Methodist/United Church. In 1839, Charles Frederick Allison donated money and land to establish the Mount Allison Wesleyan Academy, which became Mount Allison University. This was followed by the development of shipyards on the Tantramar River. Official records for shipbuilding in New Brunswick began in 1824, but by that time shipbuilding was already well under way with several ships of over 100 tons having been built.

In 1862 there was a shipyard at the site of the current railway station, and another to the east at Dixon's Landing at the end of Landing Road. A public wharf was built there by local merchants in 1840–41. The shopkeepers were looking to import products and export staples such as lumber, grindstones and building stones. In the 1870s, a spur line connecting the Intercolonial Railway to the wharf was built.

Shipbuilding and coastal trading thrived between 1824 and 1872. The last was built in 1896. The largest was the Sarah Dixon, built by Charles Dixon in 1856 at 1465 tons. That same year, Christopher Boultenhouse launched the 192 ton steamship The Westmorland, which carried passengers, mail and freight between Shediac, Summerside, Charlottetown, and Pictou from 1857 to 1863 for the governments of New Brunswick, Nova Scotia and Prince Edward Island.

By the 1870s the wharf was inadequate since vessels over 200 tons had only the end berth. A new wharf was added in 1911, but much shipping business had already been lost because of the lack of proper wharf. Local folklore reports that a ship never tied up at the new wharf. The wharf and the end of Landing Road was on a meander of the Tantramar River, but in the 1920s the meander was cut off due to erosion and silting, leaving the site without access to the sea.

=== The railway era ===
In 1872 the Intercolonial Railway project changed the Sackville area forever. This line was to follow the shortest route between Truro and Moncton, but political interference by Edward Barron Chandler and other politicians in nearby Dorchester saw the route for the railway altered to run through their community. It had been intended that the original route for the line would run north across the Tantramar Marshes from Fort Beauséjour to what is currently Middle Sackville and then on through the lowlands to Scoudouc and Moncton. The Dorchester diversion had the railway skirt the western edge of the marsh to the area near the public wharf and shipyards on the lower Tantramar River before continuing on to Frosty Hollow, Dorchester and the Memramcook Valley.

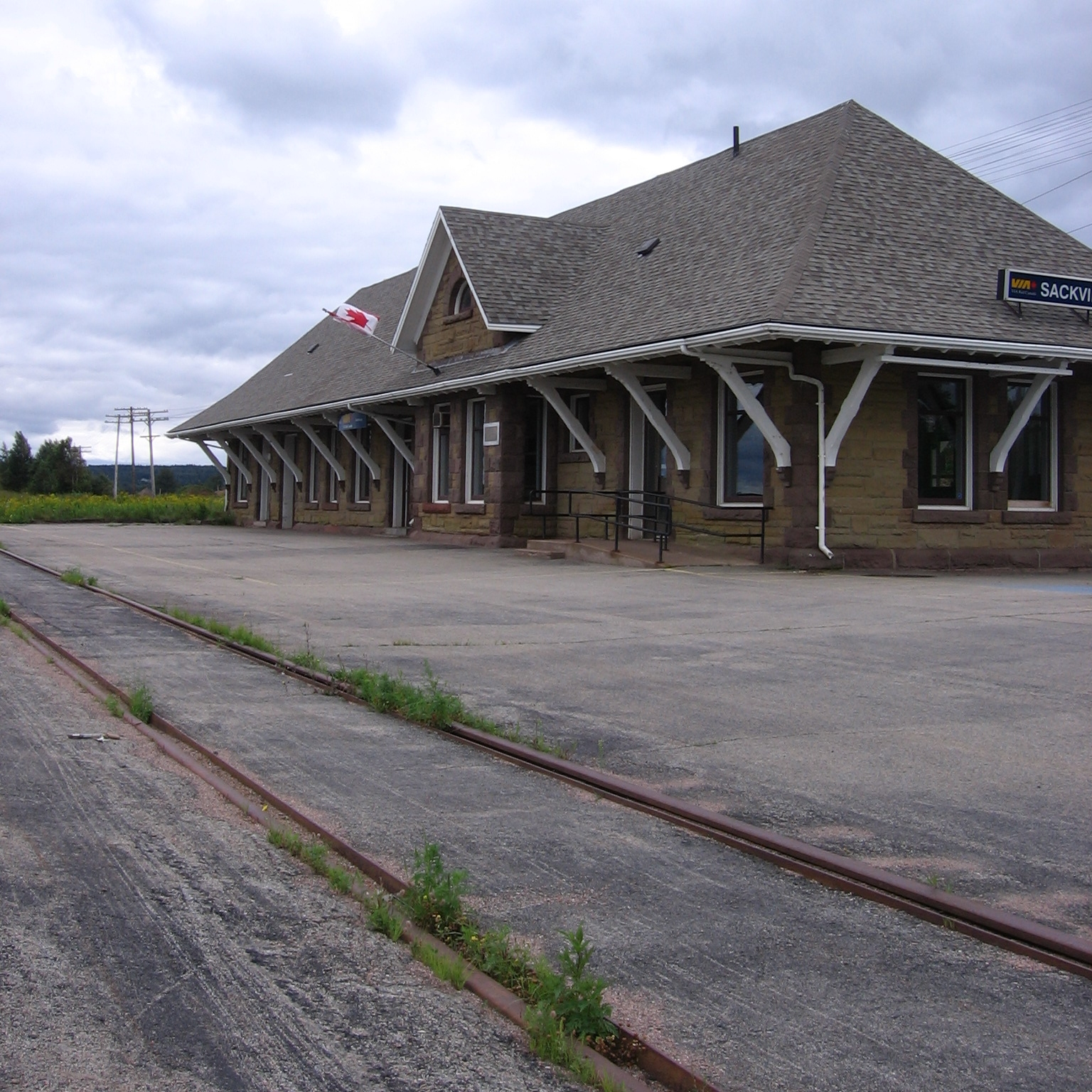
The Sackville railway station was completed in 1907

The new location of the Intercolonial Railway resulted in the commercial and business centre of Sackville being relocated from the mill district at Silver Lake to the current town centre, closer to the railway line. The New Brunswick and Prince Edward Island Railway was constructed a decade later to connect Cape Tormentine, the closest point of mainland North America to Prince Edward Island, with the Intercolonial's main line. Sackville had been vying with nearby Amherst to be the junction point for the line to Cape Tormentine; local shipbuilder and industrialist entrepreneur Josiah Wood ensured that Sackville was chosen as the junction.

The National Policy of Prime Minister Sir John A. Macdonald's administration in the 1870s-1880s saw various industries cluster along the Intercolonial Railway in Amherst and Sackville. Sackville became home to two independent foundries; the Enterprise Foundry, and the Fawcett Foundry. Both produced stoves and related products with both businesses operating for more than a century. These competitors eventually merged and the Fawcett Foundry was closed and the foundry demolished in the 1980s; this brownfield site at the corner of Main and King streets was purchased by Mount Allison University for campus expansion. The remaining Enterprise-Fawcett Foundry was still operational and employed roughly 60 people near the railway station. It was one of the few remaining stove foundries in the world until it suffered a fire in January 2012. As of 2018 the foundry still had not been rebuilt.

Sackville grew in importance as a railway junction after Canadian National Railways established a dedicated railcar ferry service at Cape Tormentine in 1917. The Sackville railway yard and station were constantly busy until the opening of publicly funded highways following World War II started a slow decline. The abandonment of the Prince Edward Island Railway in 1989 saw the line to Cape Tormentine removed at the same time as the Trans-Canada Highway was being expanded to a 4-lane freeway. As the railway consolidated to a single mainline running through town, businesses left, including offices of Atlantic Wholesalers.

=== Recent history ===
On 1 January 2023, Sackville amalgamated with the village of Dorchester and parts of three local service districts to form the new town of Tantramar. The community's name remains in official use.

In November 2022, Sackville received the accreditation of being named an international wetland city under the Ramsar Convention, the first in North America.

== Geography ==
Sackville is on the Isthmus of Chignecto, which connects the Nova Scotia peninsula with North America. It is on the Tantramar River, which empties into Cumberland Basin which then joins Chignecto Bay, a sub-basin of the Bay of Fundy. Sackville is at a low elevation above sea level. Prominent ridges rise above the marshes, namely the Fort Lawrence Ridge, the Aulac Ridge, the Sackville Ridge, and the Memramcook Ridge. Sackville is surrounded by the Tantramar Marshes, once a tidal saltmarsh. The marshes are an important stopover for migrating birds. The marsh soil consists of silts deposited by centuries of tidal flooding. Drainage is poor and there are slow-moving meandering rivers, shallow lakes, bogs, and intertidal zones.

== Infrastructure ==
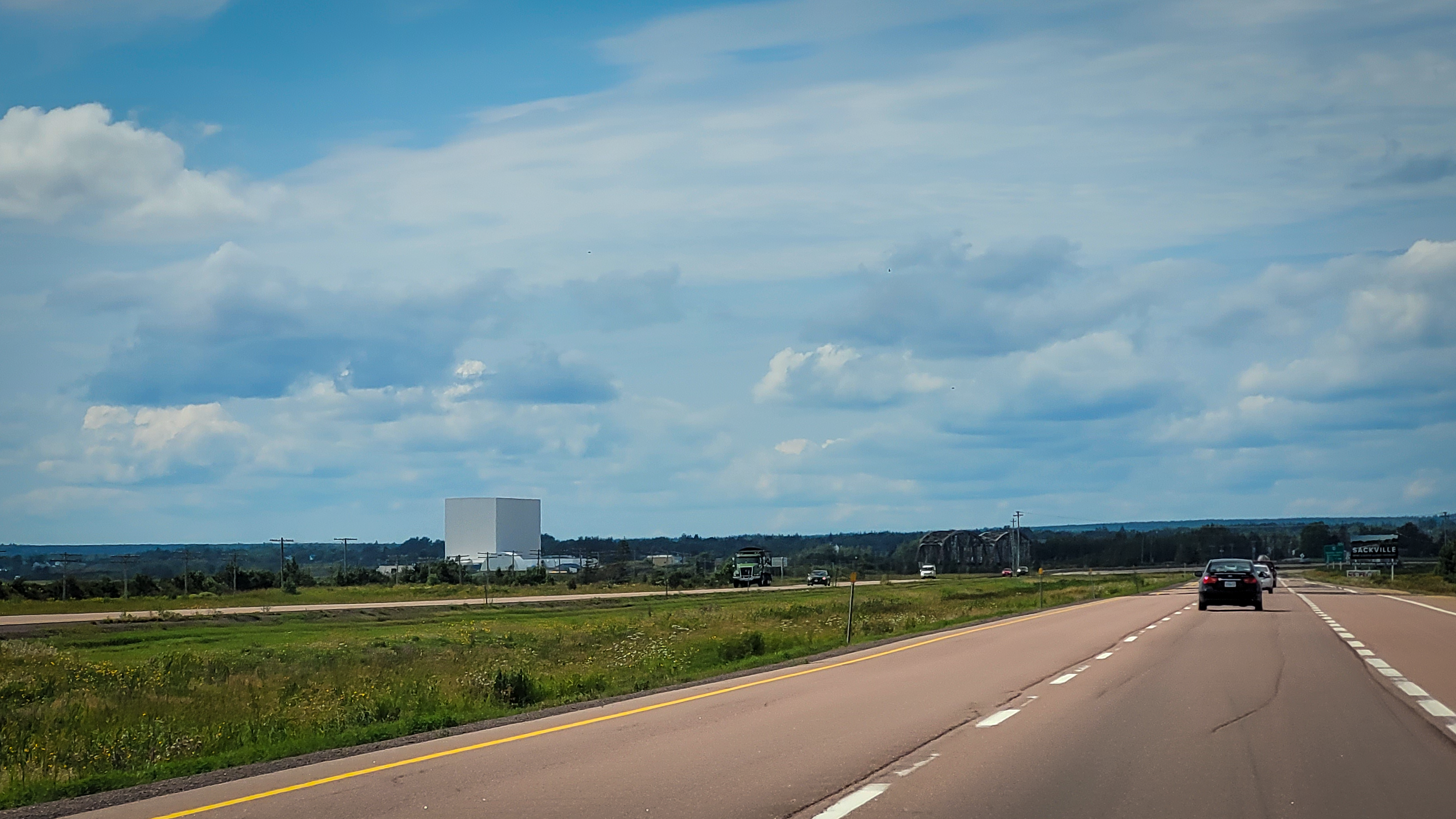
Sackville on the Tantramar Marshes

The earliest post road followed the route of the present day High Marsh Road. The Trans-Canada Highway (as it is now known) ran straight through the town until a bypass was built in 1962. The provincial border at the Missaguash River bridge is the dividing line between Nova Scotia Highway 104-Nova Scotia Trunk 2 and New Brunswick Highway 2. This highway forms one of the two main surface transportation links between the two provinces. The Mount Whatley Road runs between Mt. Whatley, New Brunswick and Fort Lawrence, Nova Scotia. CN Rail's mainline between Halifax and Montreal runs through Sackville, parallel to the Trans-Canada Highway. The Sackville railway station, still in active use with Via Rail, is designated a national historic place.

The Sackville Memorial Hospital serves the region, as well as the Community Health Centre which houses several physicians, an optometrist, a dentist, and a pharmacy. It is one of the few that are not government-run.

The Tantramar Veterans Memorial Civic Centre, a recreational facility and arena, opened in 2003. The arena can seat over 750 spectators and is the home rink for the Mount Allison University women's hockey team.

== Demographics ==
In the 2021 Census of Population conducted by Statistics Canada, Sackville had a population of 6,099 living in 2,689 of its 3,047 total private dwellings, a change of 14.4% from its 2016 population of 5,331. With a land area of 73.91 km^{2} (28.54 sq mi), it had a population density of 82.5/km^{2} (213.7/sq mi) in 2021.

Historical population
Year	Pop.	±%
1901	1,444	—
1911	2,309	+59.9%
1921	2,173	−5.9%
1931	2,234	+2.8%
1941	2,489	+11.4%
1951	2,873	+15.4%
1961	4,612	+60.5%
1981	5,635	+22.2%
1986	5,470	−2.9%
1991	5,494	+0.4%
1996	5,393	−1.8%
2001	5,361	−0.6%
2006	5,411	+0.9%
2011	5,558	+2.7%
2016	5,331	−4.1%
2021	6,099	+14.4%

As of the 2016 Canada Census, the median age was 47.9. Mother tongue was reported as English by 4,980 people, and French by 180.

== Economy ==
The main employers are a Moneris Solutions call centre, Russel Metals, Sackville Memorial Hospital, and Mount Allison University.

== Arts and culture ==
- The oldest university art gallery in Canada, the Owens Art Gallery, which opened in 1895, has a permanent collection of over 4000 works. The current director of the Owens Art Gallery is Dr. Emily Falvey.
- Live Bait Theatre provides theatre and other live performances like dinner theatre, comedy and live music.
- In 2008 the town was given a Government of Canada grant the 300th anniversary of its founding and to mark the 10th anniversary of the opening of its first museum.
- The Sackville Arts Wall celebrates the achievements of Sackville artists who have made significant contributions to the fields of Literary Arts, Performing Arts, and Visual Arts, as well as Arts Builders who have supported artistic development within the community. Sackville Arts Wall inductees include Alex Colville, Charles G. D. Roberts, Pauline Spatz, Ray Legere, Arthur John Motyer, Douglas Lochhead, Ivan and Vivian Hicks, Sharon MacIntyre, Glenn Adams, K. V. Johansen, Pauline Harborne, Alex Fancy, Ian Hanomansing, Julie Doiron, Mary Connelly, Thaddeus Holownia, Ernie Sears, Delanor R. Wheaton, and Janet Hammock.
- Struts Gallery, is an artist-run-centre established in 1980 dedicated to presenting contemporary art to the public through artist residencies, screenings, and performances.
- SappyFest is an annual independent arts and music festival held in Sackville, New Brunswick, Canada, launched in 2006. SappyFest was started by Paul Henderson, Jon Claytor, and musician Julie Doiron as an extension of Sappy Records.

== Landmarks ==
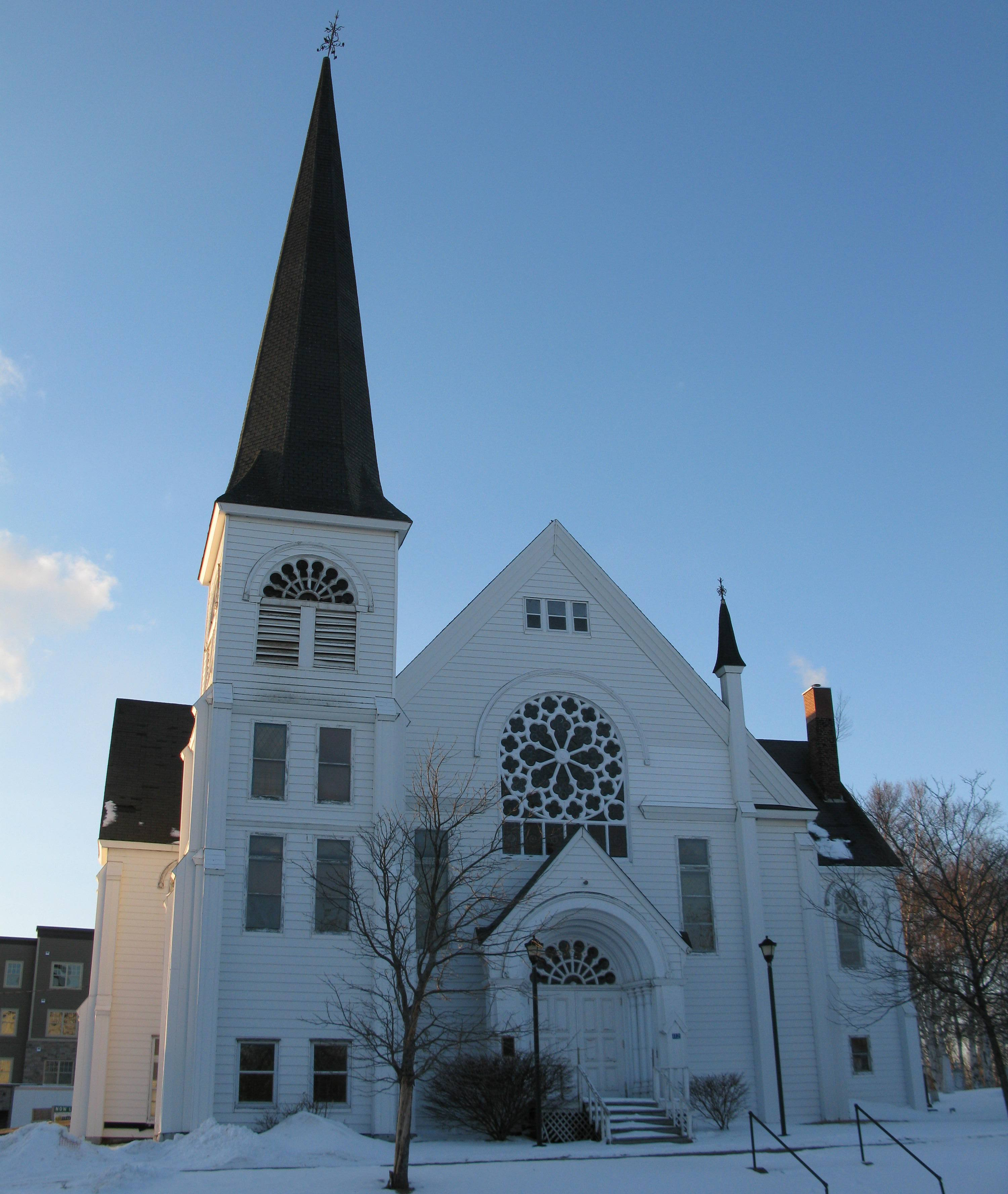
- Sackville United Church, Sackville, New Brunswick, 2014. Demolished 2015.
  A 50m-long covered bridge, built in 1916, which spans the Tantramar River on the High Marsh Road.
- Cranewood: a Georgian house constructed of local red sandstone in about 1836 by William Crane. It was bought by Josiah Wood in 1867, and remained in the Wood family until 1966. From 1966 to 1975 the house belonged to Dr. W.S.H. Crawford, until it was purchased by Mount Allison University for use as the official residence of the president. In 2013 the Cranewood building was converted into a bakery.
- The Swan Pond, also known as Lily Pond, is located in Ladies' College Park on the campus of Mount Allison University. The pond was excavated in 1901 and a fountain designed by artist John Hammond was added in 1904. The last pair of swans to live in the Swan Pond died in 2015.
- Campbell Carriage Factory: Sackville's first museum, the Carriage Factory was operated by the Campbell family for over 100 years, closing its doors in the 1950s.
- Captain George Anderson House, an octagon house built in 1855.
- The Boultenhouse Heritage Centre, built by prolific shipbuilder Christopher Boultenhouse in 1840, built onto the front of the Bulmer House, which is believed to be Sackville's oldest house built in 1790. It houses wallpaper that is original to the house, imported from Paris, and believed to be one of only 3 or 4 examples of this type of wallpaper remaining intact in North America.
- The Sackville Harness Shop was founded in 1919 and made custom hand-crafted leather items, specializing in harnesses and straw collars for draught horses. The building, an example of Gothic Revival architecture, was constructed c. 1846 and is one of the Town's earliest commercial properties. The business closed in 2021.
- The Vogue Cinema: an Art Deco style building established in 1946, which operated until May 2023. It is a one-room theatre originally designed by Moncton architect R.A Frechet. The Vogue Cinema held regular movie screenings and hosted the Sackville Film Society yearly during the fall and winter season.
- The Cube is the tallest building in Sackville. Standing at 44 metres tall, it's a featureless white cube-shaped structure which is an enormous automated blueberry and cranberry freezer. Aside from its main use, in 2021 it was used as a public screen for video art and music videos during SappyFest.

== Education ==
Public schooling, run by Anglophone East School District, includes a pre-school, the Salem Elementary School, Marshview Middle School, and Tantramar Regional High School. Sackville is also home to Mount Allison University.

== Sackville Public Library ==
Sackville opened a public library in 1984 which has since been accessible to the entire town of Tantramar. Located on 66 Main Street, in the centre of downtown Sackville the library opens its doors to all demographics of the population. The library is a part of the system of New Brunswick Public Libraries.

== Media ==
=== Newspapers/Periodicals ===
- The Argosy is the student journal produced by students of Mount Allison University. Established in 1872, The Argosy is one of the oldest official student publications in the country.

=== Radio ===
- CBAM-FM-1/105.7 is a repeater of CBAM-FM at Moncton.
- CHMA-FM/106.9, known as "The Voice of the Marshes", provides open format and specialty music shows, spoken word programs on a variety of topics as well as audio art programming.
- From 1944 to 2014, Sackville was home to CKCX, the high-power shortwave transmitter site shared by Radio Canada International and the CBC northern shortwave service.

== Selected bibliography ==
- Hamilton, William B. (2004). At the Crossroads: A History of Sackville, New Brunswick. Kentville, N.S.: Gaspereau Press. ISBN 978-1-8940-3186-8.
- Fox, Amy & Bogaard, Paul, The Struggle for Sackville: The British Resettlement of Chignecto 1755-1770, Tantramar Heritage Trust, 2012.
