= Shediac Parish =

Shediac
- Parish
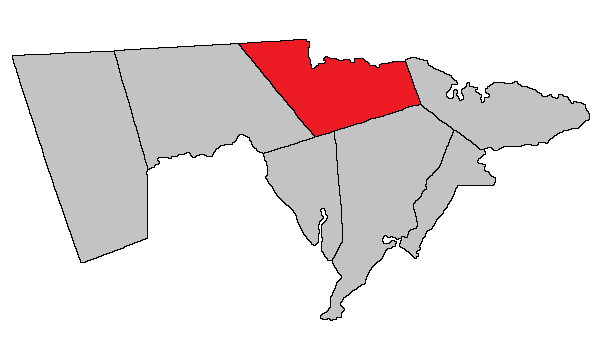
- Location within Westmorland County, New Brunswick.
- Coordinates: 46.19°N 64.60°W
- Country: Canada
- Province: New Brunswick
- County: Westmorland County
- Erected: 1827

Area
  - Land: 178.79 km^{2} (69.03 sq mi)

Population (2021)
  - Total: 5,144
  - Density: 28.8/km^{2} (75/sq mi)
  - Change 2016-2021: ▲7.4%
  - Dwellings: 2,976
- Time zone: UTC-4 (AST)
  - Summer (DST): UTC-3 (ADT)
- Figures do not include portions within the city of Dieppe, the town of Shediac, the village of Cap-Pelé, and the rural community of Beaubassin East

Shediac is a geographic parish in Westmorland County, New Brunswick, Canada. (Note: The Territorial Division Act divides the province into 152 parishes, the cities of Saint John and Fredericton, and one town of Grand Falls. The Interpretation Act clarifies that parishes include any local government within their borders.)

For governance purposes it is divided between the city of Dieppe, the towns of Cap-Acadie and Shediac, the incorporated rural communities of Beausoleil and Maple Hills, and the Southeast rural district. (Note: Maps still visible as thumbnails show the current and previous governance boundaries.) Beausoleil is a members of the Kent Regional Service Commission, with the rest all belonging to the Southeast Regional Service Commission.

Prior to the 2023 governance reform, the parish was divided between Dieppe, Shediac, the village of Cap-Pelé, the rural community of Beaubassin East, and the local service districts of Grande-Digue, Pointe-du-Chêne, Scoudouc, Scoudouc Road, Shediac Bridge-Shediac River, Shediac Cape, and the parish of Shediac. With minor boundary changes, Grande-Digue and Shediac Bridge-Shediac River are now part of Beausoleil; Pointe-du-Chêne, Scoudouc, Scoudouc Road, and Shediac Cape were annexed by Shediac; Cap-Pelé and Beaubassin East merged to form Cap-Acadie; and the Shediac Parish LSD was divided between Beausoleil and Maple Hills.

== Origin of name ==
The parish's name comes the community of Shediac, itself from a corruption of Mi'kmaq Es-ed-ei'-ik, translated by Rand as "running far back." There was a Fort Shediac mentioned in documents around 1755, on the mainland opposite Shediac Island.

== History ==
Shediac was erected in 1827 from Dorchester and Sackville Parishes. The eastern boundary was at the mouth of the Kouchibouguac River.

In 1850 the eastern boundary was moved to run through Cap-Pelé.

In 1894 the existing boundaries were declared retroactive to the parish's erection.

In 1904 the boundary with Botsford Parish was clarified.

== Boundaries ==
Shediac Parish is bounded:

- on the north by the Kent County line and Northumberland Strait;
- on the east by a line beginning about 375 metres east of the mouth of the Tedish River and running south 4º 30' west (Note: By the magnet of 1903, when declination in the area was between 22º and 23º west of north. The Territorial Division Act clause referring to magnetic direction bearings was omitted in the 1952 and 1973 Revised Statutes.) to a point about 1.6 kilometres northwesterly of the junction of Chemin des Moulins and Route 940 and about 450 metres from Square Lake;
- on the south by the prolongation of a line running south 83º 45' east (Note: By the magnet of 1894, when declination in the area was between 21º and 22º west of north.) from the southern side of the mouth of Fox Creek;
- on the west by a line beginning about 1.3 kilometres east of the Memramcook River, at the prolongation of the southwestern line of a grant to Columb Connor on Route 134, then running northwesterly along the prolongation, the Connor grant, and its northwesterly prolongation to the Kent County line.

== Communities ==
Communities at least partly within the parish. bold indicates an incorporated municipality or rural community; italics indicate a name no longer in official use

- Batemans Mills
- **Cap-Pelé**
  - Dupuis Corner
- Dieppe
- Evangeline
- Gilberts Corner
- MacDougall
- Malakoff
- Moncton Road
- Pointe-du-Chêne
- Saint-Philippe
- Scoudouc (Dorchester Crossing)
- **Shediac**
  - Chapman Corner
  - East Shediac
  - Ohio-du-Barachois
  - Rings Corner
- Shediac Bridge
- Shediac River
- Shediac Cape
- The Bluff
- **Beaubassin East**
  - Barachois
  - Basse-Aboujagane
  - Boudreau
  - Bourgeois Mills
  - Cap-Brûlé
  - Cormier-Village
  - Drisdelle
  - Gallant Settlement
  - Glaude
  - Haute-Aboujagane
  - LeBlanc
  - Robichaud
  - Saint-André-de-Shédiac

== Bodies of water ==
Bodies of water (Note: Not including brooks, ponds or coves.) at least partly within the parish.

- Aboujagane River
- Kinnear River
- Kouchibouguac River
- Scoudouc River
- Shediac River
- Tedish River
- Bear Creek
- Mill Creek
- Shediac Bay
- Shediac Harbour
- Lac des Boudreau
- Poucette Lake
- Petit Barachois

== Islands ==
Islands at least partly within the parish.

- Shediac Island
- Skull Island

== Other notable places ==
Parks, historic sites, and other noteworthy places at least partly within the parish.

- Cormier Aerodrome
- Parlee Beach Provincial Park
- Scoudouc Industrial Park
- Shediac Bridge Aerodrome

== Demographics ==
Parish population total does not include the town of Shediac and portions within Dieppe, Cap-Pelé, and Beaubassin East

=== Population ===
Historical population
Year	Pop.	±%
1991	4,658	—
1996	4,104	−11.9%
2001	4,292	+4.6%
2006	4,801	+11.9%
2011	4,917	+2.4%
2016	4,789	−2.6%

=== Language ===
Mother tongue (2016)

Language	Population	Pct (%)
French only	2,630	54.9%
English only	1,995	41.6%
Both English and French	90	1.9%
Other languages	75	1.6%

== Access routes ==
Highways and numbered routes that run through the parish, including external routes that start or finish at the parish limits:

- **Highways**
  - Route 11
  - Route 15
- **Principal Routes**
  - Route 132
  - Route 133
  - Route 134
- Secondary Routes:
  - None
- External Routes:
  - None

== See also ==
- List of parishes in New Brunswick
- Greater Shediac
