= Greater Shediac =

Coordinates: 46°13′N 64°32′W

Greater Shediac is the name given to the area encompassing the Town of Shediac in New Brunswick, Canada and its surroundings. Most of this area is a tourist area along the Northumberland Strait mainly on portions of Route 134, Route 133 and Route 950. Some of the areas mentioned below are included in the area of Greater Moncton.

== List of towns, communities and cities ==
- Shediac
- Pointe-du-Chêne
- Grand-Barachois
- Scoudouc
- Shemogue
- Cormier Village
- Haute Aboujagane
- Cap-Pelé
- Shediac Bridge-Shediac River
- Grande-Digue
- Caissie Cape
- Cocagne

== See also ==
- List of events in Greater Moncton
- Greater Moncton
- Shediac Parish
- Shediac Bay
- Scoudouc River
- Shediac River
- Shediac Island
- Parlee Beach, New Brunswick

== Neighbouring areas ==
- Greater Moncton
- Tantramar Region
