= List of historic places in Westmorland County, New Brunswick =

This article is a list of historic places in Westmorland County, New Brunswick entered on the Canadian Register of Historic Places, whether they are federal, provincial, or municipal. For listings in Moncton, see List of historic places in Moncton, New Brunswick.

== List of historic places outside Moncton ==
| Name | Address | Coordinates | Government recognition (CRHP №) | Wikidata ID | Image |
|---|---|---|---|---|---|
| Cape Jourimain Lighthouse | Cape Jourimain Nature Center; Botsford NB | 46°09′27″N 63°48′23″W | Federal (20717, (4742) | | More images |
| Joseph F. Allison House | 131 Main Street; Sackville NB | 45°53′57″N 64°22′06″W | Sackville municipality (5464) | | Upload Photo |
| Anchorage | 78 York Street; Sackville NB | 45°53′56″N 64°22′34″W | Sackville municipality (5447) | | Upload Photo |
| Captain George Anderson House | 6 King Street; Sackville NB | 45°54′03″N 64°22′31″W | Sackville municipality (6844) | | Upload Photo |
| Angel of Cap-Pelé Monument | 2648 Acadie Road; Cap-Pele NB | 46°12′55″N 64°16′14″W | Cap-Pele municipality (6552) | | Upload Photo |
| Anglican Church Rectory | 143 Main Street; Sackville NB | 45°54′02″N 64°22′17″W | Sackville municipality (6923) | | Upload Photo |
| Archbishop’s Residence | 452 Amirault Street; Dieppe NB | 46°04′51″N 64°43′48″W | Dieppe municipality (12668) | | Upload Photo |
| Justine Arsenault Building | 2657 Acadie Road; Cap-Pele NB | 46°12′54″N 64°16′12″W | Cap-Pele municipality (6840) | | Upload Photo |
| Association des Pêcheurs de Bas-Cap-Pelé Lobster Plant | 52 Niles Street; Cap-Pele NB | 46°14′01″N 64°15′44″W | Cap-Pele municipality (6838) | | Upload Photo |
| Assumption Hall | A-2659 Acadie Road; Cap-Pele NB | 46°12′54″N 64°16′11″W | Cap-Pele municipality (6554) | | Upload Photo |
| L'Auberge Gabrièle Inn | 296 Main Street; Shediac NB | 46°13′10″N 64°32′54″W | Shediac municipality (4396) | | Upload Photo |
| BA Service Station | 2167 Amirault Street; Dieppe NB | 46°03′14″N 64°40′57″W | Dieppe municipality (6474) | | Upload Photo |
| Léonard Barrieau Farm | 783 Chartersville Road; Dieppe NB | 46°05′52″N 64°41′45″W | Dieppe municipality (12686) | | Upload Photo |
| Beaumont Quarry | Beaumont Road; Memramcook NB | 45°52′25″N 64°34′14″W | Memramcook municipality (14263) | | Upload Photo |
| Beck House | 2622 River Road; Salisbury NB | 46°01′25″N 65°02′10″W | Salisbury municipality (16981) | | Upload Photo |
| Bell Inn | 3515 Cape Road; Dorchester NB | 45°53′56″N 64°31′00″W | New Brunswick (5749) | | |
| Belliveau Orchards | 1209 Principale Street; Memramcook NB | 45°56′58″N 64°37′33″W | Memramcook municipality (7631) | | Upload Photo |
| Belliveau Village Wharf | Belliveau Wharf Road; Memramcook NB | 45°56′14″N 64°37′10″W | Memramcook municipality (7755) | | |
| Birthplace of Roméo LeBlanc | 1071 Centrale Street; Memramcook NB | 45°56′58″N 64°33′46″W | Memramcook municipality (6789) | | Upload Photo |
| Black House | 82 York Street; Sackville NB | 45°53′58″N 64°22′36″W | Federal (7421), Sackville municipality (5445) | | Upload Photo |
| Conrad Blanchette House | 955 Amirault Street; Dieppe NB | 46°04′16″N 64°43′20″W | Dieppe municipality (12843) | | Upload Photo |
| Boultenhouse Heritage Centre | 29 Queens Road; Sackville NB | 45°53′28″N 64°22′14″W | Sackville municipality (5306) | | |
| Bourque Hotel | 123 Robichaud Street; Cap-Pele NB | 46°13′05″N 64°15′50″W | Cap-Pele municipality (8358) | | Upload Photo |
| Aimé Bourque House | 2673 Acadie Road; Cap-Pele NB | 46°12′52″N 64°16′05″W | Cap-Pele municipality (6553) | | Upload Photo |
| André Bourque House | 441 Acadie Avenue; Dieppe NB | 46°05′46″N 64°45′08″W | Dieppe municipality (13165) | | Upload Photo |
| Eustache Bourque Residence | 1788 Amirault Street; Dieppe NB | 46°03′44″N 64°42′14″W | Dieppe municipality (6530) | | Upload Photo |
| Philippe Bourque House | 321 Marguerite Street; Dieppe NB | 46°03′46″N 64°42′15″W | Dieppe municipality (13163) | | Upload Photo |
| Pierre Bourque House | 2352 Amirault Street; Dieppe NB | 46°03′05″N 64°40′26″W | Dieppe municipality (12629) | | Upload Photo |
| Tilmon Bourque House | 459 La Vallee Highway; Memramcook NB | 46°00′45″N 64°36′02″W | Memramcook municipality (7147) | | Upload Photo |
| Victor Beausoleil Broussard Village | Parkin Street; Salisbury NB | 46°01′43″N 65°01′41″W | Salisbury municipality (16901) | | Upload Photo |
| Pascal Brun House | 8 Doiron Street; Cap-Pele NB | 46°12′50″N 64°17′39″W | Cap-Pele municipality (6839) | | Upload Photo |
| Placide Brun House | 11133 Bas-Cap-Pele Road; Cap-Pele NB | 46°13′41″N 64°14′42″W | Cap-Pele municipality (6812) | | Upload Photo |
| Gilbert Buote House | 2289 Acadie Road; Cap-Pele NB | 46°13′12″N 64°18′57″W | Cap-Pele municipality (8279) | | Upload Photo |
| Butte à Pétard | 540 Centrale Street; Memramcook NB | 45°58′37″N 64°33′57″W | Memramcook municipality (6822) | | Upload Photo |
| Campbell Carriage Factory | 19 Church Street; Sackville NB | 45°55′36″N 64°21′07″W | New Brunswick (2254), Sackville municipality (5369) | | Upload Photo |
| Ronald Campbell House | 17 Church Street; Sackville NB | 45°55′35″N 64°21′12″W | Sackville municipality (6957) | | Upload Photo |
| Canadian National Railways (Intercolonial Railway) Station | south end of Lorne Street; Sackville NB | 45°53′24″N 64°22′05″W | Federal (4592) | | |
| Captain Landry House | 420 Main Street; Shediac NB | 46°13′13″N 64°32′09″W | Shediac municipality (4879) | | Upload Photo |
| Chandler House / Rocklyn National Historic Site of Canada | Main Street; Dorchester NB | 45°53′56″N 64°30′56″W | Federal (12982) | | Upload Photo |
| Charles Upham Chandler House | 5016 Main Street; Dorchester NB | 45°53′51″N 64°30′50″W | Dorchester municipality (17462) | | Upload Photo |
| George Wentworth Chandler House | 5012 Main Street; Dorchester NB | 45°53′51″N 64°30′52″W | Dorchester municipality (17463) | | Upload Photo |
| Samuel Charters House | 167 Chartersville Road; Dieppe NB | 46°05′12″N 64°43′32″W | Dieppe municipality (8386) | | Upload Photo |
| Colville House | 76 York Street; Sackville NB | 45°53′57″N 64°22′32″W | Sackville municipality (6907) | | |
| Congregation Tiferes Israel Cemetery | Sellick Street; Dieppe NB | 46°04′49″N 64°43′59″W | Dieppe municipality (6479) | | Upload Photo |
| Edna Cormier Building | 348 Main Street; Shediac NB | 46°13′11″N 64°32′36″W | Shediac municipality (9855) | | Upload Photo |
| Cranewood | 113 Main Street; Sackville NB | 45°53′53″N 64°22′04″W | Sackville municipality (4134) | | Upload Photo |
| Croix de la Montain | 488 Centrale Street; Memramcook NB | 45°59′34″N 64°34′28″W | Memramcook municipality (7125) | | Upload Photo |
| Cross and 1755 Bicentennial Grotto | Intersection of Amirault Street and Dover Road; Dieppe NB | 46°03′14″N 64°40′51″W | Dieppe municipality (6521) | | Upload Photo |
| Darois-Breau Founders' Site | Paul Street (extension); Dieppe NB | 46°05′46″N 64°45′30″W | Dieppe municipality (6513) | | Upload Photo |
| Deacon-Surette Pharmacy | 334 Main Street; Shediac NB | 46°13′10″N 64°32′41″W | Shediac municipality (7217) | | Upload Photo |
| Depot Railway Hotel | 87 Horsman Street; Salisbury NB | 46°01′54″N 65°02′32″W | Salisbury municipality (16954) | | Upload Photo |
| Dixon House | 56 Crescent Street; Sackville NB | 45°53′24″N 64°21′40″W | Sackville municipality (7173) | | Upload Photo |
| Doiron Store | 366 Main Street; Shediac NB | 46°13′11″N 64°32′32″W | Shediac municipality (6139) | | Upload Photo |
| Joseph Doiron House | 1150 Amirault Street; Dieppe NB | 46°04′05″N 64°43′09″W | Dieppe municipality (8322) | | Upload Photo |
| Dorchester Penitentiary, Administrative Building | Dorchester NB | 45°54′42″N 64°30′40″W | Federal (9844) | | |
| Dorchester Penitentiary, Towers D-1, D-2, D-3, D-4 | Dorchester NB | 45°54′43″N 64°30′39″W | Federal (4816) | | Upload Photo |
| Dover Road School | 341 Dover Road; Dieppe NB | 46°03′07″N 64°40′57″W | Dieppe municipality (12604) | | Upload Photo |
| Hotel Duguay/LeBlanc | 2631 Acadie Road; Cap-Pele NB | 46°12′55″N 64°16′24″W | Cap-Pele municipality (6845) | | Upload Photo |
| Ambroise Dupuis House | 2244 Acadie Road; Cap-Pele NB | 46°13′17″N 64°19′19″W | Cap-Pele municipality (7966) | | Upload Photo |
| Albert Allison Dysart Residence | 310 Main Street; Shediac NB | 46°13′10″N 64°32′50″W | Shediac municipality (5521) | | Upload Photo |
| Easterbrooks House | 12 Folkins Drive; Sackville NB | 45°55′29″N 64°21′06″W | Sackville municipality (6902) | | Upload Photo |
| Captain Thomas Egan House | 31 Queens Road; Sackville NB | 45°53′28″N 64°22′18″W | Sackville municipality (7151) | | Upload Photo |
| Enterprise Foundry | 73 Lorne Street; Sackville NB | 45°53′18″N 64°22′09″W | Sackville municipality (7181) | | Upload Photo |
| Captain Wilson Estabrooks House | 44 Queens Road; Sackville NB | 45°53′27″N 64°22′21″W | Sackville municipality (6948) | | Upload Photo |
| Elsliger House | 348 Harold Street; Dieppe NB | 46°05′36″N 64°45′01″W | Dieppe municipality (8787) | | Upload Photo |
| William Fawcett House | 129 Pondshore Road; Sackville NB | 45°56′20″N 64°20′56″W | Sackville municipality (5268) | | Upload Photo |
| First Chapel Site | Chapelle Street; Dieppe NB | 46°04′27″N 64°43′47″W | Dieppe municipality (8264) | | Upload Photo |
| Donald Shives Fisher House | 1 Rectory Lane; Sackville NB | 45°54′01″N 64°22′15″W | Sackville municipality (7150) | | Upload Photo |
| Dr. Alexander Fleming House | 77 York Street; Sackville NB | 45°53′59″N 64°22′33″W | Sackville municipality (6882) | | Upload Photo |
| Delbert Forbes House | 478 Acadie Avenue; Dieppe NB | 46°05′48″N 64°45′12″W | Dieppe municipality (12687) | | Upload Photo |
| George E. Ford Block | 96-102 Main Street; Sackville NB | 45°53′53″N 64°22′11″W | Sackville municipality (5403) | | Upload Photo |
| Former Brunswick Downs Site | 500 Gauvin Road; Dieppe NB | 46°05′47″N 64°44′02″W | Dieppe municipality (8672) | | Upload Photo |
| Former Gayton School | Gayton Road; Memramcook NB | 46°01′34″N 64°33′51″W | Memramcook municipality (6794) | | Upload Photo |
| Former Mi'kmaq Reserve at Beaumont | 643 Beaumont Road; Memramcook NB | 45°53′21″N 64°35′12″W | Memramcook municipality (5968) | | Upload Photo |
| Former Protestant Church | 392 Amirault Street; Dieppe NB | 46°04′58″N 64°43′54″W | Dieppe municipality (8695) | | Upload Photo |
| Former Saint-Joseph School | 612 Centrale Street; Memramcook NB | 45°58′27″N 64°33′57″W | Memramcook municipality (6803) | | Upload Photo |
| Former Sainte-Thérèse Church | 445 Acadie Avenue; Dieppe NB | 46°05′47″N 64°45′09″W | Dieppe municipality (9473) | | Upload Photo |
| Fort Beauséjour – Fort Cumberland National Historic Site of Canada | Aulac NB | 45°51′58″N 64°17′22″W | Federal (5446) | | |
| Fort Gaspareaux National Historic Site of Canada | Fort Street; Strait Shores NB | 46°02′34″N 64°04′16″W | Federal (7612) | | |
| Four Corners Burying Ground | 147-163 Church Street; Sackville NB | 45°56′12″N 64°20′21″W | Sackville municipality (5376) | | Upload Photo |
| Fox Creek Aboiteau | Chantal Street; Dieppe NB | 46°03′26″N 64°42′18″W | Dieppe municipality (12769) | | Upload Photo |
| Jim Friel Cottage | 740 Medley Lane; Cap-Pele NB | 46°14′05″N 64°16′07″W | Cap-Pele municipality (8990) | | Upload Photo |
| Hugh Gallagher House | 80 Queens Road; Sackville NB | 45°53′24″N 64°22′38″W | Sackville municipality (6932) | | Upload Photo |
| Anselme Gaudet Workshop and Store | 970 Amirault Street; Dieppe NB | 46°04′16″N 64°43′18″W | Dieppe municipality (9542) | | Upload Photo |
| Gilbert Gaudet House | 442 Dover Road; Dieppe NB | 46°02′50″N 64°41′04″W | Dieppe municipality (13086) | | Upload Photo |
| Sylvain Gaudet House | 172 La Vallee Highway; Memramcook NB | 45°59′58″N 64°34′26″W | Memramcook municipality (6793) | | Upload Photo |
| Gauvin House | 455 Gauvin Road; Dieppe NB | 46°05′48″N 64°44′10″W | Dieppe municipality (6498) | | Upload Photo |
| Henri Gauvin House | 405 Dover Road; Dieppe NB | 46°02′56″N 64°41′02″W | Dieppe municipality (12627) | | Upload Photo |
| Gayton Covered Bridge | Gayton Road; Memramcook NB | 46°01′36″N 64°33′50″W | Memramcook municipality (14282) | | Upload Photo |
| Greenwood Cemetery | Greenwood Drive; Shediac NB | 46°13′37″N 64°31′01″W | Shediac municipality (4911) | | Upload Photo |
| Guard Row House # 6 | 4847 Main Street; Dorchester NB | 45°54′42″N 64°30′56″W | Dorchester municipality (17565) | | Upload Photo |
| Captain Peter Hanson House | 57 Bridge Street; Sackville NB | 45°53′48″N 64°21′49″W | Sackville municipality (6846) | | Upload Photo |
| Harshman Boarding House | 634 Bas-Cap-Pele Road; Cap-Pele NB | 46°13′56″N 64°16′28″W | Cap-Pele municipality (6586) | | Upload Photo |
| Ben Harshman House | 78 Vienneau Street; Cap-Pele NB | 46°12′51″N 64°17′56″W | Cap-Pele municipality (8090) | | Upload Photo |
| Joseph Hickman House | 5032 Main Street; Dorchester NB | 45°53′47″N 64°30′48″W | Dorchester municipality (17564) | | Upload Photo |
| Rose Horsman Building | 2699 Fredericton Road; Salisbury NB | 46°01′48″N 65°02′20″W | Salisbury municipality (16942) | | Upload Photo |
| John Johnson House | 7 Main Street; Sackville NB | 45°53′31″N 64°22′17″W | Sackville municipality (6857) | | Upload Photo |
| Keillor House | 4974 Main Street; Dorchester NB | 45°54′04″N 64°30′57″W | New Brunswick (2353) | | Upload Photo |
| Freeman Kimball House | 1090 Bas-Cap-Pele Road; Cap-Pele NB | 46°13′48″N 64°14′50″W | Cap-Pele municipality (8102) | | Upload Photo |
| Ladies' College Park | 155 Main Street; Sackville NB | 45°53′57″N 64°22′11″W | Sackville municipality (5484) | | Upload Photo |
| Lakeburn Catholic Church | 1542 Champlain Street; Dieppe NB | 46°06′10″N 64°40′54″W | Dieppe municipality (8458) | | Upload Photo |
| Lakeburn Lumber Mill | 2158 Champlain Street; Dieppe NB | 46°06′10″N 64°39′06″W | Dieppe municipality (9474) | | Upload Photo |
| Joseph Lamb House | 72 Church Street; Sackville NB | 45°55′49″N 64°20′54″W | Sackville municipality (6899) | | Upload Photo |
| Julien Landry House | 2346 Acadie Road; Cap-Pele NB | 46°13′16″N 64°18′31″W | Cap-Pele municipality (6587) | | Upload Photo |
| Sir Pierre-Amand Landry House | 3497 Cape Road; Dorchester NB | 45°53′51″N 64°31′05″W | Dorchester municipality (17442) | | Upload Photo |
| LeBlanc Marsh | Amirault Street; Dieppe NB | 46°05′05″N 64°44′24″W | Dieppe municipality (6512) | | Upload Photo |
| LeBlanc/Bourque Mills | Du Moulin Street; Dieppe NB | 46°04′29″N 64°42′14″W | Dieppe municipality (12841) | | Upload Photo |
| Alfred LeBlanc Barn | 1923 Amirault Street; Dieppe NB | 46°03′35″N 64°42′01″W | Dieppe municipality (8321) | | Upload Photo |
| Alphée LeBlanc House | 421 Acadie Avenue; Dieppe NB | 46°05′45″N 64°45′04″W | Dieppe municipality (12842) | | Upload Photo |
| Alphonse LeBlanc House | 91 Olivier Street; Dieppe NB | 46°05′44″N 64°45′12″W | Dieppe municipality (12525) | | Upload Photo |
| Alvina LeBlanc Residence | 454 Dover Road; Dieppe NB | 46°02′48″N 64°41′06″W | Dieppe municipality (13167) | | Upload Photo |
| Docithée LeBlanc House | 1291, Amirault Street; Dieppe NB | 46°03′57″N 64°43′06″W | Dieppe municipality (12606) | | Upload Photo |
| Dominique LeBlanc House | 1302 Amirault Street; Dieppe NB | 46°03′58″N 64°43′04″W | Dieppe municipality (6549) | | Upload Photo |
| Two Ferdinand LeBlancs' House | 1892 Champlain Street; Dieppe NB | 46°06′14″N 64°39′53″W | Dieppe municipality (13181) | | Upload Photo |
| Frédéric LeBlanc House | 100 Champlain Street; Dieppe NB | 46°05′40″N 64°45′12″W | Dieppe municipality (12685) | | Upload Photo |
| Honoré LeBlanc Residence | 429 Acadie Avenue; Dieppe NB | 46°05′45″N 64°45′05″W | Dieppe municipality (12853) | | Upload Photo |
| Joseph LeBlanc House | 1230 Amirault Street; Dieppe NB | 46°04′03″N 64°43′08″W | Dieppe municipality (6548) | | Upload Photo |
| Joseph 'à Marcel' LeBlanc House | 30 Keith Road; Dieppe NB | 46°05′29″N 64°42′11″W | Dieppe municipality (13184) | | Upload Photo |
| Jean 'Jornot' LeBlanc House | 603 Dover Road; Dieppe NB | 46°02′19″N 64°41′27″W | Dieppe municipality (13182) | | Upload Photo |
| Marcel LeBlanc House | 69 Vienneau Street; Cap-Pele NB | 46°12′50″N 64°17′53″W | Cap-Pele municipality (6558) | | Upload Photo |
| Michel LeBlanc House | 1721 Amirault Street; Dieppe NB | 46°03′46″N 64°42′29″W | Dieppe municipality (13392) | | Upload Photo |
| Nastome LeBlanc House | 25 Sylvie Lane; Dieppe NB | 46°03′19″N 64°40′51″W | Dieppe municipality (13140) | | Upload Photo |
| Sam LeBlanc Barn | 2574 Acadie Road; Cap-Pele NB | 46°13′02″N 64°16′52″W | Cap-Pele municipality (6556) | | Upload Photo |
| Léger House | 417-419 Acadie Avenue; Dieppe NB | 46°05′44″N 64°45′04″W | Dieppe municipality (6710) | | Upload Photo |
| Léger Pharmacie | 368 Main Street; Shediac NB | 46°13′11″N 64°32′32″W | Shediac municipality (5522) | | Upload Photo |
| Lourdes Grotto | 7 Aboujagane Road; Memramcook NB | 46°00′42″N 64°30′56″W | Memramcook municipality (5961) | | Upload Photo |
| Lower Petitcodiac River | Memramcook NB | 45°55′24″N 64°37′09″W | Memramcook municipality (15201) | | Upload Photo |
| Marshlands Inn | 55 Bridge Street; Sackville NB | 45°53′48″N 64°21′51″W | Sackville municipality (4099) | | Upload Photo |
| McNeil/Gallant Store | 355 Main Street; Shediac NB | 46°13′09″N 64°32′33″W | Shediac municipality (7235) | | Upload Photo |
| Olivier M. Melanson House | 412 Main Street; Shediac NB | 46°13′12″N 64°32′12″W | Shediac municipality (4399) | | Upload Photo |
| Mel's Tea Room | 17 Bridge Street; Sackville NB | 45°53′51″N 64°22′02″W | Sackville municipality (6917) | | Upload Photo |
| Memramcook Marsh | Highway 106; Memramcook NB | 45°59′55″N 64°34′00″W | Memramcook municipality (8047) | | |
| Methodist Burying Ground | 308 Main Street; Sackville NB | 45°55′09″N 64°21′56″W | Sackville municipality (4128) | | Upload Photo |
| Middle Sackville Central School | 68 Church Street; Sackville NB | 45°55′48″N 64°20′55″W | Sackville municipality (6859) | | Upload Photo |
| Monument-Lefebvre National Historic Site of Canada | 488 Central Street; Memramcook NB | 45°58′45″N 64°34′02″W | Federal (11430, (14701), Memramcook municipality (5526) | | |
| Morice House | 400 Main Street; Sackville NB | 45°55′34″N 64°21′27″W | Sackville municipality (6854) | | Upload Photo |
| Morice's Mill Pond | 3 Morice Drive; Sackville NB | 45°55′35″N 64°21′25″W | Sackville municipality (5406) | | Upload Photo |
| Moulée Poirier | 349 Main Street; Shediac NB | 46°13′09″N 64°32′34″W | Shediac municipality (9413) | | Upload Photo |
| Willie Niles Smokehouse | 919 Bas-Cap-Pele Road; Cap-Pele NB | 46°13′45″N 64°15′22″W | Cap-Pele municipality (7106) | | Upload Photo |
| Notre-Dame de l'Annonciation Church | 1021 Principale Street; Memramcook NB | 45°57′45″N 64°38′03″W | Memramcook municipality (5951) | | Upload Photo |
| Notre-Dame de Lourdes Church | 7 Aboujagane Road; Memramcook NB | 46°00′41″N 64°30′54″W | Memramcook municipality (5952) | | Upload Photo |
| Office of the First World Acadian Congress | 705 Acadie Avenue; Dieppe NB | 46°04′31″N 64°43′37″W | Dieppe municipality (12851) | | Upload Photo |
| Old School | 417 Amirault Street; Dieppe NB | 46°04′54″N 64°43′54″W | Dieppe municipality (6478) | | Upload Photo |
| Old Waverley Hotel | 30-32 Victoria Street; Shediac NB | 46°13′06″N 64°32′28″W | Shediac municipality (4908) | | Upload Photo |
| Ouellet Tinsmith and Hardware Store | 347 Main Street; Shediac NB | 46°13′09″N 64°32′35″W | Shediac municipality (9965) | | Upload Photo |
| Judge Alfred E. Oulton House | 5022 Main Street; Dorchester NB | 45°53′49″N 64°30′49″W | Dorchester municipality (17445) | | Upload Photo |
| Owens Art Gallery | 61 York Street; Sackville NB | 45°53′57″N 64°22′22″W | Sackville municipality (4660) | | |
| Dr. Charles Paisley House | 42 York Street; Sackville NB | 45°53′54″N 64°22′16″W | Sackville municipality (5374) | | Upload Photo |
| Palmer Restaurant | 65 Lorne Street; Sackville NB | 45°53′27″N 64°22′05″W | Sackville municipality (6934) | | Upload Photo |
| Hiram Weldon Palmer House | 76 Water Street; Dorchester NB | 45°53′15″N 64°31′07″W | Dorchester municipality (17444) | | Upload Photo |
| Marcus Barlow Palmer House | 81 Water Street; Dorchester NB | 45°53′20″N 64°31′12″W | Dorchester municipality (17563) | | Upload Photo |
| Parker House | 100 Peter Street; Salisbury NB | 46°01′49″N 65°02′49″W | Salisbury municipality (16953) | | Upload Photo |
| Parliament House | 502 Acadie Avenue; Dieppe NB | 46°05′50″N 64°45′15″W | Dieppe municipality (12778) | | Upload Photo |
| Pascal-Poirier House | 399 Main Street; Shediac NB | 46°13′09″N 64°32′16″W | New Brunswick (1249) | | Upload Photo |
| Dick Perry Forge | 374 Acadie Avenue; Dieppe NB | 46°05′41″N 64°45′00″W | Dieppe municipality (8774) | | Upload Photo |
| Thomas Pickard House | 90 York Street; Sackville NB | 45°54′00″N 64°22′42″W | Sackville municipality (6860) | | Upload Photo |
| Picnic Shelter / Lodge | Fort Beauséjour NHS; Aulac NB | 45°52′05″N 64°17′21″W | Federal (9906) | | Upload Photo |
| Picnic Shelter / Pavilion | Fort Beauséjour NHS; Aulac NB | 45°52′05″N 64°17′20″W | Federal (9611) | | Upload Photo |
| Poirier/Gallant Building | 350-356 Main Street; Shediac NB | 46°13′11″N 64°32′36″W | Shediac municipality (9466) | | Upload Photo |
| Powell Block | 2 Bridge Street; Sackville NB | 45°53′52″N 64°22′05″W | Sackville municipality (6851) | | Upload Photo |
| Pox Cemetery | 2475 Acadie Road; Cap-Pele NB | 46°12′51″N 64°17′32″W | Cap-Pele municipality (6579) | | Upload Photo |
| President's Cottage | 146 Main Street; Sackville NB | 45°54′00″N 64°22′21″W | Sackville municipality (5463) | | Upload Photo |
| Captain John Purdy House | 34 Queens Road; Sackville NB | 45°53′27″N 64°22′16″W | Sackville municipality (7728) | | Upload Photo |
| Alexander Robb House | 21 Woodlawn Road; Dorchester NB | 45°54′01″N 64°30′49″W | Dorchester municipality (17446) | | Upload Photo |
| Sackville Cemetery | 109 York Street; Sackville NB | 45°54′04″N 64°22′46″W | Sackville municipality (6935) | | Upload Photo |
| Sackville Harness Shop | 39 Main Street; Sackville NB | 45°53′42″N 64°22′13″W | Sackville municipality (5264) | | Upload Photo |
| Sackville Wharf | Old Shipyard Road, east side of CN tracks Sackville NB | 45°53′01″N 64°22′03″W | Sackville municipality (5552) | | Upload Photo |
| Sainte-Anne-de-Beaumont Chapel | 643 Beaumont Road; Memramcook NB | 45°53′29″N 64°34′48″W | New Brunswick (1578) | | |
| Saint-Anselme Cemetery | 1014 Amirault Street; Dieppe NB | 46°04′15″N 64°43′07″W | Dieppe municipality (6532) | | Upload Photo |
| Saint-Anselme Church | 1014 Amirault Street; Dieppe NB | 46°04′12″N 64°43′13″W | Dieppe municipality (9464) | | |
| Saint James Presbyterian Church | 4967 Main Street; Dorchester NB | 45°54′05″N 64°31′03″W | Dorchester municipality (17461) | | Upload Photo |
| Saint-Joseph Parish Cemetery | 415 Main Street; Shediac NB | 46°13′07″N 64°32′05″W | Shediac municipality (4887) | | Upload Photo |
| St. Paul's Anglican Church | 123 Main Street; Sackville NB | 45°53′59″N 64°22′07″W | Sackville municipality (6919) | | Upload Photo |
| Sainte-Thérèse Church | 453 Acadie Avenue; Dieppe NB | 46°05′48″N 64°45′10″W | Dieppe municipality (9472) | | Upload Photo |
| Sainte-Thérèse Convent | 522 Acadie Avenue; Dieppe NB | 46°05′51″N 64°45′17″W | Dieppe municipality (9471) | | Upload Photo |
| Sainte-Thérèse-d'Avila Cemetery | 2648 Acadie Road; Cap-Pele NB | 46°12′52″N 64°16′14″W | Cap-Pele municipality (6807) | | Upload Photo |
| Saint-Thomas de Memramcook Church | 576 Centrale Street; Memramcook NB | 45°58′35″N 64°33′57″W | Memramcook municipality (6766) | | |
| Saint-Thomas de Memramcook Parish Catholic Cemetery | Centrale Street; Memramcook NB | 45°58′32″N 64°34′02″W | Memramcook municipality (7632) | | Upload Photo |
| Salisbury Masonic Temple | 3132 Main Street; Salisbury NB | 46°01′38″N 65°02′22″W | Salisbury municipality (16941) | | Upload Photo |
| Scovil House | 218 Main Street; Shediac NB | 46°13′08″N 64°33′30″W | Shediac municipality (4401) | | Upload Photo |
| Second World War House | 15 Airport Road; Dieppe NB | 46°06′09″N 64°40′49″W | Dieppe municipality (6481) | | Upload Photo |
| Shediac Bay Marina | Pleasant Street; Shediac NB | 46°13′36″N 64°32′44″W | Shediac municipality (9970) | | Upload Photo |
| Shediac Railway Station | 231 Belliveau Avenue; Shediac NB | 46°13′13″N 64°32′27″W | Shediac municipality (9467) | | Upload Photo |
| Shediac United Baptist Church | 133 Hanington Road; Shediac NB | 46°13′12″N 64°33′57″W | Shediac municipality (4905) | | Upload Photo |
| Sir Albert Smith House | 22 Woodlawn Road; Dorchester NB | 45°54′02″N 64°30′50″W | Dorchester municipality (17443) | | Upload Photo |
| W. Albert Smith House | 1 High Marsh Road; Sackville NB | 45°56′01″N 64°20′34″W | Sackville municipality (6955) | | Upload Photo |
| Tait House | 293 Main Street; Shediac NB | 46°13′08″N 64°32′55″W | Shediac municipality (4394) | | Upload Photo |
| Tait Melanson Block | 170 Main Street; Shediac NB | 46°13′11″N 64°32′37″W | Shediac municipality (6137) | | Upload Photo |
| Thompson-Landry Building | 351 Main Street; Shediac NB | 46°13′09″N 64°32′34″W | Shediac municipality (9414) | | Upload Photo |
| Joseph Thompson House | 107 Church Street; Sackville NB | 45°55′58″N 64°20′41″W | Sackville municipality (7157) | | Upload Photo |
| Tonge's Island | Brown Road; Sackville NB | 45°51′10″N 64°16′41″W | Federal (14586) | | |
| Trinity Anglican Church | 5005 Main Street; Dorchester NB | 45°53′53″N 64°30′55″W | Dorchester municipality (17562) | | Upload Photo |
| Upper Sackville United Church | 148 Pond Shore Road; Sackville NB | 45°56′25″N 64°20′54″W | Sackville municipality (6682) | | Upload Photo |
| Vieille Église de Saint-Henri de Barachois | Highway 133; Barachois NB | 46°13′29″N 64°25′22″W | New Brunswick (2576) | | Upload Photo |
| Visitor Centre / Museum | Fort Beauséjour NHS; Aulac NB | 45°52′N 64°17′W | Federal (3148) | | |
| John Clarence Webster House | 114 Riverside Promenade; Shediac NB | 46°12′55″N 64°33′04″W | Shediac municipality (4403) | | |
| Weldon House Hotel | 3516 Cape Road; Dorchester NB | 45°53′57″N 64°31′02″W | Dorchester municipality (17566) | | Upload Photo |
| Wood Block | 14 Bridge Street; Sackville NB | 45°53′52″N 64°22′03″W | New Brunswick (5886), Sackville municipality (5355) | | Upload Photo |

== See also ==
- List of historic places in New Brunswick
- List of National Historic Sites of Canada in New Brunswick
