= New Brunswick Route 15 =

Highway in New Brunswick

Route 15
- Route 15 highlighted in red.

Route information
- Maintained by New Brunswick Department of Transportation
- Length: 79.0 km (49.1 mi)
- Existed: 1920s–present

Major junctions
- West end: Route 106 / Route 114 in Moncton
- Route 2 (TCH) / Route 11 in Dieppe; Route 11 in Shediac
- East end: Route 16 (TCH) / Route 970 in Strait Shores

Location
- Country: Canada
- Province: New Brunswick
- Major cities: Moncton, Dieppe, Shediac, Cap-Pelé

Highway system
- Provincial highways in New Brunswick; Former routes
← Route 11	→ Route 16

Route 15 is 79 kilometres (49 mi) long and is in the southeastern corner of the province of New Brunswick. Starting at the north end of the Petitcodiac River Causeway, it loops around the city of Moncton on Wheeler Boulevard, then turns northeast from Dieppe to Shediac. From there, it turns east and bypasses Cap-Pelé crossing the Scoudouc River, then southeast to meet the Trans-Canada Highway at Port Elgin. The highway is a divided freeway from Moncton to just east of Shediac, where it remains a controlled-access highway until east of Cap-Pele.

== History ==
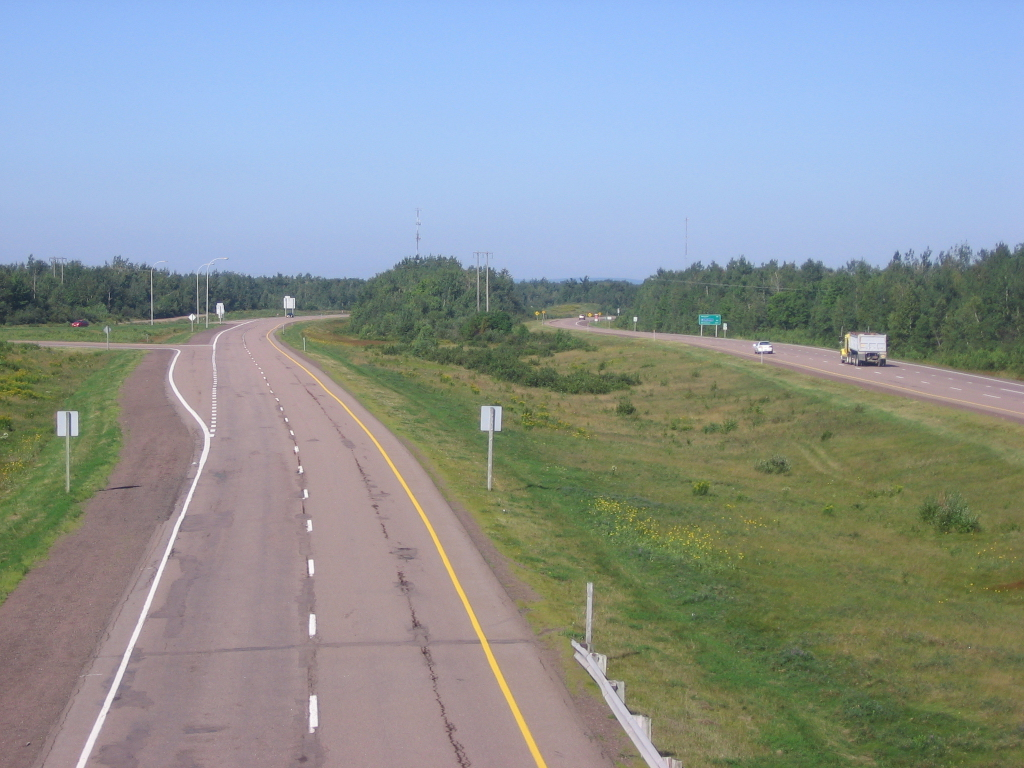
Route 15 as it passes outside Shediac, New Brunswick at Exit 37. The image shows the wide median that the Province of New Brunswick generally employs on its divided highways. This portion of highway was completed about 1970.

Route 15 only extended from Shediac to Strait Shores until the early 1970s, when the Shediac Four-Lane Highway (the first rural expressway in New Brunswick) was built from Dieppe to Shediac. Its construction was controversial, with critics alleging that it was only built to give Moncton-area politicians better access to their summer cottages in the Shediac area. A two-lane bypass of Shediac itself was built shortly afterward.

The Wheeler Boulevard was developed and constructed through the 1970s and 1980s, and was fully complete by 1989.

A two-lane bypass of Cap-Pele opened to traffic in 1998.

In 2012, a section of this highway between Moncton and Shediac was designated "Veteran's Memorial Highway".

== Major intersections ==
The entire route is in Westmorland County.

Location	km	mi	Exit	Destinations	Notes
Moncton	0.0	0.0		Route 106 (Salisbury Road / Main Street) – Moncton Centre, Salisbury; Route 114 west (Causeway Boulevard) – Riverview, Fundy National Park	Roundabout; eastern terminus of Route 114
Moncton	0.3	0.19	0	Baig Boulevard	At-grade intersection; no access from Baig Boulevard to eastbound Route 15
Moncton			Western end of freeway		
Moncton	1.4	0.87	1	St. George Boulevard	
Moncton	3.0	1.9	3	Route 128 (Killam Drive) to Route 2 (TCH) west – Fredericton, Saint John	
Moncton	5.4	3.4	5	Route 126 (Mountain Road) – Magnetic Hill	No direct access from westbound Route 15 to southbound Route 126
Moncton	6.1	3.8	6	Mapleton Road	No access to westbound Route 15; westbound access to southbound Mountain Road (Route 126)
Moncton	9.0	5.6	7	Morton Avenue / Connaught Avenue – Université de Moncton	
Moncton	9.9	6.2	8	Université Avenue – Université de Moncton	
Moncton			Eastern end of freeway		
Moncton	10.6	6.6		Route 134 (Lewisville Road / Botsford Street)	
Moncton; Dieppe	11.3– 11.8	7.0– 7.3		Route 106 (Main Street) to Route 134 – Dieppe	Roundabout
Moncton; Dieppe			Western end of freeway		
Moncton; Dieppe	12.2	7.6	10	Paul Street	
Moncton; Dieppe	14.5	9.0	14	Industrial Street	Eastbound exit only
Moncton; Dieppe	16.3	10.1	16	To Route 134 / Harrisville Boulevard / Dieppe Boulevard – Roméo LeBlanc International Airport	
Moncton; Dieppe	18.0	11.2	17	Roméo LeBlanc International Airport	Eastbound exit and entrance
Moncton; Dieppe	19.4	12.1	19	Route 2 (TCH) / Route 11 begins – Sackville, Nova Scotia, Saint John, Fredericton	Signed as exits 19A (east) and 19B (west); Route 2 exit 467; Route 11 southern terminus; west end of Route 11 concurrency
Scoudouc	26.7	16.6	26	Industrial Drive	
Shediac	31.0	19.3	-	Route 11 north – Shediac, Kouchibouguac National Park, Miramichi	Eastbound exit and westbound entrance; east end of Route 11 concurrency; Route 11 exit 0 (unsigned)
Shediac	32.2	20.0	31	Route 132 to Route 11 north / Route 133 – Scoudouc, Shediac, Kouchibouguac National Park, Miramichi	Eastbound access to Route 11
Shediac	37.6	23.4	37	Route 140 north / Line Road – Shediac, Parlee Beach	Southern terminus of Route 140
Grand-Barachois	43.4	27.0	43	Route 933 to Route 133 – Haute Aboujagane, Grand-Barachois	
Robichaud	46.0	28.6	46	To Route 133 – Cormier Village, Grand-Barachois	
Cap-Pelé	52.6	32.7	53	Route 950 to Route 133 / Route 945 – Cap-Pelé, St-André-LeBlanc	
Cap-Pelé			Eastern end of freeway		
Cap-Pelé	57.1	35.5		Route 133 west (Acadie Road)	Eastern terminus of Route 133
Shemogue	64.2	39.9		Route 940 south – Sackville	Northern terminus of Route 940
Shemogue	64.8	40.3		Route 950 west – Petit-Cap	Eastern terminus of Route 950
Mates Corner	69.0	42.9		Route 955 east – Murray Corner	Western terminus of Route 955
Strait Shores	78.8	49.0		Route 16 (TCH) – Sackville, Amherst, Prince Edward Island; Route 970 south (Shemogue Road) – Strait Shores, Baie Verte	Roundabout; Route 16 exit 25
1.000 mi = 1.609 km; 1.000 km = 0.621 mi: Concurrency terminus; Incomplete access

== See also ==
- List of New Brunswick provincial highways
