= Bourque =

Bourque is a surname of Acadian origin. Notable people with the surname include:

- Chris Bourque (born 1986), American ice hockey player (son of Ray, brother of Ryan)
- Claude Bourque (1915–1982), Canadian ice hockey player
- Curt Bourque (born 1967), American horse-racing jockey
- David Bourque (born 1955), Canadian musician
- E. A. Bourque (1887–1962), Canadian politician; Mayor of Ottawa 1949–50
- Edna Bourque (1915–2012), Canadian volunteer with the elderly
- François Bourque (born 1984), Canadian Olympic skier
- Gabriel Bourque (born 1990), Canadian ice hockey player
- James Bourque (1935–1996), Canadian First Nations activist
- John Samuel Bourque (1894–1974), Canadian politician from Quebec; provincial legislator 1935–60; government minister
- Justin Bourque (born 1989), Canadian convicted triple murderer
- Mark Bourque (1948–2005), Canadian RCMP officer; killed while working with the UN in Haiti
- Mavrik Bourque (born 2002), Canadian ice hockey player
- Pat Bourque (born 1947), American baseball player
- Phil Bourque (born 1962), American ice hockey player
- Pierre Bourque (born 1942), Québécois politician; mayor of Montreal 1994–2001
- Pierre Bourque (1958–2021), Canadian Internet entrepreneur
- Ray Bourque (born 1960), Canadian ice hockey player (father of Chris and Ryan)
- Raymond Bourque (1917–1998), Canadian politician
- René Bourque (born 1981), Canadian ice hockey player
- Romuald Bourque (1889–1974), Canadian politician from Quebec; MP 1952–74
- Ryan Bourque (born 1991), American ice hockey player (son of Ray, brother of Chris)
- Thomas-Jean Bourque (1864–1952), Canadian politician from New Brunswick; MP 1917–52
- Walter H. Bourque Jr. (1937–2025), American child murderer
- Wayne Bourque (born 1959), Canadian North American Native boxing champion
