= Edna Bourque =

Canadian volunteer (1915–2012)

- Born: Edna Leblanc; 27 July 1915; Haute-Aboujagane (Beaubassin East), New Brunswick, Canada
- Died: 20 January 2012 (aged 96); Moncton, New Brunswick
- Known for: Volunteer service
- Awards: Governor General's Caring Canadian Award

Edna Bourque (1915–2012) was a Canadian volunteer recognized for her involvement with the elderly. Her involvement earned her several distinctions, including the Order of Francophones of America, the Order of La Pléiade and the Governor General's Caring Canadian Award.

== Biography ==
Edna Leblanc was born on 27 July 1915 in Haute Aboujagane, now a hamlet of Beaubassin East, in southeastern New Brunswick. Her parents were Félicien Leblanc and Joséline Cormier. She married Antonio Bourque, and first lived in Moncton before retiring to Villa Providence in Shediac.

Edna Bourque was President of the New Brunswick Senior Citizens Federation and the International Francophone Seniors Association (AIFA). She chaired the Club de l'âge d'or du Christ-Roy (English: Golden Age Club of Christ the King) in Moncton and was vice-president of Mount Saint Vincent University and of the home schools and ladies' auxiliary of the Sisters of Charity of Saint Vincent de Paul (Halifax). Bourque was decorated with the Order of Francophones of America in 1988, the Order of La Pléiade in 1990 and the 2007 Governor General's Caring Canadian Award.

Bourque died on 20 January 2012 at the Dr. Georges-L.-Dumont University Hospital Centre in Moncton at the age of 96.

== See also ==
- Organisation internationale de la Francophonie
