= Shediac Bay =

Tidal embayment in New Brunswick, Canada

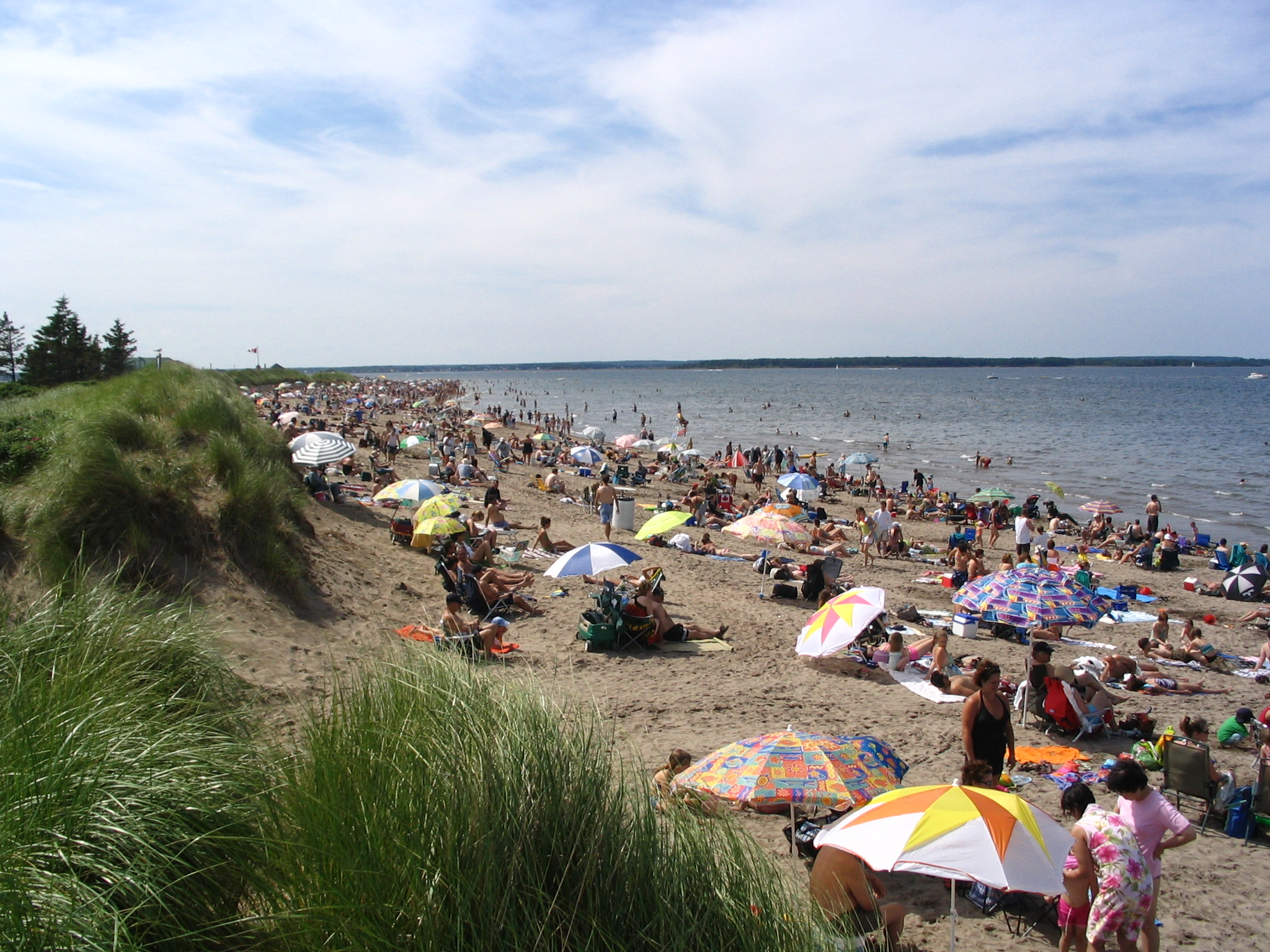
- Parlee Beach faces the Shediac Bay
- Interactive map of Shediac Bay
- Coordinates: 46°22′N 64°53′W
- Area: 122 square kilometres (47 sq mi)

Shediac Bay is a tidal embayment, an extension of the Northumberland Strait in New Brunswick, Canada.

It is located about 50 km (31 mi) north-east of Moncton. The nearest population centre is Shediac. There is a large island in the bay, Shediac Island.

There is one major beach, Parlee Beach, which runs close. The bay contains Shediac Harbour which is a popular touristic, boating and fishing area. The Canadian Coast Guard maintain an inshore rescue boat station (CCG IRB Shediac) at Pointe du Chêne.

== History ==
Skull Island is a small island within the harbour. Its name comes from the discovery of skulls on the site by archaeologists. The population of the island was once composed of Micmac and Acadian Wabanaki soldiers.

In 2019, Hurricane Dorian accelerated the erosion of the island.

The bay was a stopover location for Italo Balbo's transatlantic mass flight in 1933.

Major streams feeding into the bay are the Shediac River, Bateman Brook, and Scoudouc River.

== See also ==
Notable landforms and features nearby:

- Parlee Beach Provincial Park
- Greater Shediac
- Pointe-du-Chêne
