= New Brunswick Route 933 =

Highway in New Brunswick, Canada

Coordinates: 46.094097°N 64.419022°W

Route 933

Route information
- Maintained by New Brunswick Department of Transportation
- Length: 32 km (20 mi)

Major junctions
- North end: Route 133 in Barachois
- Route 15 in Barachois; Route 2 (TCH) in Memramcook
- South end: Route 106 in Memramcook

Location
- Country: Canada
- Province: New Brunswick

Highway system
- Provincial highways in New Brunswick; Former routes
← Route 925	→ Route 935

Route 933 is a 32.2-kilometre (20.0 mi) long north to south secondary highway in the southeastern portion of New Brunswick, Canada.

== Route description ==
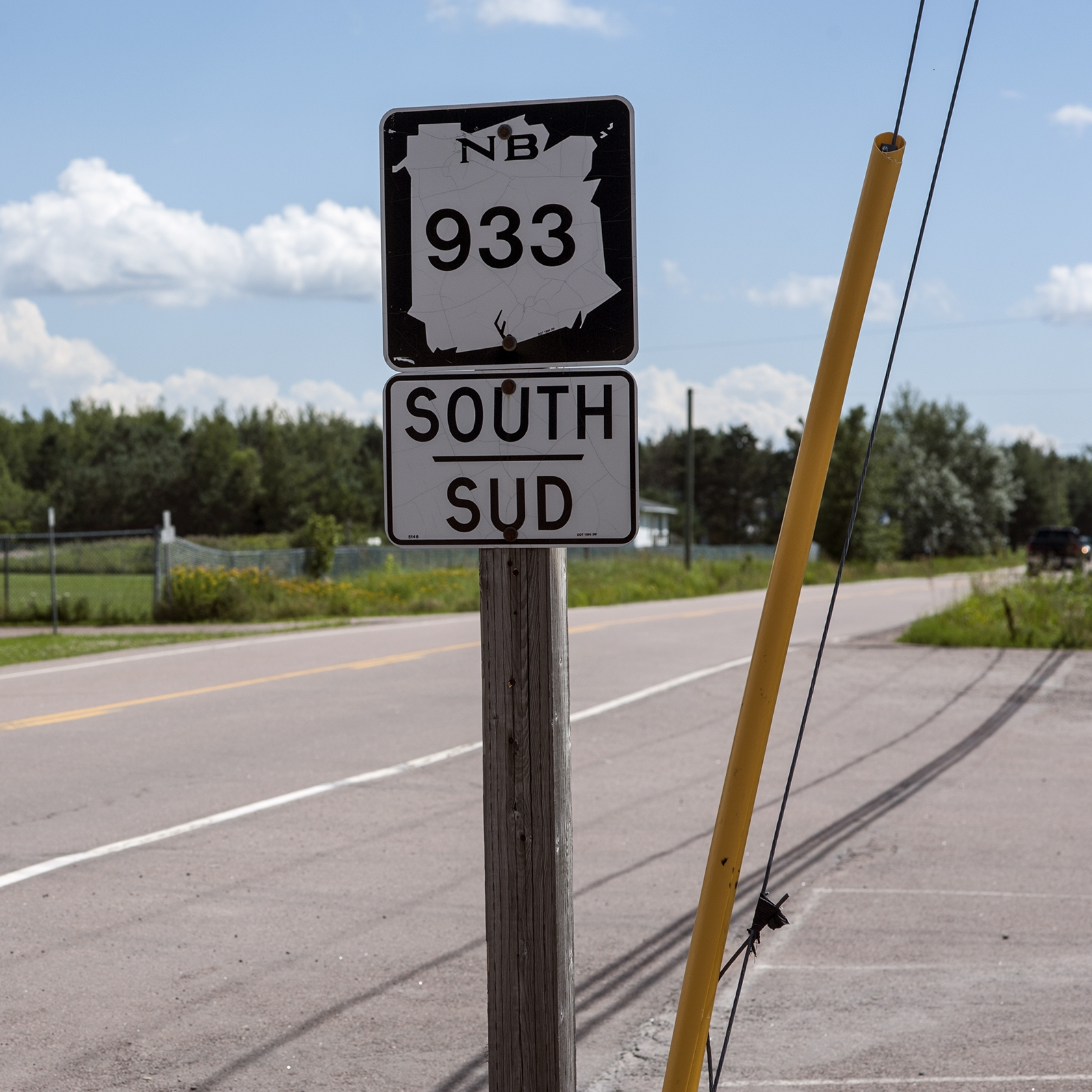
Route sign

Most of the route is in Westmorland County.

The route's northern terminus is in Barachois at Route 133. It travels south through a mostly wooded area where it begins following the Aboujagane River passing over Route 15 exit 43 where the route is known as Upper Aboujagane Rd. The route passes through Village Scandainave Glaude, Scoudouc Road, then Bourgeois Mills. The route continues southeast passing the western terminus of Route 945 in Haute-Aboujagane, Basse-Aboujagane, and Drisdelle. The route then briefly turns east where it is known as Malakoff Rd then continues southwest on Aboujagane Rd as a gravel road to Memramcook East. From here the route briefly turns north on Memramcook East Rd then turns east onto Pont Rouge Rd crossing Route 2 Exit 488 then ending in Memramcook at Route 106 near Memramcook River.
