= New Brunswick Route 950 =

Highway in New Brunswick, Canada

Route 950

Route information
- Maintained by New Brunswick Department of Transportation
- Length: 22.0 km (13.7 mi)

Major junctions
- West end: Route 15 in Cap-Pelé
- Route 15 / Route 133 in Cap-Pelé
- East end: Route 15 / Route 940 in Shemogue

Location
- Country: Canada
- Province: New Brunswick
- Counties: Westmorland

Highway system
- Provincial highways in New Brunswick; Former routes
← Route 945	→ Route 955

Route 950 is a Canadian highway in Westmorland County, New Brunswick.

The 22 kilometre road runs from an intersection with Route 15 at Cap-Pelé, to an intersection with Route 15 to the east in Shemogue.

== Communities along Route 950 ==
- Cap-Pelé
- Bas-Cap-Pelé
- Trois-Ruisseaux
- Petit-Cap
- Shemogue

== See also ==
- List of New Brunswick provincial highways
