= New Brunswick Route 140 =

Highway in New Brunswick, Canada

Route 140

Route information
- Maintained by New Brunswick Department of Transportation
- Length: 1.567 km (0.974 mi)
- Existed: 1984–present

Major junctions
- South end: Route 15 in Shediac
- North end: Route 133 in Rings Corner

Location
- Country: Canada
- Province: New Brunswick
- Major cities: Shediac

Highway system
- Provincial highways in New Brunswick; Former routes
← Route 135	→ Route 144

Route 140, also known as Ohio Road, is a 1.567-kilometre-long (0.974 mi) north–south secondary highway in eastern New Brunswick, Canada. Route 140 is a short connector road from Route 15 (exit 37) to the entrance to Parlee Beach Provincial Park. It is the shortest numbered highway in the province.

== Description ==
Located entirely within the Westmorland County town of Shediac, Route 140 begins as a connecting exit from Route 15, travelling north for a distance of 315 metres, arriving at its endpoint at an intersection at Route 133, otherwise known as Main Street.

== History ==
The connector road has existed as early as 1978; at the time, buildings had been situated along the road.

The area around the road was home to beavers, which were removed in 2013 by the Department of Transportation and Infrastructure.

== See also ==
- List of New Brunswick provincial highways
