= New Brunswick Route 945 =

Highway in New Brunswick, Canada

Route 945

Route information
- Maintained by New Brunswick Department of Transportation
- Length: 13 km (8.1 mi)

Major junctions
- West end: Route 933 in Haute Aboujagane
- East end: Route 133 in Cap-Pelé

Location
- Country: Canada
- Province: New Brunswick
- Counties: Westmorland

Highway system
- Provincial highways in New Brunswick; Former routes
| ← Route 940 | → Route 950 |

Route 945 is a Canadian highway in Westmorland County, New Brunswick.

The 13 km (8.1 mi) road runs from an intersection with Route 933 at Haute Aboujagane in the west to an intersection with Route 133 in Cap-Pelé in the east. In 1989, an accident happened along this road. A tractor carrying logs toppled onto a tractor/wagon carrying family members and killed 13 and injured 45 others.

== Communities along Route 945 ==
- Haute Aboujagane
- Cormier Village
- Saint-André-de-Shediac
- Cap-Pelé

== See also ==
- List of New Brunswick provincial highways
