= Malakoff, New Brunswick =

Community in New Brunswick, Canada

Location of Malakoff in New Brunswick.

Malakoff is a Canadian rural community in Westmorland County, New Brunswick located approximately 4 kilometres southeast of Scoudouc and 19 kilometres east of Moncton.

== History ==
Malakoff was originally settled as a farming and lumbering community in 1866, and by 1898 the community was home to 150 people and a store. The settlement was named to commemorate the Battle of Malakoff.

== See also ==
- List of communities in New Brunswick
