= New Brunswick Route 132 =

Highway in New Brunswick

Route 132

Route information
- Maintained by New Brunswick Department of Transportation
- Length: 27.0 km (16.8 mi)
- Existed: 1965–present

Major junctions
- West end: Route 106 in Dieppe
- Route 2 (TCH) in Lakeburn
- East end: Route 11 / Route 15 in Shediac

Location
- Country: Canada
- Province: New Brunswick
- Counties: Westmorland
- Major cities: Dieppe, Scoudouc, Shediac

Highway system
- Provincial highways in New Brunswick; Former routes
← Route 130	→ Route 133

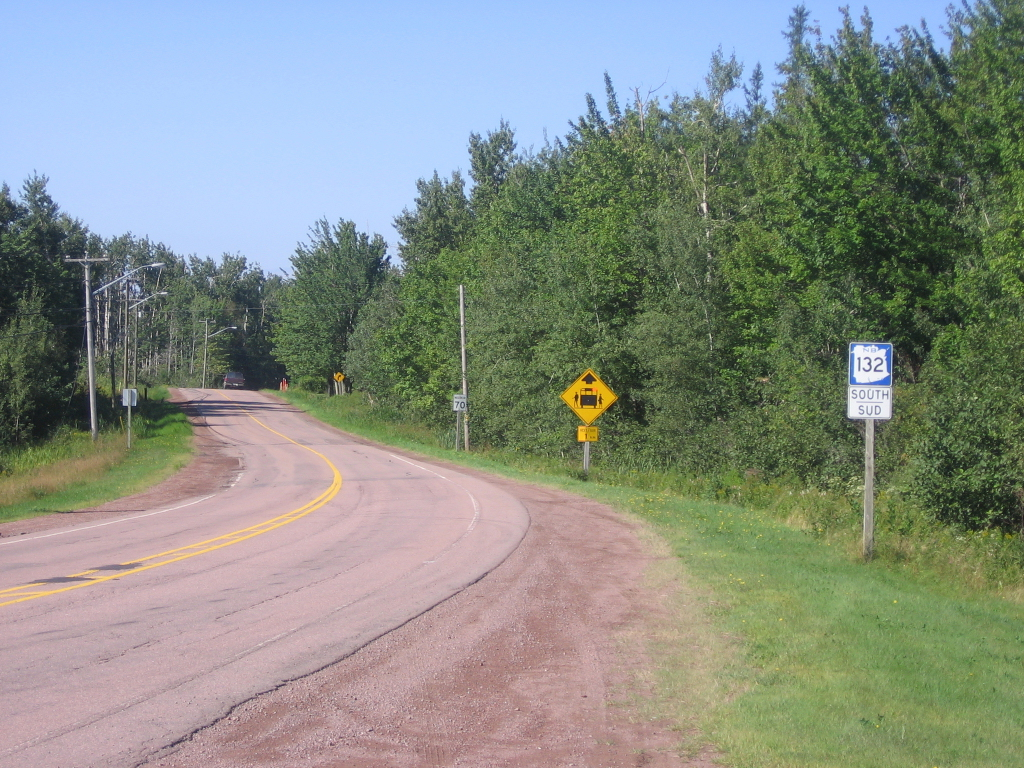
Route 132 outside Dieppe, New Brunswick

Route 132 is a New Brunswick provincial collector road that runs 27 kilometres (17 mi) between Dieppe and Shediac.

The western section is known locally as Champlain Street which consists of a four lane undivided urban arterial. The remainder of the road is a two-lane rural facility. It connects to Route 11 at its eastern terminus and to Route 106 at the western end. Route 132 also provides grade-separated links to Route 2 and Route 15.

== Communities ==
- Dieppe
- Lakeburn
- Malakoff
- Meadow Brook
- Painsec
- Scoudouc and crosses the Scoudouc River
- Shediac

== Major destinations ==
- Moncton International Airport (cargo)
- École Mathieu-Martin
- Scoudouc Industrial Park

== See also ==
- List of New Brunswick provincial highways
