= New Brunswick Route 940 =

Highway in New Brunswick, Canada

Coordinates: 46.045595°N 64.281693°W

Route 940

Route information
- Maintained by New Brunswick Department of Transportation
- Length: 36 km (22 mi)

Major junctions
- North end: Route 15 / Route 950 in Shemogue
- Route 2 (TCH) in Sackville
- South end: Route 106 in Sackville

Location
- Country: Canada
- Province: New Brunswick

Highway system
- Provincial highways in New Brunswick; Former routes
← Route 935	→ Route 945

Route 940 is a 35.2-kilometre (21.9 mi) long north to south secondary highway in the southeastern portion of New Brunswick, Canada.

== Route description ==
Most of the route is in Westmorland County.

The route's northern terminus is in Shemogue at Route 15 and Route 950. It travels southwest through a mostly treed area where it passes Square Lake. The route passes through Anderson Settlement, Centre Village then turns south in Midgic. The route again turns southwest passing through Ward then crosses the Tantramar River, entering Upper Sackville. The route passes Silver Lake then enters Middle Sackville then crosses Route 1 Exit 504 as it enters Sackville. The route passes Sackville Waterfowl Park on the Tantramar Marsh then the Tantramar Civic Centre ending at Route 106.
