= Parlee Beach Provincial Park =

Provincial park of New Brunswick, Canada

Parlee Beach Provincial Park _{Parc provincial de la Plage-Parlee (French)}
- IUCN category II (national park)
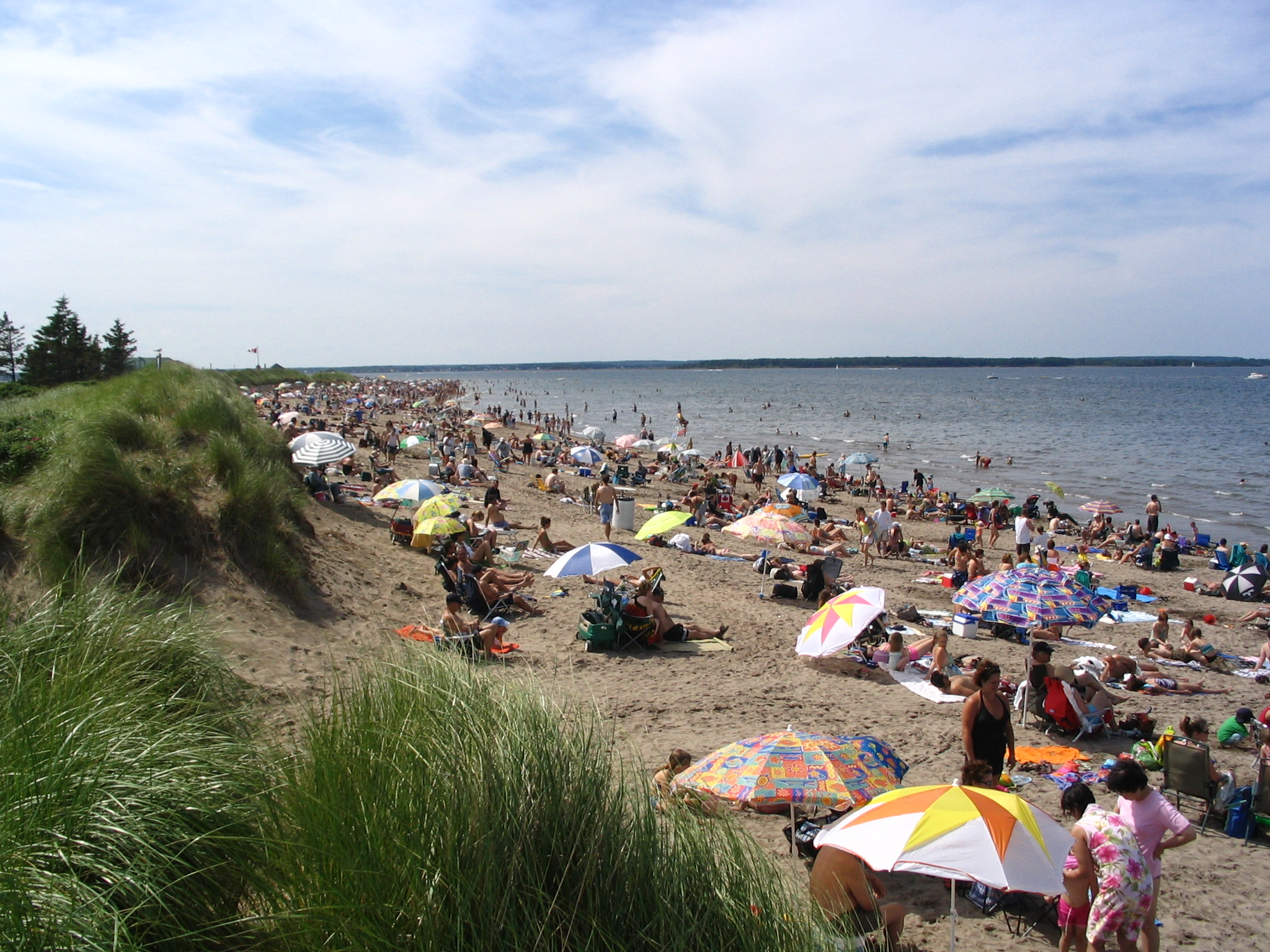
- Parlee Beach
- Interactive map of Parlee Beach Provincial Park _{Parc provincial de la Plage-Parlee (French)}
- Location: Pointe-du-Chêne, New Brunswick, Canada
- Nearest city: Dieppe
- Coordinates: 46°14′28″N 64°31′00″W
- Area: 0.64 ha (1.6 acres)
- Established: 1957 (private park since 1800s)
- Visitors: 400,000+ (in 2010)
- Governing body: Government of New Brunswick

Parlee Beach Provincial Park is a provincial park located in Pointe-du-Chêne, New Brunswick, Canada.

== Geography ==
Parlee Beach Provincial Park is located in eastern Westmorland County fronting the Northumberland Strait on the northeast side of Pointe-du-Chêne and forming the boundary with the community of Cap-Brulé.

== History ==
The park and beach received its name in 1959 in honour of T. Babbitt Parlee, the former Minister of Municipal Affairs in the ministry of New Brunswick Premier Hugh John Flemming; Parlee died in an airplane crash in 1957.

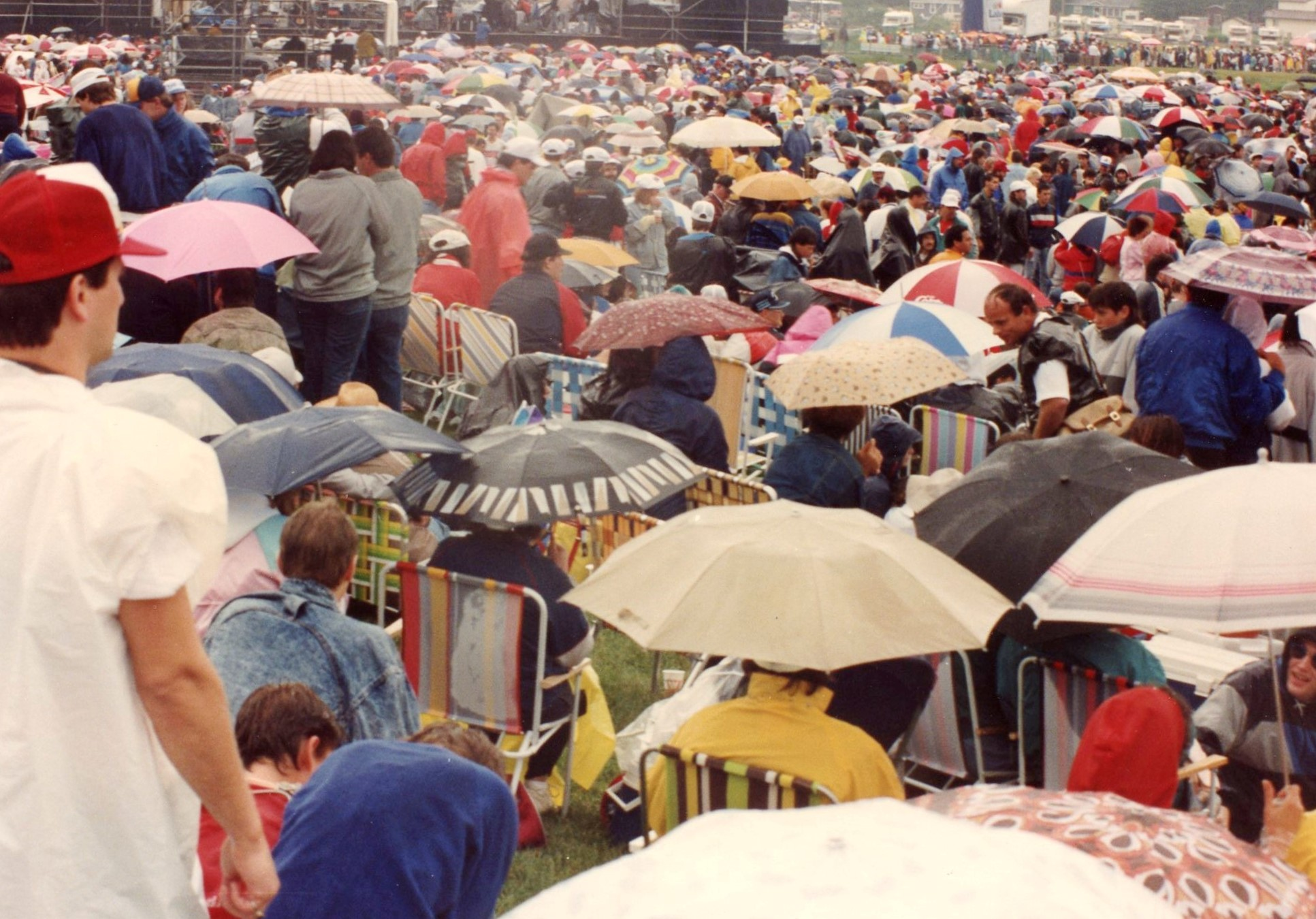
A rain-soaked crowd at the Beach Boys' Canada Day show at Parlee Beach (1989)

The park extends south from the beach approximately 1 km (0.62 mi) to Main Street (Route 133), with the campground located on the eastern boundary. In 1989, The Beach Boys played a successful concert to approximately 20,000 fans at a temporary concert stage on a large mowed green space between Main Street and the beach.

Each spring, the provincial government replaces sand on the beach that is lost due to winter storm erosion and storm surge damage.

== Present day ==
The property is owned by the Government of New Brunswick and operated by the Department of Tourism and Parks. Parlee Beach Provincial Park includes the following facilities:

- Parlee Beach, arguably the most popular beach in New Brunswick
- a 190-site campground
- a day-use picnic area
- a restaurant
- a canteen
- change houses
- showers
- washrooms
- a playground
- parking lots with a capacity for over 1,000 vehicles. Day rates for parking as of 2024 are as follows:
  - $17.39 per vehicle
  - $13.05 per motorcycle
  - $73.91 per bus
  - $143.04 for a season pass

The park is open from 9am to 4pm during the summer months. Parlee Beach is patrolled by lifeguards from the first weekend of June until Labour Day.

The waters of the Northumberland Strait are sometimes marketed as having some of the warmest ocean waters on the east coast of North America north of Virginia. Parlee Beach Provincial Park is one of New Brunswick's most popular recreational areas, and in 2011 had more than 400,000 visitation (entirely in the summer months).

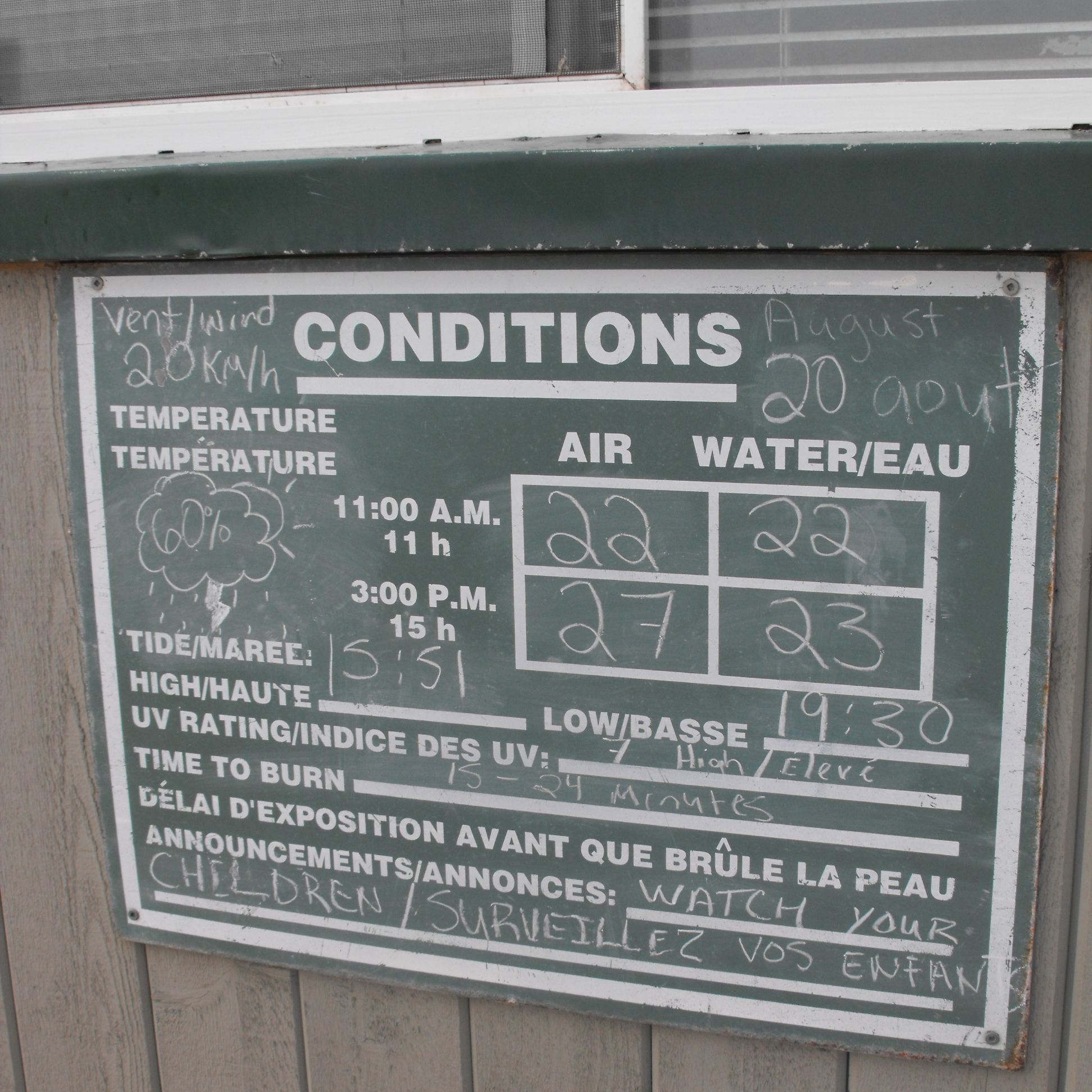
Information board showing typical summer water temperature at Parlee Beach

Visitation may have peaked in 2016 when there were 23,569 daily visitor permits sold that year. That number declined to 17,110 permits in 2017 and 15,287 in 2018. The recent decline appears to have been a result of negative publicity resulting from elevated fecal coliform counts in the water.

== Economic impact ==
The nearby town of Shediac benefits from the large number of tourists to the park and forms a summer service centre for numerous cottagers and campers who flock to the area. The popularity of Parlee Beach since the 1800s has created a cottaging area for the city of Moncton in communities surrounding Pointe-du-Chêne, ranging from the area of Cocagne and Bouctouche in the north and Barachois, Robichaud, and Cap-Pelé in the east. This was enhanced by the construction of the 4-lane Route 15 expressway from Moncton to Shediac in the 1970s.

== See also ==
- Pointe-du-Chêne
- Shediac
- List of New Brunswick parks
- List of beaches in Canada
