= Mark Bourque =

Retired Canadian police officer killed in Haiti

- Born: 1948; Stoneham, Quebec
- Died: December 20, 2005; Cité Soleil, Haiti
- Title: Sergeant, Retired; Royal Canadian Mounted Police

Mark Bourque was a Royal Canadian Mounted Police officer killed while working for the United Nations in Cité Soleil, Haiti on Tuesday, December 20, 2005.

== RCMP career ==
Prior to his mission in Haiti, Bourque had been an RCMP officer for approximately 35 years. He was stationed in the province of Quebec, where he started work in Granby and Saint-Jean-sur-Richelieu before moving on to Montreal. During his career, he was most noted for his work in money laundering. In 1986, he became heavily involved in a case involving the alleged Mafia crime family Cuntrera-Caruana, headed by Alfonso Caruana, from Siculiana, which lasted for several years. According to CTV News, "At the time, money-laundering laws were non-existent in Canada. However, Bourque's work pushed the Canadian government to put money-laundering provisions into the Criminal Code." Bourque retired from the RCMP in 2002.
