= New Brunswick Route 133 =

Highway in New Brunswick

Route 133

Route information
- Maintained by New Brunswick Department of Transportation
- Length: 28.22 km (17.54 mi)

Major junctions
- East end: Route 134 in Gilberts Corner
- West end: Route 15 in Botsford Portage

Location
- Country: Canada
- Province: New Brunswick
- Major cities: Shediac, Cap-Pelé

Highway system
- Provincial highways in New Brunswick; Former routes
← Route 132	→ Route 134

Route 133 is a mostly east/west provincial highway in the Canadian province of New Brunswick.

== Route description ==
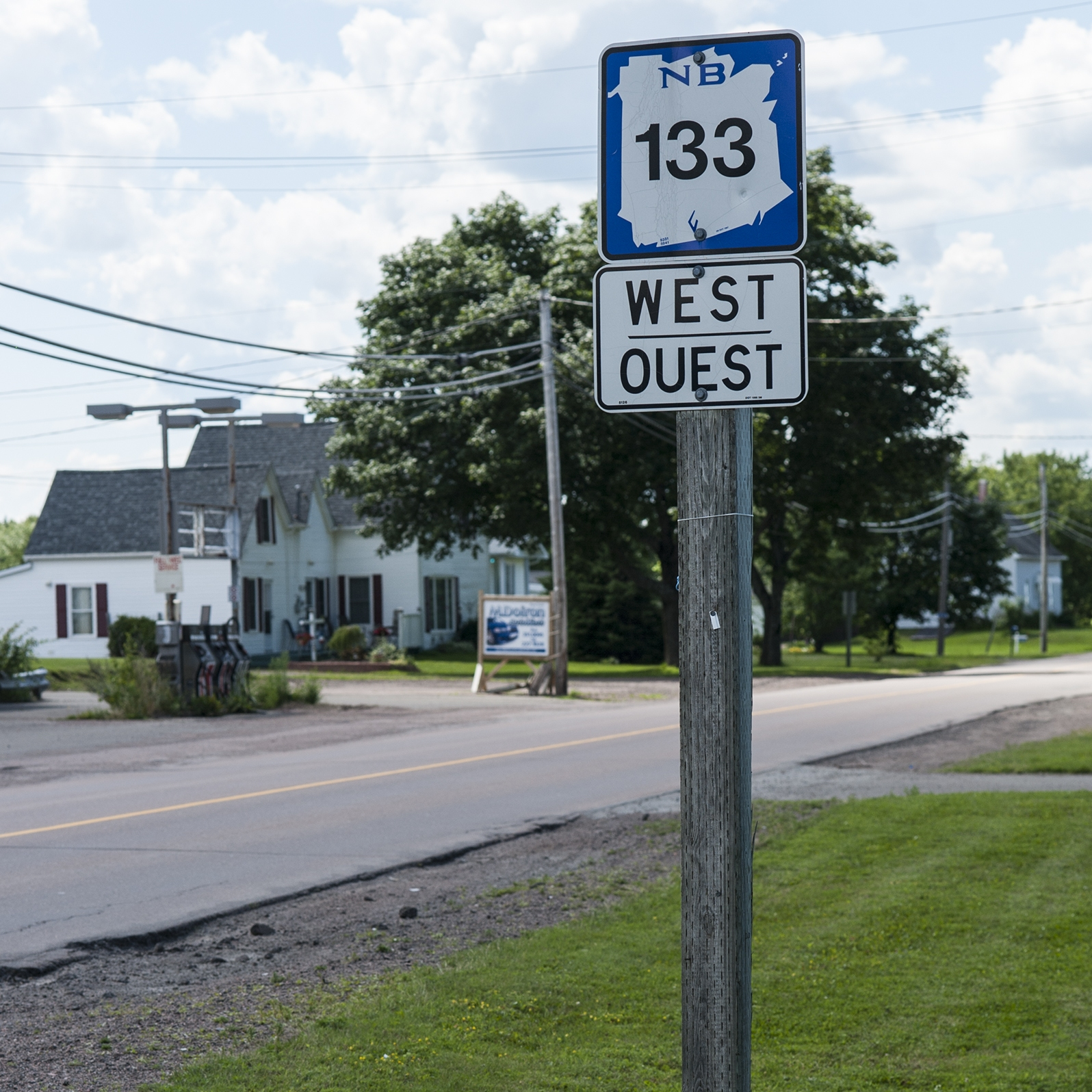
Route sign

The road is a continuation of Route 134 in Gilberts Corner. The road has a length of approximately 28 kilometres, and services small, otherwise isolated rural communities. In these areas, the highway is often unofficially referred to as "Main Street." The road runs mostly between the Northumberland Strait and Route 15 and a small portion of Route 11 in Greater Shediac. The road starts out as Hannington Road in Gilberts Corner, and is known as Main Street in Shediac. It is designated Acadie Road throughout most of the way to Route 15.

== Intersecting routes ==
- Route 134 in Gilberts Corner
- Route 140 in the Rings Corner neighbourhood of Shediac at the Parlee Beach Intersection
- Route 933 in Barachois
- Route 950 in Dupuis Corner
- Route 945 in Cap-Pelé
- Route 15 near Botsford Portage

== River crossings ==
- Scoudouc River in Shediac
- Aboujagane River in Robichaud
- Kouchibouguac River in Robichaud

== Communities along the Route ==
- Gilberts Corner
- Chapman Corner
- Shediac
- Rings Corner
- Boudreau
- Barachois
- Robichaud
- Dupuis Corner
- Cap-Pelé
- Botsford Portage

== See also ==
- List of New Brunswick provincial highways
