= Scoudouc, New Brunswick =

Scoudouc
- Community
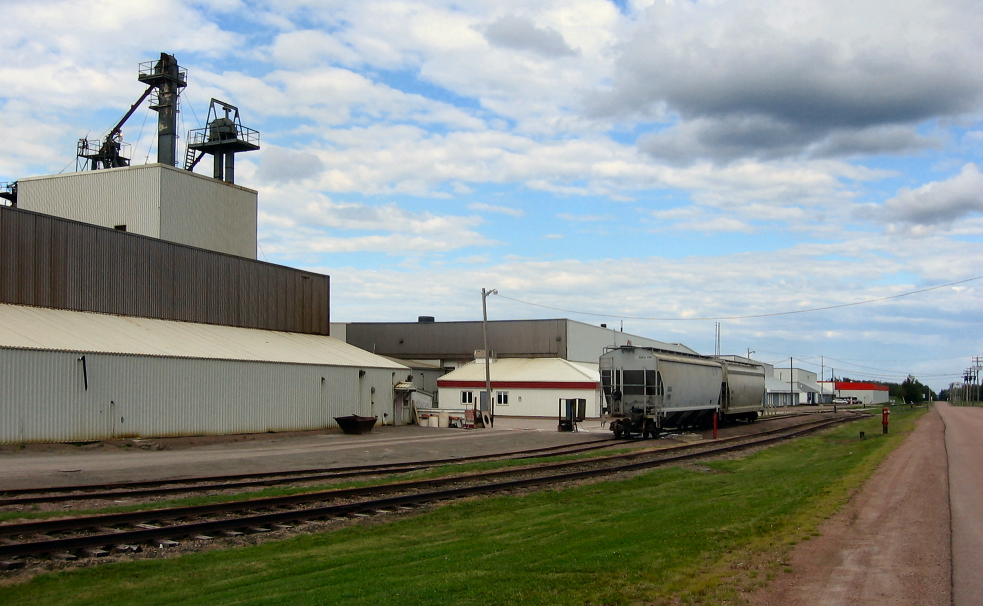
- Former Owens-Illinois glass plant in Scoudouc, New Brunswick. It was constructed in an aircraft hangar, part of an abandoned World War II air base. O-I was the latest in a long list of owners of the glass manufacturing plant.

- Location within New Brunswick
- Coordinates: 46.168657°N 64.562616°W
- Country: Canada
- Province: New Brunswick
- County: Westmorland County
- Parish: Shediac Parish
- Metropolitan areas of New Brunswick: Greater Shediac
- Founded: 1898

Government
  - Governing Body: Scoudouc Village Council

Area
  - Total: 58.59 km^{2} (22.62 sq mi)

Population (2021)
  - Total: 1,101
  - Density: 18.79/km^{2} (48.67/sq mi)
- Time zone: UTC−4 (AST)
  - Summer (DST): UTC−3 (ADT)
- Area code: 506
- Highways Route 11 Route 15: Route 132

Scoudouc is a community in New Brunswick, Canada.

The former local service district took its name from the community.

== Demographics ==
In the 2021 Census of Population conducted by Statistics Canada, Scoudouc had a population of 1,101 living in 423 of its 442 total private dwellings, a change of 1.6% from its 2016 population of 1,084. With a land area of 58.59 km^{2} (22.62 sq mi), it had a population density of 18.8/km^{2} (48.7/sq mi) in 2021.

Population of Scoudouc
Name	Parish	Population (2021)	Population (2016)	Change	Land area (km^{2})	Population density
Scoudouc part A	Shediac	1,000	1,009	−0.9%	52.21	19.2/km^{2}
Scoudouc part B	Moncton	101	75	+34.7%	6.38	15.8/km^{2}
Total	—	1,101	1,084	+1.6%	58.59	18.8/km^{2}

== Economy ==
Scoudouc is home to the Scoudouc Industrial Park.

== See also ==
- List of communities in New Brunswick
- List of communities in Greater Moncton
