= Pointe-du-Chêne, New Brunswick =

Community in Westmorland County, Canada

Coordinates: 46°14′18″N 64°31′22″W

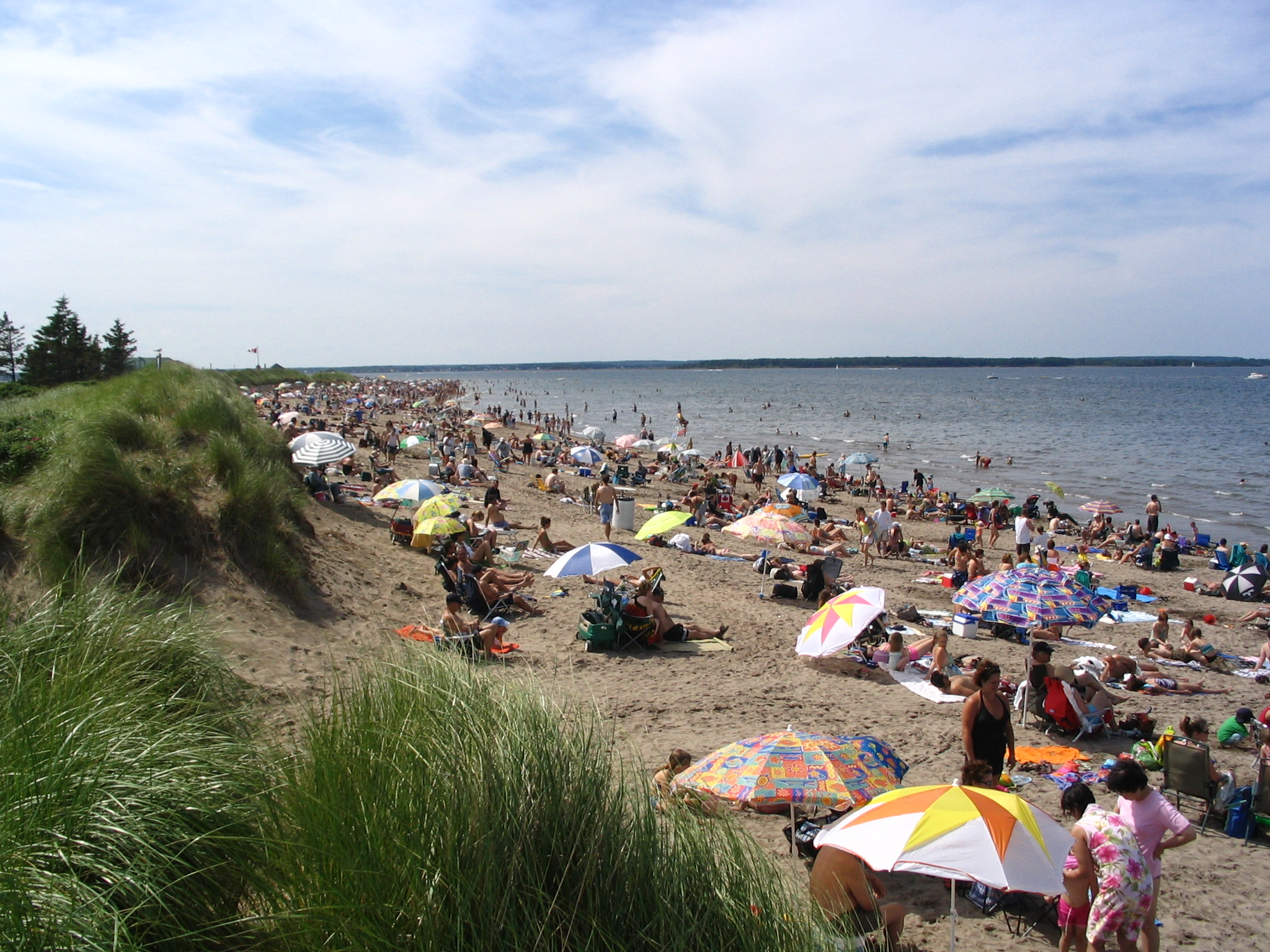
Parlee Beach, Shédiac, New Brunswick.

Pointe-du-Chêne is a community and former local service district in Westmorland County, New Brunswick. Located on Shediac Bay, an inlet of the Northumberland Strait, Pointe-du-Chêne, also called La Pointe, is the home of Parlee Beach Provincial Park. It was once the terminus of the European and North American Railway and was a key stopover for Pan-Am's Trans Atlantic air service inaugurated in 1939. Pointe-du-Chêne became a cottage resort area in the early 20th century. Summer excursion trains from Moncton brought day trippers to the seashore. The railway terminus and proximity to Parlee Beach (originally known as Gould's Beach and Belliveau's Beach, before being renamed in 1959), made it an ideal location for cottages.

== History ==
Pointe-Du-Chêne has from the very beginning been closely related to the neighbouring community of Shediac; French cartographer Jumeau mapped the whole area along Shediac Bay as “Chedaik,” and Monsignor St. Valier, who was Bishop of Quebec, referred to the area as “Chedic” during a 1686 pastoral visit to Acadia. By 1815, the community was known as “Oak Point,” due to the abundance of oak trees that grew there. By 1862, the French variant of the name, Pointe-du-Chêne, was adopted.

Though Pointe-du-Chêne first began to be settled by English-speaking settlers as early as 1810, the community did not begin to prosper until 1853 when a new government wharf was constructed. Until that time, shipping, ferrying, and general trade were conducted from the Queen's Wharf at Shediac Cape. Construction of the wharf coincided with the construction of the European and North American Railway, which chose Pointe-du-Chêne as its eastern terminus. This allowed strong potato, and livestock industries to arise in the community. As yet there was no industry in all of Shediac Bay as strong as the community's lumber industry, but as the forests of coastal Maine and England were close to depletion at this time, the abundance of oak trees in the area was considered a Godsend. By the 1840s, there were as many as twenty vessels waiting to load lumber at the wharf each day during the shipping season.

Due to the economic boom brought on by the new industry, Saint-Martins-In-The-Woods Anglican Church in nearby Shediac Cape applied for a land in Pointe-Du-Chene. They were granted 50 acres (20 ha), and to this day more than two-thirds of the land in Pointe-Du-Chene belongs to the church, which rents the land to the occupants.

A notable historical event was the arrival of the first trans-Atlantic flight by Marshal Italo Balbo. On July 13, 1933 Balbo landed in Pointe-du-Chêne accompanied by an armada of 24 Italian seaplanes. The armada departed from Rome, travelled to the Azores and Cartwright, Newfoundland and Labrador, and then landed in Pointe-du-Chêne, ultimately travelling on to Chicago. Balbo stayed at the home of the late Dr. John Clarence Webster, and from there he telephoned "Il Duce" Benito Mussolini to describe the voyage. Later in the decade, during the summer of 1939, Pan American Airways established a trans-Atlantic air-route, using Pointe-du-Chêne as one of its terminals. Pan Am Clipper flying boats departed from Port Washington, Long Island, stopped at the Pointe-du-Chêne wharf, then travelled to Botwood, Newfoundland and Foynes, Ireland or Lisbon, Portugal, finally terminating in Southampton. The Clipper service predated the use of runways for large aircraft, and flying boats were required to land in the water.

Pointe-du-Chêne is, to many, synonymous with nearby Parlee Beach. When Moncton emerged as a major city in New Brunswick, the Sunday train to Pointe-du-Chêne became an institution. With upwards of 20 railway passenger cars filled with families and children, the train would leave the Moncton railway station at 1:30 pm for the Pointe-du-Chêne railway station; the return train would depart at 7:00 pm. To this day, Parlee Beach Provincial Park is still a popular summer destination for residents of Moncton and visitors to New Brunswick.

== Demographics ==
In the 2021 Census of Population conducted by Statistics Canada, Pointe-du-Chêne had a population of 767 living in 442 of its 896 total private dwellings, a change of 7.1% from its 2016 population of 716. With a land area of 2.3 km^{2} (0.89 sq mi), it had a population density of 333.5/km^{2} (863.7/sq mi) in 2021.

== Popular culture ==
- Pointe-du-Chêne is described in the novelist Ken Follett's Night Over Water.
- Tom Leighton has written a song about Pointe-du-Chêne.

== Notable people ==
- Emile Duprée - former professional wrestler, father of René Duprée.

== See also ==
- List of communities in New Brunswick
- Night Over Water, Ken Follett novel depicting Pointe-du-Chêne and the Clipper service
