= Cap-Acadie =

- Town
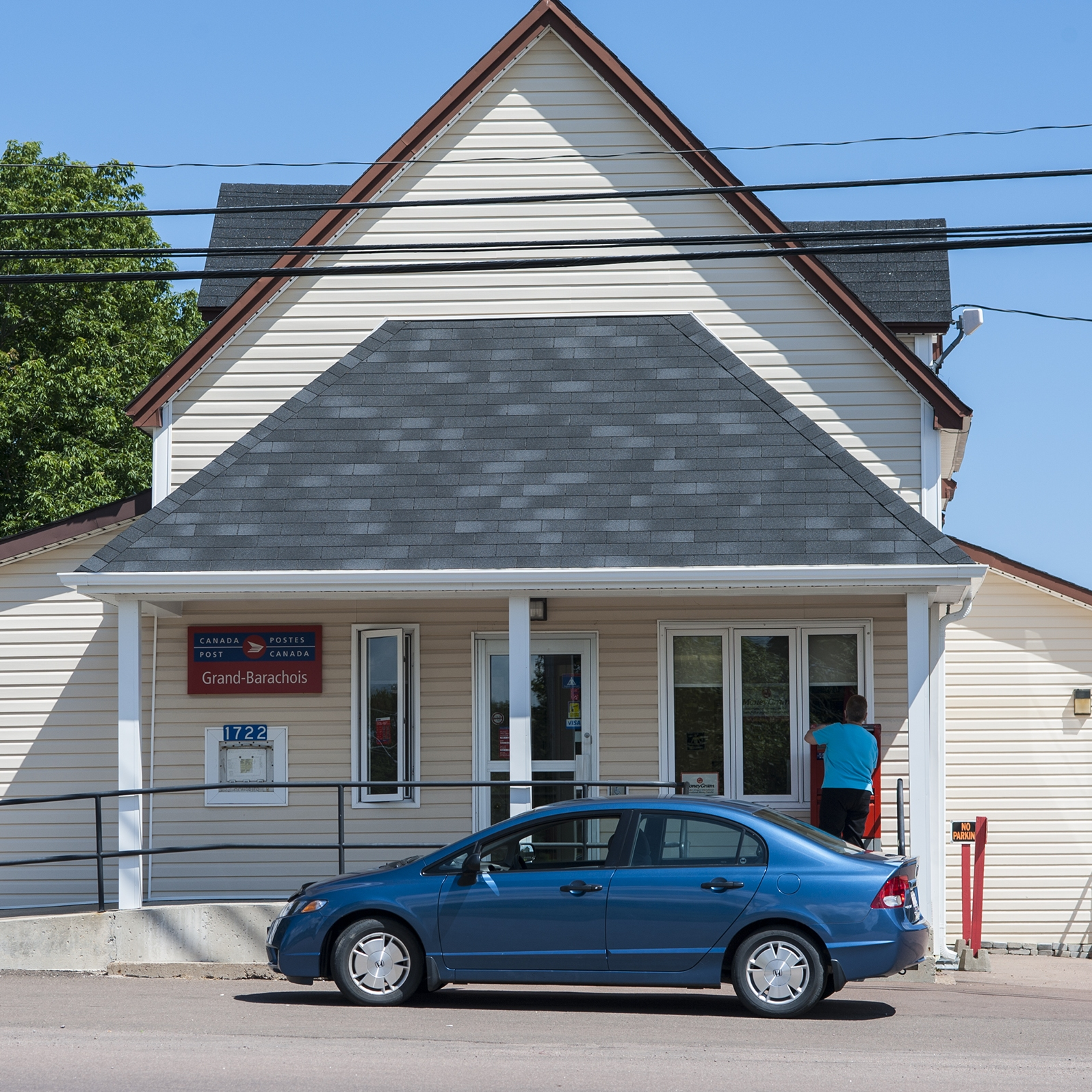
- Grand Barachois post office

- Location within New Brunswick
- Coordinates: 46°13′54″N 64°16′04″W
- Country: Canada
- Province: New Brunswick
- County: Westmorland
- Regional service commission: Southeast
- Incorporated: January 1, 2023

Government
  - Type: Town council
  - Mayor: Serge Leger
- Time zone: UTC-4 (AST)
  - Summer (DST): UTC-3 (ADT)
- Postal code(s): E4N
- Area code: 506

Cap-Acadie is a town in the Canadian province of New Brunswick. It was formed through the 2023 New Brunswick local governance reforms.

== Geography ==
It is located on the Northumberland Strait approximately 50 kilometres (30 miles) east of Moncton. Approximately 88% of its residents are Francophone.

== History ==
Cap-Acadie was incorporated on January 1, 2023, via the amalgamation of the former rural community of Beaubassin East and the former village of Cap-Pélé.

== Aboiteau Beach ==
Cap-Acadie is home to the well known Aboiteau Beach that stretches out for approximately 2.5 kilometres (1½ miles), located inside Aboiteau Park. The beachside complex offers many services including a licensed restaurant with seafood and bar service, a gift shop and a patio overlooking the strait.

== See also ==
- List of communities in New Brunswick
- List of municipalities in New Brunswick
