= Shemogue, New Brunswick =

Community in New Brunswick, Canada

Coordinates: 46.150°N 64.183°W

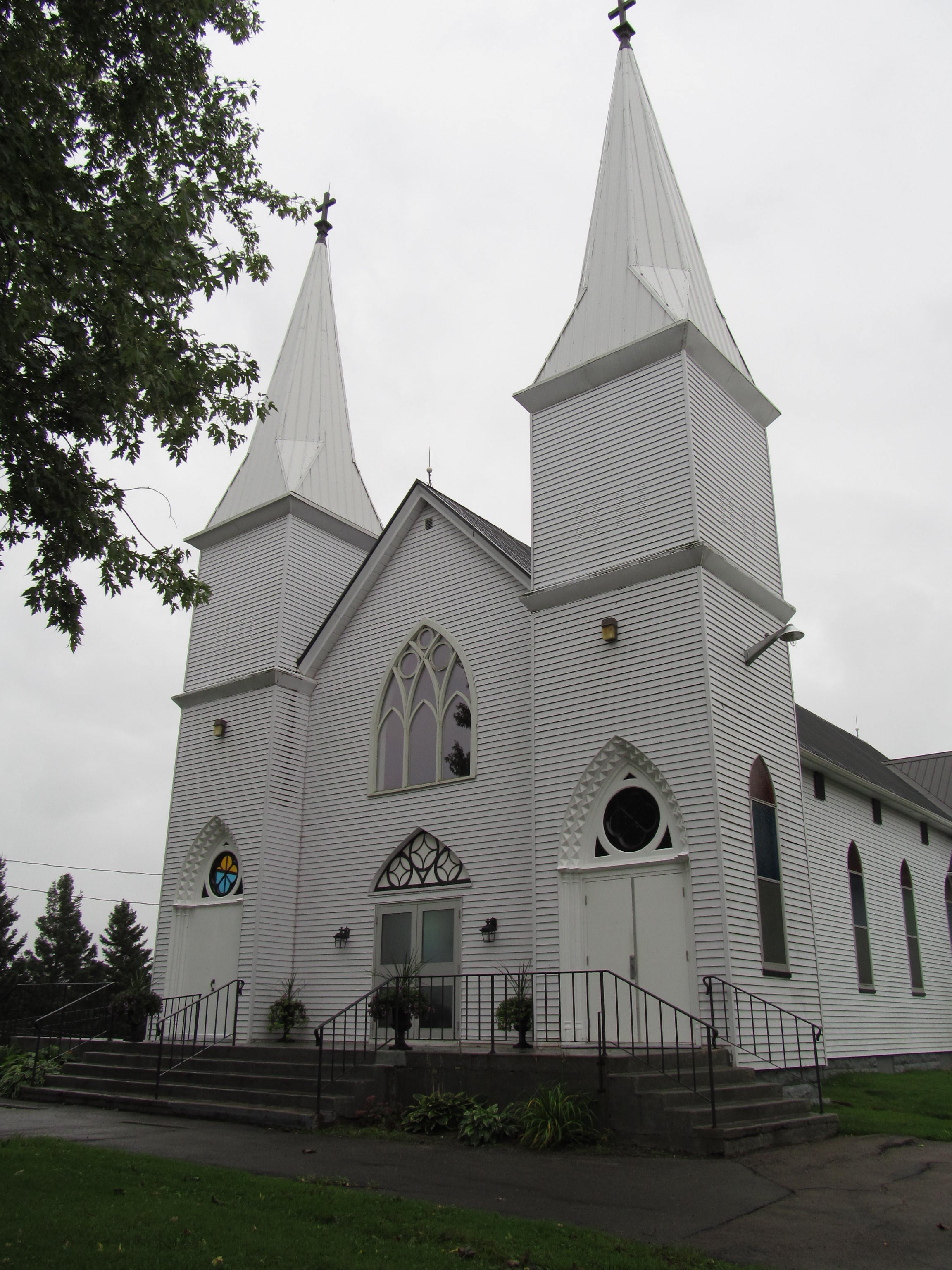
Saint-Timothy church in Shemogue

Shemogue is a community in the town of Cap-Acadie in the Canadian province of New Brunswick.

== History ==
Shemogue, originally called Chimougoüi and later Great Shemogue, was first settled prior to the Acadian Expulsion, however all families living there were deported to the Carolinas, and the area wasn't resettled until 1804 by Acadians from Minudie. By the 1870s, the community was a thriving lumber and fishing community with a population of 300. By 1898, Shemogue was home to 500 people, a flour mill, a hotel, 3 stores, 2 churches, and more. Many of these structures were abandoned or demolished over the next century.

In 2006, Shemogue was amalgamated into the rural community of Beaubassin East. In 2023, Beaubassin East, including Shemogue, was amalgamated into the town of Cap-Acadie.

== See also ==
- List of communities in New Brunswick
