= Haute-Aboujagane, New Brunswick =

Community in New Brunswick, Canada

Coordinates: 46°9′2.8″N 64°24′3.1″W

Haute-Aboujagane is a small Canadian community in Westmorland County, New Brunswick. Formerly a local service district, it was later part of the rural community of Beaubasin East.

Situated inland from the Northumberland Strait near Shediac, the community is also called La Ha by locals. It is connected to the village of Memramcook via Route 933, a dirt road.

== Demographics ==
In the 2021 Census of Population conducted by Statistics Canada, Haute Aboujagane had a population of 982 living in 399 of its 409 total private dwellings, a change of 0.8% from its 2016 population of 974. With a land area of 77.81 km^{2} (30.04 sq mi), it had a population density of 12.6/km^{2} (32.7/sq mi) in 2021.

== See also ==
- Greater Shediac
- List of communities in New Brunswick
