= Shediac =

- Town
- Downtown

- Seal Coat of arms
- Nickname: Lobster Capital of the World
- Motto: "In Unum Ad Summum" (Latin) "Together Toward The Heights
- Location within New Brunswick
- Coordinates: 46°13′N 64°32′W
- Country: Canada
- Province: New Brunswick
- County: Westmorland County
- Parish: Shédiac Parish
- Founded: 18th century
- Incorporated: 1903

Government
  - Type: Town Council
  - Mayor: Patricia Bourque-Chevarie
  - Governing Body: Shediac Town Council

Area
  - Land: 64.00 km^{2} (24.71 sq mi)
- Highest elevation: 33 m (108 ft)
- Lowest elevation: 0 m (0 ft)

Population (2021)
  - Total: 7,535
  - Density: 117.7/km^{2} (305/sq mi)
  - Change (2016–21): ▲13.1%
- Time zone: UTC-4 (Atlantic (AST))
  - Summer (DST): UTC-3 (ADT)
- Canadian Postal code: E4P
- Area code: 506
- Telephone Exchange: 312 351 530 531 532 533
- NTS Map: 21I2 Moncton
- GNBC Code: DACUC
- Highways Route 11 Route 15: Route 132; Route 133; Route 140
- Website: www.shediac.ca

Shediac (official name in both French and English; Shédiac is colloquial French) is a town in Westmorland County, New Brunswick known as the "Lobster Capital of the World". It hosts an annual festival every July which promotes its ties to lobster fishing. At the western entrance to the town is a 90-ton sculpture called The World's Largest Lobster. It is believed that chiac, a well-known Acadian French patois, was named after Shediac.

Since its founding it has expanded several times, most recently in 2023, when it annexed all or part of four local service districts. Revised census figures have not been released.

== Etymology ==
Shediac was originally called La Batture. Its name was later changed to Shediac in reference to its position at the basin of the Shediac River. The name "Shediac" itself is derived from the Mi'kmaq word Esedeiik, which means "which comes from far away", possibly in reference to the Shediac Bay or the current of the Petitcodiac river.

== Geography ==
Shediac is situated primarily on Route 133 around Shediac Bay, a sub-basin of the Northumberland Strait.

Its topography is relatively flat and its soil is mostly composed of sedimentary rocks dating from the Pennsylvanian. Shediac enjoys a continental climate.

The town is located southwest and adjacent to the community of Pointe-du-Chêne, once the eastern terminus of the European and North American Railway as well as a stopover for Pan-Am's transatlantic "clipper" air service featuring large seaplanes. Imperial Airways' flying boat service to Foynes in Ireland also used the facilities.

== History ==
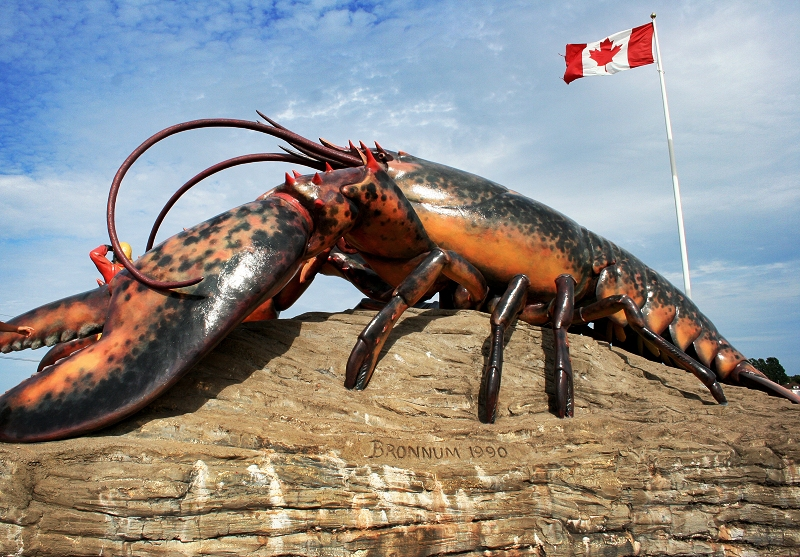
Lobster sculpture

Hundreds of years ago, the Mi'kmaq encampment of "Es-ed-ei-ik" was one of the major camps in southeast New Brunswick. The Mi'kmaq word Es-ed-ei-ik, which means "running far in", in reference to its position where the coastline turns between running north-south and east-west, eventually transformed into Gédaique. Acadians first arrived at Shediac in 1751 as a result of the Acadian Exodus from peninsular Nova Scotia. During the French and Indian War, French officer Charles Deschamps de Boishebert made his headquarters at both Shediac and Cocagne, New Brunswick. In the autumn of 1755, Boishebert established himself on the south shore of Cocagne Bay, a place known as Boishebert's Camp. The following year, Boishebert moved to Miramichi, New Brunswick, specifically to Beaubears Island. After the war, Acadians returned to the region in 1767. Today many francophones use the spelling Shédiac; however, the town's name upon its incorporation did not feature an accented "e", and correspondingly the official geographic name for the community is Shediac.

View of Shediac about 1906

== Shediac Bay Yacht Club ==
Shediac Bay Yacht Club is on the Register of 'Canada's Historic Places' for being the location of a local wharf for nearly a century. The previous Shediac Bay Yacht Club House was designed by Roméo Savoie.

== Employment ==
One of the largest employers is the Southeast Regional Correctional Centre, which was designed for a staff of 107 people. Another major employer is the Public Service Pension Centre.

Many Shediac residents commute to Moncton for work.

== Demography ==
In the 2021 Census of Population conducted by Statistics Canada, Shediac had a population of 7,535 living in 3,293 of its 3,447 total private dwellings, a change of 13.1% from its 2016 population of 6,664. With a land area of 64 km^{2} (25 sq mi), it had a population density of 117.7/km^{2} (304.9/sq mi) in 2021.

Historical population
Year	Pop.	±%
1901	1,075	—
1911	1,442	+34.1%
1921	1,973	+36.8%
1931	1,883	−4.6%
1941	2,147	+14.0%
1951	2,010	−6.4%
1961	2,159	+7.4%
1981	4,289	+98.7%
1986	4,370	+1.9%
1991	4,343	−0.6%
1996	4,664	+7.4%
2001	4,892	+4.9%
2006	5,497	+12.4%
2011	6,053	+10.1%
2016	6,664	+10.1%
2021	7,535	+13.1%

Income (2015)

Income type	By CAD
Median Total income per capita	$31,067
Median Household Income	$57,203
Median Family Income	$76,373

Mother tongue (2016)

Language	Population	Pct (%)
French	4,435	71.0%
English	1,450	23.2%
English and French	150	2.4%
Other languages	215	3.4%

== Notable people ==
- Georges-Antoine Belcourt (1803–1874), missionary
- Edna May Williston Best (1880–1923), feminist
- Emile Duprée (1936–2023), former professional wrestler and promoter
- René Duprée (1983 – ), professional wrestler, former WWE wrestler, son of Émile Dupree
- Muriel McQueen Fergusson (1899–1987), Canadian senator
- Gord Gallant (1950 – ), professional hockey player
- Placide Gaudet (1850–1930), journalist, historian
- Daniel Lionel Hanington (1835–1909), former Premier of New Brunswick
- Rosa Laricchiuta (1974 – ), professional singer
- Joseph E. Leblanc (1916–1979), politician
- Samuel Lee (1756–1805), judge, politician
- Anna Malenfant (1905–1988), singer, educator and composer
- Edward R. McDonald (1872–1952), lawyer, politician, mayor, inventor of the Crossword Game, 1926
- Olivier-Maximin Melanson (1854–1926), Acadian businessman and politician
- Chiquita Mére (1994 – ), drag queen
- A. P. Paterson (1870–1957), politician
- Scott Pellerin (b. 1970), former professional hockey player
- Pascal Poirier (1852–1933), writer, lawyer, senator
- Jean George Robichaud (1883–1969), politician
- Ferdinand-Joseph Robidoux (1875–1962), lawyer, politician
- Wes Sheridan (1960-), Canadian politician
- Albert James Smith (1822–1883), former Premier of New Brunswick
- Ernest A. Smith (1864 – 1952), Canadian politician
- Elsie Wayne (1932–2016), politician
- John Clarence Webster (1862–1950), physician, historian

== Sister city ==
- Breaux Bridge, Louisiana since 1970

== See also ==
- List of lighthouses in New Brunswick
- List of communities in New Brunswick
- Media in Moncton
- Greater Moncton
- Greater Shediac
- HMCS Shediac

== Bibliography ==
- Cormier, Yves; Poisson, Esther, eds. (2009). Dictionnaire du français acadien [Dictionary of Acadian French] (in French). Montréal: Fides. ISBN 978-2-7621-3010-2.
- Rayburn, Alan (1975). Geographical Names of New Brunswick. Ottawa: Surveys and Mapping Branch, Department of Energy, Mines and Resources.
- Webster, John Clarence (1953). A history of Shediac, New Brunswick. Saint John, New Brunswick: New Brunswick Museum.
- Rand, Silas Tertius (1875). A First Reading Book in the Micmac Language: Comprising the Micmac Numerals, and the Names of the Different Kinds of Beasts, Birds, Fishes, Trees, &c. of the Maritime Provinces of Canada. Also, Some of the Indian Names of Places, and Many Familiar Words and Phrases, Translated Literally Into English. Halifax, Nova Scotia: Nova Scotia Printing Company.
