= Cap-Pelé, New Brunswick =

Cap-Pelé
- Motto: « Au coeur de l’Acadie »
- Location within New Brunswick
- Coordinates: 46.23176°N 64.26775°W
- Country: Canada
- Province: New Brunswick
- County: Westmorland County
- Town: Cap-Acadie
- Incorporated: 1969

Area
  - Total: 22.96 km^{2} (8.86 sq mi)

Population (2021)
  - Total: 2,441
  - Density: 106.3/km^{2} (275/sq mi)
  - Change 2016-2021: ▲0.7%
- Time zone: UTC-4 (Atlantic (AST))
  - Summer (DST): UTC-3 (ADT)
- Canadian Postal code: E4N
- Area code: 506
- Website: www.cap-pele.com

Cap-Pelé ([kap pəle]) is a former village in Westmorland County, New Brunswick, Canada. It held village status prior to 2023 and is now part of the town of Cap-Acadie.

The community centres on the intersection of Route 945 and Route 133 but extends to Route 950.

Its sister city is Broussard, Louisiana, United States.

== Geography ==
It is located on the Northumberland Strait approximately 50 kilometres (30 miles) east of Moncton. Approximately 88% of its residents are Francophone.

== History ==
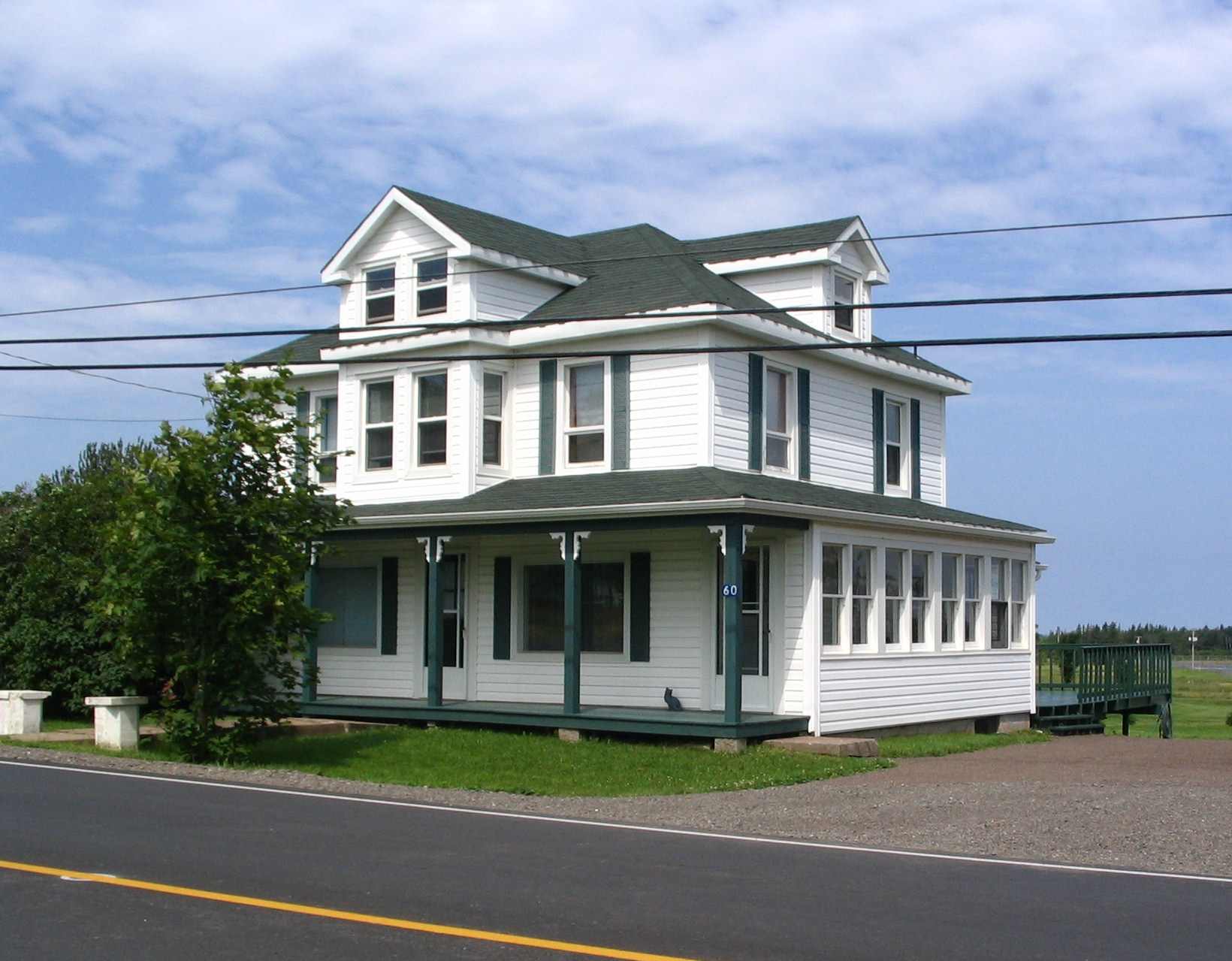
House in Cap-Pelé

The village was founded by Acadians in 1780 and incorporated as a municipality in 1969. Fishing is the dominant industry, and the town is home to several smoked herring processing plants known locally as boucannières. As many as 30 smokehouses are found in Cap-Pelé and its surrounding areas. Work in the smokehouses tends to be seasonal, and during the summertime certain smokehouses offer guided tours.

The post office's name was changed from Cape Bald to Cap-Pelé by petition of local residents in 1949. The name was approved on March 2, 1950.

On 1 January 2023, Cap-Pelé amalgamated with the incorporated rural community of Beaubassin East to form the new town of Cap-Acadie. The community's name remains in official use.

== Aboiteau Beach ==
Cap-Pelé is home to the well known Aboiteau Beach that stretches out for approximately 2.5 kilometres (1½ miles), located inside Aboiteau Park. The beachside complex offers many services including a licensed restaurant with seafood and bar service, a gift shop and a patio overlooking the strait.

== Demographics ==
Historical Census Data Cap-Pelé, New Brunswick
Year	Pop.	±%
2006	2,279	—
2011	2,256	−1.0%
2016	2,425	+7.5%
2021	2,441	+0.7%

In the 2021 Census of Population conducted by Statistics Canada, Cap-Pelé had a population of 2,441 living in 1,011 of its 1,144 total private dwellings, a change of 0.7% from its 2016 population of 2,425. With a land area of 22.96 km^{2} (8.86 sq mi), it had a population density of 106.3/km^{2} (275.4/sq mi) in 2021.

Income (2016)

Income type	By CAD
Median total income (per capita)	$29,632
Median total Household income	$64,608
Median Family income	$79,147

Mother tongue (2016)

Language	Population	Pct (%)
French	1,795	76.5%
English	355	15.2%
Other languages	170	7.2%
English and French	25	1.1%

== See also ==
- List of communities in New Brunswick
