= Beaubassin East, New Brunswick =

Beaubassin East Beaubassin-est
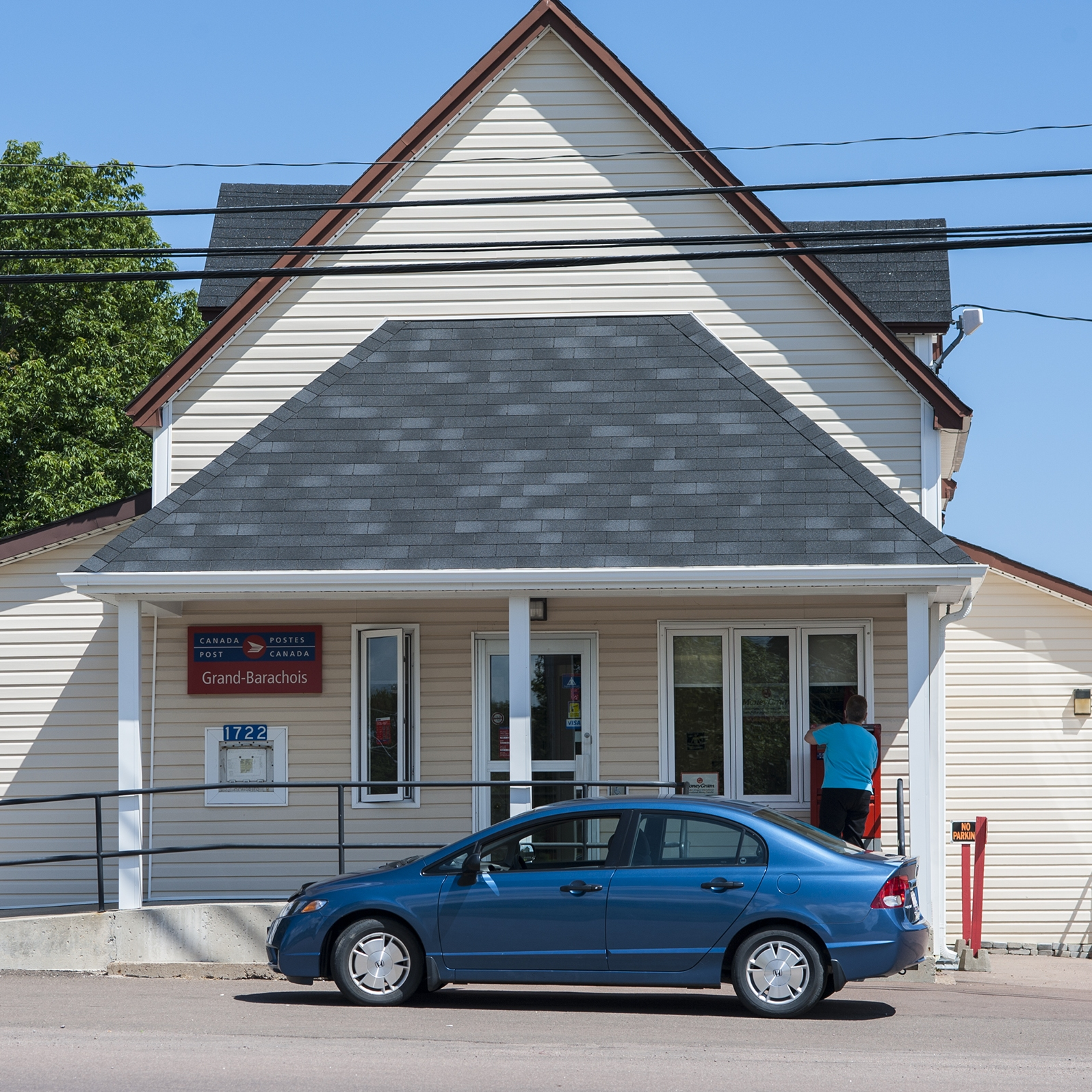
- Beaubassin East (Grand Barachois) post office

- Location of Beaubassin East in Canada Beaubassin East (New Brunswick)
- Coordinates: 46°10′21.2″N 64°18′43.8″W
- Country: Canada
- Province: New Brunswick
- County: Westmorland County
- Town: Cap-Acadie
- Incorporated: 8 May 1995
- Amalgamated: 1 January 2023

Area
  - Land: 291.02 km^{2} (112.36 sq mi)

Population (2021)
  - Total: 6,718
  - Density: 23.1/km^{2} (60/sq mi)
  - Change 2016-2021: ▲5.4%
- Time zone: UTC-4 (AST)
  - Summer (DST): UTC-3 (ADT)

Beaubassin East was an incorporated rural community in Westmorland County, New Brunswick, Canada. It held rural community status prior to 2023 and is now part of the town of Cap-Acadie.

== History ==
The rural community was incorporated on May 8, 1995 from the Local Service Districts of Boudreau West, Grand Barachois, Haute-Aboujagane, and Saint-André & LeBlanc Office, and portions of the parishes of Botsford, Sackville, and Shediac. It completely surrounded the village of Cap-Pelé.

Beaubassin East was divided into six wards, numbered counterclockwise from its eastern boundary.

1. Ward 1 included Bas-Cap-Pelé, Petit-Cap, Portage, and Shemogue
2. Ward 2 included Saint-André-LeBlanc
3. Ward 3 included Grand-Barachois
4. Ward 4 included Boudreau-Ouest
5. Ward 5 included Haute-Aboujagane
6. Ward 6 included Cormier-Village

In 2006, Trois-Ruisseaux became part of Beaubassin East.

On 1 January 2023, Beaubassin East amalgamated with Cap-Pelé to form the new town of Cap-Acadie. The constituent communities' names remain in official use.

== Demographics ==
In the 2021 Census of Population conducted by Statistics Canada, Beaubassin East had a population of 6,718 living in 2,855 of its 3,368 total private dwellings, a change of 5.4% from its 2016 population of 6,376. With a land area of 291.02 km^{2} (112.36 sq mi), it had a population density of 23.1/km^{2} (59.8/sq mi) in 2021.

Canada census – Beaubassin East / Beaubassin-est community profile

	2021	2016	2011
Population	6,718 (+5.4% from 2016)	6,376 (+2.8% from 2011)	6,200 (-3.6% from 2006)
Land area	291.02 km^{2} (112.36 sq mi)	291.08 km^{2} (112.39 sq mi)	291.12 km^{2} (112.40 sq mi)
Population density	23.1/km^{2} (60/sq mi)	21.9/km^{2} (57/sq mi)	21.3/km^{2} (55/sq mi)
Median age	50.8 (M: 50.8, F: 50.8)	49.6 (M: 49.9, F: 49.4)
Private dwellings	3,368 (total) 2,855 (occupied)	3,388 (total)	3,296 (total)
Median household income	$82,000	$68,894

References: 2021 2016 2011

Canada 2016 Census		Population	% of Total Population
Visible minority group Source:	South Asian	0	0.2%
Visible minority group Source:	Chinese	10	0.2%
Visible minority group Source:	Black	0	0%
Visible minority group Source:	Filipino	40	0.6%
Visible minority group Source:	Latin American	25	0.4%
Visible minority group Source:	Arab	10	0.2%
Visible minority group Source:	Southeast Asian	10	0.2%
Visible minority group Source:	West Asian	0	0%
Visible minority group Source:	Korean	0	0%
Visible minority group Source:	Japanese	0	0%
Visible minority group Source:	Other visible minority	10	0.2%
Visible minority group Source:	Mixed visible minority	15	0.2%
Total visible minority population		115	1.8%
Aboriginal group Source:	First Nations	55	0.9%
Aboriginal group Source:	Métis	40	0.6%
Aboriginal group Source:	Inuit	10	0.2%
Aboriginal group Source:	Other Aboriginal	10	0.2%
Total Aboriginal population		115	1.8%
European		6,260	98.2%
Total population		6,376	100%

== See also ==
- List of rural communities in New Brunswick
- Greater Shediac
