= Westmorland Chemical Park =

Defunct industrial park in New Brunswick

Project
- Status: Closed

Location
- Industrial park
- Interactive map of Westmorland Chemical Park
- Coordinates: 45°52′11″N 64°32′36″W
- Location: Dorchester Cape, New Brunswick, Canada

The Westmorland Chemical Park was an industrial park in Dorchester Cape, New Brunswick, Canada. The main facility was an ammonium nitrate production plant that operated from late 1965 until its closure in late 1968.

The park was announced in 1964 by the government of New Brunswick under Premier Louis Robichaud and was one of several major public works projects that aimed to increase industrial development in the province. The location of Dorchester Cape was chosen in part to benefit Westmorland County, a Liberal Association stronghold that was one of the most economically depressed areas of the province. Additionally, its location along the Bay of Fundy would allow for oceanic shipping and receiving at the plant via a floating dock. While the government would initially operate the plant, it would eventually sell it to a private company. While the initial project called for an ammonium nitrate plant, it was hoped that this investment would spur further development in the area. Groundbreaking occurred on October 31, 1964.

Prior to its opening, New Brunswick industrialist K. C. Irving criticized the project as being economically untenable and questioned the viability of shipping via the Bay of Fundy, which experiences some of the highest tidal ranges in the world. However, in November 1965, the plant, which was operated by the Fundy Chemical Corporation, received its first shipment of ammonia and production commenced. Within several months, however, the plant struggled to sell its product and by May 1966 it had completely shut down production. Production resumed later that year, but in early 1967, the floating dock was severely damaged, causing any shipments to be delivered via rail. By mid-1967, the government had begun to plan bankruptcy proceedings against the company, which was in default on government loans. Eventually, the government took over operations at the plant, but officially closed it in October 1968.

Following the plant's closure, Robichaud spoke publicly about its failure, calling it "a mistake" and "a blunder". Ultimately, equipment from the plant was sold to various companies, with Irving purchasing the floating dock. In total, the provincial government had invested about $10 million ($100 million in 2025) into the project in the form of land purchases, construction, and loans to various companies. By 1984, the area had been largely abandoned and overgrown, though a steel drainage pipe plant that had been built during the park's construction still remained in operation as of 2019.

== Background ==
=== Premier Robichaud and Operation Prosper ===
In 1960, Louis Robichaud, a member of the New Brunswick Liberal Association, became the premier of New Brunswick and initiated a series of policies aimed at reforming the province's economy and society. Among other things, this included a reform to the province's higher education system and an increase in investment in transportation infrastructure. In the 1963 New Brunswick general election held that April, Robichaud and the Liberals maintained power in a snap election based primarily on a campaign that focused on job growth, with an emphasis on promoting industrialization. As premier, Robichaud oversaw the establishment of the New Brunswick Development Corporation (NBDC), with chemical engineer Frederick J. Gormley appointed as its general manager in May 1963. In addition to running the corporation, which would oversee government projects, Gormley would also serve as an advisor to both Premier Robichaud and the Executive Council of New Brunswick.

Beginning in late 1963, Robichaud's government initiated "Operation Prosper", a term Gormley adopted to refer to the NBDC's initiatives. Over the next several years, Robichaud oversaw several major public works projects in the province, including the construction of the Mactaquac Dam along the Saint John River, the Centennial Bridge over the Miramichi River, a mine in Bathurst, a thermal power plant in Dalhousie, a pulp mill in South Nelson, and an oil refinery in Saint John. Around this same time, Canadian Industries Limited announced plans to open a new chemical plant in Dalhousie, and the provincial government also oversaw the creation of several industrial parks, including in Charlotte County and Greater Saint John. According to economist Herb Emery, these efforts also had the partial aim of helping to develop the southern part of the province, which lacked the natural resource base present in northern New Brunswick.

=== Announcement and planning ===
On June 11, 1964, Finance Minister Lestock Graham DesBrisay announced plans for the construction of a fertilizer production plant in Westmorland County. Per DesBrisay, the project would serve as Eastern Canada's first industrial park for the manufacturing of chemical products. It would be located at Dorchester Cape, approximately 35 kilometres (22 miles) south of Moncton, situated in a marshy area that jutted into the Bay of Fundy. (Note: While the industrial park would be located at Dorchester Cape, some sources refer to the nearby community of Dorchester when discussing the location.) The exact location had been determined by Gormley, who visited the site prior to its announcement. In total, the site covered 134 acres (54 hectares).

Per author Hal Fredericks, the first stage of the project called for a $4.5 million ($45.1 million in 2025) plant that was expected to produce 190 tons of ammonium nitrate and 150 tons of nitric acid daily. (Note: These figures come from a 2003 book by author Hal Fredericks. However, in a 1984 book, historian Della M. M. Stanley gives a significantly different figure of "seventy-two tons of ammonium nitrate annually".) Of this cost, a third was provided for by the Atlantic Development Board. The plant would receive its primary raw material, ammonia, from a W. R. Grace & Co. plant in Trinidad. Grace also signed on to oversee the facility's sales and supply management. Later chemicals planned to be produced at the complex included acetylene, formaldehyde, hydrochloric acid, lime, plastics, soda ash, sodium sulfate, and urea. While the government would create the plant and serve as its initial owners, it planned to eventually transfer ownership to the private sector. Additionally, there were plans for the later construction of a $3 million ($30 million in 2025) flint glass plant.

Robichaud was enthusiastic about the project. He believed that the plant would allow for farmers in New Brunswick to purchase fertilizer at a reasonable price, which would lead to more fertilizer usage and a higher crop yield. Robichaud also thought that the complex could attract other related businesses to the area, spurring further economic growth. Residents in the region had petitioned Robichaud's government for a job creation program that would help to revitalize the area around Moncton, and according to historian Della M. M. Stanley, the project was viewed by the government as a way of helping Westmorland County, which was historically a Liberal stronghold. The area was also one of the most economically depressed in the province, with the Dorchester Penitentiary serving as one of the only large economic bases. Planners expected the plant to employ about one hundred people permanently and about three hundred additional people on a part-time basis. The location was also considered favorable given its close proximity to the National Transcontinental Railway and the Trans-Canada Highway, and Dorchester Cape's location on the Bay of Fundy would allow for transportation via ship.

=== Concerns ===
However, Dorchester Cape's location posed several problems for developers. The Bay of Fundy experiences the highest tidal range in the world, and at Dorchester Cape, the water level could fluctuate by 20 metres (66 feet), presenting difficulties for transportation by sea. Additionally, the waters around the cape had an abundant amount of sediment due to its location at the confluence of both the Memramcook River and the Petitcodiac River with the bay. In June 1964, Fenco, a Montreal-based engineering firm, published their analysis of the site, where they concluded that the location was inadequate for anchorage of vessels greater than 5,000 tons. To address these issues, Gormley proposed that a floating dock be installed at the site, with designs from another Montreal-based firm, Canadian Bechtel.

Businessman K. C. Irving was also opposed to the plant, as he believed that it would directly compete against a fertilizer plant that he was developing in Belledune. Irving was also incredulous about the floating dock idea and concerned about the feasibility of transportation via the Bay of Fundy. During a meeting in Fredericton with Robichaud and DesBrisay, Irving discussed his opposition to the project, later telling a biographer that Robichaud had become irate with him, saying, "He got red in the face. He banged on the table. He was mad as a porcupine. He just raved on and on." While Robichaud denied Irving's account of the events, he nonetheless rejected Irving's concerns, as he believed that the project could be feasible and that Irving's opposition was primarily driven by his desire to control the fertilizer industry. Ultimately, the fertilizer plant would be one of several issues that arose between the premier and Irving during Robichaud's second term in office.

== Construction ==
On October 31, 1964, Robichaud presided over the groundbreaking for the fertilizer plant, during which he expressed his belief that the government had a responsibility in helping private industry to benefit the people. (Note: Sources vary on the exact phrasing used by Robichaud during the groundbreaking ceremony. In a 1984 book, historian Della M. M. Stanley quoted him as saying, "It is the function of government to assist and encourage the private sector in sound developments of lasting benefit to our people." However, in a 2004 book, journalist Michel Cormier (translated by Jonathan Kaplansky) quoted him as saying, "It is the duty of the government to help the private sector create benefits for the population.") Construction of the plant was performed by the Montreal-based Lummus Company of Canada Limited. Additionally, despite his objections to the project, Irving constructed the floating dock for the site, which weighed 7,000 tons. Production of the dock took place in nearby Chartersville and was underway by August 1965. On November 12 of that year, the dock was moved to Dorchester Cape via the Petitcodiac River and moored to the site. Officials named the dock the "Port of Moncton", hoping to capitalize on Moncton's greater name recognition compared to Dorchester Cape.

Construction of the initial plant proceeded smoothly, prompting the government of New Brunswick to sell the location sooner than initially planned. In March 1965, the NBDC announced that they had sold the land and partially completed facility to the Fundy Chemical Corporation, a subsidiary of the Border Chemical Company of Winnipeg, for about $5.3 million ($52 million in 2025). On April 30, Fundy Chemical's president announced that the plant would be in operation by November 1. By September 1965, over 500 workers were employed in the project, which had a monthly payroll of about $225,000 ($2.2 million in 2025). Of these workers, about 350 were residents of Westmorland County.

In total, the provincial government had invested about $10 million ($100 million in 2025) into the project, which had included the purchase of the land, the construction of the dock, and several loans made to companies that were involved. Over $8 million ($78 million in 2025) had been paid by the government to Lummus Company and the park's architects, which was over twice the initially planned amount. The government was planning on a further $60 million ($586 million in 2025) in investments from the private sector in the project.

=== Additional planned facilities ===
Aside from Fundy Chemical, several other companies expressed interest in the park. In early 1965, the company Havelock Lime Works announced that they intended to build a calcium factory at the site, with limestone to be shipped to the facility via a rail line funded by the NBDC. Construction of this plant was scheduled to begin in May 1965 and cost $750,000 ($7.33 million in 2025). In October 1965, Atlantic Industries announced plans to build a $400,000 ($3.91 million in 2025) plant to manufacture steel drainage pipes. This plant would commence operations in April 1966. Around October 1966, local newspapers reported on plans for the construction of two new plants that would produce sulphuric acid and urea.

== In operation ==
=== Initial shipment ===
Early in its operation, the facility experienced issues related to its floating dock. The captain of the ship that was transporting the first shipment of ammonia from Trinidad refused to use the floating dock and departed without unloading. The first successful delivery of ammonia occurred on November 25, 1965. However, the docking area was not fully completed at that time due to an issue in steel delivery, and as a result, a barge was moored between the dock and a nearby pier to allow for proper unloading. The ship, the 15,000-ton William Grace, slightly ran aground near the dock, but otherwise delivered ammonia without any major issues. Production on ammonium nitrate was expected to commence within ten days, with the ship expected to return in March 1966 to retrieve the finished product, though this return trip would ultimately not occur.

=== Early issues ===
While the facility had been under construction, Fundy Chemical had entered into a contract for the supply of ammonium for $59.60 ($582.52 in 2025) a ton, which was about ten dollars below the current market rate. However, in 1965, there were major developments in ammonia production that led to the creation of several new ammonia plants in North America and a drop in the price to about $35 to $45 ($342 to $440 in 2025) per ton, causing Fundy Chemical to severely overpay for their raw materials even before production began. In February 1966, it was discovered that the chemical company Monsanto could undersell Fundy Chemical by about $4 ($38 in 2025) per ton on fertilizer. Additionally, while Mobil Chemical had submitted a bid to the company for 30,000 tons of ammonium nitrate at $60 ($563 in 2025) per ton, the bid was ultimately canceled. That same month, the company discovered that England would not allow the importation of ammonium nitrate due to its possible use as an explosive, thus removing that as a possible market for the plant's product. This followed an earlier discovery in 1965 that neither India nor Pakistan would allow for the use of ammonium nitrate fertilizer either. By April, almost all of Europe, along with the Middle East and Australia, were deemed as impossible markets for the product. As a result, Fundy Chemical began to explore Tunisia and South America as possible new markets.

By April 1966, the Fundy Chemical Corporation employed 53 individuals at the fertilizer plant. However, by May 1, the plant experienced a complete shutdown of fertilizer production, and by mid-May, only 21 people remained employed. That day, due to questions from the province's parliamentary opposition, the government stated that the shutdown was only temporary and had been caused by "marketing problems" and a lack of storage space for ammonia. Meanwhile, the company said that the workforce reduction was caused by a lack of sales, with a stockpile of fertilizer beginning to accumulate at the facility. While the shutdown would last until June, the government noted that small deliveries of fertilizer from the plant were being made to markets across Canada via rail. By July, there was still no fertilizer being produced at the plant, but people were employed in maintenance and other projects at the facility.

=== End of 1966 through 1967 ===
In August 1966, Fundy Chemical submitted bids to several countries, including Algeria, Greece, and Syria, for purchasing their ammonium nitrate, though these bids were ultimately withdrawn by the company due to issues with the facility's docking system. However, in October, the company announced that they had deals in place to sell the entirety of their next year's production, with a majority going to locations throughout Canada and some being sold overseas. However, the specifics of these deals were kept private by the company. Around the same time, on October 10, the company began work on creating a blasting agent, formed through the mixing of ammonium nitrate and fuel oil. In the company's annual financial report for 1966, they stated that they had lost $13 million ($122 million in 2025) in operating costs at the plant. Additionally, the company was not planning to make payments on the interest it owed to the provincial government in 1967, with no plans to make payments on the principal until January 1968.

On December 15, 1966, the 9,950-ton ship Joseph P. Grace docked at the facility's wharf and unloaded 2,000 tons of liquid ammonia. It departed the following day for Trinidad and was scheduled to return the following month to unload more ammonia and to pick up a load of blasting agent that was destined for Peru. Around the same time, the plant shipped about 1,500 tons of ammonium nitrate to Saint John by rail.

=== Damages to the wharf ===
Following damage to the dock in 1967, ammonia was transported by rail from Saint John to Dorchester Cape.

By January 1967, people noticed a large crack beginning to form on the section of the wharf where it connected to land. Tidal action had caused the ground beneath the barge to wash away and, as a result, the barge's hull suffered some damage. As a result, the dock was temporarily closed for repairs, having accepted only two ships up to that time. In the meantime, ammonia was transported to the facility via rail from Saint John, with the provincial government covering these transportation costs. Outbound shipments would also be carried by rail.

On February 25, an ice flow on the Memramcook River, combined with high tides and strong winds to break the floating dock free of its connections to the cape. This occurred during a strong storm in the area, and ultimately the pontoon structure was found several hundred yards upriver from the facility. In March, the structure was towed to Saint John for repairs and storage. It was returned to the facility in May. Around this same time, NBDC began to solicit bids to dredge the area near the dock, as engineers who worked on the dock believed that a larger berthing area would resolve some of the issues associated with the structure.

=== Layoffs, financial losses, and bankruptcy ===
In April 1967, Charles Van Horne, the leader of the Progressive Conservative Party of New Brunswick, demanded that a government investigation be undertaken into NBDC projects, which would have included the Westmorland facility, though this did not come to fruition. Around that same time, the plant ceased production due to an inability to sell its ammonium nitrate. At this time, the plant employed 56 people, with about half fired. In an attempt to cover its escalating operating costs, the company sold its product domestically at a reduced price.

On May 29, the Joseph P. Grace was scheduled to dock at the Port of Moncton in order to unload ammonia and pick up a shipment of ammonium nitrate. At the time, Fundy Chemical had a verbal agreement with the ammonia supplier that ships would only dock at the facility during high tide and would leave when the tide began to ebb, repeating this process until the loading or unloading had been completed. However, this arrangement had not been communicated to the ship's captain. After docking, soundings showed that the ship was at risk of grounding, and following an issue with unloading the ammonia due to connection issues with the piping, he departed and instead docked at Saint John, where the ammonia was unloaded. This was the last attempt to dock at the Port of Moncton, and following this, dredging efforts ceased.

In June, government officials estimated that they would recoup only about $5 million ($45 million in 2025) of the money that had been invested into the project. Additionally, the arrears owed by the company on interest payments alone had risen to $270,000 ($2.45 million in 2025) by that time. (Note: This value comes from a 1984 book by historian Della M. M. Stanley. However, in a 2004 book by journalist Michel Cormier (translated by Jonathan Kaplansky), the value is given as "a quarter of a million dollars".) In private, Robichaud expressed his belief that the project was heading towards bankruptcy. In mid-1967, government officials drew up plans for the plant's foreclosure, though Robichaud and other officials, included DesBrisay, decided to withhold a public announcement of this until after the 1967 New Brunswick general election, which were scheduled for that October.

On November 9, 1967, the government commenced bankruptcy proceedings, with NBDC initiating the process of foreclosing on the Fundy Chemical Corporation over a default of payments on its mortgage. In December, the plant was put up for sale at an auction, where it was purchased by Westmorland Fertilizers for $4.4 million ($40 million in 2025). Westmorland Fertilizers—the sole bidder—had been created by NBDC to continue to operate the plant until a later buyer could be found. Westmorland Fertilizers rehired all of the previous workers and attempted to revive production, but was unsuccessful in finding potential markets. Studies were performed on possible improvements to the facility, though all were considered prohibitively expensive, and the company had difficulties finding a new buyer, ultimately closing the plant on October 25, 1968. By the end of 1967, Fundy Chemical had reported operating costs of about $500,000 ($5 million in 2025). In total, the government had lent the company approximately $5 million ($45 million in 2025) for costs related to the project.

== Aftermath ==
Following the plant's closure, Irving purchased the floating dock. According to a 2019 article published in the Westmorland County Historical Society's newsletter, he purchased the structure for $1 and it is still in use in one of his projects. In 1974, Baker Industries Corporation, a Connecticut-based company, paid $600,000 ($3.76 million in 2025) for the equipment present at the facility, which they dismantled and relocated to their factories in the United States. Meanwhile, the Havelock Lime Works facility was never constructed, while the Atlantic Industries steel plant was still in operation as of 2019. However, by 1984, much of the area had become overgrown, having largely been abandoned after the ammonium nitrate plant's closure. Robichaud later publicly called the project "a mistake", and in discussing the project several years later, he said,

In the final analysis, K. C. Irving was right. It was a failure. Gormley felt strongly about it, and he was wrong. But the whole cabinet agreed to go ahead despite Irving's objections. I later told the legislature I wasn't happy to admit it, but I did: it was a blunder.

== Sources ==
- Cormier, Michel (2004). Louis J. Robichaud: A Not So Quiet Revolution [Louis Robichaud: une révolution si peu tranquille] (in French). Translated by Jonathan Kaplansky (Translated ed.). Moncton: Faye Editions. ISBN 978-2-921824-30-9. OCLC 65389023.
- Emery, Herb (October 31, 2020). "Wither the North". University of New Brunswick. JDI Roundtable on Manufacturing Competitiveness in New Brunswick. Archived from the original on August 7, 2022.
- Fredericks, H. A. (2003). What Happened to the Blueprint for Atlantic Advance?:The Leaders and Followers, the Politicians, the Experts and Promoters. Fredericton: HLG Marketing. ISBN 978-0-9734984-0-0. OCLC 54542966.
- Goodrich, Gene (June 2019). Goodrich, Gene (ed.). "The Worst Laid Plans of Mice and Men: The Sorry Saga of the Westmorland Chemical Park" (PDF). Newsletter. Vol. 54, no. 2. Researched by Jamie Heap. Dorchester, New Brunswick: Westmorland Historical Society. pp. 2–9. ISSN 0382-0831. OCLC 1080293330. Archived (PDF) from the original on July 4, 2024.
- How, Douglas; Costello, Ralph (1993). K.C.: The Biography of K.C. Irving. Toronto: Key Porter Books. ISBN 978-1-55013-620-3. OCLC 745931044.
- Stanley, Della M. M. (1984). Louis Robichaud: A Decade of Power. Halifax, Nova Scotia: Nimbus Publishing. ISBN 978-0-920852-24-8. OCLC 11291018.
