= Get Lost =

Get Lost may refer to:

- Getting lost, an occurrence of losing spatial reference; losing one's way

== Albums ==
- Get Lost (Huntingtons album) (1999)
- Get Lost (The Magnetic Fields album) (1995)
- Get Lost, by Mark McGuire (2012)

== Songs ==
- "Get Lost" (Icona Pop song) (2014)
- "Get Lost", by Patrick Wolf from The Magic Position (2007)
- "Get Lost", by Kanye West from Donda 2 (2022)
- "(I) Get Lost", by Eric Clapton (1999)

== Other uses ==
- Get Lost (film), a 1956 Woody Woodpecker cartoon short subject
- Get Lost (organisation), an anti-war charity assisting Russians in evading conscription and desertion
- Get Lost!, a 1981 British television drama serial
- Get Lost Magazine, a travel magazine
- Getting Lost, a 2022 memoir by Annie Ernaux

== See also ==
- Get Lost, Find Yourself, an album by Chunk! No, Captain Chunk! (2015)
