= 2022 Nobel Prize in Literature =

Award

- Annie Ernaux
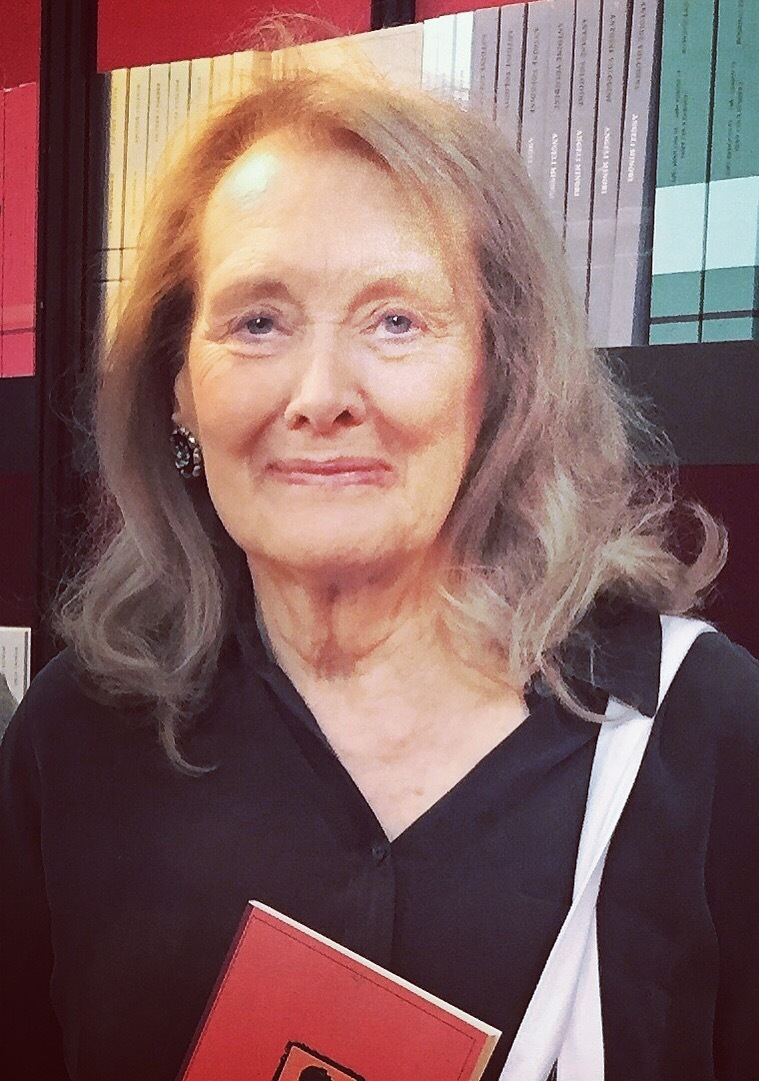
- "for the courage and clinical acuity with which she uncovers the roots, estrangements and collective restraints of personal memory"
- Date: 6 October 2022 (announcement); 10 December 2022 (ceremony)
- Location: Stockholm, Sweden
- Presented by: Swedish Academy
- Website: Official website

The 2022 Nobel Prize in Literature was awarded to the French author Annie Ernaux (born 1940) "for the courage and clinical acuity with which she uncovers the roots, estrangements and collective restraints of personal memory". It was announced by the Swedish Academy on 6 October 2022. Ernaux was the 16th French writer – the first Frenchwoman – and the 17th female author, to receive the Nobel Prize in Literature.

== Laureate ==
Ernaux started her literary career in 1974 with Les Armoires vides ("Cleaned Out"), an autobiographical novel. Very early in her career, she turned away from fiction to focus on autobiography, combining historic and individual experiences. In her different viewpoints, she consistently examines a life marked by strong disparities regarding gender, language and class. Her path to authorship was long and arduous, and all her oeuvres are written in plain language. Her books are followed by a wide readership, and are reviewed in most local and national newspapers in France, as well as being the subject of many radio and television interviews and programmes, and a large and growing international academic literature. Her famous works include La Place ("A Man's Place", 1983), L'événement ("Happening", 2000), Se perdre ("Getting Lost", 2001), L'Occupation ("The Possession", 2002), and Les Années ("The Years", 2008).

== Candidates ==
According to the site Nicer Odds, who compile odds from various betting sites, favourites to be awarded the 2022 Nobel Prize in Literature days before the announcement included Annie Ernaux as the fifth favourite with a 12/1 odds to win the prize, behind the French writer Michel Houellebecq and Indian-born British-American novelist Salman Rushdie with 7/1 and 8/1 odds respectively, and Kenyan Ngugi Wa Thiong’o and American Stephen King at jointly 10/1 odds. Perennial favourites to win the prize in 2022 included Canadians Margaret Atwood and Anne Carson, Japanese Haruki Murakami, Antigua-American Jamaica Kincaid, French-Guadeloupe Maryse Condé, Norwegian Jon Fosse (awarded in 2023), Hungarian Péter Nádas, Romanian Mircea Cărtărescu, Russian Lyudmila Ulitskaya, Spanish Javier Marías, American Don DeLillo and Chinese Can Xue.

== Prize announcement ==
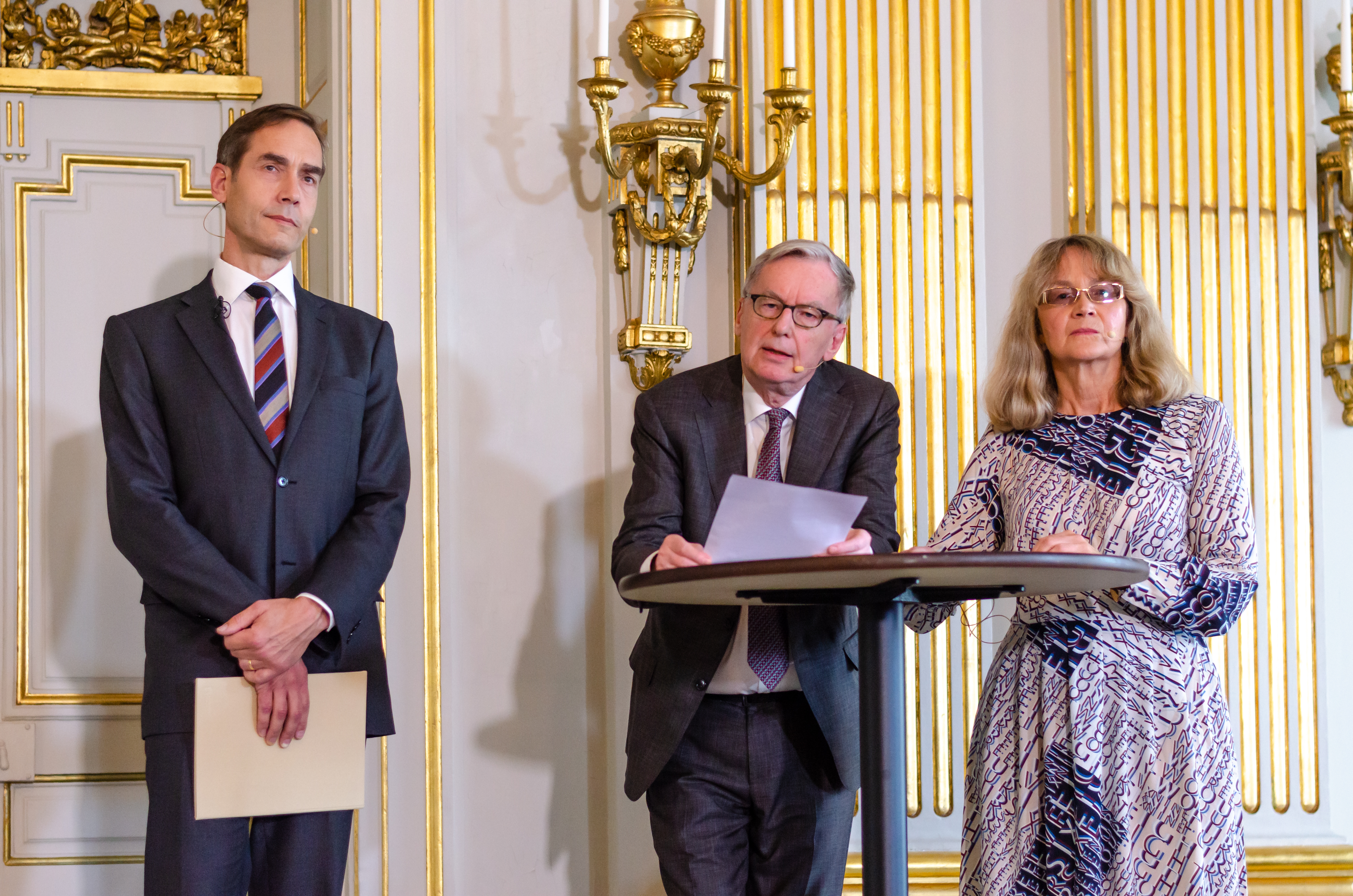
Committee chair Anders Olsson explaining Annie Ernaux's qualities of being the 2022 Nobel laureate with Committee member Ellen Mattson and Permanent Secretary Mats Malm.

Following the announcement, Carin Klaesson interviewed Nobel Committee chairman Anders Olsson. Asked why Ernaux was the 2022 laureate in Literature, he gave the following statement:

"She's a wonderful writer. She has really renewed literature in many ways. On one hand, I mean, she has her foot in the French tradition, the heritage of Marcel Proust, and these kinds of search for the roots of her experience in childhood and so forth that are very important for her. But also she guides these search in a quite new direction and in a more social context, and that is a wonderful inner portraits of appearance for instance. She gives also back these heritage, of these poor and ambitious people living in the countryside, and she does it with so clear, a certain look that is unwavering. It's a very strong prose, both brief and uncompromising at the same time."

== Reactions ==
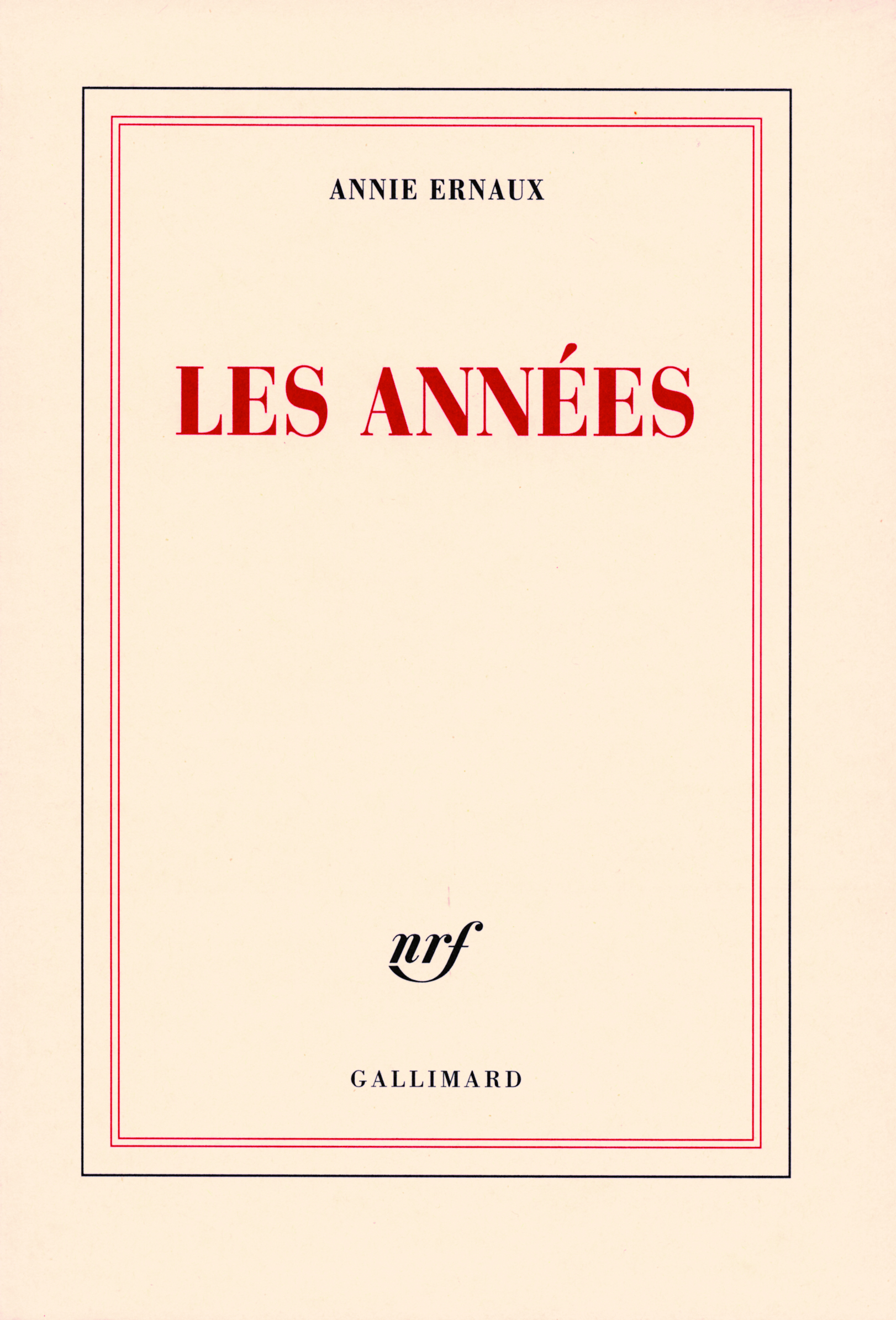
Ernaux's memoir Les années (2008).

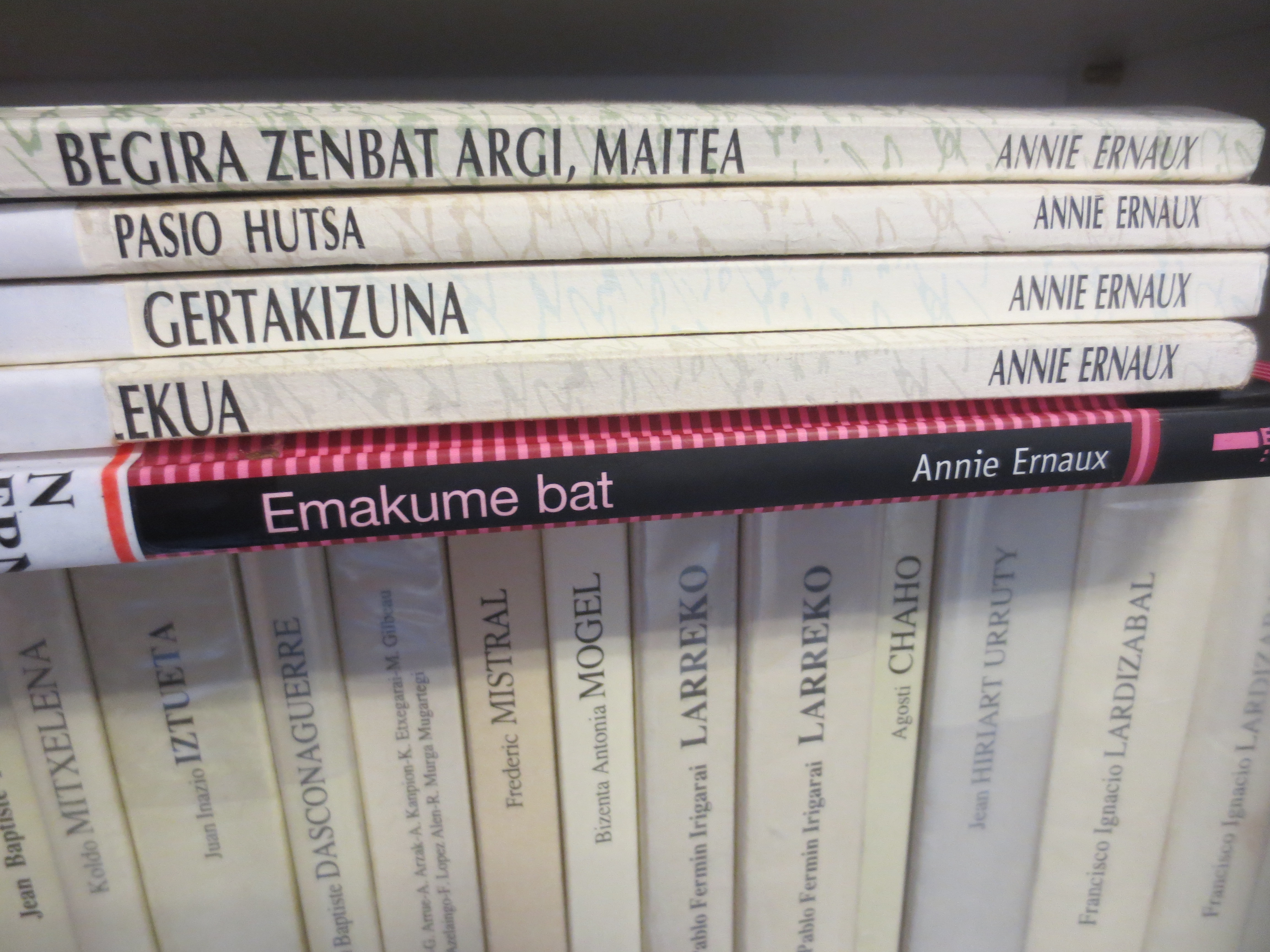
Some of Annie Ernaux's novels translated into Basque language.

=== Personal reactions ===
Interviewed by Claire Paetku, correspondent of the Nobel Prize's Outreach, Annie Ernaux confessed she learned about her win at around one o'clock while she was in her kitchen listening to her radio. She turned on the radio wanting to know who won the 2022 Nobel prize, but to her surprise it was actually her who was being mentioned as the latest laureate. She described her initial feeling "like... you are in the desert and there is a call that is coming from the sky." Asked what would be her message for young writers, especially for those who are writing in their native language, she said:

"I think that when we write, what is really important is that we need to read a lot. Sometimes young people say, 'Oh no, I don't read... I write!' Well, no. That's not possible. You need to read a lot. And the second message I would give them is not to strive to write well, but rather to write honestly. It's not the same thing."

At a public press conference, she told journalists the following statement regarding her responsibility with the prize:

"The Nobel [prize], it hasn't sunk in yet, but it's true I feel I have a new responsibility. This responsibility is about carrying on the fight against injustice, whatever it is. I use the term 'injustice' but it has different levels. Everything that is a form of injustice towards women, towards those I call the dominated ones. I can tell you I will fight until my last breath so that women be able to choose to become mothers or to choose not to. It's a fundamental right. Contraception and the right to abortion are the core of women's freedom because it is a societal choice, it is a political choice and that's why in some countries, in some regions of the United States, in some states they're aware of this and that's why they want to maintain the centuries-old domination of women."

=== International reactions ===
Right after the Swedish Academy announced Ernaux as the recipient of the 2022 Nobel Prize in Literature, it immediately received numerous praises from literary societies and critics. Jacques Testard, from Fitzcarraldo Editions which publishes the English translations of her works, described her as "exceptional and unique" and a "very important feminist" writer of the contemporary times. "With her interest in memory and in writing a life", said Testard, "Proust is quite an obvious antecedent" for Ernaux.

Despite her being unsparing with President Emmanuel Macron, pouring scorn on his background in banking and said his first term as president failed to advance the cause of French women, the politician continued congratulating her for her literary achievement, saying through Twitter: "Annie Ernaux has been writing for 50 years the novel of the collective and intimate memory of our country. Her voice is that of women's freedom, and the century's forgotten ones."

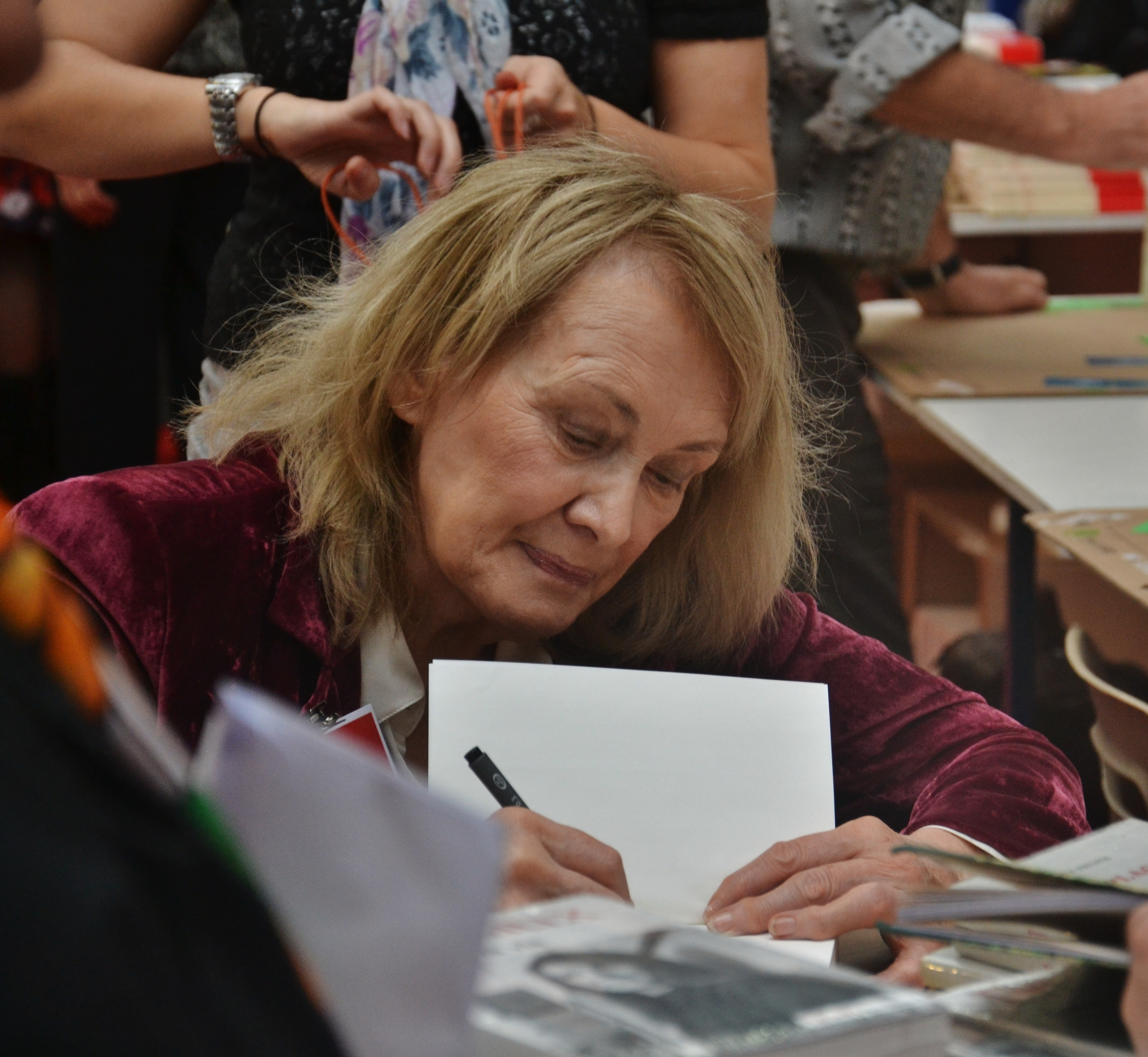
Annie Ernaux at the 30th Brive-la-Gaillarde Book Fair.

Professor Ruth Cruickshank, who specialises in contemporary French fiction at Royal Holloway, University of London, said: "When a woman wins the Nobel Prize for Literature it is always great news. Thirteen dead and two living white French men (Le Clézio and Modiano) have been Nobel laureates since 1901... Ernaux explores memories of life experiences – both extraordinary and relatable – a backstreet abortion; failed affairs whether with a lover in Russia or a man 30 years younger; the death of her parents; breast cancer." American novelist Brandon Taylor joked about Ernaux's win, saying: "Cinema is back. Annie Ernaux is a Nobel laureate. Perhaps modernity is saved." David Levitz of the DW News, described her as "an obscure choice" compared to authors Salman Rushdie and Michel Houellebecq, despite being the favorite to win in 2021.

French author Édouard Louis welcomed Ernaux's win, saying: "she didn't try to fit into existing definitions of literature, of what is beautiful: she came up with her own." He is often compared to her and referred to as her successor due to the similarities of their backgrounds and literary styles. "No one writes in the same way after reading Annie Ernaux," he said. Another admirer was philosopher Didier Eribon, who expressed: "I have such admiration for her, not just as a writer, but for her activism... She always found a way to capture in one sentence what I couldn't say in a page." Eribon first met Ernaux in 2002, shortly after the death of Pierre Bourdieu, a leading French sociologist and globalization critic, becoming close acquaintances thereafter.

Interviewed by a Euronews journalist whether he was disappointed that he was not awarded this year, despite being nominated annually, Albanian novelist Ismail Kadare replied that he had no such feelings. "As you can see," he said, "I have no thoughts. 40 years ago, I might have but not today." Kadare's wife, Helena Kadare, said that they did not know Ernaux and that they had not even heard of her before the ceremony, even though they have been living in France for many years. She said: "We don't know the writer who won the Nobel, even though we live in France. I've never heard her, to be sure, but I haven’t even heard her name before. As long as the Nobel jury is the same and has been saying no [to Kadare] for 40 years, you don’t have to change your opinion about them."

== Nobel lecture ==
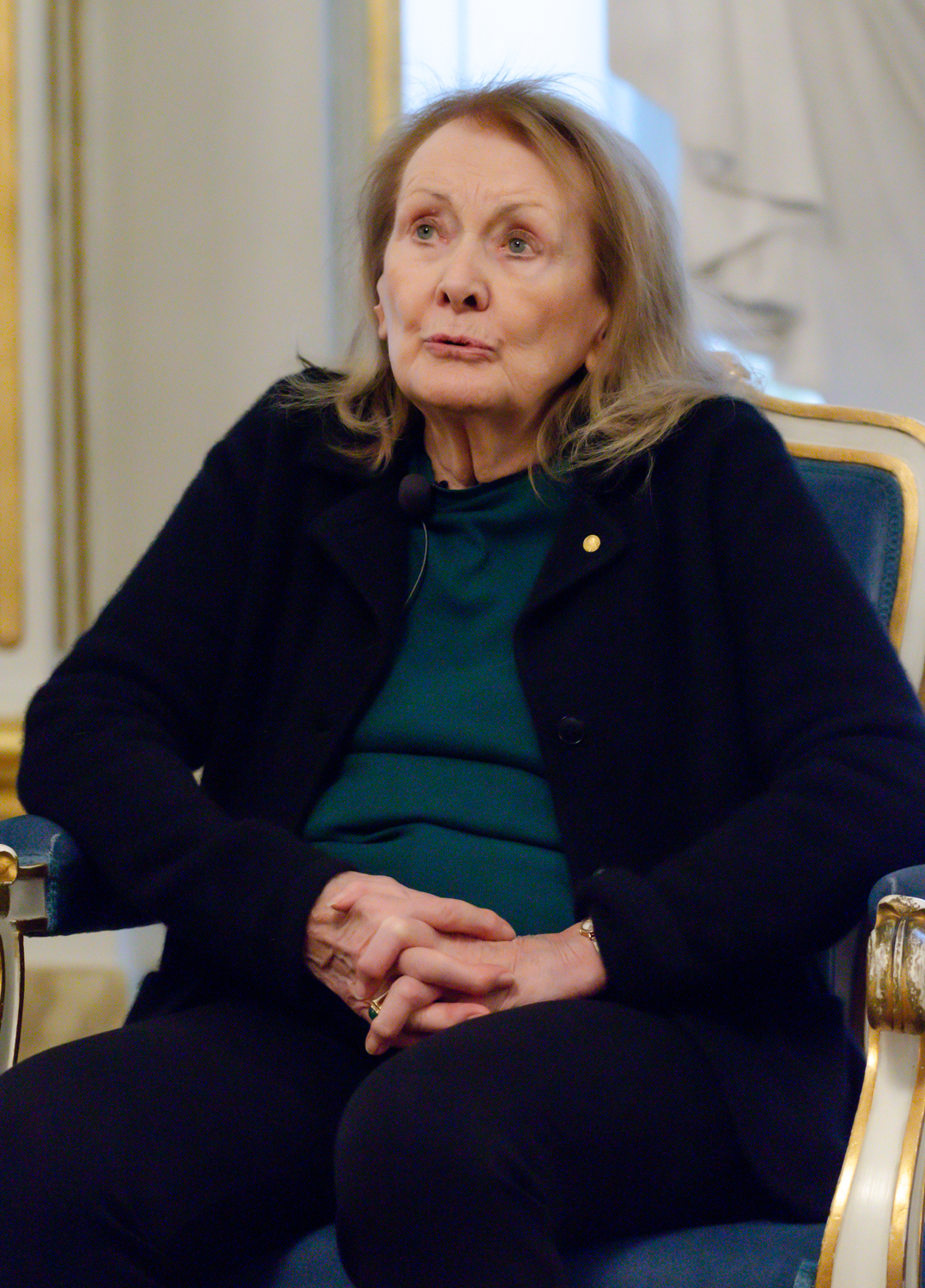
Press conference with Annie Ernaux in the Stockholm Stock Exchange Building at the Swedish Academy in Stockholm on December 7, 2022.

Ernaux delivered her Nobel lecture on December 7, 2022, and spoke of how she hopes her work, which mixes fiction and memoir, has affected others, or in her own words, "shatter the loneliness of experiences endured and repressed and enable beings to reimagine themselves." She said she took to writing her personal experiences because "a book can contribute to change" and "enable beings to reimagine themselves". She mentioned Rimbaud, Flaubert, Proust, Woolf, Camus, Rousseau, Kafka, Hugo and among others as authors who somehow shaped her views and influenced her writing style. In her youth, she began to love a wide array of literary masterpieces due to her mother's passion. She elaborated:

"From the time I could read, books were my companions, and reading was my natural occupation outside of school. This appetite was nurtured by a mother who, between customers, in her shop, read a great many novels, and preferred me reading rather than sewing and knitting. The high cost of books, the suspicion with which they were regarded at my religious school, made them even more desirable. Don Quixote, Gulliver's Travels, Jane Eyre, the tales of Grimm and Andersen, David Copperfield, Gone with the Wind, and later Les Misérables, The Grapes of Wrath, Nausea, The Stranger: chance, more than the school's prescriptions, determined what I read."

== Award ceremony ==
=== Prize presentation ===
Ernaux received her Nobel diploma and medal from Carl XVI Gustaf, King of Sweden, on 10 December 2022. Nobel Committee chairman Anders Olsson described her as an author who regards "language [as] a means to dispel the fog of memory and a knife to uncover the real". He noted:

"Annie Ernaux’s writing is restrained with feelings and expressions of emotion, but passion pulses beneath the surface. Relentlessly, Ernaux exposes the shame that penetrates class experience... An unrelenting gaze and a plain style are [her] characteristics, and that she succeeds in making her pain relevant to all.

=== Banquet speech ===
In her banquet speech at Stockholm City Hall on 10 December 2022, Ernaux hailed Albert Camus, who was awarded the 1957 Nobel Prize in Literature. She said:

"I was seventeen in 1957, when I heard on the radio that Albert Camus had been awarded the Nobel Prize in Literature in Stockholm. So I discovered, with a mixture of pride and delight, that the author of L’étranger and L’homme révolté, two texts that had deeply affected me, had just been honored by the greatest arbiter of distinction in the world. To find myself here, sixty-five years later, fills me with a sense of profound amazement and gratitude. Amazement at the mystery presented by a life’s trajectory and the uncertain, solitary pursuit of its writing. And gratitude for allowing me to join Camus and those other writers, living and dead, whom I admire."

== Other Nobel-related events ==
=== Nobel campaigns for Rushdie ===
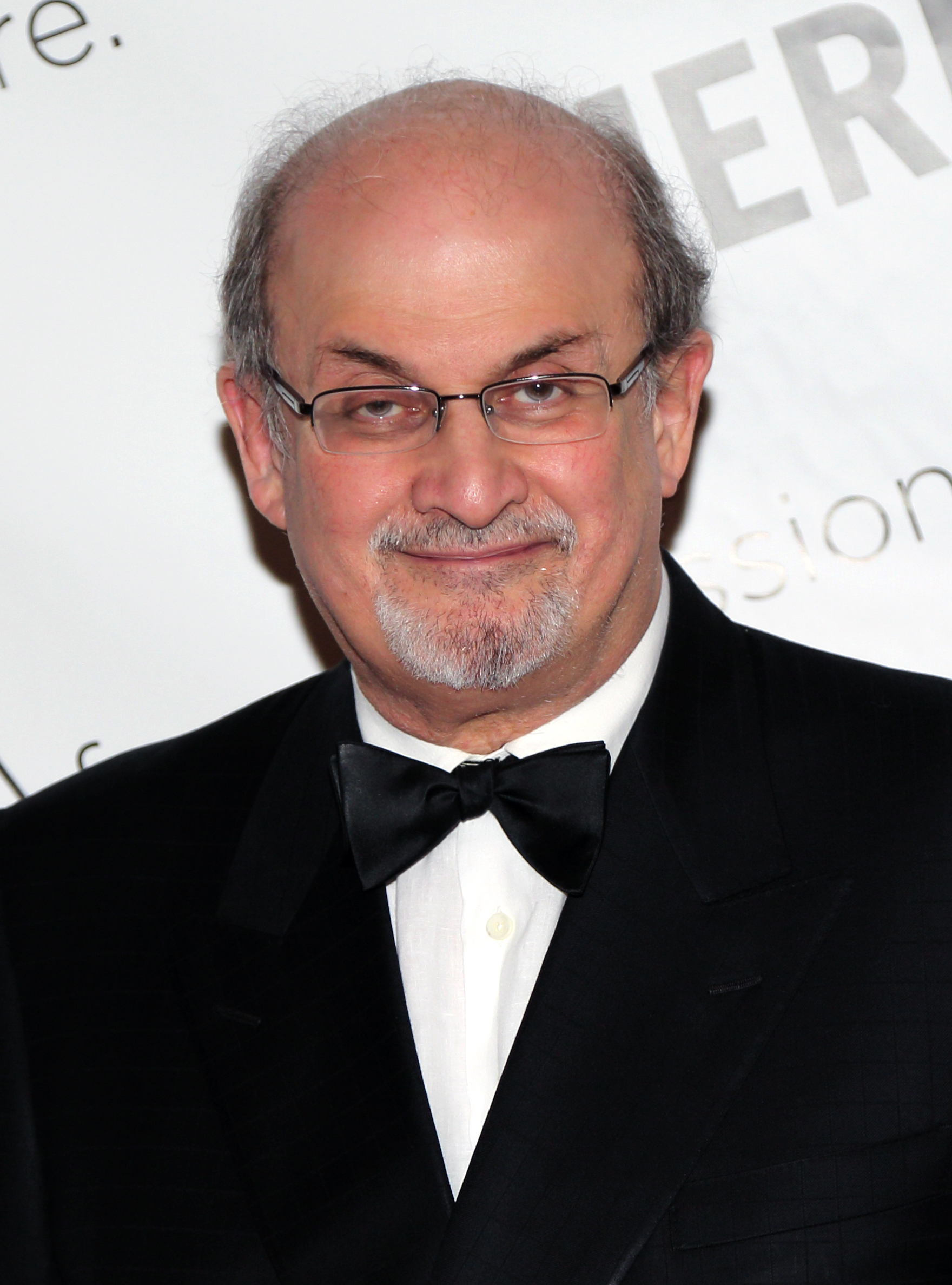
British author Salman Rushdie was among the favourites to win the 2022 Nobel Prize in Literature based on online betting sites.

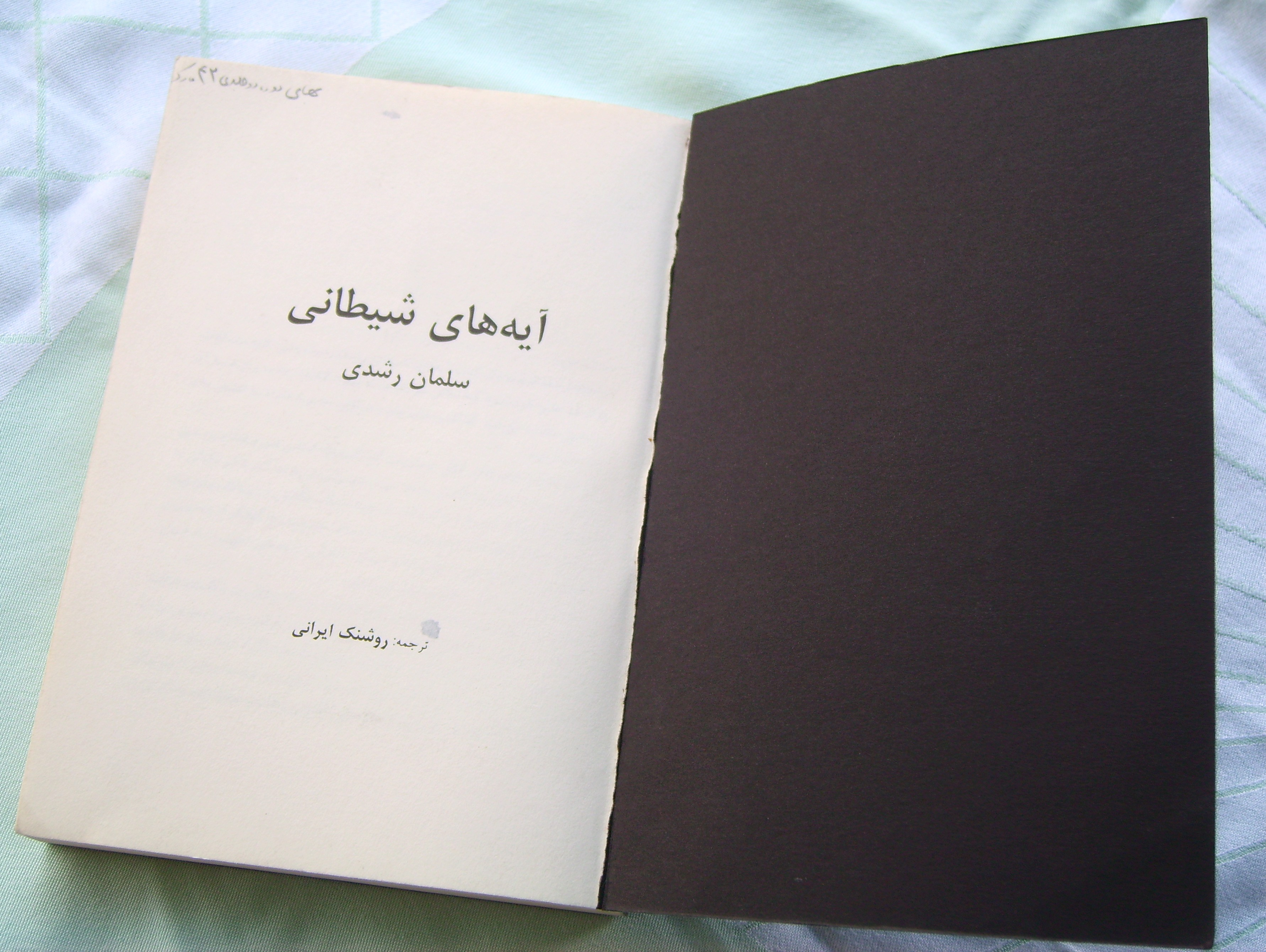
Persian Samizdat edition of Salman Rushdie's Satanic Verses c. 2000

Following the attack on the British author Salman Rushdie on August 12, 2022, as he was about to give a public lecture at the Chautauqua Institution in Chautauqua, New York, U.S., numerous academic institutions and societies started calling the attention of the Swedish Academy's Nobel Committee to bestow him this year's Nobel Prize in Literature. Among the authors calling to recognize Rushdie were French philosopher Bernard-Henri Lévy, French Minister of Culture Françoise Nyssen, British writers Ian McEwan and Neil Gaiman, Indian writers Kavery Nambisan and Adil Jussawalla, and Canadian author Margaret Atwood who declared, "If we don’t defend free speech, we live in tyranny: Salman Rushdie shows us that." American journalist David Remnick explains why Rushdie deserves the Nobel Prize:

"As a literary artist, Rushdie is richly deserving of the Nobel, and the case is only augmented by his role as an uncompromising defender of freedom and a symbol of resiliency. No such gesture could reverse the wave of illiberalism that has engulfed so much of the world. But, after all its bewildering choices, the Swedish Academy has the opportunity, by answering the ugliness of a state-issued death sentence with the dignity of its highest award, to rebuke all the clerics, autocrats, and demagogues—including our own—who would galvanize their followers at the expense of human liberty. Freedom of expression, as Rushdie’s ordeal reminds us, has never come free, but the prize is worth the price."

Rushdie, known for his controversial 1988 novel The Satanic Verses which earned him a fatwā from Iran's supreme leader Ayatollah Khomeini, has annually been included in the Ladbrokes odds. Journalist Jeff Simon of The Buffalo News expressed the possibility of Rushdie winning the prestigious prize, saying:

"A Nobel for Rushdie wouldn't only be a glorious message from our civilization to all who would decry "the free word"; it would, in effect, be a way of redeeming, in its hour of need, the Nobel Prize for Literature itself... And now just imagine what it might possibly mean this October if they decided, after all, to give the Nobel to [him], who currently lives and works in America but is civilization's very symbol of how much courage is often required of the written word in this world."

It was not until 27 years later when the Swedish Academy, which had been neutral regarding the Rushdie affairs, condemned the Iranian death warrant against the British author. Prior to the condemnation, two of the Academy's members, Kerstin Ekman and Lars Gyllensten, stopped participating in the Academy's work in protest at its refusal to make an appeal to the Swedish cabinet in support for Rushdie.

Rushdie is noted for his literary works such as Midnight's Children (1981), The Moor's Last Sigh (1995), Shalimar the Clown (2005), and Joseph Anton: A Memoir (2012), an account of his life in the wake of the events following The Satanic Verses. Since then he has become an icon for "freedom of speech" in the realm of literature.

Following Ernaux's win, many Rushdie supporters as well as some writers expressed disappointment for Rushdie not being awarded despite the campaigns and appeals. If given the chance to win in the future, he will be the second Indian to do so – after Rabindranath Tagore won it for Gitanjali way back in 1913.

== Nobel Committee ==
In 2022, the Swedish Academy's Nobel Committee was composed of the following members:

Committee Members
Seat No.	Picture	Name	Elected	Position	Profession
4		Anders Olsson (b. 1949)	2008	committee chair	literary critic, literary historian
11		Mats Malm (b. 1964)	2018	associate member permanent secretary	translator, literary historian, editor
12		Per Wästberg (b. 1933)	1997	member	novelist, journalist, poet, essayist
13		Anne Swärd (b. 1969)	2019	member	novelist
9		Ellen Mattson (b. 1963)	2019	member	novelist, essayist
14		Steve Sem-Sandberg (b. 1958)	2021	member	journalist, author, translator
