= L'Événement =

L'Événement means "The Happening" in French. It may refer to:

- L'Événement-Journal, a Canadian newspaper
- L'Événement (book), a 2000 book by Annie Ernaux (translated as Happening)
- L'Événement (film), a 2021 film based on the book (also titled Happening)
- L'Événement, a French political newspaper started in 1872
- L'Événement du jeudi, a French news magazine started in 1985 and ceasing in 2001
