= Hal Fredericks =

Canadian author and management consultant

H. A. "Hal" Fredericks is an author and management consultant for governments and businesses in Canada and the United States. He was born in Nova Scotia and served as a governor and director (1955–1960) of the Atlantic Provinces Economic Council and vice president of APEC in New Brunswick (1960–1961). He is a member of the New Brunswick Research and Productivity Council and served as assistant to the general manager during the organization of the New Brunswick Development Corporation.

He is an honorary alumnus of the University of New Brunswick.

== Books by H. A. Fredericks ==
- Bricklin - (with Allan Chambers) (1977) ISBN 0-88790-087-9 (softcover) ISBN 0-88790-088-7 (hardcover)
- How to Brickle The New Brunswick Funny Book - Interduction [sic] under the pseudonym Stillman "Still" Pickens (1977) ISBN 0-9690732-0-8
- Bricklemanship The New Brunswick Grief Book - Interduction [sic] under the pseudonym Stillman "Still" Pickens (1978) ISBN 0-9690732-1-6
- What Happened to the Blueprint for Atlantic Advance? The Leaders and Followers, The Politicians, the Experts and Promoters 2003 ISBN 0-9734984-0-4
