= Annie Ernaux =

French writer (born 1940)

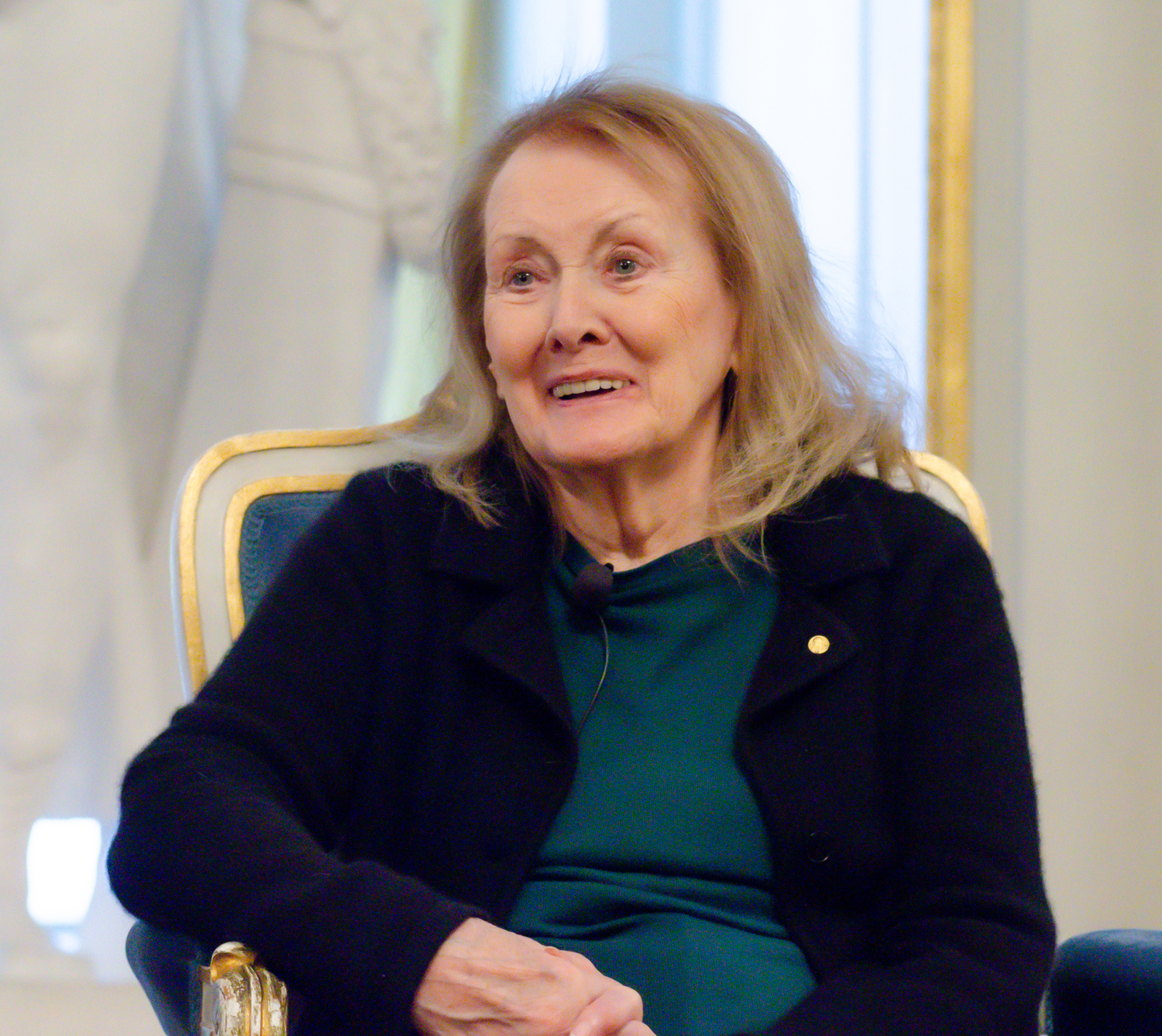
- Ernaux in 2022
- Born: Annie Thérèse Blanche Duchesne; 1 September 1940 (age 86); Lillebonne, France
- Education: University of Rouen; University of Bordeaux
- Spouse: Philippe Ernaux (div. 1980)
- Children: 2
- Writing career
- Notable awards: Nobel Prize in Literature (2022)
- Website: annie-ernaux.org

Signature
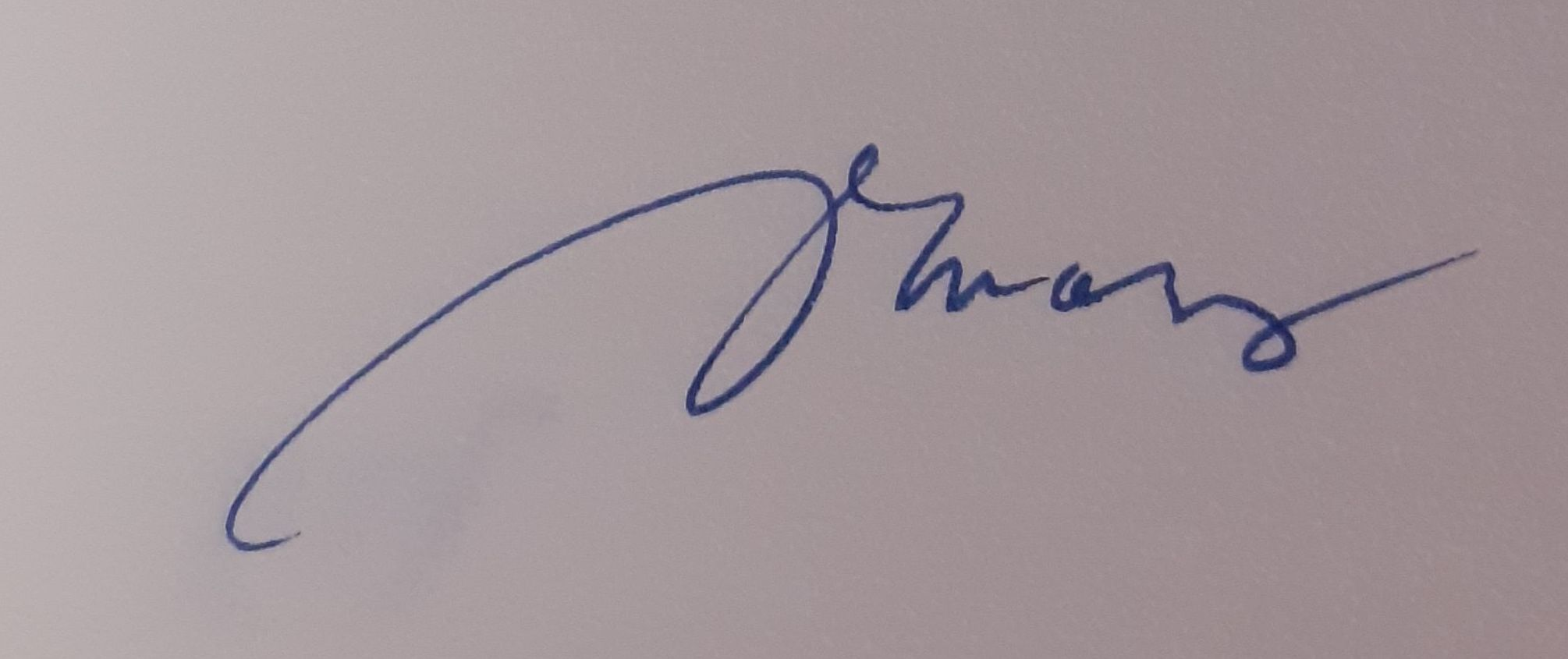

Annie Thérèse Blanche Ernaux (French: [ɛʁno]; née Duchesne [dyʃɛn]; born 1 September 1940) is a French writer who was awarded the 2022 Nobel Prize in Literature "for the courage and clinical acuity with which she uncovers the roots, estrangements, and collective restraints of personal memory". Her literary work, mostly autobiographical, maintains close links with sociology.

== Early life and education ==
Annie Thérèse Blanche Ernaux, born Duchesne, was born in 1940 in Lillebonne in Normandy, France, and grew up in nearby Yvetot, where her parents, Blanche (Dumenil) and Alphonse Duchesne, ran a café and grocery in a working-class part of town. In 1960, she travelled to London, England, where she worked as an au pair, an experience she would later relate in 2016's Mémoire de fille (A Girl's Story). Upon returning to France, she studied at the universities of Rouen and then Bordeaux, qualified as a schoolteacher, and earned a higher degree in modern literature in 1971. She worked for a time on a thesis project, unfinished, on Pierre de Marivaux.

In the early 1970s, Ernaux taught at a lycée in Bonneville, Haute-Savoie, at the college of Évire in Annecy-le-Vieux, then in Pontoise, before joining the National Centre for Distance Education, where she worked for 23 years.

== Literary career ==
Ernaux started her literary career in 1974 with Les Armoires vides (Cleaned Out), an autobiographical novel. Ernaux wrote her second book (Do What They Say or Else) in 1976, shortly after moving to Cergy-Pontoise. In 1984, she won the Renaudot Prize for another of her works La Place (A Man's Place), an autobiographical narrative focusing on her relationship with her father and her experiences growing up in a small town in France, and her subsequent process of moving into adulthood and away from her parents' place and her class of origin.

Early in her career, Ernaux turned from fiction to focus on autobiography. Her work combines historic and individual experiences. She charts her parents' social progression (La Place, La Honte), her teenage years (Ce qu'ils disent ou rien), her marriage (La Femme gelée), her passionate affair with an Eastern European man (Passion simple), her abortion (L'Événement), Alzheimer's disease (Je ne suis pas sortie de ma nuit), the death of her mother (Une femme), along with a joint memoir with Marc Marie in which the two document their love affair through a series of photographs (L'usage de la photo). Ernaux also wrote L'écriture comme un couteau (Writing as Sharp as a Knife) with Frédéric-Yves Jeannet.

A Woman's Story (Une femme), A Man's Place, and Simple Passion were recognised as The New York Times Notable Books, and A Woman's Story was a finalist for the Los Angeles Times Book Prize. Shame was named a Publishers Weekly Best Book of 1998, I Remain in Darkness a Top Memoir of 1999 by The Washington Post, and The Possession was listed as a Top Ten Book of 2008 by More magazine.

Ernaux's 2008 historical memoir Les Années (The Years), well received by French critics, is considered by many to be her magnum opus. In this book, Ernaux writes about herself in the third person ('elle', or 'she' in English) for the first time, providing a vivid look at French society just after the Second World War until the early 2000s. It is the story of a woman and of the evolving society she lived in. The Years won the 2008 Prix François-Mauriac de la région Aquitaine, the 2008 Marguerite Duras Prize, the 2008 Prix de la langue française, the 2009 Télégramme Readers Prize, and the 2016 Strega European Prize. Translated by Alison L. Strayer, The Years was a finalist for the 31st Annual French-American Foundation Translation Prize, was nominated for the International Booker Prize in 2019, and won the 2019 Warwick Prize for Women in Translation. Her popularity in anglophone countries increased sharply after The Years was shortlisted for the International Booker.

On 6 October 2022, it was announced that Ernaux would be awarded the 2022 Nobel Prize in Literature "for the courage and clinical acuity with which she uncovers the roots, estrangements and collective restraints of personal memory". Ernaux is the 16th French writer, and the first Frenchwoman, to receive the literature prize. In congratulating her, the president of France, Emmanuel Macron, said that she was the voice "of the freedom of women and of the forgotten".

Her literary work, mostly autobiographical, maintains close links with sociology. Many of Ernaux's works have been translated into English and published by Fitzcarraldo Editions and Seven Stories Press. Ernaux is one of the seven founding authors from whom the latter Press takes its name.

== Political activism ==
Ernaux supported Jean-Luc Mélenchon in the 2012 French presidential election. In 2018, she expressed her support for the yellow vests protests.

Ernaux has repeatedly indicated her support for the BDS movement, a Palestinian-led campaign promoting boycott, divestment and sanctions against Israel. In 2018, the author signed a letter alongside about 80 other artists that opposed the holding of the Israel–France cross-cultural season by the Israeli and French governments. In 2019, Ernaux signed a letter calling on a French state-owned broadcasting network not to air the Eurovision Song Contest, which was held in Israel that year. In 2021, after the Operation Guardian of the Walls, she signed another letter that called Israel an apartheid state, claiming that "To frame this as a war between two equal sides is false and misleading. Israel is the colonizing power. Palestine is colonized." In October 2024, Ernaux signed an open letter alongside several thousand authors pledging to boycott Israeli cultural institutions. In December 2025, she was one of over two hundred public cultural figures who signed an open letter urging Israel to release the jailed Palestinian leader Marwan Barghouti. In August 2026, Ernaux, along with other figures including Roger Waters, Isabel Coixet, and Matteo Garrone signed and issued an open letter to the Venice Film Festival, urging them to take "concrete" action to support Palestine.

Ernaux signed a letter that supported the release of Georges Abdallah, who was sentenced to life imprisonment in 1982 for the assassination of an American military attaché, Lt. Col. Charles R. Ray, and an Israeli diplomat, Yacov Barsimantov. According to the letter, the victims were "active Mossad and CIA agents, while Abdallah fought for the Palestinian people and against colonization".

Following the announcement of the award of the Nobel Prize, Ernaux showed solidarity with Iranian women's opposition to the mandatory wearing of a headscarf. Ernaux said in a short interview she was "absolutely in favour of women revolting against this absolute constraint".

== Personal life ==
Ernaux married Philippe Ernaux, with whom she had two sons, Éric (born in 1964) and David (born in 1968). The couple divorced in 1981.

She has been a resident of Cergy-Pontoise, a new town in the Paris suburbs, since the mid-1970s, and was still living there as of 2022.

== Awards and distinctions ==
- 1977 Prix d'Honneur for Ce qu'ils disent ou rien
- 1984 Prix Renaudot for La Place
- 2008 Prix Marguerite-Duras for Les Années
- 2008 Prix François-Mauriac for Les Années
- 2008 Prix de la langue française for the entirety of her oeuvre
- 2014 Doctor honoris causa of Cergy-Pontoise University
- 2016 Strega European Prize for The Years (translated into Italian as Gli Anni) (L'Orma)
- 2017 Prix Marguerite Yourcenar, awarded by the Civil Society of Multimedia Authors, for the entirety of her oeuvre
- 2018 Premio Hemingway per la letteratura for the entirety of her oeuvre
- 2019 Prix Formentor
- 2019 Premio Gregor von Rezzori for Una Donna (Une Femme)
- 2019 Shortlisted for the International Booker Prize for The Years
- 2021 Elected a Royal Society of Literature International Writer
- 2022 Nobel Prize in Literature

From 2003 to 2008, the Prix Annie-Ernaux existed.

== Works ==
- Les Armoires vides, Paris: Gallimard, 1974; Gallimard, 1984. ISBN 978-2-07-037600-1
  - Cleaned out. Translated by Carol Sanders. Dalkey Archive Press. 1990. ISBN 978-1-56478-139-0.
- Ce qu'ils disent ou rien, Paris: Gallimard, 1977; French & European Publications, Incorporated, 1989, ISBN 978-0-7859-2655-9
  - Do What They Say or Else. Translated by Christopher Beach and Carrie Noland. University of Nebraska Press. 2022. ISBN 978-1-4962-2800-0.
- La Femme gelée, Paris: Gallimard, 1981; French & European Publications, Incorporated, 1987, ISBN 978-0-7859-2535-4
  - A Frozen Woman. Translated by Linda Coverdale. Four Walls Eight Windows. 1995. ISBN 978-1-56858-029-6.
- La Place, Paris: Gallimard, 1983; Distribooks Inc, 1992, ISBN 978-2-07-037722-0
  - La Place. Translated by Tanya Leslie. Psychology Press. 1990. ISBN 978-0-415-05926-8.
  - Positions. Translated by Tanya Leslie. Quartet Books. 1991. ISBN 978-0-704-32785-6.
  - A Man's Place. Translated by Tanya Leslie. Seven Stories Press. 1992. ISBN 978-0-941423-75-5.
- Une Femme, Paris: Gallimard, 1988
  - A Woman's Story. Translated by Tanya Leslie. Seven Stories Press. 2003. ISBN 978-1-58322-575-2.
- Passion simple, Paris: Gallimard, 1991; Gallimard, 1993, ISBN 978-2-07-038840-0
  - Simple Passion. Translated by Tanya Leslie. Seven Stories Press. 2003. ISBN 978-1-58322-574-5.
- Journal du dehors, Paris: Gallimard, 1993
  - Exteriors. Translated by Tanya Leslie. Seven Stories Press. 1996. ISBN 978-1-888363-31-9.
- La Honte, Paris: Gallimard, 1997
  - Shame, translator Tanya Leslie, Seven Stories Press, 1998, ISBN 978-1-888363-69-2
- «Je ne suis pas sortie de ma nuit», Paris: Gallimard, 1997
  - "I Remain in Darkness". Translated by Tanya Leslie. Seven Stories Press. 1999. ISBN 978-1-58322-014-6.
- La Vie extérieure : 1993–1999, Paris: Gallimard, 2000
  - Things Seen. Translated by Jonathan Kaplansky. University of Nebraska Press. 2010. ISBN 978-0-8032-2815-3.
- L'Événement, Paris: Gallimard, 2000, ISBN 978-2-07-075801-2
  - Happening. Translated by Tanya Leslie. Seven Stories Press. 2001. ISBN 978-1-58322-256-0.
- Se perdre, Paris: Gallimard, 2001
  - Getting Lost, translator Allison L. Strayer, Seven Stories Press, 2022
- L'Occupation, Paris: Gallimard, 2002
  - The Possession. Translated by Anna Moschovakis. Seven Stories Press. 2008. ISBN 978-1-58322-855-5.
- L'Usage de la photo, with Marc Marie, Paris: Gallimard, 2005
  - The Use of Photography. Translated by Alison L. Strayer. Seven Stories Press. 2024. ISBN 978-1-644214-13-8.
- Les Années, Paris: Gallimard, 2008, ISBN 978-2-07-077922-2
  - The Years. Translated by Alison L. Strayer. Seven Stories Press. 2017. ISBN 978-1-60980-787-0.
- L'Autre fille, Paris: Nil 2011 ISBN 978-2-84111-539-6
  - The Other Girl. Translated by Alison L. Strayer. Seven Stories Press. 2025. ISBN 978-1-64421-487-9
- L'Atelier noir, Paris: éditions des Busclats, 2011
- Écrire la vie, Paris: Gallimard, 2011
- Retour à Yvetot, éditions du Mauconduit, 2013
- Regarde les lumières mon amour, Seuil, 2014
  - Look at the Lights, My Love. Translated by Alison L. Strayer. Yale University Press. 2023. ISBN 978-0-300-26821-8.
- Mémoire de fille, Gallimard, 2016
  - A Girl's Story. Translated by Alison L. Strayer. Seven Stories Press. 2020. ISBN 978-1-60980-951-5.
- Hôtel Casanova, Gallimard Folio, 2020
- Le jeune homme, Gallimard, 2022
  - The Young Man. Translated by Alison L. Strayer. Seven Stories Press. 2023. ISBN 978-1-644213-20-9.

== Adaptations and film work ==
In addition to numerous theatrical and radio adaptations, several of Ernaux's novels have been adapted for the cinema:

- L'Événement (2021), directed by Audrey Diwan, released in English as Happening. It received the Golden Lion at the 2021 Venice Film Festival.
- Passion simple (2020; English title: Simple Passion) directed by Danielle Arbid. It was selected to be shown at that year's Cannes Film Festival.
- L'Autre (2008), based on L'Occupation and titled The Other One in English.
- Mémoire de fille (2026), directed by Judith Godrèche, titled A Girl’s Story in English.
- The Super 8 Years (2022), a documentary assembled from home video footage shot between 1972 and 1981, was written and narrated by Ernaux and co-directed with her son David Ernaux-Briot. The English subtitles were translated by Alison L. Strayer.
