= Jonathan Kaplansky =

Canadian translator

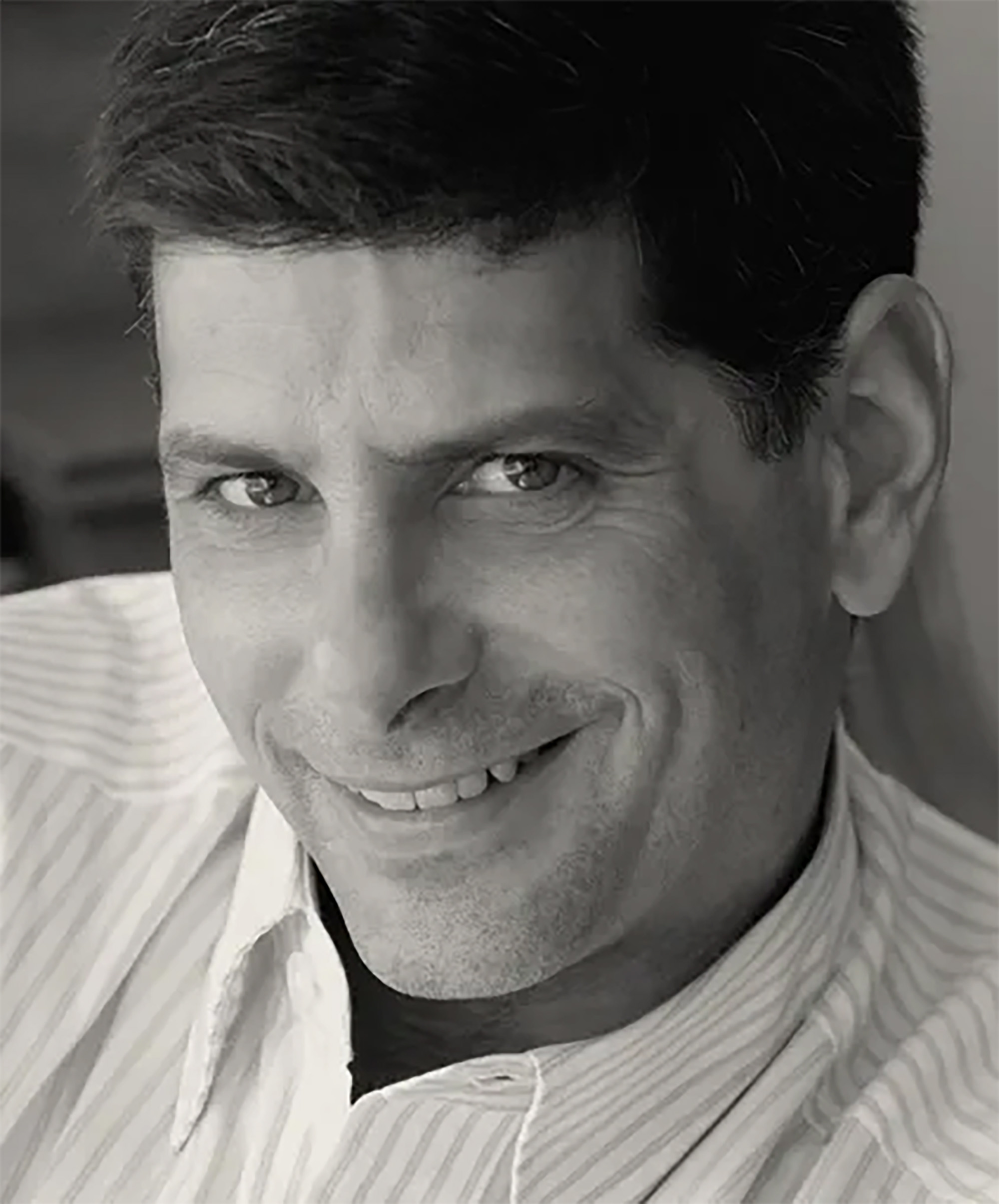
- Born: Saint John, New Brunswick, Canada
- Occupation: Translator
- Writing career
- Genres: Literary fiction, non-fiction, poetry, youth literature
- Notable works: Things Seen by Annie Ernaux; Chemin Saint-Paul by Lise Tremblay; Sleepless Nights and Days of Glory by Hélène Rioux; Not Even the Sound of a River by Hélène Dorion
- Website: www.jonathankaplansky.ca

Jonathan Kaplansky is a Canadian literary translator based in Montreal, Quebec. He is best known for his English translations of contemporary French and Québécois literature. He has translated several prominent Québec authors, such as Hélène Dorion, Lise Gauvin, Louis-Philippe Hébert, Hélène Rioux, and Lise Tremblay, as well as a journal by Nobel laureate Annie Ernaux.

== Early life and education ==
Born in Saint John, New Brunswick, Kaplansky was educated at the Pomfret School in Connecticut before attending Tufts University, where he majored in French. During his undergraduate studies, he spent a year in Paris at the Sorbonne Nouvelle. He later returned to Montreal, where he earned a Master of Arts in French Language and Literature from McGill University. He furthered his studies at the University of Ottawa, obtaining a Master of Arts in Translation.

== Career ==
Kaplansky began his career in education, teaching French and English as a second language before transitioning into professional translation. In 1999, while working in Ottawa, he published his first article in English on the translator Eleanor Marx in the journal Circuit. He has translated numerous literary works, including fiction, non-fiction, poetry, and youth literature. Kaplansky's translation of Lise Gauvin's writing has a dexterity and familiarity. His translation of Reading Nijinsky by Hélène Rioux "is surprisingly natural—the book's preoccupation with linguistic interplay lets it leap into English quite easily, and Jonathan Kaplansky has kept the narrative clean and meditative." His most notable translation is Things Seen (La Vie extérieure) by Annie Ernaux, published by the University of Nebraska Press in 2010, which Susan Salter Reynolds in The Los Angeles Times described as a "beautiful translation." In 2022, he translated the libretto for the opera Yourcenar: Une île de passions by Hélène Dorion and Marie-Claire Blais, which was performed by the Opéra de Montréal. Kaplansky is an active member of the literary community and has served on the executive of the Literary Translators' Association of Canada (LTAC).

== Awards and recognition ==
- Wall Award Finalist (2007): Kaplansky's translation of Frank Borzage: The Life and Films of a Hollywood Romantic by Hervé Dumont, foreword by Martin Scorsese. McFarland, 2006.
- French Voices Award (2010): Awarded to translate La Vie extérieure / Things Seen by Annie Ernaux.
- Governor General's Literary Awards: Served as a peer-assessment juror for the French-to-English translation category in 2003 and 2021.
- David Booth Award (2024): Shortlisted for his translation of Like a Hurricane by Jonathan Bécotte.

== Selected translations ==
- Reading Nijinsky (2001) by Hélène Rioux, translated by Jonathan Kaplansky
- Samuel de Champlain: Father of New France (2004) by Francine Legaré, translated by Jonathan Kaplansky
- Frank Borzage: The Life and Films of a Hollywood Romantic (2005) by Hervé Dumont, translated by Jonathan Kaplansky
- Wednesday Night at the End of the World (2009) by Hélène Rioux, translated by Jonathan Kaplansky
- Things Seen (2010) by Annie Ernaux, translated by Jonathan Kaplansky
- The Legacy of Tiananmen Square (2013) by Michel Cormier, translated by Jonathan Kaplansky
- Chemin Saint-Paul (2018) by Lise Tremblay, translated by Jonathan Kaplansky
- Sleepless Nights and Days of Glory (2019) by Hélène Rioux translated by Jonathan Kaplansky
- The Cry of Vertières: Liberation, Memory, and the Beginning of Haiti (2020) by Jean-Pierre Le Glaunec, translated by Jonathan Kaplansky
- Like a Hurricane (2023) by Jonathan Bécotte, translated by Jonathan Kaplansky
- Not Even the Sound of a River (2024) by Hélène Dorion, translated by Jonathan Kaplansky
