= Herb Emery =

Canadian economist

J. C. Herbert Emery is a Canadian economist and the Vaughn Chair in regional economics at University of New Brunswick.

== Early life and education ==
Emery received a bachelor of arts in economics from Queen's University at Kingston. He graduated from the University of British Columbia with a master's degree and PhD in economics.

== Career ==
He taught at the University of Calgary between 1993 and 2016, where he served as Svare Professor in Health Economics and Full Professor in Economics and Research Director for The School of Public Policy. In 1999, he and George Emery co-authored A Young Man’s Benefit: The Independent Order of Odd Fellows and Sickness Insurance in the United States and Canada, 1860–1929. He was managing editor of Canadian Public Policy from 2010 until 2015.

He has been the Vaughn Chair in regional economics at University of New Brunswick since 2016.
