= Happening (film) =

2021 film by Audrey Diwan

- Theatrical release poster
- French: L'Événement
- Directed by: Audrey Diwan
- Screenplay by: Audrey Diwan; Marcia Romano
- Based on: L'événement by Annie Ernaux
- Produced by: Edouard Weil; Alice Girard
- Starring: Anamaria Vartolomei; Kacey Mottet Klein; Sandrine Bonnaire; Louise Orry-Diquero; Louise Chevillotte; Pio Marmaï; Anna Mouglalis; Fabrizio Rongione; Luàna Bajrami; Leonor Oberson
- Cinematography: Laurent Tangy
- Edited by: Géraldine Mangenot
- Music by: Evgueni Galperine; Sacha Galperine
- Production companies: Rectangle Productions; France 3 Cinéma; SRAB Films
- Distributed by: Wild Bunch
- Release dates: 6 September 2021 (Venice); 24 November 2021 (France)
- Running time: 100 minutes
- Country: France
- Language: French
- Box office: $1.6 million

Happening (French: L'Événement) is a 2021 French drama film directed by Audrey Diwan. The film's adapted screenplay was written by Diwan and Marcia Romano from the 2000 memoir Happening by Annie Ernaux. Set in 1963, the film stars Anamaria Vartolomei as Anne, who experiences the emotionally and physically traumatic process of obtaining an abortion in France before it was legalized. The film also stars Luàna Bajrami, Pio Marmaï, Sandrine Bonnaire, Anna Mouglalis, Louise Chevillotte, Kacey Mottet Kelin, and Louise Orry-Diquéro in supporting roles with cinematography by Laurent Tangy.

Happening premiered at the 78th Venice International Film Festival on September 6, 2021, where it won the Golden Lion and received universal acclaim from critics. It was released in French theatres by Wild Bunch on 24 November 2021. It was well received, being nominated for and winning numerous awards at the BAFTAs, Gotham Awards, Lumière Awards, and César Awards.

== Plot ==
In 1963 France, Anne is a promising university student in Angoulême. Despite having several close friends, she is often ridiculed by other students for supposedly being promiscuous, though it is stated multiple times that all of the students "want the same thing."

While visiting her family in the countryside, Anne goes to see her doctor. Despite her asserting that she is still a virgin, the doctor informs her she is pregnant. Anne begs him to terminate the pregnancy and he refuses, telling her that what she is asking is illegal. Anne visits another doctor in the city and also asks him for help with an abortion. He prescribes her an injection, promising it will induce a miscarriage. When it fails, Anne searches for a doctor to perform a surgical abortion. Later it is revealed that the injection was actually estradiol which, unbeknownst to Anne, helps maintain the pregnancy.

Anne approaches a classmate, Jean, for help, but he claims not to know anyone who can help her and instead propositions her for sex, noting there is no risk since she is already pregnant. Growing increasingly desperate, Anne attempts to perform an abortion on herself with a knitting needle on her bedroom floor, which fails. She informs her friends, who previously shared their desires for sexual intimacy, that she is pregnant and is trying to have an abortion, and they abandon her. As her grades begin to suffer and her chance at graduating with honours begins to slip away, Anne goes to see Maxime, her "boyfriend." Having previously been told by Anne that she intended to have an abortion, he is shocked to learn she is still pregnant, thinking she could handle the situation on her own, and they fight before she returns to school without his support.

Jean approaches Anne at night to introduce her to a female friend who has had an abortion, and the friend gives her the number of a back-alley abortionist, explaining that the abortion will be painful and cost 400 francs in advance. Anne sells all of her belongings to pay for the abortion, which takes place in a woman's apartment on her kitchen table. The woman instructs Anne that she will have to be silent so her neighbours do not hear, then inserts a probe and tells Anne that she will start to miscarry in 24 hours. Anne fails to miscarry and returns to the abortionist, who offers to insert a second probe, warning that this carries mortal risks. Anne decides to go through with the procedure nevertheless and returns to her dorm, where she has a complicated and painful miscarriage. Anne is found by a dormmate who helps to cut the umbilical cord and calls an ambulance. Her condition is officially recorded as a miscarriage.

The film ends with Anne returning to university to take her final exams.

== Cast ==
- Anamaria Vartolomei as Anne
- Kacey Mottet Klein as Jean
- Sandrine Bonnaire as Gabrielle Duchesne
- Louise Orry-Diquero as Brigitte
- Louise Chevillotte as Olivia
- Pio Marmaï as Professeur Bornec
- Anna Mouglalis as Mme Rivière
- Fabrizio Rongione as Dr. Ravinsky
- Luàna Bajrami as Hélène
- Leonor Oberson as Claire
- Julien Frison as Maxime
- Alice de Lencquesaing as Laëtitia

== Production ==
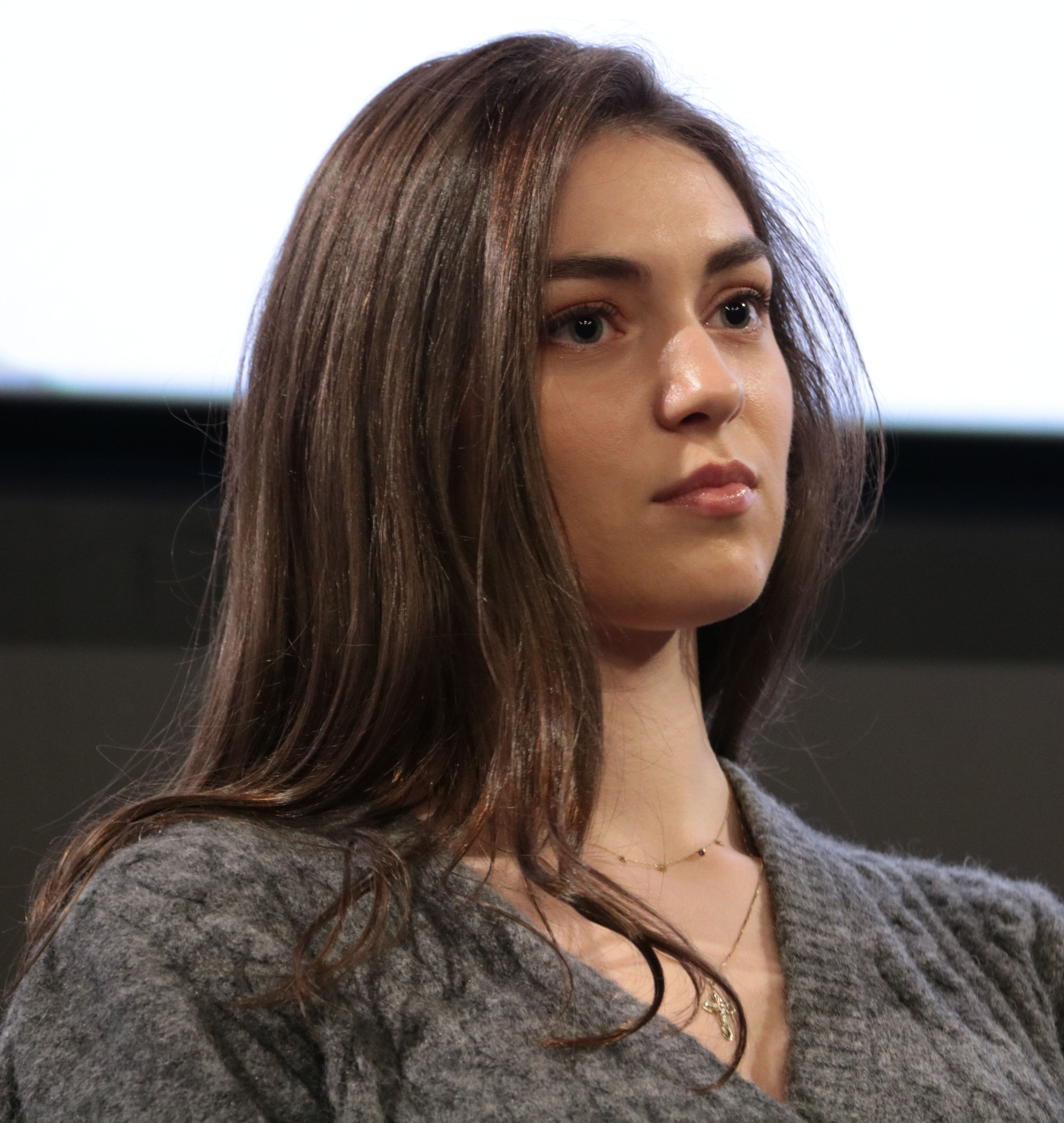
Anamaria Vartolomei in 2021

During an interview on 23 April 2019 about her directorial debut film Losing It, screenwriter Audrey Diwan revealed she was adapting Annie Ernaux's 2000 memoir L'événement (translated as Happening), stating that the book was "very important" to her. On 29 May 2020, the Centre national du cinéma et de l'image animée, an agency of the French Ministry of Culture, announced they would support the film, moving the project into pre-production.

Principal photography for the film commenced on 27 July 2020 and took place throughout the summer. The film entered post-production in January 2021.

== Release ==
The film had its world premiere in competition at the 78th Venice International Film Festival on 6 September 2021. Wild Bunch acquired distribution rights to the film for France in July 2021. Happening screened in the Spotlight section of the 2022 Sundance Film Festival. It was released in the United States on May 6, 2022, and is available to watch on streaming platforms such as Youtube, Hulu, and Amazon Prime.

== Reception ==
=== Critical response ===
On the review aggregator website Rotten Tomatoes, 99% of 172 critics' reviews are positive, with an average rating of 8.5/10. The website's consensus reads, "A tough but rewarding watch, Happening puts a personal face on an impossibly difficult choice and its heart-rending aftermath." Metacritic, which uses a weighted average, assigned the film a score of 86 out of 100 based on 36 critics' reviews, indicating "universal acclaim".

Guy Lodge, writing for Variety, praised the film's acting, particularly that of Anamaria Vartolomei's in the lead role that was described as "career-elevating". The Guardian's film festival critic Xan Brooks called the film "serious, gripping and finally honourable" and commended the cinematography of Laurent Tangy, saying that "the picture's tight framing is like a noose around her neck".

In an interview with the Financial Times, Diwan stated her intention to not make Happening a period piece, knowing "what my character was going through is now a current situation in many countries." Justin Chang, a film critic for the Los Angeles Times and NPR's Fresh Air, commended Diwan's choice to not make the film feel like a period piece, despite being a "re-creation of the past", as he thought the film "might very well be a window into the future." Michael O'Sullivan, a reporter and film critic for The Washington Post, states that Happening serves as a "sobering reminder that the consequences of limiting access to safe medical care aren't just theoretical but existential." At the time of the review in 2022, the U.S Supreme Court had recently made the decision to overturn Roe v. Wade, which had made access to abortion a constitutional right in the United States.

=== Accolades ===
Award	Date of ceremony	Category	Recipient(s)	Result	Ref.
Venice Film Festival	11 September 2021	Golden Lion	Audrey Diwan	Won	
Venice Film Festival	11 September 2021	Brian Award	Happening	Won	
La Roche-sur-Yon International Film Festival	20 October 2021	Audience Award	Happening	Won	
European Film Awards	11 December 2021	European University Film Award	Happening	Nominated	
Lumière Awards	18 January 2022	Best Film	Happening	Won	
Lumière Awards	18 January 2022	Best Director	Audrey Diwan	Nominated	
Lumière Awards	18 January 2022	Best Actress	Anamaria Vartolomei	Won	
Lumière Awards	18 January 2022	Best Cinematography	Laurent Tangy	Nominated	
César Awards	25 February 2022	Best Film	Happening	Nominated	
César Awards	25 February 2022	Best Director	Audrey Diwan	Nominated	
César Awards	25 February 2022	Most Promising Actress	Anamaria Vartolomei	Won	
César Awards	25 February 2022	Best Adaptation	Audrey Diwan and Marcia Romano	Nominated	
British Academy Film Awards	13 March 2022	Best Director	Audrey Diwan	Nominated	
Gotham Awards	28 November 2022	Best International Feature	Happening	Won	
Chicago Film Critics Association	14 December 2022	Best Foreign Language Film	Happening	Nominated	
Chicago Film Critics Association	14 December 2022	Milos Stehlik Breakthrough Filmmaker Award	Audrey Diwan	Nominated	
St. Louis Gateway Film Critics Association	18 December 2022	Best International Film	Happening	Nominated	
Alliance of Women Film Journalists	5 January 2023	Best Non-English Language Film	Happening	Nominated	
San Diego Film Critics Society	6 January 2023	Best International Film	Happening	Runner-up	
Directors Guild of America Awards	18 February 2023	Outstanding Directorial Achievement in First-Time Theatrical Feature Film	Audrey Diwan	Nominated	

== See also ==
- List of French films of 2021
