= Getting Lost =

2001 book by Annie Ernaux

- Author: Annie Ernaux
- Translator: Alison L. Strayer
- Publisher: Seven Stories Press
- Publication date: 2001
- Publication place: France
- Pages: 240
- ISBN: 978-1-64421-219-6

Getting Lost (French: Se perdre) is a 2001 memoir by Annie Ernaux published by Seven Stories Press and distributed by Penguin Random House. Originally released in 2001 in its original French, it was re-released in 2022 translated into English. The book details an 18-month love affair between Ernaux and an unnamed Soviet diplomat that began in 1988. The narrative, consisting of diary entries by Ernaux, explores concepts including love, lust and the fear of abandonment. This was Ernaux's second work related to the relationship with the diplomat; with the other work being the semi-autobiographical novel Simple Passion (which was previously published in 1991 in France).

== Plot ==
The love affair between Ernaux and the Soviet diplomat began in 1988 when the two first met at an embassy function in Leningrad. The two then had numerous sexual encounters in Leningrad and Paris over the next 18 months which were detailed in the book. In addition to these encounters, other parts of the book described Ernaux's fear of rejection as she awaited her love interest to return her calls. Ernaux also described difficulties working as a writer during the affair referring to her feelings at the time as an "Intense desire keeps me from working".

== Reception ==
Writing for The New York Times, Dwight Garner stated that Getting Lost: "is a feverish book. It’s about being impaled by desire, and about the things human beings want, as opposed to the things for which they settle." Garner further stated that the book is "one of those books about loneliness that, on every page, makes you feel less alone." Writing for The Guardian, Ankita Chakraborty states: "Like Anna Karenina and Madame Bovary, Ernaux’s affair should be counted as one of the great liaisons of literature". Writing for The Harvard Crimson, Carmine Passarella stated: "What could have been nothing more than a personal diary detailing a secretive and ultimately inconsequential mid-life love affair has, by virtue of excellent storytelling, become a representation of what it means to be human, in all of its embarrassing and reductive glory". The book was named as one of the best books of 2022 by the BBC as well as being selected as one of Time magazine's must-read books of 2022.
