= Happening (book) =

2000 novel by Annie Ernaux

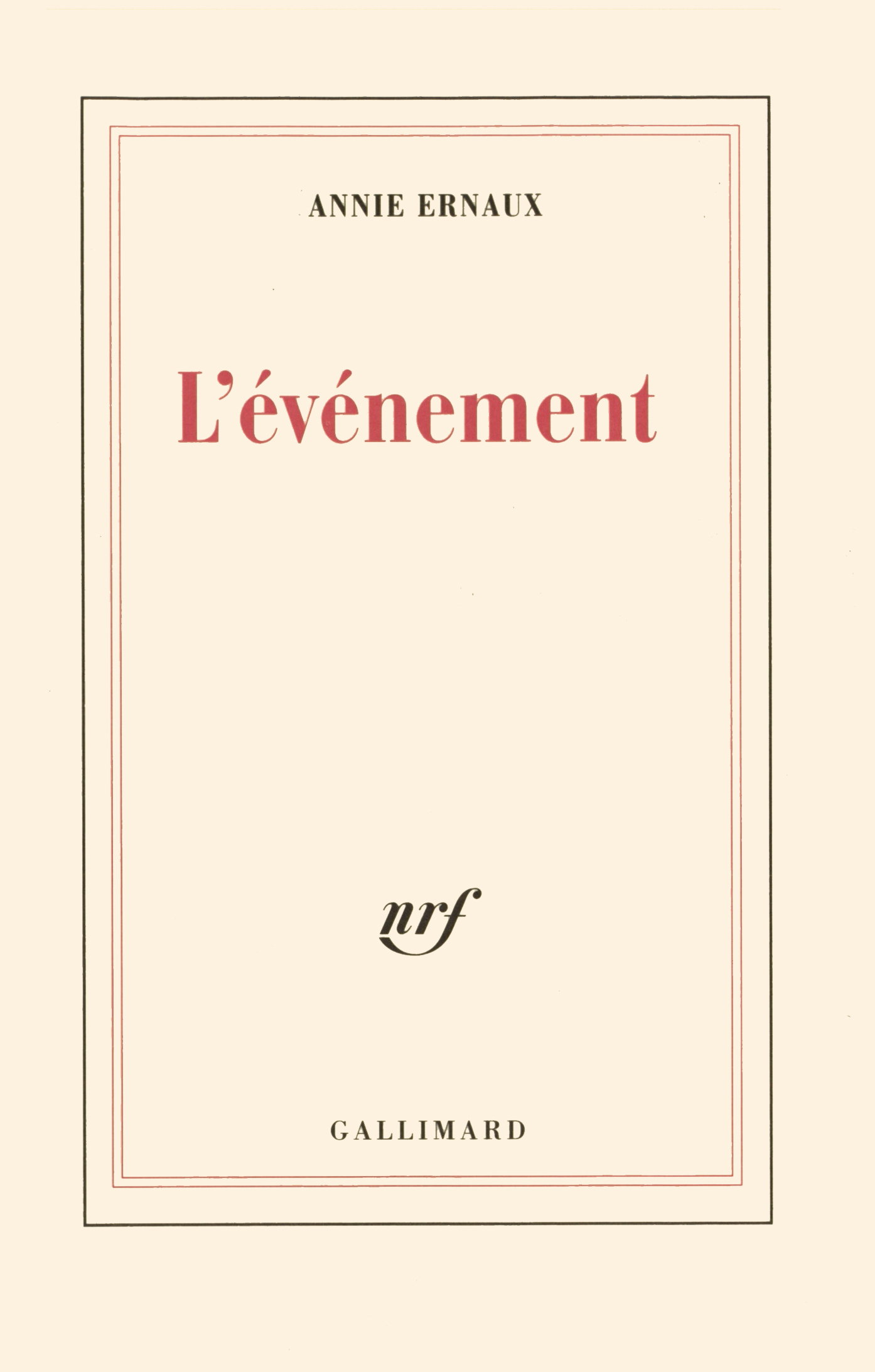
- Collection Blanche cover (first edition)
- Author: Annie Ernaux
- Original title: L'Événement
- Translator: Tanya Leslie
- Language: French
- Genre: Memoir
- Publisher: Éditions Gallimard
- Publication date: 14 March 2000
- Publication place: Paris
- English publication date: 2001
- Media type: Print
- Pages: 114
- ISBN: 978-2-07-075801-2
- OCLC: 43803401

Happening (French: L'Événement) is a 2000 memoir by Annie Ernaux.

== Synopsis ==
Set in 1963, four years before the legalization of oral contraception in France and twelve years before the Veil Act, the autobiographical narrative describes the troubles a young student faces when seeking out an illegal abortion. The story begins by depicting how she waited at Lariboisière Hospital for the result of a serology examination for HIV and how she "burst out laughing" as the result was "negative". Following this, she describes a similarly grueling experience of discovering her pregnancy and its consequences, such as hiding it from her parents and the public, searching for a doctor willing to perform an illegal abortion, confiding in a few close people for help, and enduring the horror of the abortion itself, which forms the rest of the book. Entries from her journal frame the events, covering the first three months of her pregnancy through the abortion and her recovery.

== Reception ==
Claire Devarrieux of Libération wrote that Ernaux's story "transcends individuality". Emily Eakin of The New York Times Book Review wrote, "As subject matter goes, little could be more inherently provocative. Ernaux's take is all the more so for being unabashedly philosophical rather than moral." Joy Press of The Village Voice wrote, "Ernaux connects her experience to the wider world of class and religion and law, resulting in a startling, unusual portrait of how a vagina really lives in the world."

== Film adaptation ==
In 2021, the book was adapted into a film of the same name, directed by Audrey Diwan. The film had its world premiere at the 78th Venice International Film Festival where it received the top prize, the Golden Lion.
