= Acadian architecture =

Traditional style of architecture used by Acadians and Cajuns

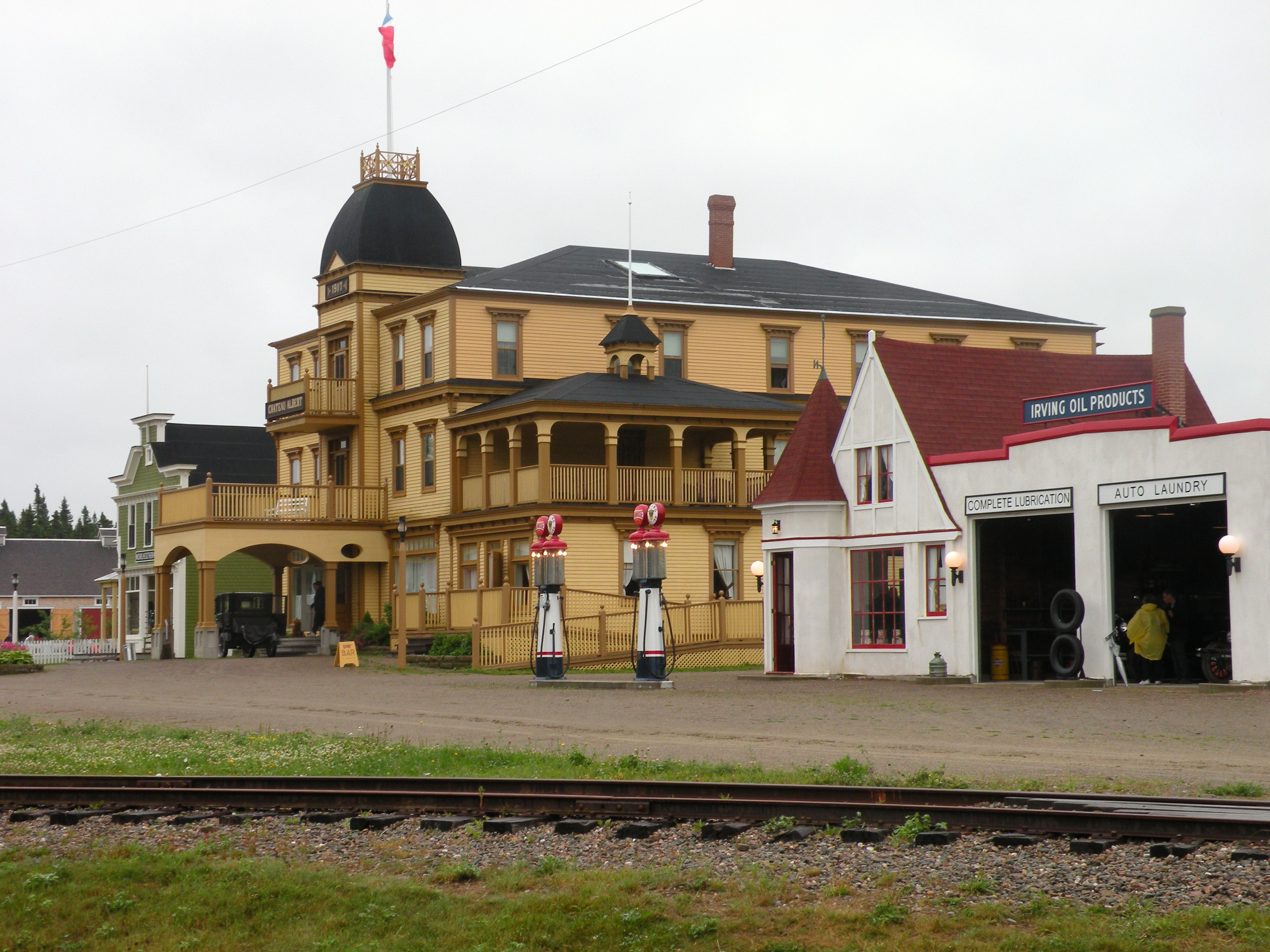
The Château Albert, designed by Nazaire Dugas in 1906, and the Irving Oil service station, designed by Samuel Roy in 1939.

Acadian architecture, also known as Cadien architecture, is a traditional style of architecture used by Acadians and Cajuns. (Note: The Cajuns, also known as Acadians, reside mainly in Louisiana, in the Southern United States, and form an ethnic group closely linked to the Acadians.) It is prevalent in Acadia (Note: The term Acadia is used to refer to the northern and eastern parts of the Canadian province of New Brunswick, as well as to more isolated localities in Prince Edward Island, Newfoundland and Labrador, and Nova Scotia. In a broader sense, the term "Acadia" is also used to refer to Acadian diaspora communities located in Quebec and the United States. People of Acadian descent are also found in France, the Falkland Islands, and the Antilles. Although not officially recognized, Acadia would constitute a nation by its language, culture, institutions, and symbols.) and, by extension, is employed for architectural purposes in the place.

The settlement of Acadia was established in 1604; the architecture was influenced by French design but adapted to the local climatic conditions and materials. Subsequently, Indigenous construction techniques were employed, primarily to improve house insulation. During the deportation of the Acadians from 1755 to 1763, most Acadian structures were demolished. For several decades afterward, hastily constructed homes of poor quality were built. Despite improving living conditions, the architectural style remained relatively unchanged until the mid-19th century, when French influence declined and American and English influences began to emerge alongside the careers of the first Acadian architects.

The oldest surviving examples of Acadian architecture are the De Gannes-Cosby House and the Sinclair Inn/Soullard-Skene House in Annapolis Royal, dating back to the 1700s, but the majority of surviving historical Acadian architecture date back to the late-18th to early-19th century post-Deportation era. Increasingly, municipalities are preserving their heritage, with several buildings having been restored or reconstructed in seven historic villages. However, no comprehensive study has been conducted on Acadian architecture, making it challenging to define a typical Acadian style. Nevertheless, some research is being conducted on existing buildings or during archaeological excavations, and in recent years, several buildings have been constructed with these findings in mind.

== Colonial architecture (1604–1755) ==
=== Early settlements ===
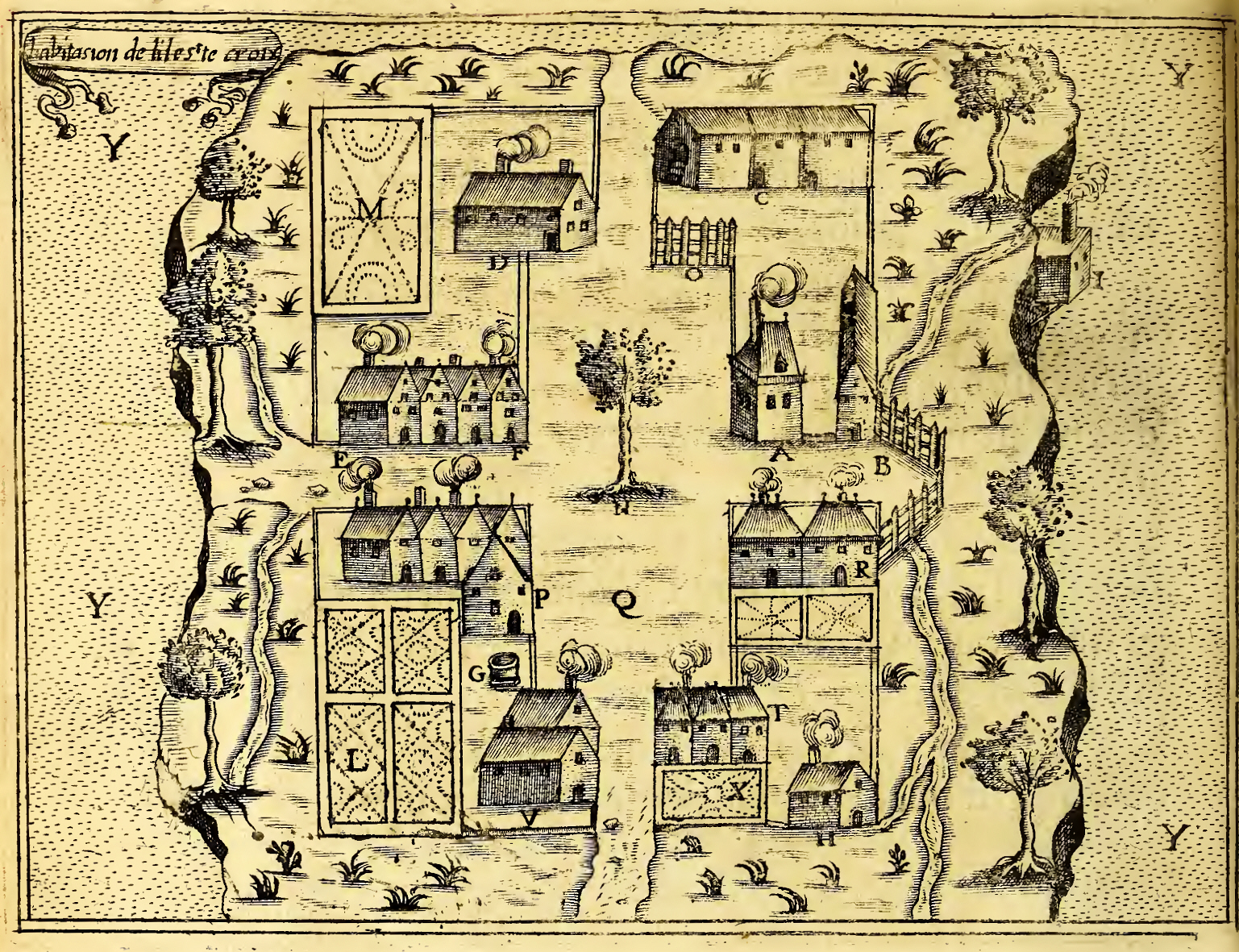
Sainte-Croix Island dwelling.

The first European settlers established themselves in Acadia in 1604 during the expedition of Pierre Dugua de Mons. The habitation on Saint Croix Island was founded, and a dozen houses were constructed and arranged to give the impression of a fort. The buildings were French-inspired, with their steep four-sided roofs. In 1605, following a harsh winter, the houses were demolished to salvage materials for the reconstruction of the Habitation at Port-Royal, which was rebuilt using the same architectural model.

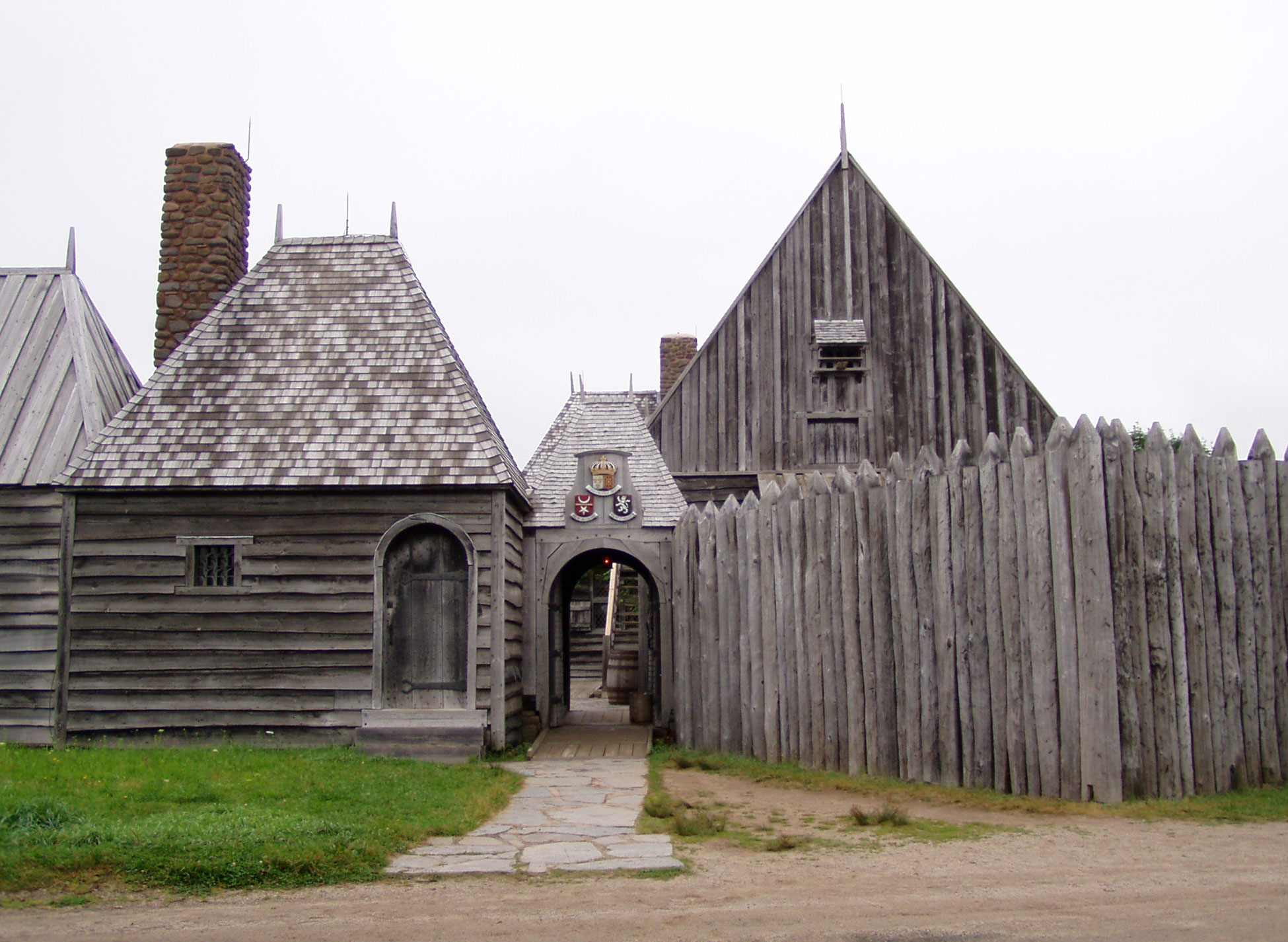
Habitation at Port-Royal.

=== Houses and farms ===
In 1632, Acadia was revitalized with the arrival of Isaac de Razilly, Menou de Charnizay, and Nicolas Denys, along with 300 elite men and three Capuchins, who departed from Auray (Brittany) France. The architectural designs they developed were influenced by French designs, notably the timber-framed houses. Local materials were used, mainly wood and sometimes stone for foundations, while bricks were rare. By the late 17th century, Acadians had adopted indigenous techniques to insulate their homes. One such method was the poteaux en terre, which involved planting posts in the ground and binding them with small branches. This process made walls sturdier and created air pockets for better insulation. The interiors were coated with mud or clay to fill gaps, while small exterior planks completed the insulation. Chimneys were made similarly to walls but coated with mud and clay to prevent fires. The dovetail joint was subsequently introduced. The construction of basic shelters involved two distinct types of assembly.

Four types of houses were constructed in Acadia at the time. The first was the timber-frame house, the very first method used at the Sainte-Croix Habitation. Another popular type was the piece-sur-piece house, built with squared logs stacked on each other, allowing for inexpensive and quick construction. This method was mainly used by new families or in remote areas without sawmills. By 1688, all the houses in Port-Royal were built this way and covered with thatch or plank roofs. A third type of house was built of cob. It consists of a framework whose spaces are filled with bousillage or bauge, made of earth and straw, all held in place by posts called palissons or palots, installed horizontally between the framework posts. (Note: Several ancient texts mention 'bousillées' houses, which could be interpreted as timber-framed houses. This is a similar technique, with the main difference lying in the spacing between the posts.) This technique originated in Upper Normandy and was likely imported by Abraham Dugas, who left Toulouse in 1640. His descendants disseminated the technique across various Acadian regions until the 19th century. At the turn of the 18th century, these houses were only paneled inside, leaving the bousillage and frame exposed outside. Some were coated with white clay on the exterior, a local invention. The fourth type of house was built with planks. Previously, it was thought that stone was rarely used in construction, but an unpublished study has revealed that stone and wood houses were common adaptations of French timber-framed houses. By 1704, Port-Royal had only one brick house, the Recollects' house, which was French-inspired.

=== Churches ===
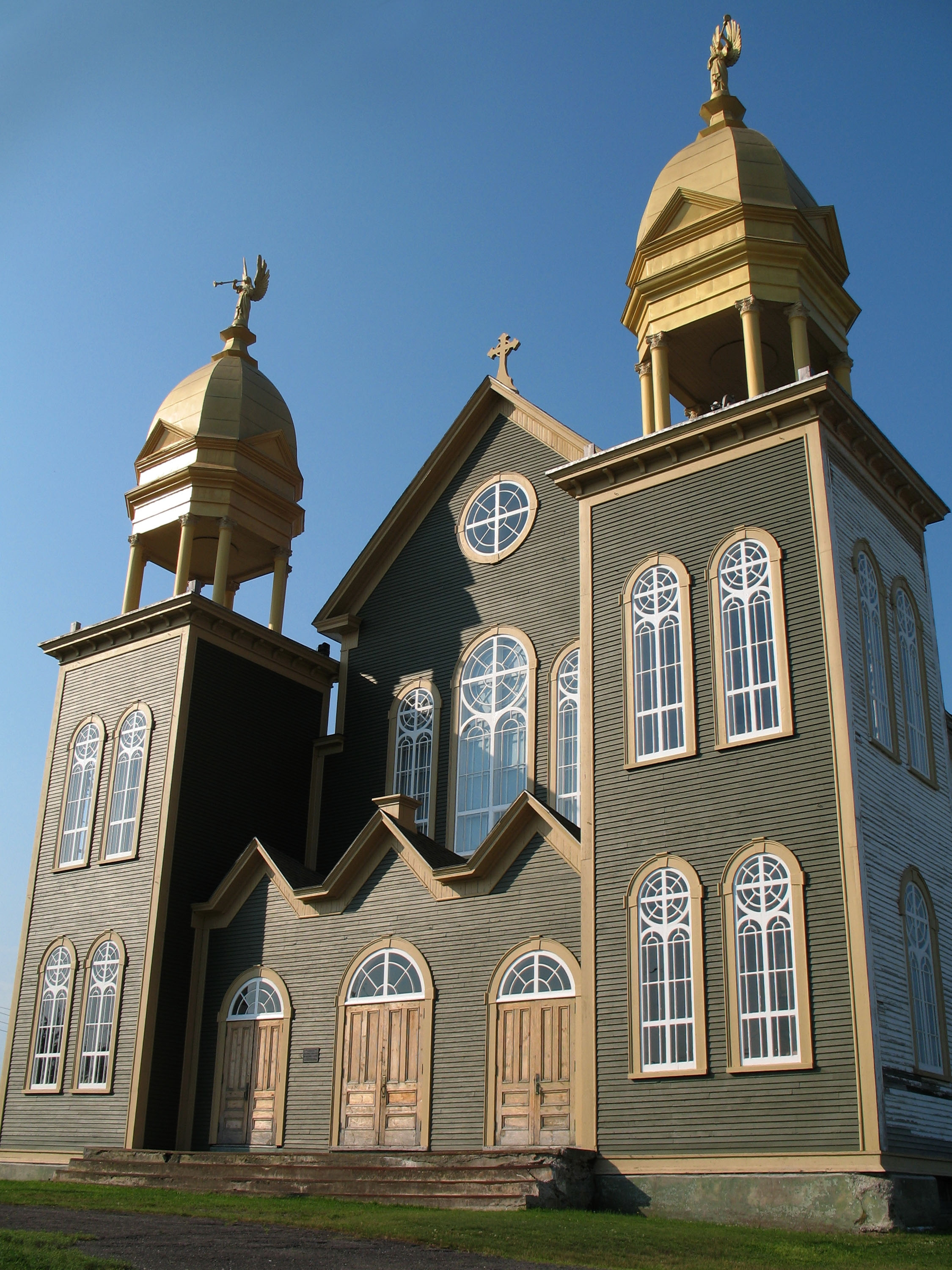
The Musée Culturel du Mont-Carmel Acadian site in Grand Isle, Maine.

The early Acadian churches were often constructed like houses and sometimes barns, exhibiting a combination of both architectural styles. They were characterized by a lack of bells and a reliance on drums or shells for summoning parishioners. At Port-Royal, the church used paper as a means of providing windows. However, this situation underwent a significant transformation around 1689, when Seigneur Richard Denys constructed his fort at Burnt Church. This fort was surrounded by a wooden palisade and several stone buildings, including the church. In approximately 1690, the Saint-Charles-des-Mines Church was constructed in Grand-Pré, which had surpassed Port-Royal in population. Recent excavations have revealed that the church's rectory was the only building in Acadia with a tiled roof, indicating its significance. Saint-Joseph-des-Mines Church was also renowned for its aesthetic appeal, featuring an interior adorned with wooden moldings.

== Domestic architecture ==
=== Precarious habitat (1755–1784) ===
==== Maritime provinces ====
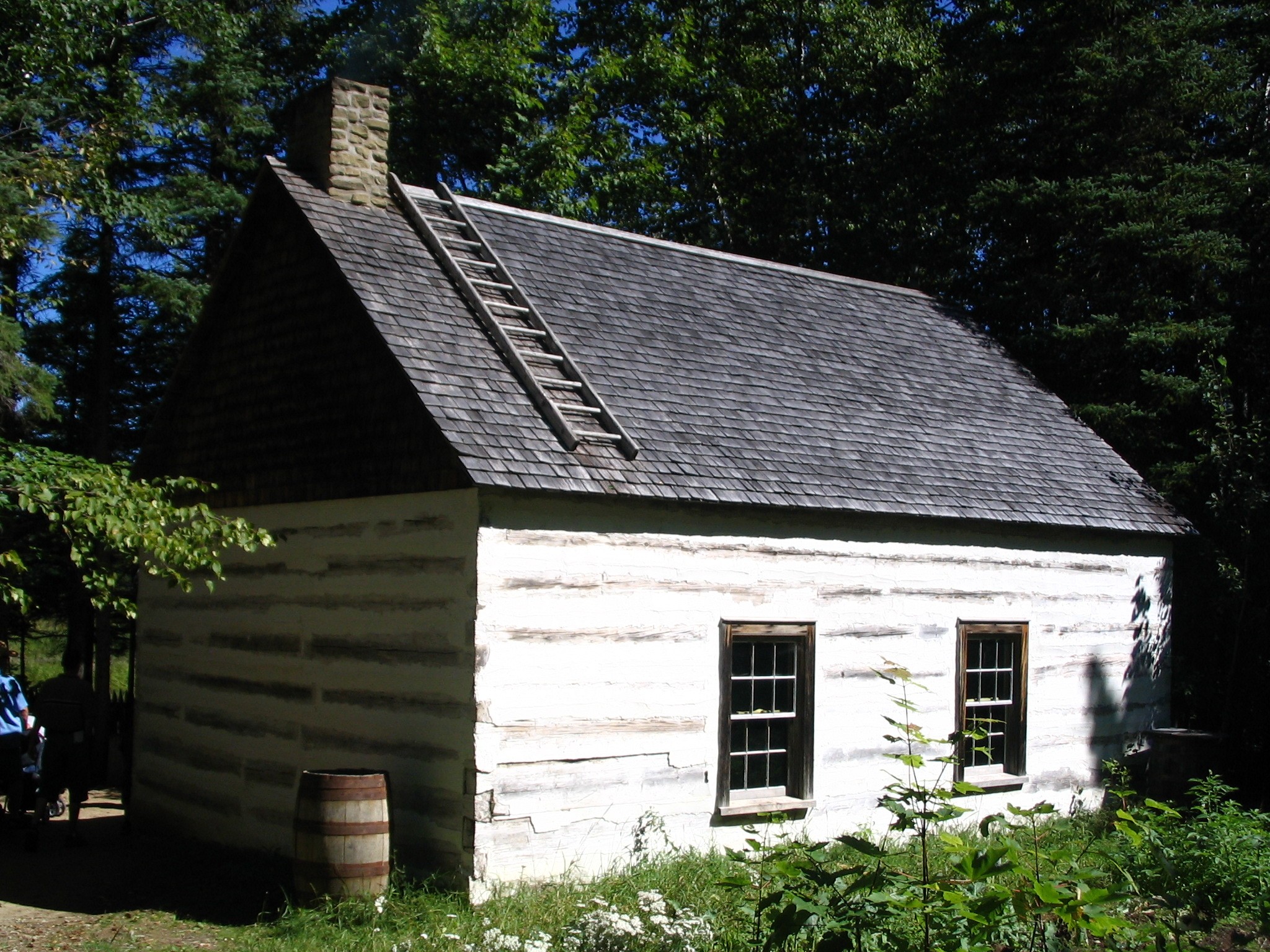
The Maison Martin was built in 1770 by Jean-Balthazar Martin near Sainte-Anne-des-Pays-Bas and moved to the Village historique acadien de la Rivière-du-Nord (VHA).

The deportation of the Acadians commenced in June 1755 with the fall of Fort Beauséjour to the British. Over the following years, numerous villages were destroyed, resulting in the termination of the prosperous, self-sufficient lifestyle that had previously existed. Until 1784, Acadians were persistently pursued by the British, and they were compelled to live without property titles.

The shelters and houses constructed during this period were hastily built. In 1761, Gamaliel Smethurst observed that after an attack on their village, the Acadians of Nipisiguit constructed shelters in two or three days. These houses were small, rectangular, and almost square, with a single room and three or four openings, including the door. They were heated by a masonry, a stone fireplace. The most prevalent architectural style was a piece-sur-piece construction, wherein squared wood pieces were joined using dovetail joints, a technique derived from American influences. Another prevalent style employed wood pieces joined by corner planks and a system of tenons and mortises. The floor was constructed from squared wood, occasionally comprising round logs or even packed earth. The roof was covered with shingles, and the walls were later clad in clapboards. The chimney could be constructed from fieldstone, wattle and daub, or flat stones bound with mortar. The chimney was typically situated in the center of the house, although when positioned on one of the gable walls, an exterior bakehouse was sometimes incorporated. Houses were inadequately insulated, with clay, moss, and cow dung serving as the primary insulation material. A loft, accessible via a ladder or occasionally a notched post, served as a storage area for hay and tools and, on occasion, as a boys' bedroom. In some instances, the first floor was partitioned off for the winter, with residents using the warmth of the loft.

Two characteristics emerged during this period to define Acadian houses: the headwall in the façade, which was one to one and a half meters high between the ground-floor windows and the cornice, and the gently sloping gable roof.

The principal tools employed during the construction process included the godendard (a large two-man saw), (Note: The "godendard" is a particularly large saw used by carpenters.) a handsaw, an axe, a hewing axe, a two-handled knife, and a pocket knife. Nails were rarely used, except for instances involving shingles. Treenails, and oak dowels, are used instead to join the parts; even the hinges are made of wood.

The furniture was utilitarian, typically of a modest height and devoid of embellishments. It was typically crafted by the user, often from pine due to its workability and abundance. Notches were made on the bench of the window frame to serve as a sundial. The fireplace served for heating, cooking, and often for lighting, which could also be done with tinplate or bowls filled with cod or elderberry oil.

==== Magdalen Islands ====
The Magdalen Islands, which now belong to Quebec, were colonized in successive waves, mainly by Acadians between 1755 and 1792. As was the case elsewhere, the first houses were provisional and were hastily constructed to replace them later with more comfortable houses. However, these houses served for a longer period than was anticipated and retained a rustic character for approximately a century. The initial construction of the houses was accomplished with the use of round logs, which were subsequently replaced by planks. These planks were caulked with moss and clay. The houses exhibited dovetail joints at the corners, although some houses, designated as "corner houses," were constructed with planks joined with wooden plugs. In subsequent periods, houses were constructed with planks split in two and installed vertically. These were tongue-and-groove structures, in which a groove was cut along the length of both sides of the plank and a lath was installed in one of the grooves, allowing the planks to be joined together. The houses were generally square, averaging six meters per side but no more than ten meters. Frequently, a lean-to was added, a smaller room built in the style of the house, used as a kitchen, dining room, and living room. A ladder led to the attic, where seeds and equipment were stored. A flat-roofed drum was often constructed at the entrance of the lean-to, serving both as a storage space and protection against the winter wind.

==== Louisiana ====
Approximately 3,000 Acadians were deported to Louisiana. Over a few years, they adopted elements of the Louisiana Creole culture and became the largest group, with other immigrants assimilating into them. They are now known as Cajuns. Some established ranches, or vacheries, while most remained small farmers. They constructed temporary shelters, supported by poles planted in the ground (techniques of poteau-sur-sole or poteau en terre), with roofs covered in palm leaves. The second generation of houses was generally of the pieux debout type, with cypress planks installed vertically in a trench, while the roof was French-inspired and covered with bark. The floor was always made of packed earth.

=== Recovery (1784–1840) ===
==== Maritime provinces ====
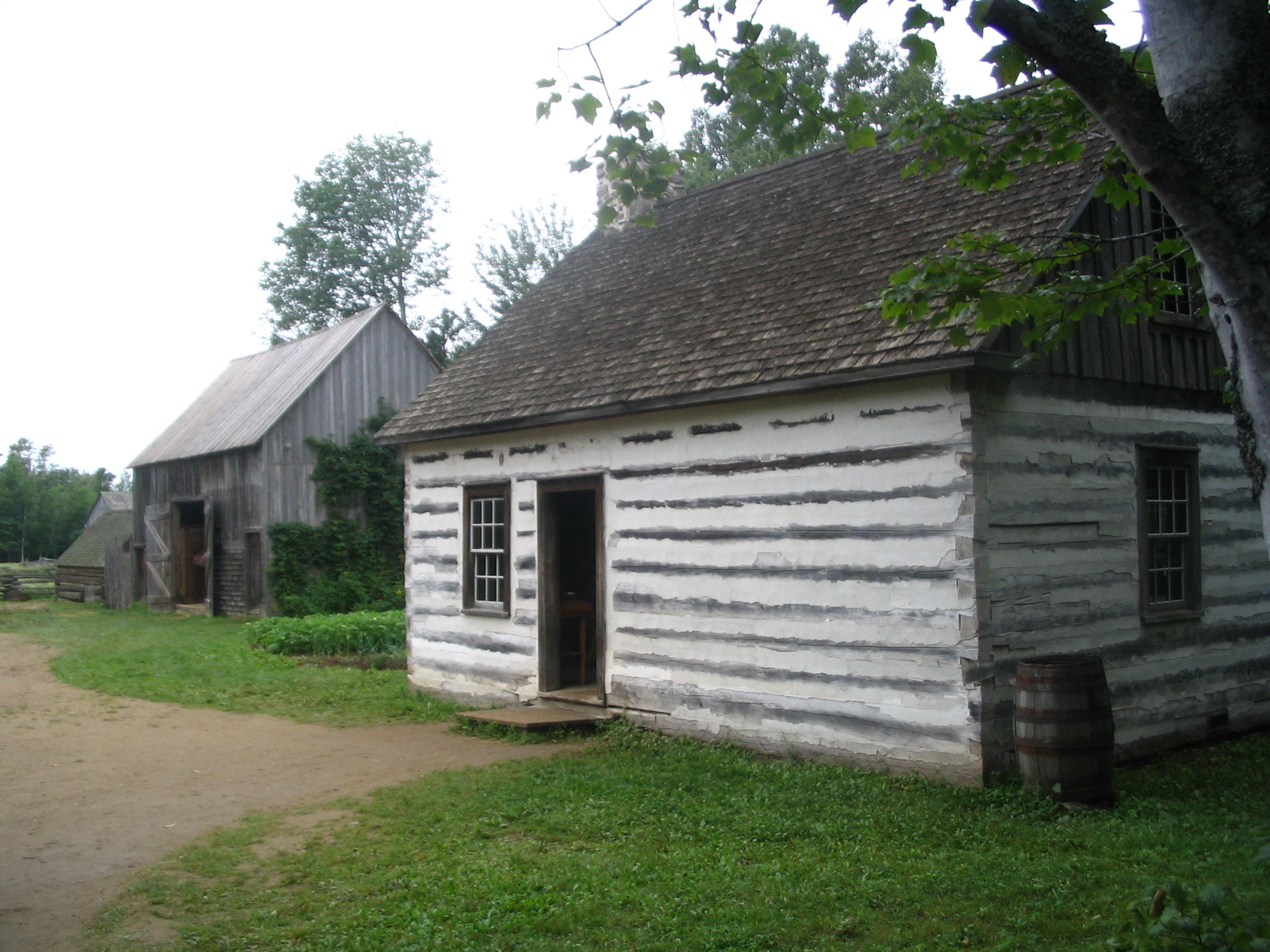
Mazerolle Farm, built in 1852, but typical of the living conditions of the time. It was built at Village-des-Mazerolle and moved to VHA.

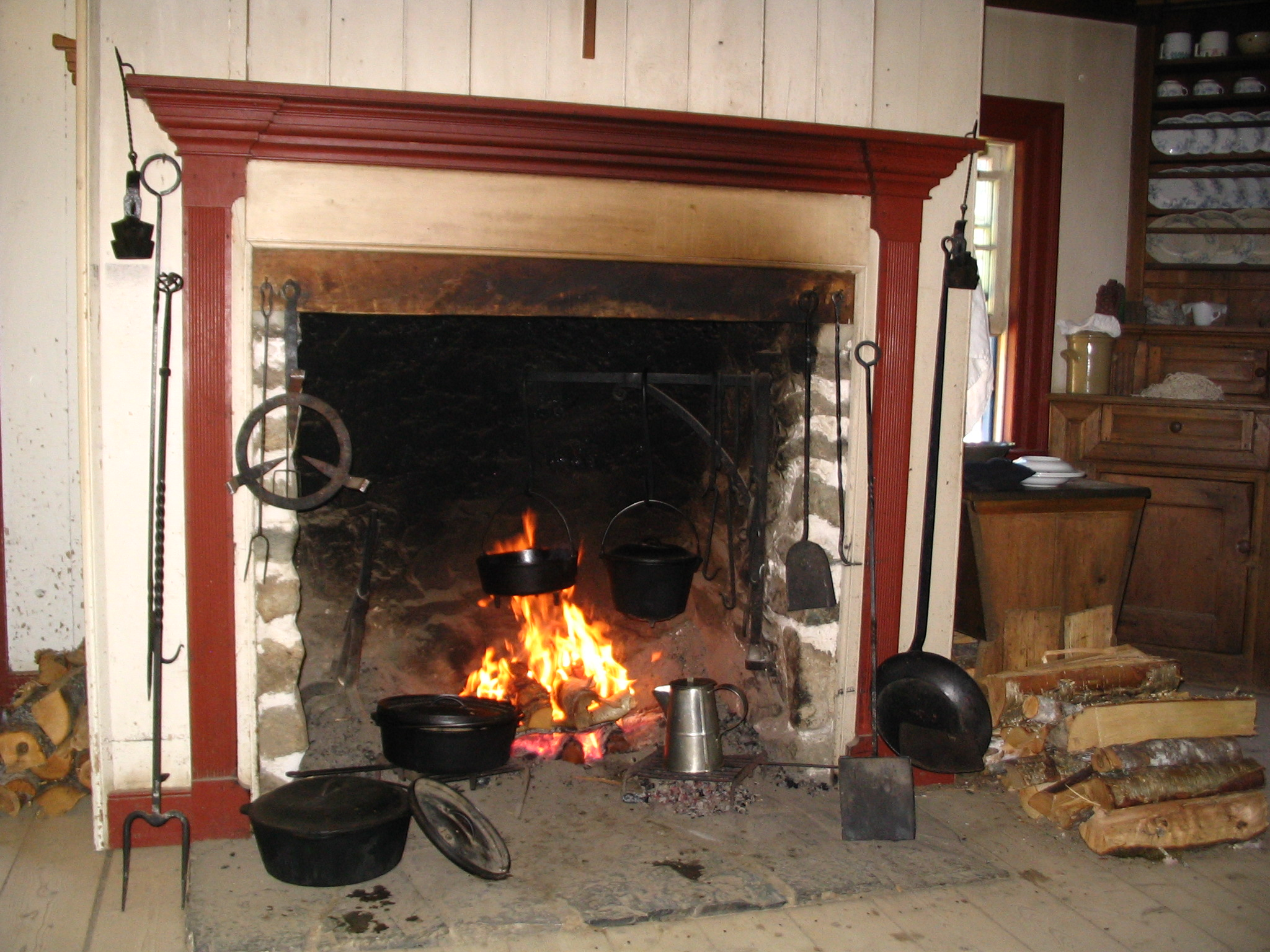
Interior of the Cyr farmhouse, built in 1831 in Saint-Basile and moved to the VHA. Note the corner cupboard on the right.

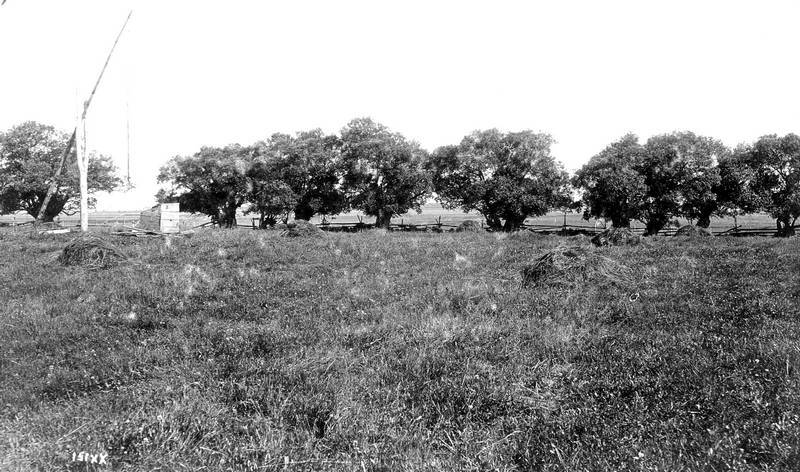
Grand-Pré willows, early 20th century.

The province of New Brunswick was established in 1784, at which time Acadian families were granted title to their lands. The population increased, and numerous villages and commercial enterprises were established. The appearance of the houses changed little and remained much less comfortable than those of English Canadians. The houses were still low, and some still had earthen floors. Although they still consisted of a single room, they were larger, having to be at least 20 feet by 16 feet in New Brunswick. The most significant innovation of the 19th century was the introduction of new tools and manufacturing methods. Sawmills were constructed, facilitating the use of planks and enabling the construction of more permanent houses. By 1840, nails had largely replaced wooden pegs and thorns in construction. The economy shifted from agriculture to fishing and forestry. Farm buildings were subsequently improved to enhance efficiency. Domestically produced candles began to be used for illumination, and tallow candles were introduced around 1820. Among the wealthiest families, heating was provided by a small square stove added to the fireplace, which was still used for cooking but began to disappear by 1825. This significant improvement allowed houses to be constructed with more windows and at least one partition, thereby creating new rooms. In the case of a house divided into two sections, the larger room was typically used as the kitchen, while the smaller section served as a bedroom where all family members slept. The exterior walls were typically covered with shingles, although some houses were still clapboarded. The roofs of these houses were steeply pitched and often thatched. An 1817 engraving depicts rather hipped roofs at the eaves and rectangular barns with very gently sloping roofs.

The variety of furniture increased, yet its overall design remained simple. Dressers were introduced, chairs replaced benches, and some furniture was crafted specifically for children. The corner cabinet was the most intricately constructed piece of furniture and reflected a desire for a more comfortable home. This piece was typically built into the wall and often harmonized with the moldings of the house. The windows were sash windows, generally consisting of twelve small glass panes, each measuring 15 centimeters per side. Curtains were constructed from newspapers, with the bottom portion cut to resemble fringe, a practice that persisted until 1930. Wallpaper was also produced from newspapers.

==== Madawaska ====
Madawaska was colonized from 1785 onwards by Acadians, as well as French Canadians and English Canadians. The inhabitants of the region were generally referred to as Brayons. The Brayons constructed houses that were similar in design to those found in other Acadian regions. These houses were small, with a single room and no more than two windows, and were built piece by piece using squared logs and heated by a single chimney made of stones bound with a type of clay mortar. Three methods were employed to affix the pieces of wood. The most prevalent was the post-and-plank technique, which used tenons and mortises. The second was the doghead technique or half-dovetail. The third technique, designated "stacked and pinned," entailed sawing the logs at the corners of the house, stacking them alternately one on top of the other, drilling two vertical holes in the logs, and affixing them together with long wooden pins. Only a few known houses were constructed in this manner. Upon their arrival, the settlers adopted Maliseet construction techniques, particularly the use of birchbark for insulation, both for houses and churches or sawmills. However, as soon as their settlement became more significant, the Acadians ceased covering their buildings with birch, and Maliseet influence in architecture disappeared around 1800.

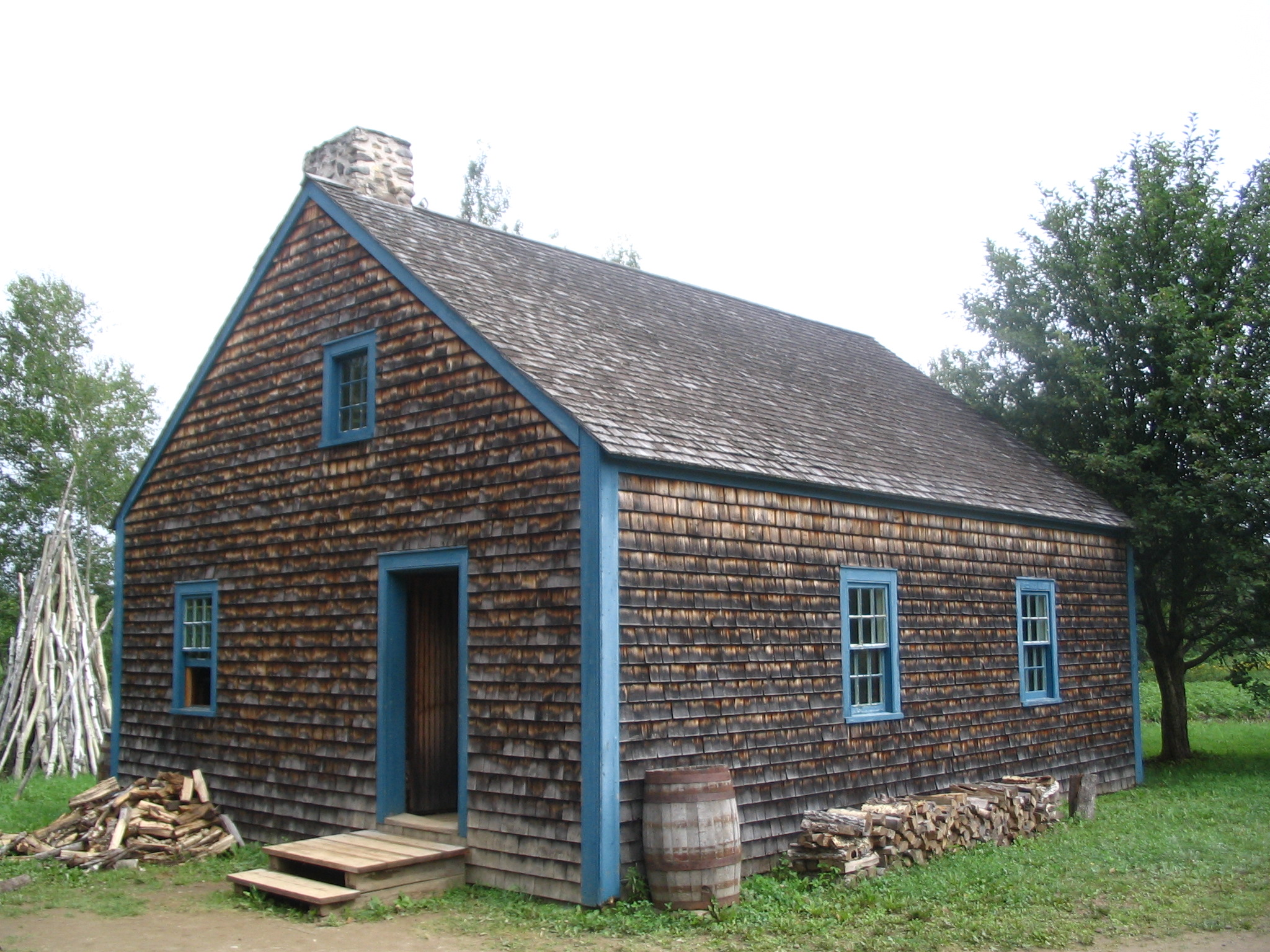
The Cyr farm dwelling.

Due to the favorable economic situation in Madawaska during the early 19th century, residential construction improved. In 1815, surveyor J. Bouchette observed that the majority of houses were well-constructed. In 1831, American census takers J.G. Deane and E. Kavanagh noted that some houses had up to two rooms, but rarely more, that most were paneled, and some were painted. Houses were constructed along the Saint John River until the mid-19th century when some were relocated to higher ground along the road. This presented an opportunity for owners to expand their residences or add one or two additional floors, using the original construction techniques. By the mid-century, houses typically exhibited a Georgian plan, comprising two rooms deep, a central hallway, a central chimney, one to one and a half stories, rarely two, and a simple gable roof. The exterior of the houses resembled those of large New England residences, with white-painted edges, neo-Greek-style pilasters, and cornices. Ceilings were often coffered, and interior moldings often echoed the exterior style of the house. The wealthiest families often covered their houses with vertical planks outside and sometimes inside as well, allowing for better insulation.

==== Louisiana ====
In the late 18th century, the Cajuns began experimenting with various types of mud-built houses. By the early 19th century, they had adopted three distinct architectural styles. The first, the Creole Acadian house, was particularly prevalent in the New Orleans region and along the Mississippi River. According to Milton B. Newton, this style was inspired by French houses in the Caribbean. It typically comprised two living rooms, with a central chimney made of clay and wood that opened onto both rooms. In most cases, each room had its exterior door, and two or three small rooms were situated at the rear of the house. These small rooms could be used as an office, storage, servants' quarters, or family bedrooms, particularly for children. A less common type of house had only one room, with the chimney leaning against one of the gables. A more common type of house was the proper Acadian house. According to Milton B. Newton, the Louisiana Acadian house was similar to the Creole Acadian house, with the exception that it lacked a porch and the garconniere (attic) was accessible by an interior staircase. A typical bourgeois Acadian house is the Acadian House Museum in St. Martinville, which retains the general plan while having an additional floor. Should the residents require additional space, a one- or two-room annex was later constructed at the rear or on one side. This addition took the form of a lean-to, created by extending the rear roof of the house, with the wimperg over the extension while maintaining a straight slope on the opposite side. Alternatively, the annex represented the main body of the house. A veranda was constructed along the entire length of the facade, integrated into the main body of the house. The roofing material, cedar shingles impregnated with pitch, was similar to that used in France. The entrance doors lacked a threshold, with the floor extending outside to form a porch. The garconniere, or attic, was accessible by an exterior staircase installed under the veranda. The house's facade was covered with whitewashed vertical planks, while the other walls were clapboarded but unpainted.

At least three differences exist between Creole and Cajun houses, symbolizing the tensions between these new arrivals and the established aristocracy. One of the reasons for adopting the gable roof, which was less popular among the Creoles, is almost certainly the fact that nearly all the houses in Acadia had gable roofs. Thus, for the emigrants, the gable roof represents and perpetuates part of their lost heritage. In Acadia, the attic was used as a sleeping area for boys, a practice that persisted in Louisiana. In contrast, the Creoles did not reside in the attic, deeming it uncomfortably hot. There was often no staircase leading to the attic. To transform the attic into a habitable space, the Cajuns installed expansive windows in each gable, which could be opened during sultry summer nights. They maintained the use of a steeply pitched roof to provide additional space. As soon as brick became a commercially available material in the mid-19th century, clay chimneys were replaced by brick chimneys.

In the early 19th century, the one- or two-room house with a front gallery and a gable roof became the standard among the Cajuns. These houses were constructed by hand, with squared wooden posts mounted on massive cypress joists. The roof was supported by a simple frame, in contrast to the complex Norman-origin frame used by the Creoles. The house was constructed with a foundation of two-foot-high cypress blocks, which were later replaced by brick pillars.

The rise in living standards during the 19th century led to an increase in the size and embellishment of houses, which were frequently constructed in the Neo-Grec or Second Empire style. In many instances, the original house was transformed into an outbuilding situated behind the new construction, which was positioned at the front of the property. Following the American Civil War, new houses were constructed using cypress planks, often sourced from sawmill waste. A prevalent decorative style between the 1880s and 1930s was the false gallery, which consisted of a roof extending beyond the facade and supported by consoles. Another distinctive feature was the facade with multiple doors, which facilitated improved ventilation during the summer months.

==== France ====
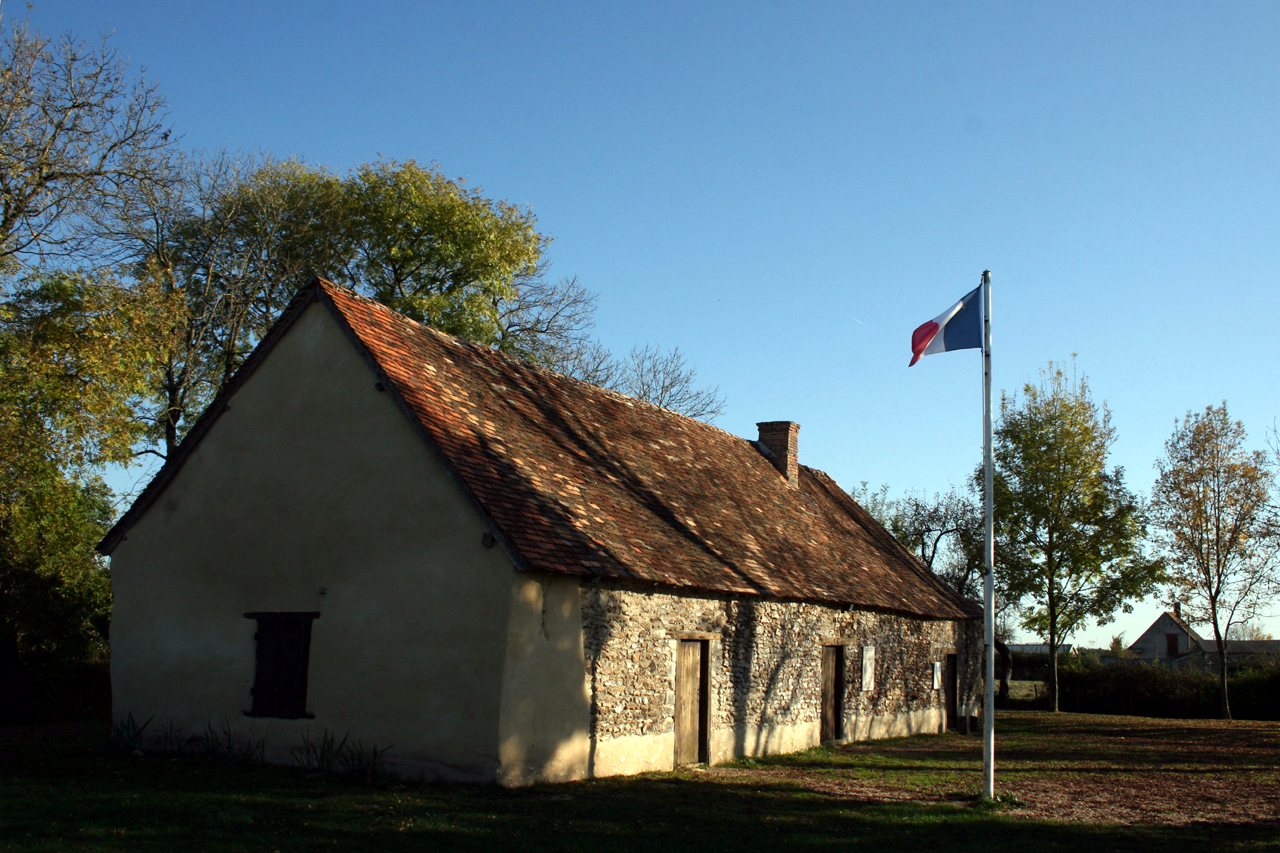
"Acadian Line" house in Archigny.

Following their deportation, some Acadians chose to settle permanently in France. Notably, they settled in Brittany on Belle-Île-en-Mer and in Poitou. In 1773, the Acadians arrived in Châtellerault and along the Acadian Line of Poitou (in Cenan, Saint-Pierre de Maillé, Archigny, and Bonneuil-Matours), where Marquis Louis-Nicolas de Pérusse des Cars, with the assistance of the government, settled them on his lands. A total of 58 farms were constructed along long, straight, and wide roads. The dwellings were inspired by local peasant constructions, yet they were not specifically Acadian. They were built according to the same rational plan, where the dwelling and outbuildings were connected in the same long building (or longère), yet they still had some organizational differences. There were two types of houses: one with a single room measuring 22 meters long and the other with two rooms measuring 28 meters long. Each house had a chimney and was designed for a family of 10 people. Due to the scarcity of available stones in the soil, Marquis de Pérusse conceived the idea of utilizing the distinctive earth of the Archigny-La Puye plateau, known as bornais. This earth was extracted on-site and then compacted between two formworks, mixed with water and heather twigs, and formed into a pisé or bousillis wall. Several houses were renovated or enlarged during the mid-19th century, and 38 of these structures still stand today.

=== Acadian Renaissance (1840–1880) ===
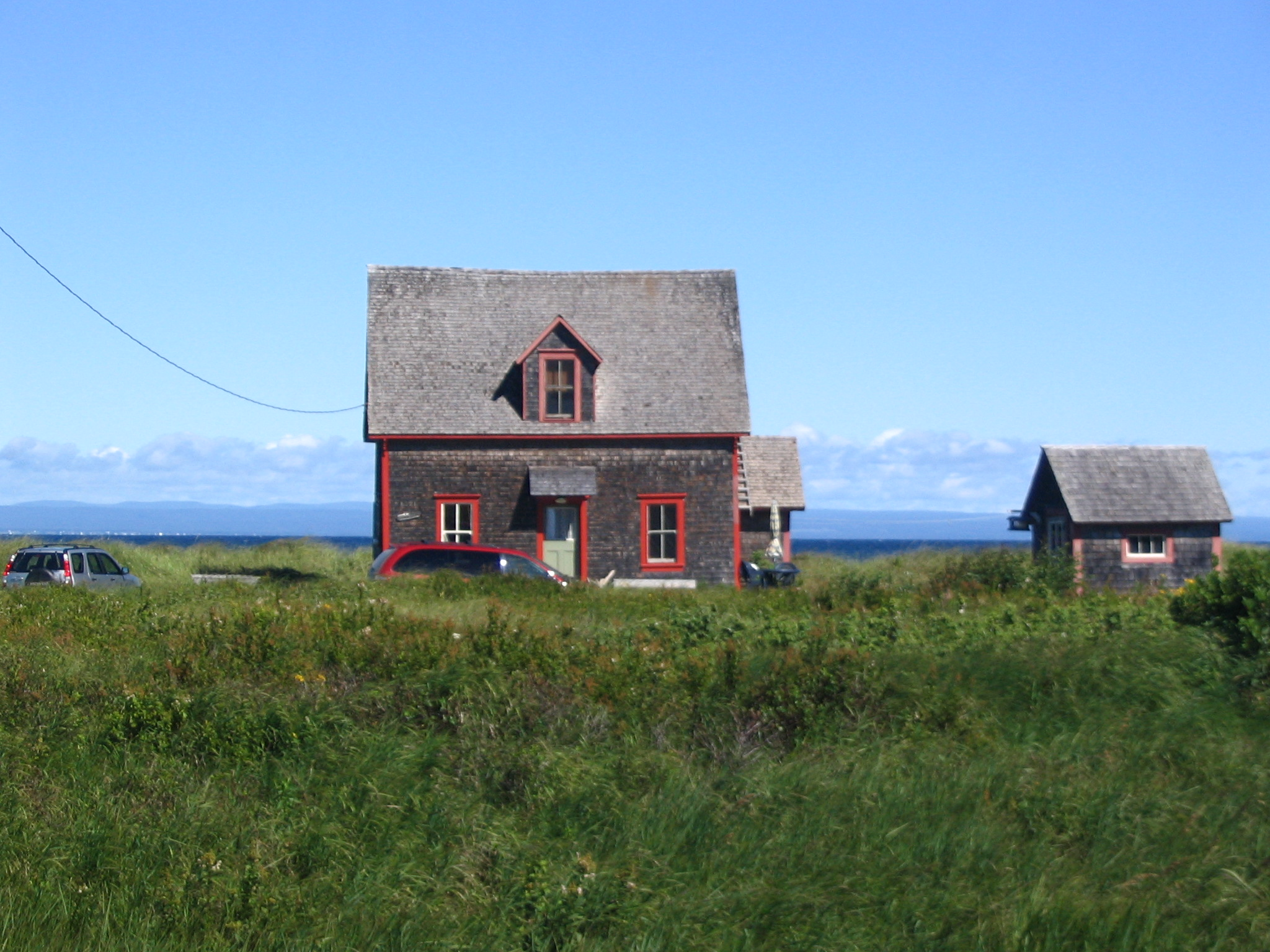
A simple Gothic Revival house in Anse-Bleue.

The Acadian Renaissance, which spanned from 1840 to 1880, was marked by the opening of Collège Saint-Joseph, the election of Amand Landry, and the founding of the newspaper Le Moniteur Acadien.

From this period onwards, the construction methods and appearance of houses were no longer determined by the availability of materials and tools, but rather by the lifestyle of the owner. Houses became more spacious, and the log construction method disappeared, except in some isolated villages. The most popular construction method was timber framing, covered with planks and generally with a stone foundation. This type of construction allowed for even larger houses, with each room now built for a specific use. In particular, around 1860, the large kitchen was divided into two, forming a kitchen at the back of the house and a small living room facing the main entrance. This new room was borrowed from English Canadians. Interior walls were increasingly plastered to make them more attractive and easier to maintain. Various types of doors were now used. Henceforth, the kitchen door was most often placed opposite the entrance door. The staircase, generally located in the kitchen, became more elaborate. The configuration of stairs remained consistent, with the first two steps leading to a landing where a door provided access to the remainder of the stairs. The trapdoor leading to the cellar remained in the kitchen, situated near the stairs. Around 1850, the square stove was replaced by the double-deck stove, also known as the French stove or the more expensive Star stove. These stoves were used for both cooking and heating. The majority of residences were equipped with two stoves, one in the kitchen and the other upstairs. Some dwellings began to be illuminated by paraffin lamps.

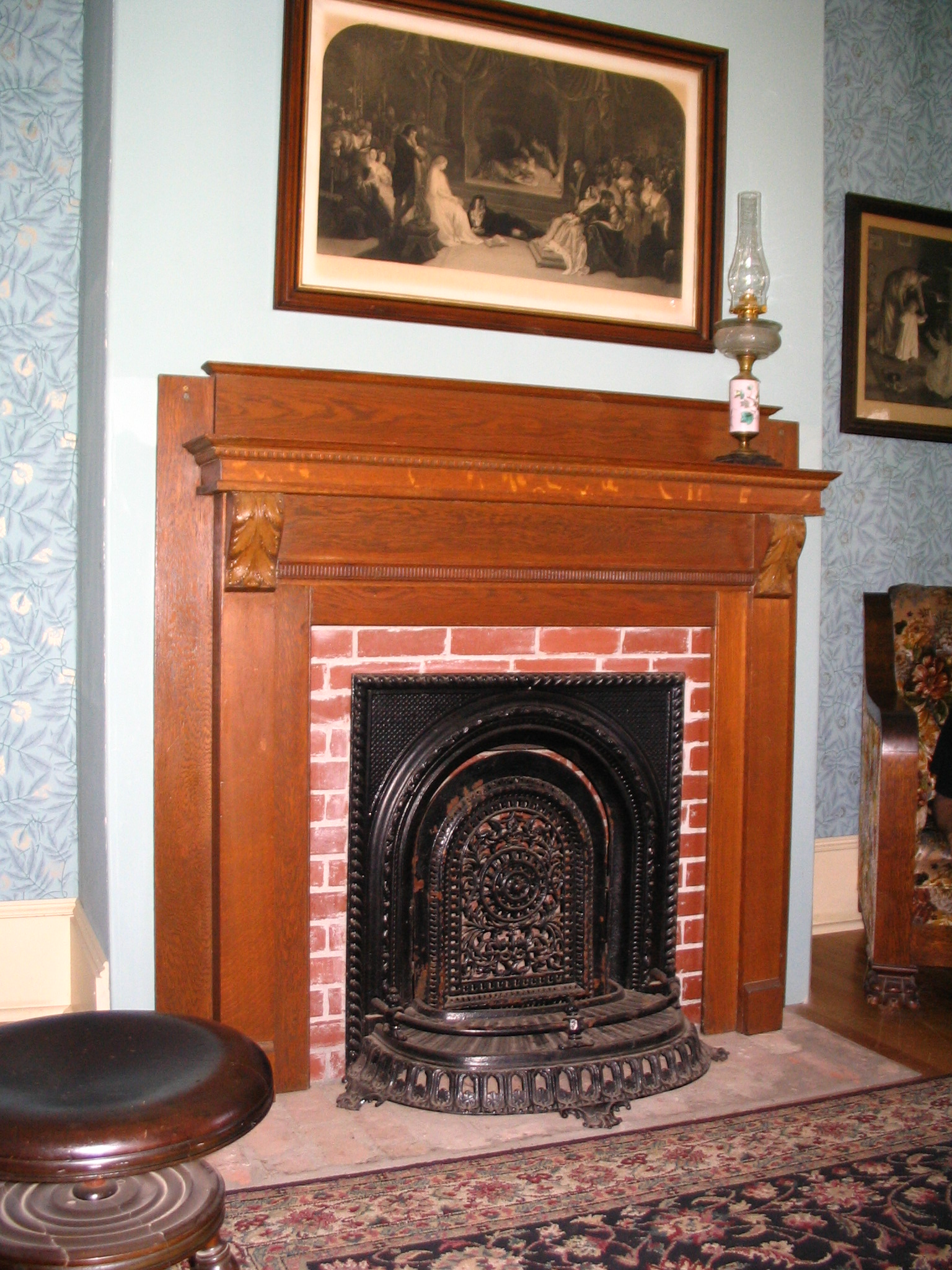
O. Turgeon Home Show, at the VHA.

Acadian houses exhibit both distinctive characteristics and similarities to English houses in the Maritimes. However, there are also some minor differences in the framing. This could be attributed to an adaptation of English construction techniques, but this explanation seems unlikely due to the isolation of many villages by the late 18th century. Moreover, the Acadians were renowned for their expertise in carpentry and would have provided inexpensive labor in the construction of English-speaking houses. In any case, Acadians in the 19th century viewed Canadian-English or American architecture as a sign of prosperity and adopted their decorations, albeit more modestly. Existing houses are elongated and galleries are added. In the first half of the century, several houses in the neoclassical style are built. They are generally simple, not as decorated as in the United States, but retain the overall layout. A few rare, more elaborate examples of this architectural style exist, such as the former presbytery of Baie-Egmont. In the second half of the century, the neoclassical aspect of some houses was complemented by the addition of cladding, pilasters, and cornices, while small-paned windows were replaced by four-paned windows. Other houses were renovated in a neo-Gothic style, clad in cladding and featuring more decorative frames and corner boards. The fundamental element of this architectural style is the dormer, which is often continued from the facade wall, traditionally on the long side of the house. The dormer is usually positioned opposite the main entrance, although more elaborate constructions often have two, installed on each side of the door. New furniture is introduced, sofas are upholstered, and walls are decorated with portraits.

Despite the enhanced quality of life, the space economy remained a fundamental aspect of the household. For instance, a cupboard was constructed beneath the stairs, and the expanded attic became a habitable room.

=== 1880–1960 ===
The final Acadian-style house in Louisiana was constructed in 1911. After this, the Cajuns erected brick bungalows on concrete foundations, or mobile homes, which were similar in design to the houses of other Americans.

Pascal Poirier posits that late 19th-century houses in the Maritime provinces were constructed with gently sloping roofs. He further asserts that small one-room houses with steep roofs were largely supplanted during the 1920s, with only a few impoverished villages retaining their architectural legacy. These vestiges of French influence in architecture represent the final remnants of a bygone era. While traditional architecture did not disappear entirely, with the continued use of cedar shingles and galleries, houses were now heavily influenced by fashionable styles in the United States and marked by their eclecticism. A frequent decoration at the time was the corbels installed under the cornice. American colonial-style houses were built towards the end of the century, characterized by their hip roofs, large size, symmetrical fenestration, and two-story square plan. The residence of Dr. Bourgeois, constructed by Acadian architect René-Arthur Fréchet in Tracadie in 1938, exemplifies the Foursquare style, a prevalent architectural style during the first half of the 20th century, particularly in this town. At the turn of the 20th century, two common elements were the "L" plan and the steeply pitched roof with a dormer. The Queen Anne style was the most popular among wealthy families at the time. The house built by the Olivier-Maximin Melanson family in Shediac in 1898 is characteristic of the style, featuring a truncated roof, a veranda on two sides, an octagonal tower, and projecting bays. The Neo-Gothic style remained the most popular until the early 20th century. The Château d'Acadie, constructed in 1939 in Tracadie-Sheila, represents a singular instance of the Château style, characterized by its irregular form, stone walls, hip roof with a steep cross gable, and dormers that disrupt the roofline. With the pervasive adoption of automobiles in most communities from the 1940s onwards, the primary entrance became a rarely used feature, often serving merely as a decorative element.

The establishment of the Canadian Confederation had a detrimental impact on the economic situation of Acadians in the Maritime provinces. To mitigate these effects and liberate the population from the control of fishing companies, the clergy initiated the establishment of new agricultural villages in 1875. The architectural style employed a century earlier was resumed. In response to the economic downturn of the Great Depression, villages such as Allardville were founded, where settlers relocated on foot with their tools and initially constructed branch shelters, subsequently erecting simple plank houses.

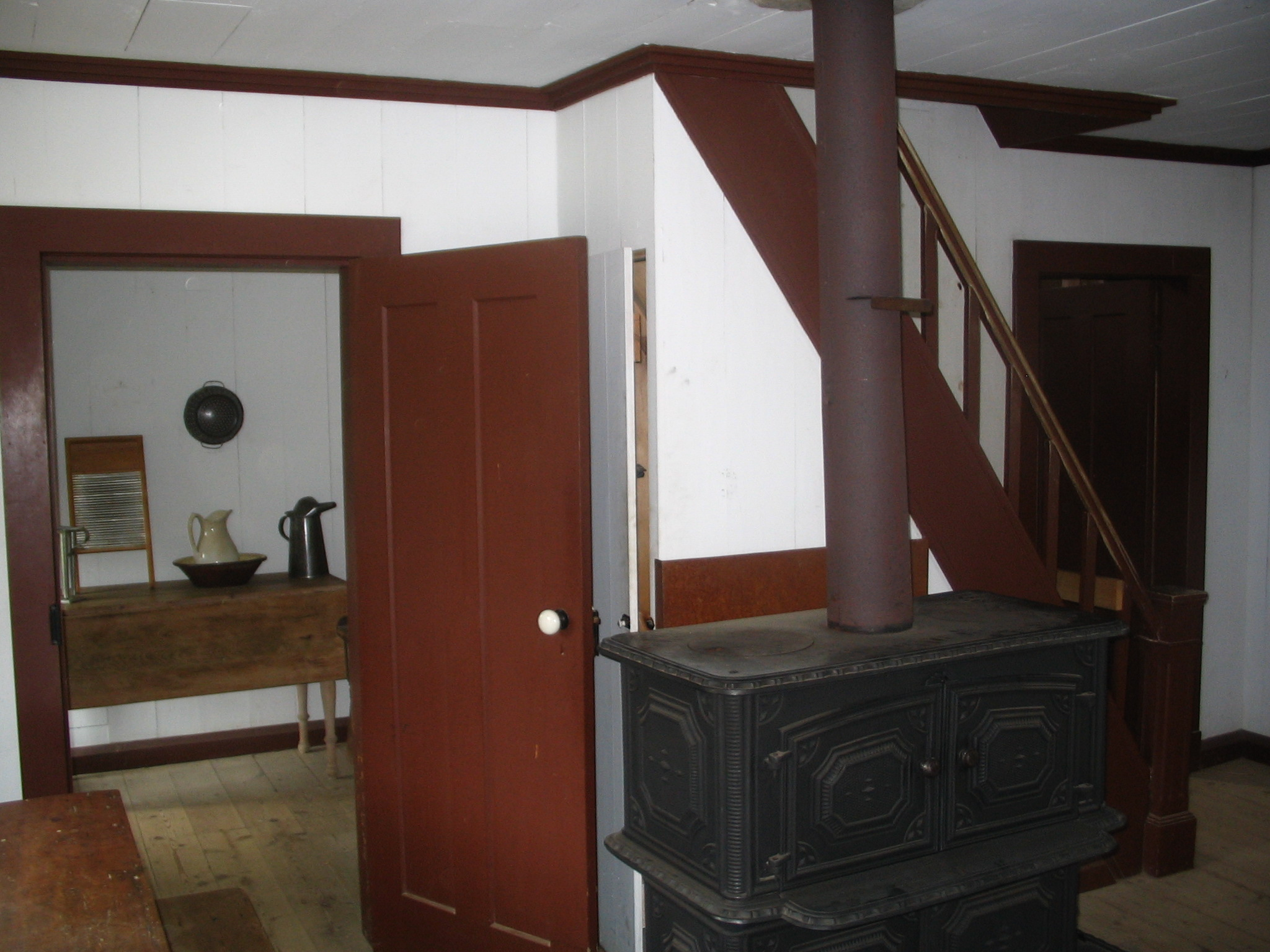
Interior of the Thériault house, built in 1890 in Bertrand and moved to VHA.

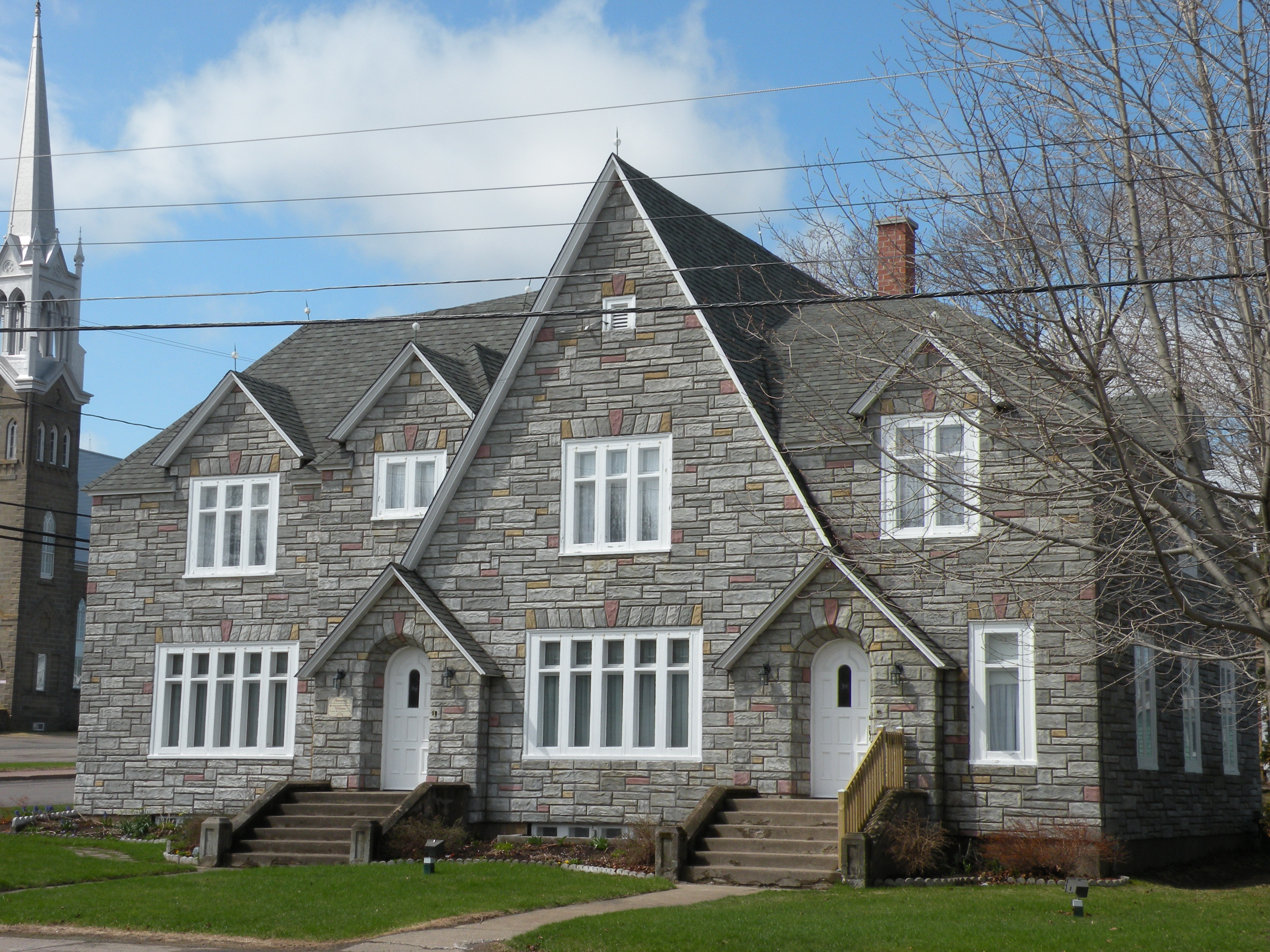
Château d'Acadie (1939).

== Religious architecture ==
Following the deportation, mass gatherings were held in private residences. The first Catholic parish in the region that would become known as "New Acadia" was established in 1781 in Memramcook. At the same time, the first chapels and churches were erected. One of the earliest large churches was Saint-Henri de Barachois, currently the oldest wooden church in New Brunswick. Constructed in 1824, the building displays a fusion of Gothic, Neo-Gothic, Neo-Renaissance, and classical elements, foreshadowing the architectural trends that would emerge in subsequent decades.

As the population increased, churches were enlarged or rebuilt, thereby differentiating themselves from other buildings and drawing inspiration from various European religious architectural styles. Some churches incorporated neoclassical elements, such as those in Arichat or Sainte-Marie Church in Church Point. In addition, some churches adopted the Byzantine style, including Saint-Ambroise in Yarmouth (1890) and the Immaculate Conception Church in Pobomcoup-East (constructed in 1877, enlarged in 1910). Romanesque-style churches also emerged, such as Saint-Michel in Wedgeport (built in 1867, enlarged in 1913), and neo-Gothic examples like Sainte-Agnès in Quinan (erected in 1885). Several Baroque churches were eclectic, such as Saint-Pierre de Chéticamp and Saint-Isidore Church, which display Baroque interiors and other styles externally. The interiors of churches such as Saint-Pierre de Pobomcoup-West and Sainte-Cécile on Lamèque Island exemplify the integration of multiple architectural styles. The Bellotiste style, which was prevalent in Quebec from the 1940s to the 1960s, exerted a notable influence on some Acadian churches, with Saint-Jean-Baptiste Church in Bouctouche serving as a notable illustration.

In 1840, following a period of economic and social crisis, the residents of Memramcook and Saint-Anselme constructed new, substantial churches. At its inauguration in 1855, Saint-Thomas Church in Memramcook attracted a congregation of 50,000. This impressive turnout inspired the Micmacs of Beaumont to build Saint-Anne Chapel. Several Acadian churches also distinguished themselves from others in terms of their size. Sainte-Marie Church in Pointe-de-l'Église was claimed to be the largest wooden church in North America, while Saint-Pierre-de-la-Vernière in Îles-de-la-Madeleine was the largest in Quebec and Saint-Simon in the village of the same name was the largest in New Brunswick.

The prevalence of poverty in many communities led inhabitants to develop ingenious techniques. For instance, the first church in Saint-Antoine was adorned with silk handkerchiefs from the villagers, while the old churches in Barachois and Cap-Pelé had broken-neck glass bottles installed in the walls to enhance acoustics. The Richibouctou-Village chapel subsequently became the sacristy of the new church, while the Néguac chapel was divided in 1846, with its facade becoming the sacristy of the new church and the remaining portion transformed into a residence. The Notre-Dame-de-l'Assomption Church in Pré-d'en-Haut was constructed in 1935 in a relatively simple architectural style. The interior walls were finished in pressed cardboard, and the pews were sourced from Saint-Thomas Church in Memramcook.

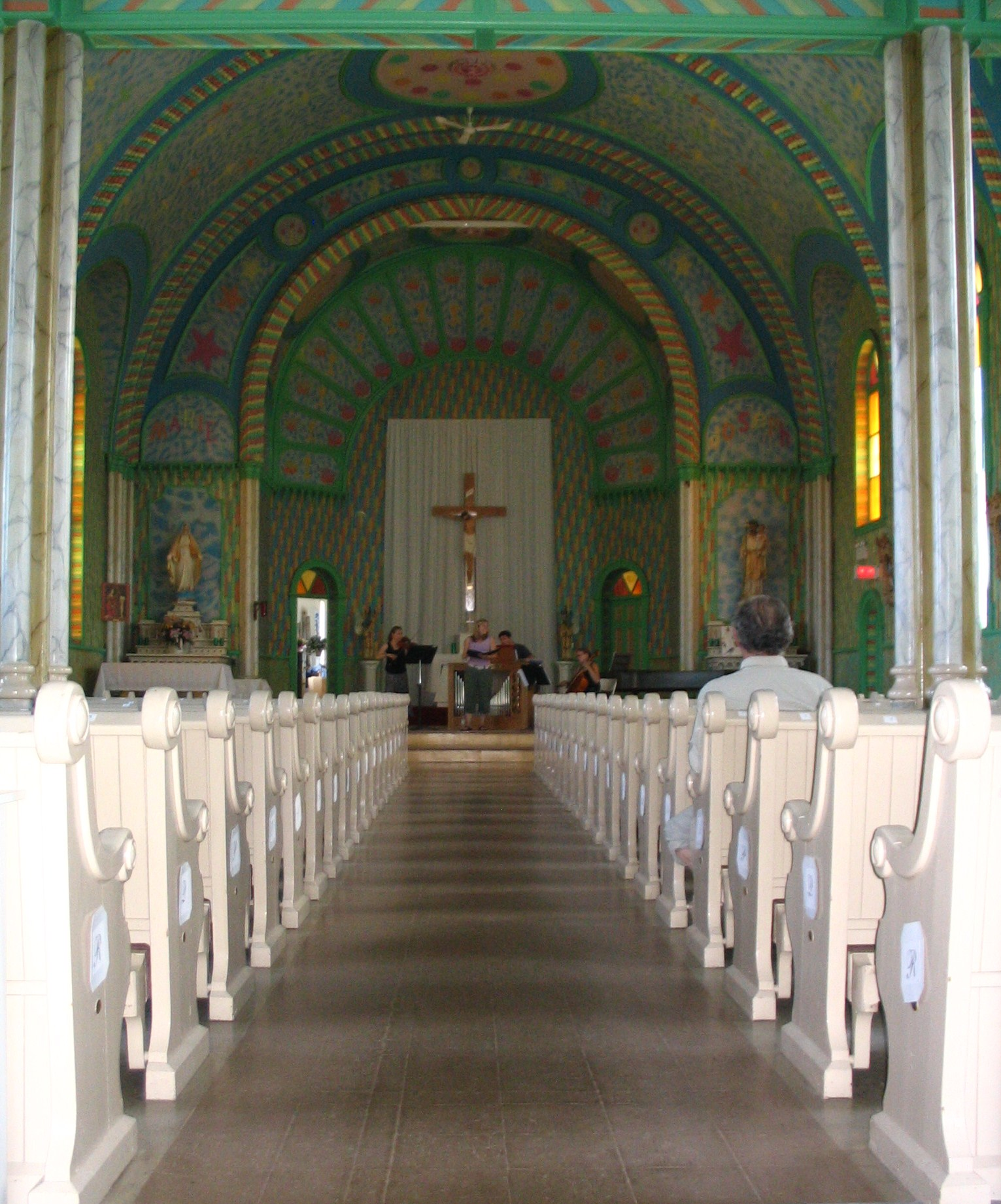
Interior of the Church of Sainte-Cécile, built in 1813, but whose more recent decoration has earned it the nickname of "candy church".

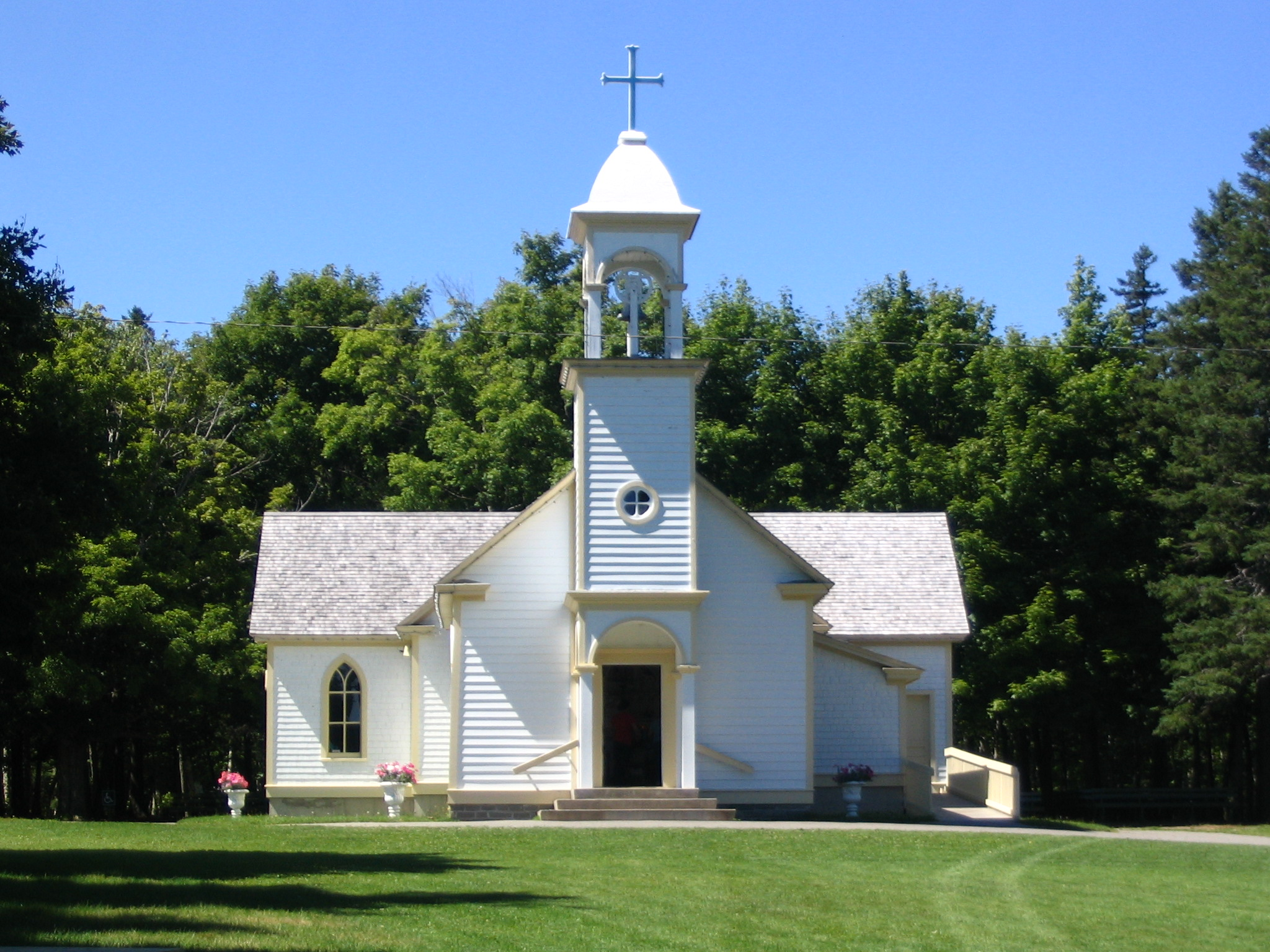
The Sainte-Anne-du-Bocage chapel in Caraquet (1818).

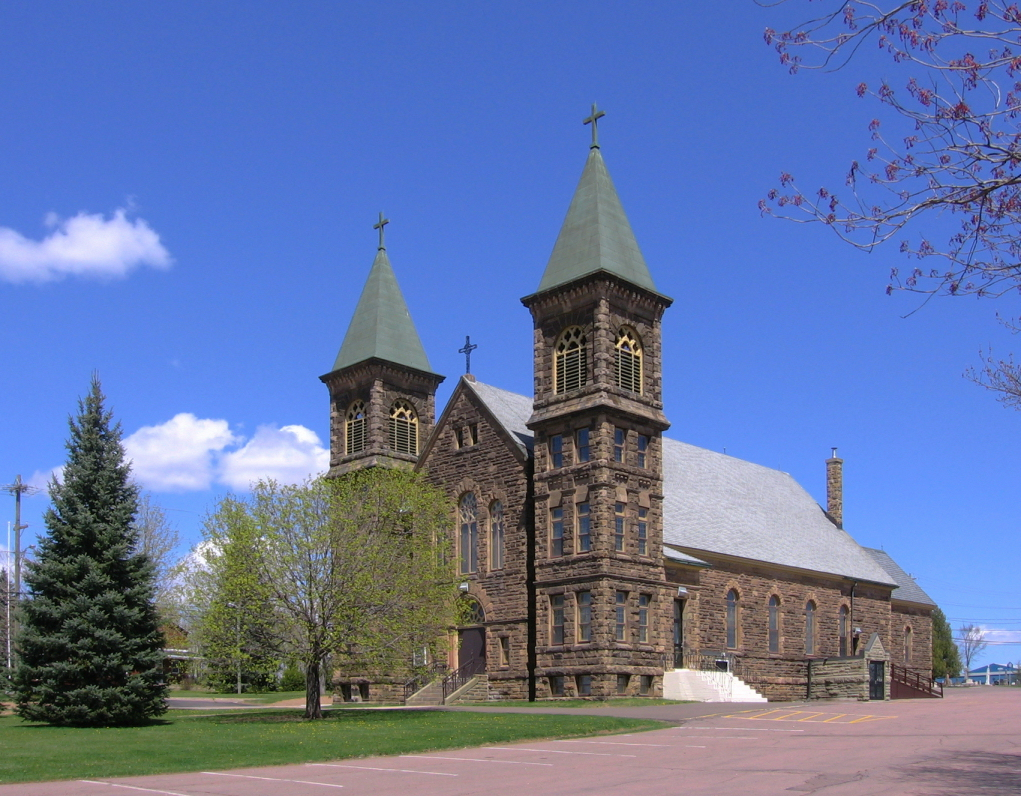
Saint-Anselme church, Dieppe (1840).

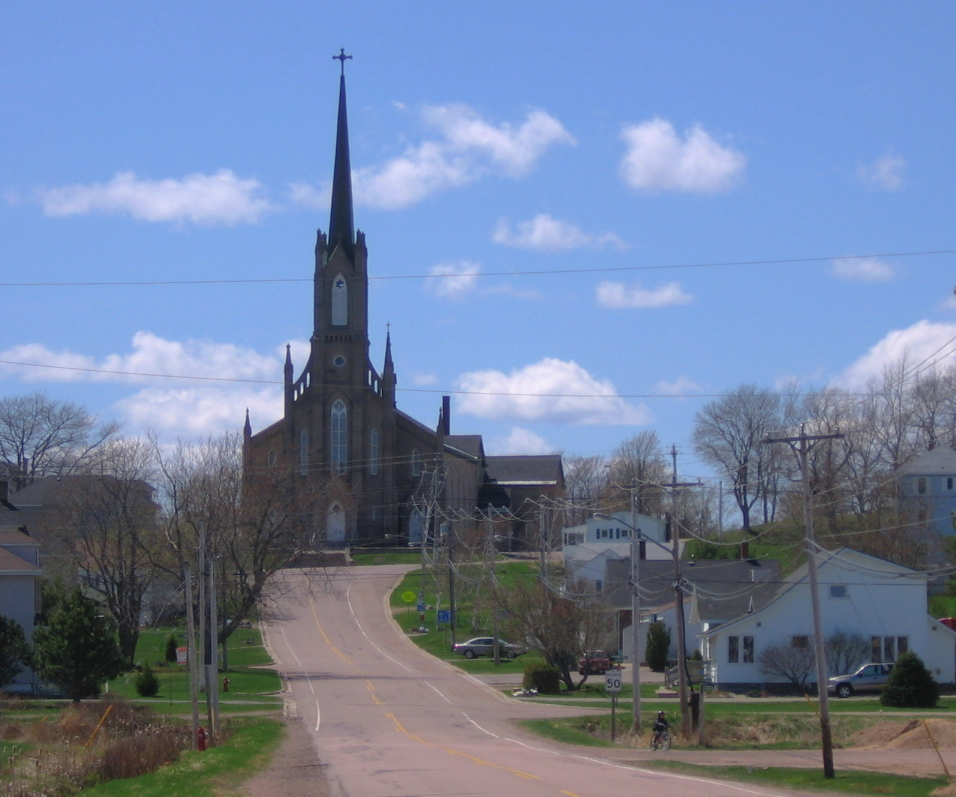
Saint-Thomas de Memramcook church (1840–1855).

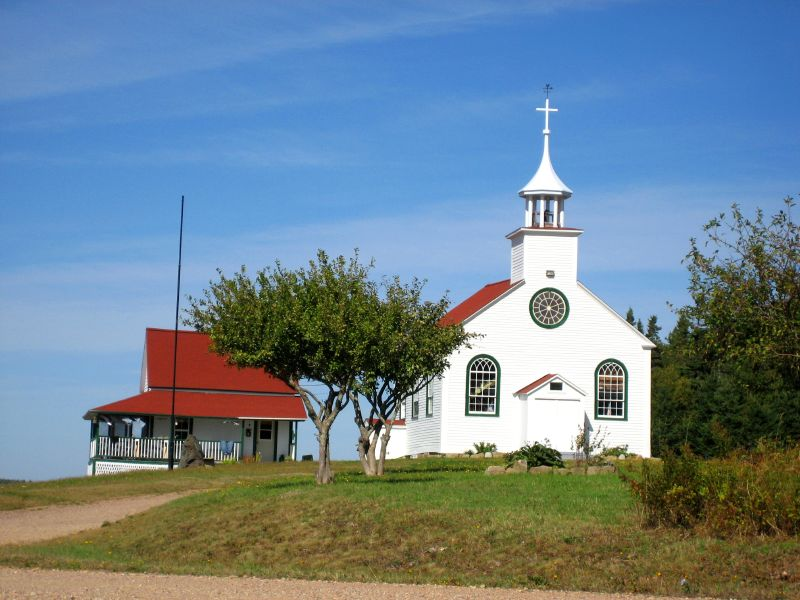
Sainte-Anne de Beaumont chapel (1842).

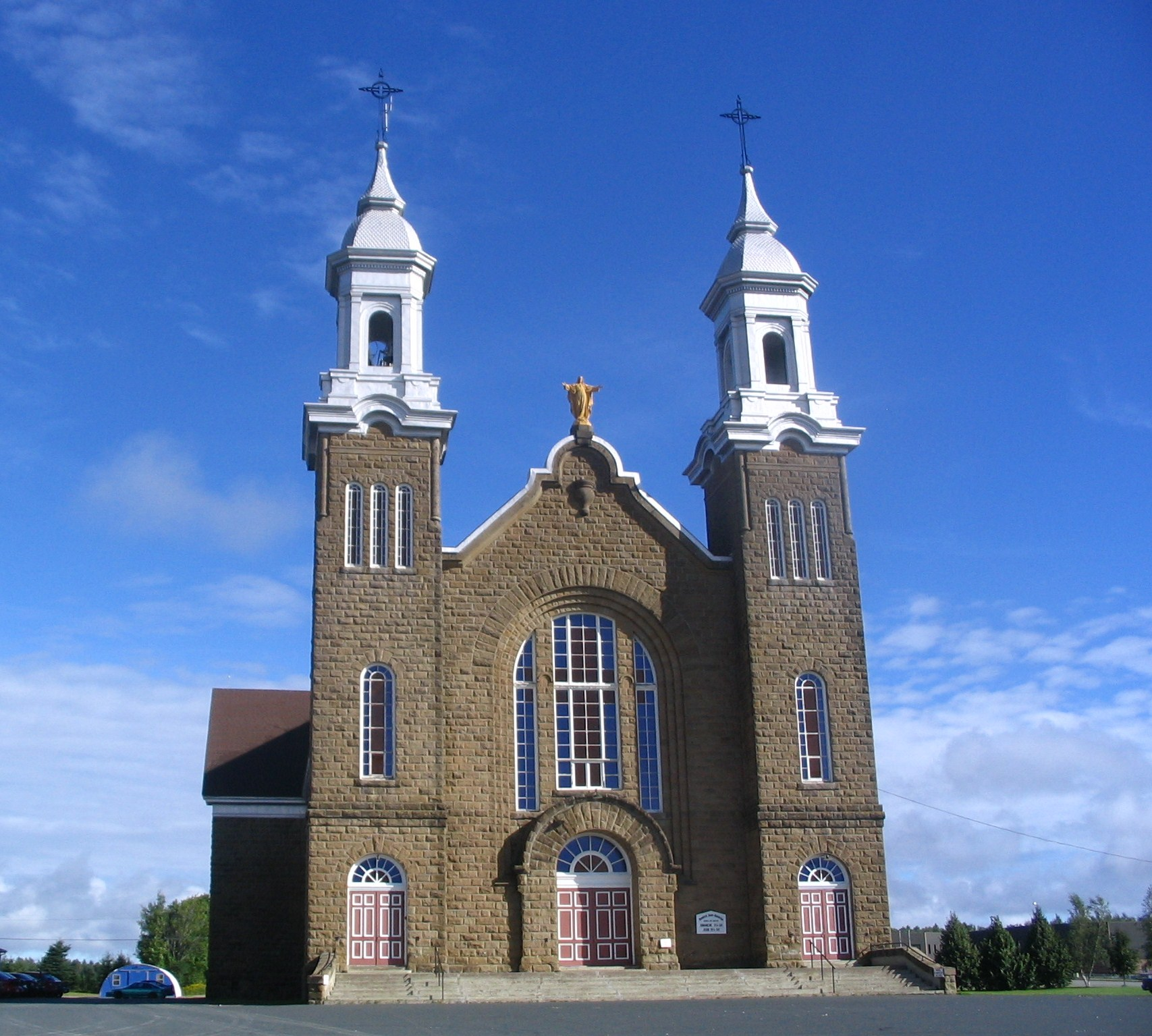
Saint-Augustin church, Paquetville.

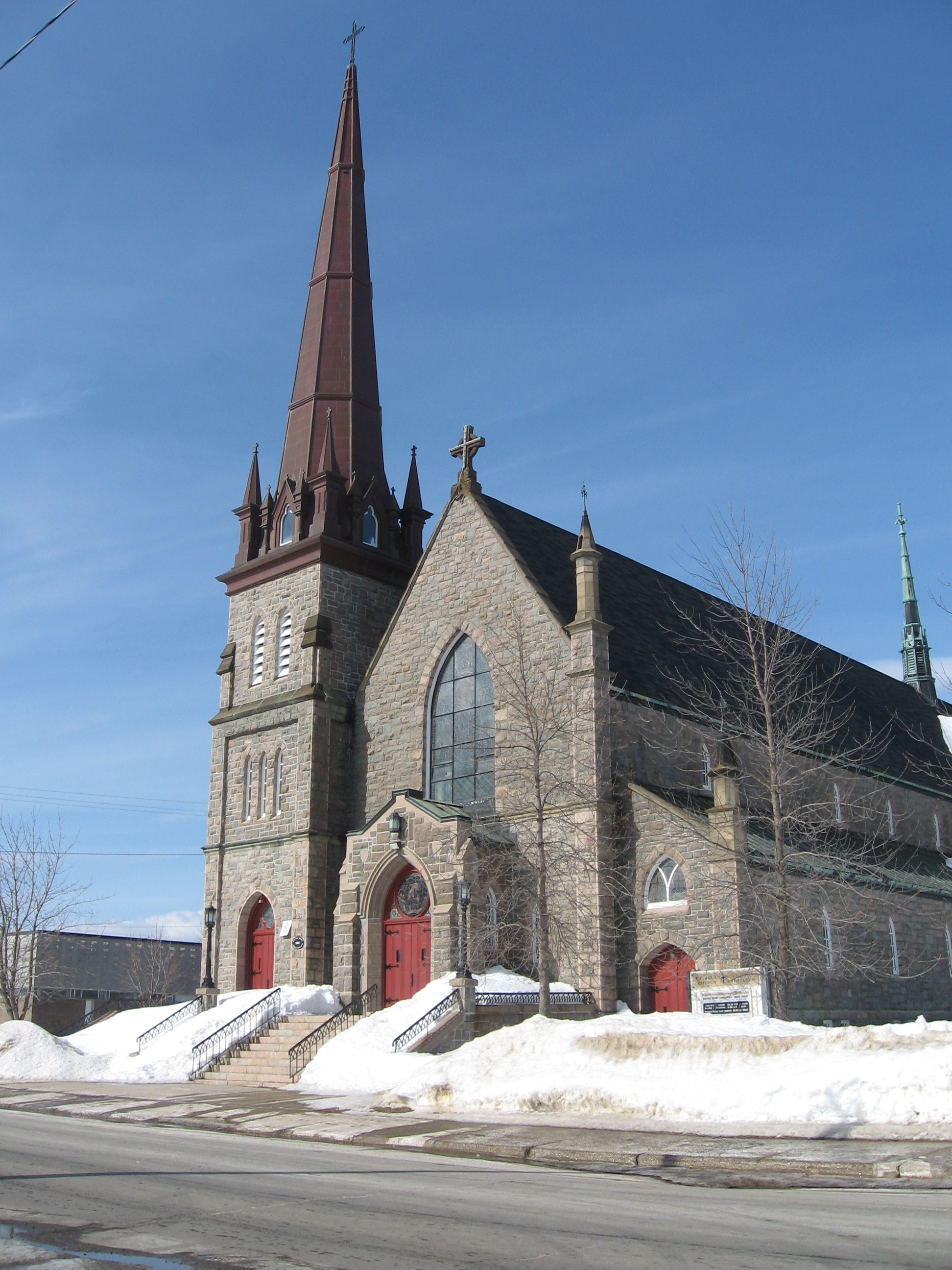
Bathurst Sacred Heart Cathedral, built in 1886.

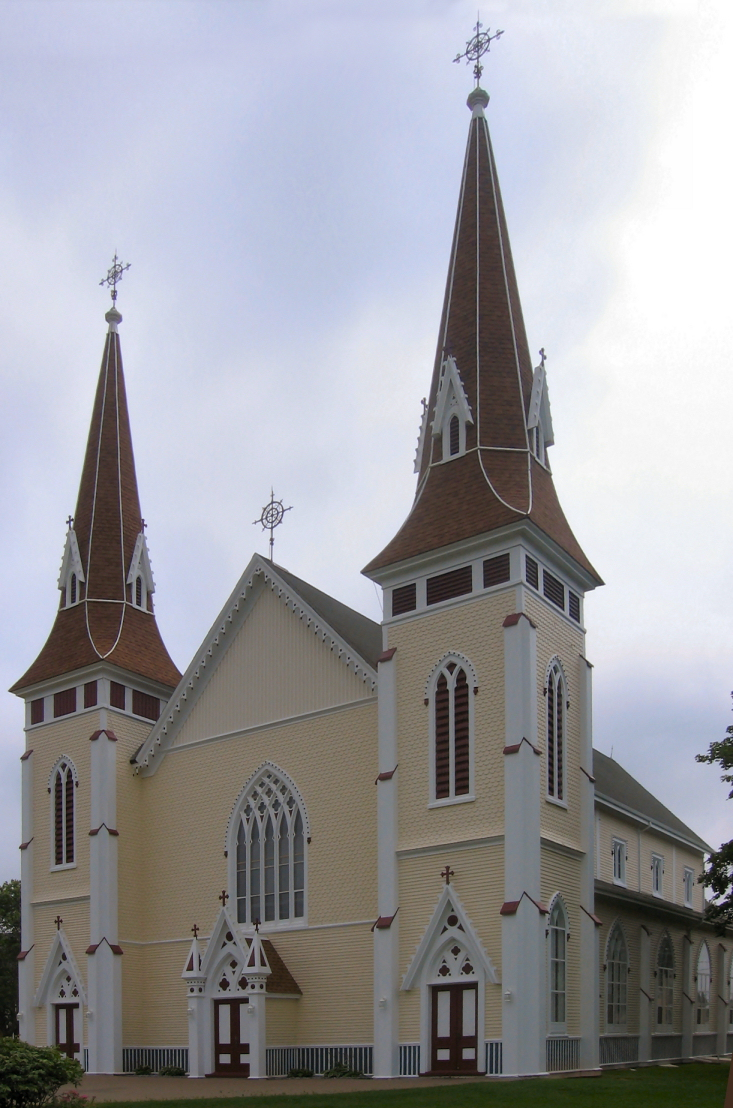
Saint-Jean-Baptiste church in Miscouche (1892).

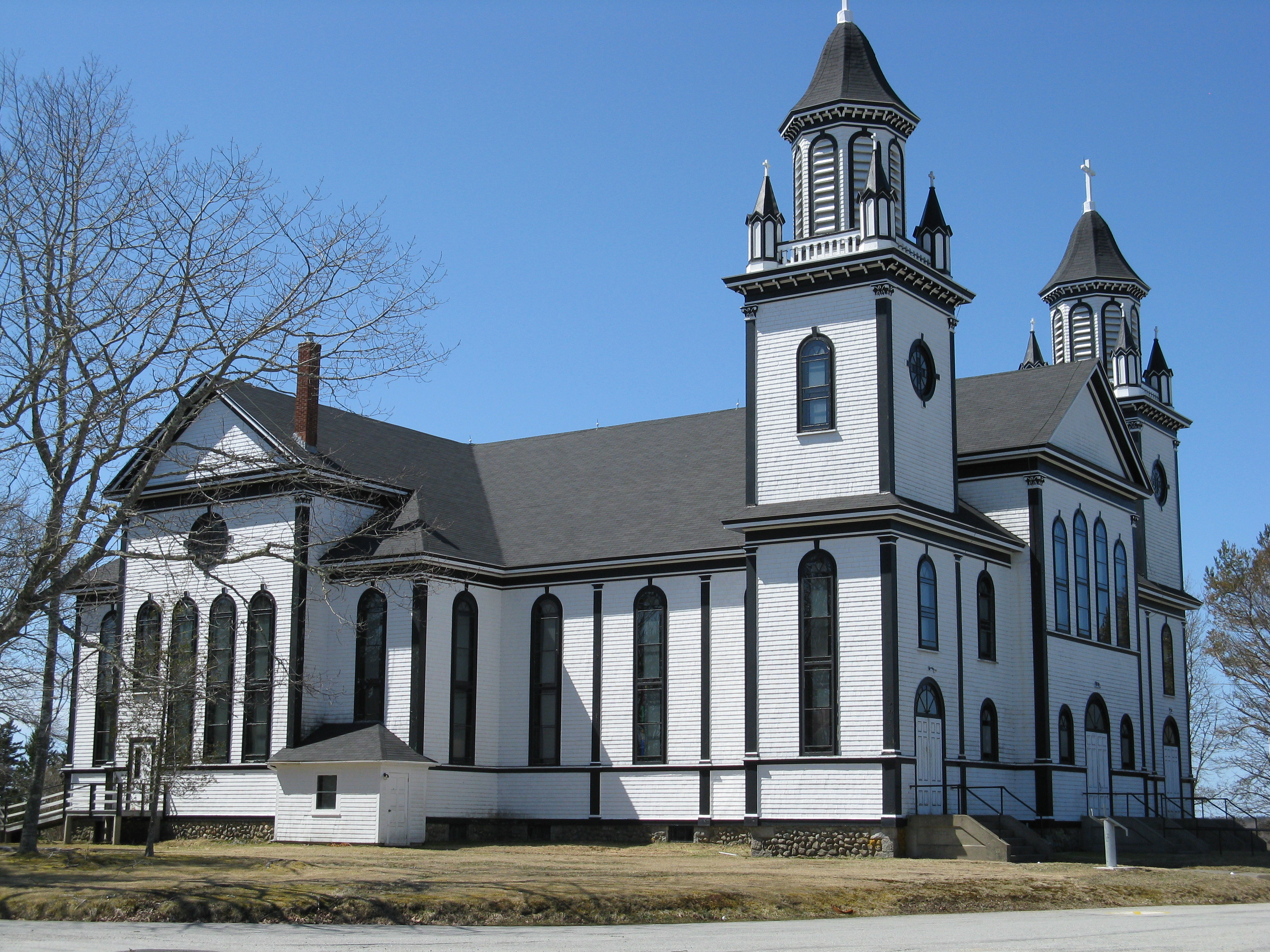
Sainte-Anne du Ruisseau church (1901).

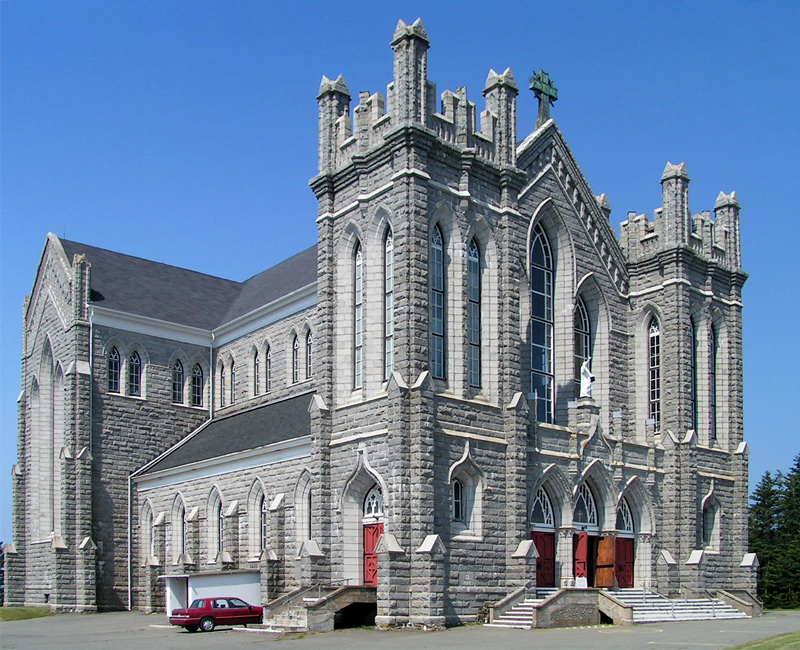
Saint-Bernard church.

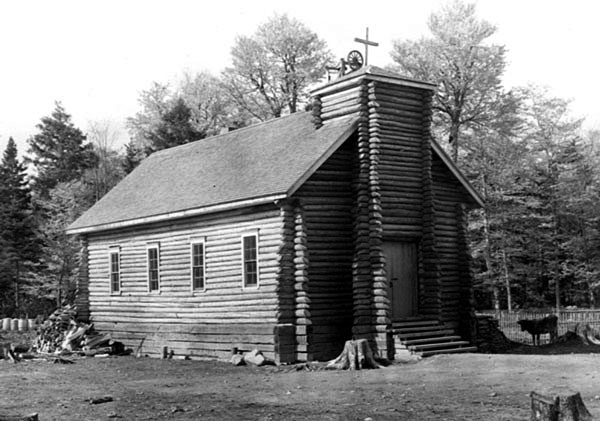
Christ-Roi d'Allardville chapel (1936).

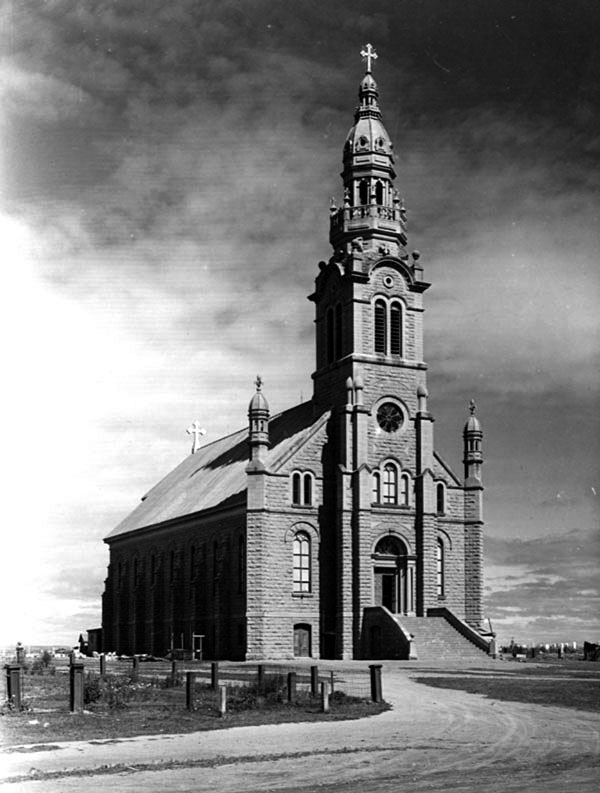
Saint-Simon and Saint-Jude church in Grande-Anse (1940).

== Industrial revolution ==
The 19th century saw the industrialization of fishing, with the Paspébiac fishing bank and Robin Company facilities in Caraquet serving as primary examples. These facilities feature numerous buildings, some in Acadian style, constructed of wood with painted white and red dado.

The opening of numerous railway lines in the latter half of the 19th century had a profound impact on the communities that were served by them. This was since city centers began to develop or appear near railway stations. Before this, Acadians were only minimally involved in commerce, except for occasional involvement in rural areas. Fidèle Poirier is credited with opening the first urban Acadian business in Shediac in 1903. The edifice is characterized by a flat roof and is constructed of bricks, a material introduced to the city in 1887 by his sister Ombéline, one of the first Acadian businesswomen.

The Intercolonial Railway, and subsequently the Canadian National, designed its stations in its Moncton offices, with the participation of some Acadian architects, including Albert Sincennes. In New Brunswick, Arts & Crafts style is evident in small stations. The Shediac station, constructed in 1906, exemplifies the typical characteristics of the stone-cut building style. Its simple volume is defined by a hipped roof with eaves that overhang on each side, supported by decorative wooden consoles.

At the time, there were few hotels in the area, with some authors suggesting that the term "hotel" was an inappropriate designation for these establishments, as they were typically houses that had been converted into inns, providing the owner with additional income. According to an 1893 tourist guide, Acadia was a challenging place to visit due to the scarcity of hotels and the often mediocre quality of those that did exist. However, the situation changed significantly in 1886 with the construction of the Intercolonial Railway and secondary lines. Apart from the larger urban centers of Bathurst and Moncton, Caraquet experienced the most significant expansion of lodging establishments until the 1920s. Following the construction of the Rive Hotel, the Seagull Hotel, and the Paulin Hotel, hotel development reached its zenith with the Château Albert, which is regarded as one of Nazaire Dugas' masterpieces. One of the most opulent establishments was the Doiron Hotel in Bas-Caraquet, which was destroyed by fire in 1961.

The architectural styles of Acadian farm buildings vary not only due to geographical location and farm size but also due to farmers' preferences and skills. The barns in Madawaska resemble those of Anglophone farmers in New England, with the main door located on the side and the interior divided into three sections. However, Acadian farmers often add distinctive stables along the entire rear side and hipped-roof cabins on the gable wall. Despite the sale of industrial agricultural tools and machines from the 19th century, this situation changed little, except in Madawaska, where the construction of the railway and the development of the potato industry led to the extension of existing barns and the construction of double barns. These consist of two parallel structures with a gable or mansard roof connected by a two-slope roof, likely inspired by Quebec.

Despite the advent of new machine-made materials, wood remains the material of choice. A report from 1886 indicates that the following woods were used by Acadians in house framing: pine, oak, spruce, ash, chestnut, and birch.

During the first half of the 20th century, shops with a boomtown-style parapet facade were particularly prevalent in rural areas.

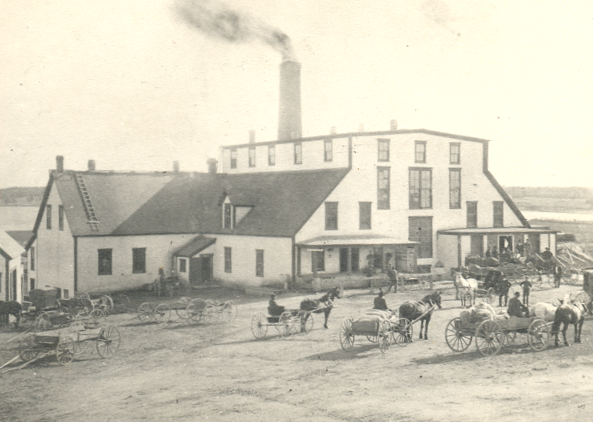
The Bouctouche butter factory in 1900.

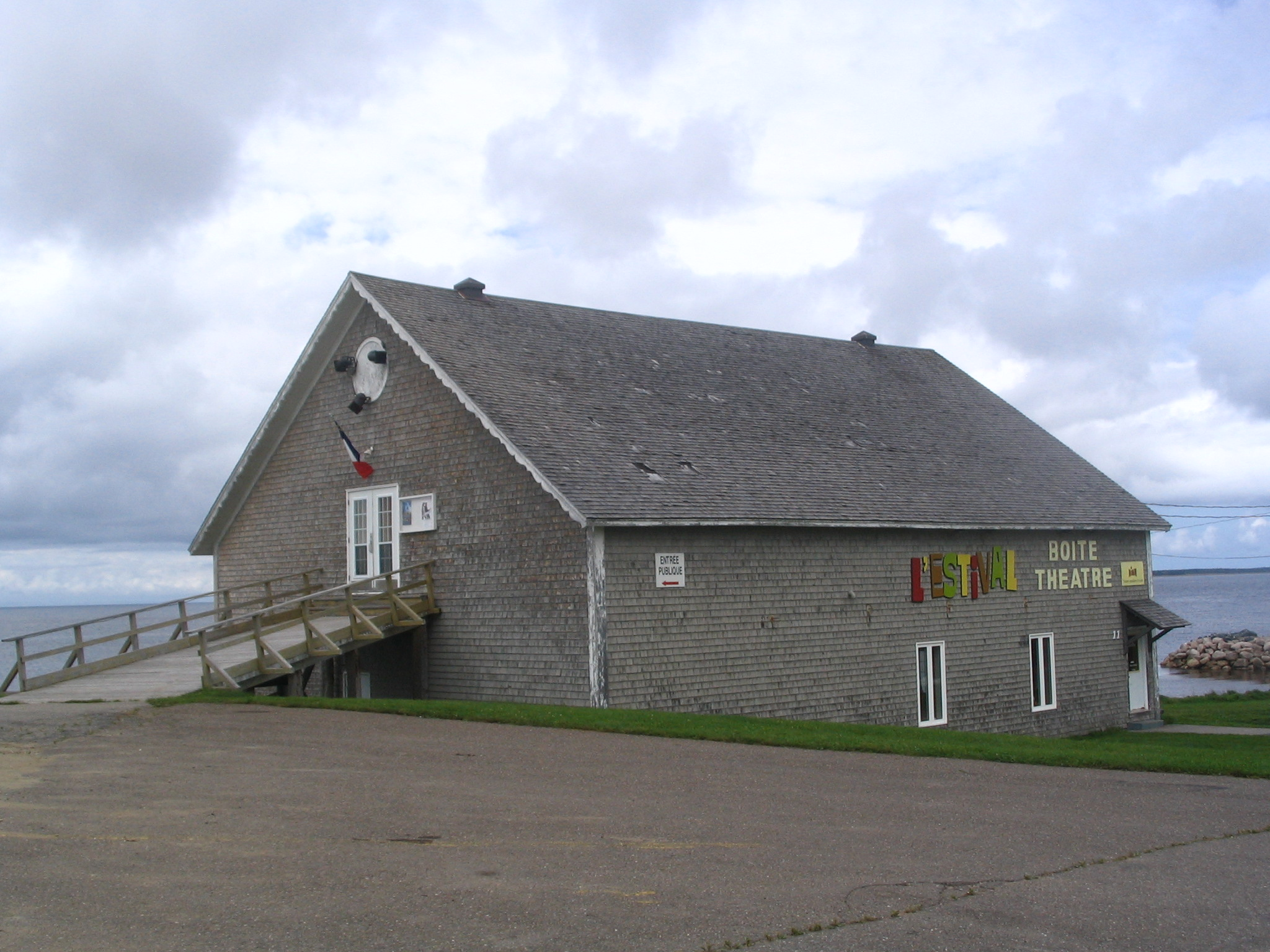
La Boîte-Théâtre, the only vestige of the Robin company in Caraquet.

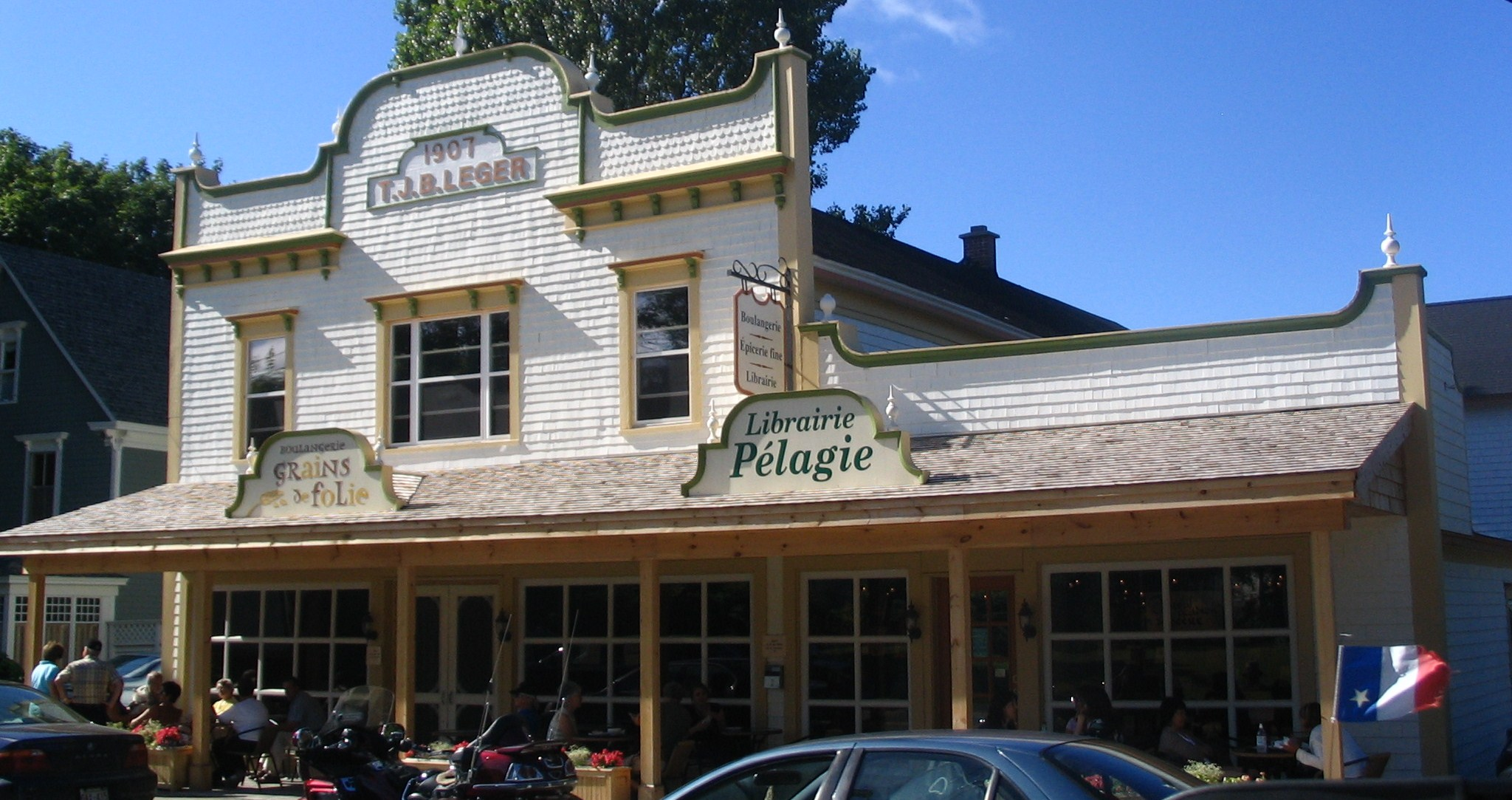
An elaborate example of a boomtown parapet in Caraquet.

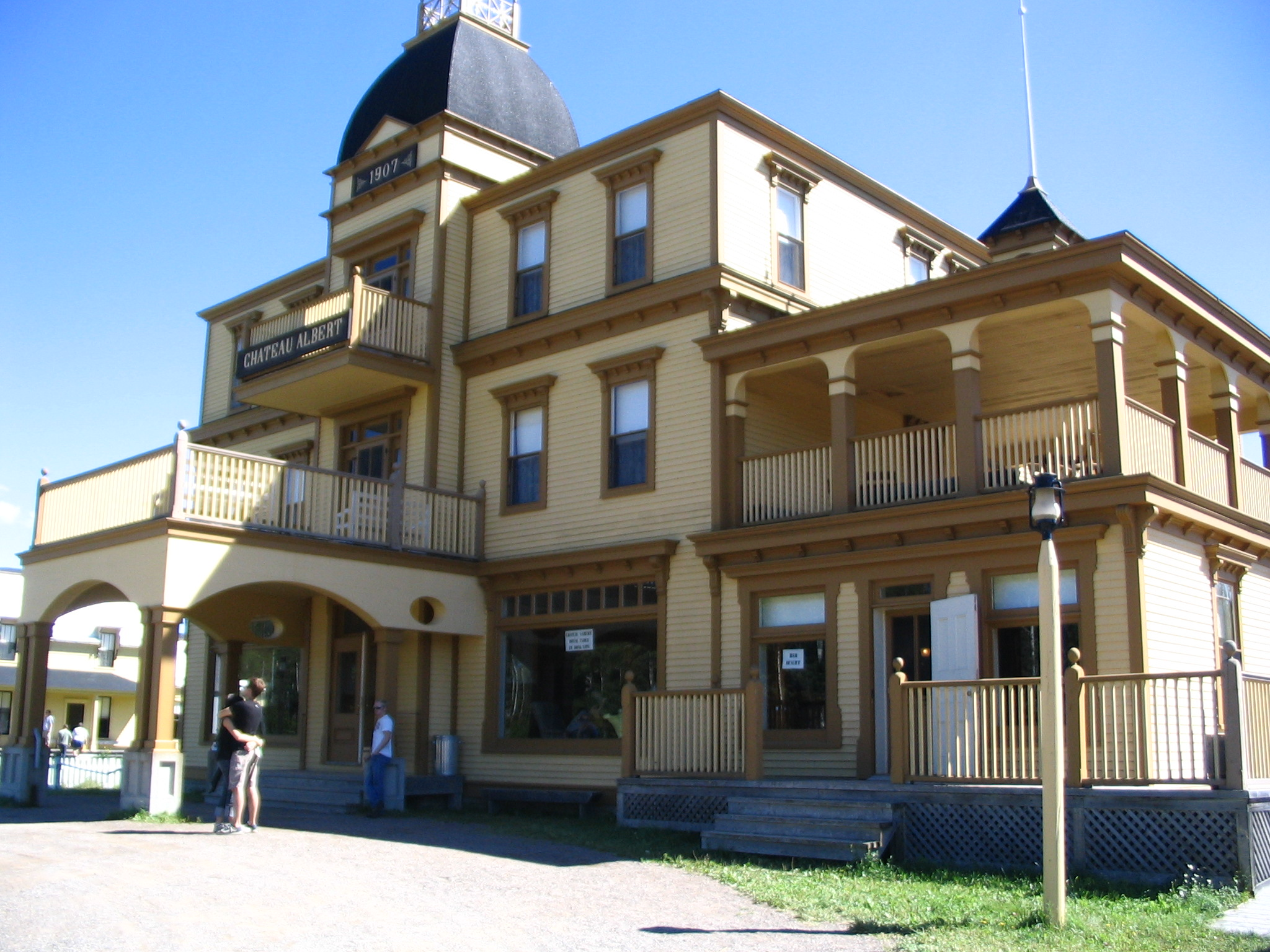
Château Albert, VHA.

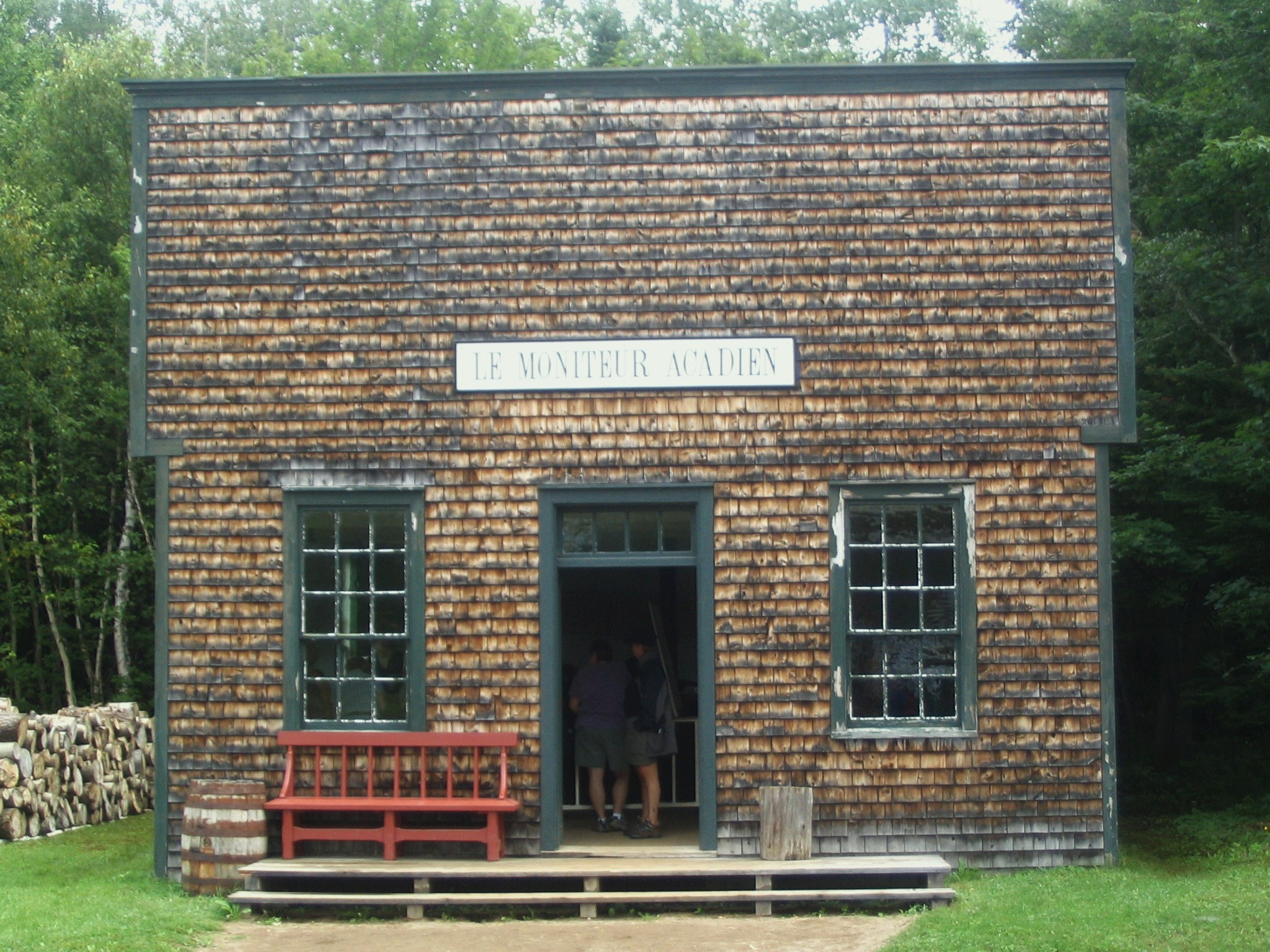
Printing of the newspaper Le Moniteur Acadien, VHA.

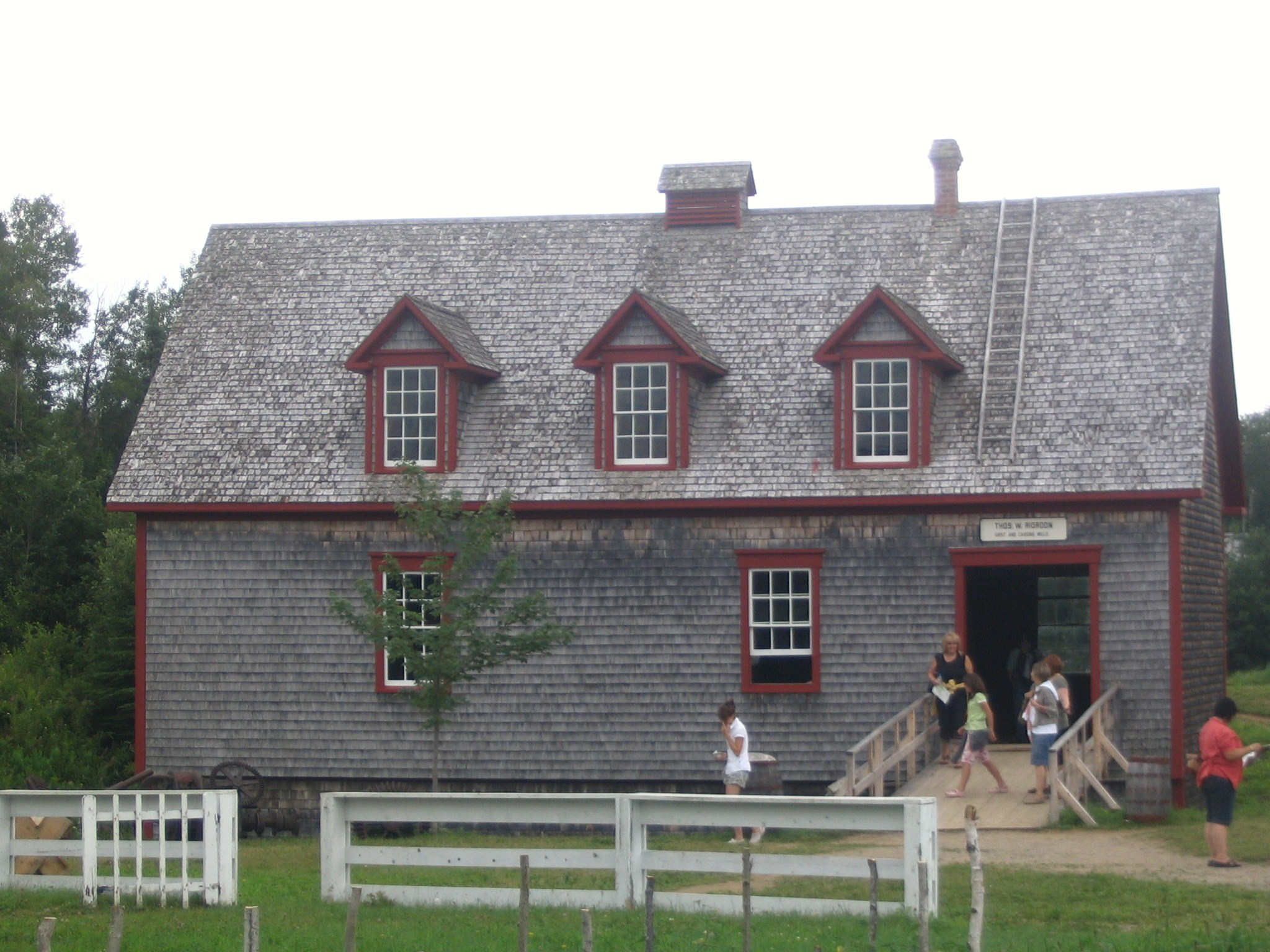
Riordon Mill, VHA.

== Modern architecture ==
In the 1960s, Acadian society underwent a profound transformation. The majority of impoverished villages witnessed the construction of larger residences, while older one- or two-room houses were either enlarged or converted into sheds. Outdoor toilets were eradicated, and the last villages also received electricity. Furthermore, the majority of chimneys were replaced by electric heating. Four-pane windows were replaced by aluminum windows, while shingles and wooden boards were covered with plastic or metal.

This era is distinguished by the prevalence of modern architecture. The Acadie Place in Caraquet, constructed in 1978 to serve as the headquarters of UNI Financial Cooperation, stands in stark contrast to its rural surroundings, featuring expansive horizontal lines, brown brick walls, and skylights. During this period, numerous cities and villages were incorporated as municipalities, resulting in the construction of new city halls, regional schools, hospitals, and other public buildings.

The construction of skyscrapers in Moncton during the 1960s is noteworthy. Despite the city's Acadian population comprising only a third of the population, three of the four tallest inhabited buildings housed Acadian institutions. The University of Moncton opened in 1963, including Lafrance Residence, which stands at 11 stories. Another notable example is Assumption Place, constructed in 1972, which is the tallest building in the city at 81 meters and 20 stories. This is complemented by the Our Lady of the Assumption Cathedral, the city's fourth tallest building at 75 meters, erected in 1955.

In the wake of the Second Vatican Council, numerous churches underwent significant alterations, with some experiencing irreversible damage. A notable exception is the Sainte-Anne-de-Kent Church, designed in the Neo-Gothic style by Léon Léger in 1886. The church was nicknamed the "Sistine Chapel of New Brunswick" due to its numerous artworks, including 48 iconographic frescoes by Édouard Gautreau, a Murano chandelier, and sculptures by Léon Léger. Its destruction in a 2005 fire was considered one of the major losses of artwork in New Brunswick's Acadian history. The church was rebuilt in 2007 in a more modern style, incorporating surviving artworks, a new altar, and old paintings and benches from other churches. Other places of worship, such as Saint-Pierre-aux-Liens Church in Caraquet, saw artworks reinstalled later. Despite this, church construction continues, characterized by their modern style, with main examples in Saint-Léonard, Lakeburn, and Saint-Louis-de-Kent.

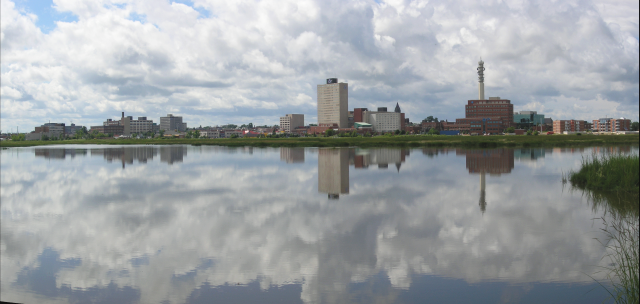
Panorama of Moncton, with Assomption Square in the center.

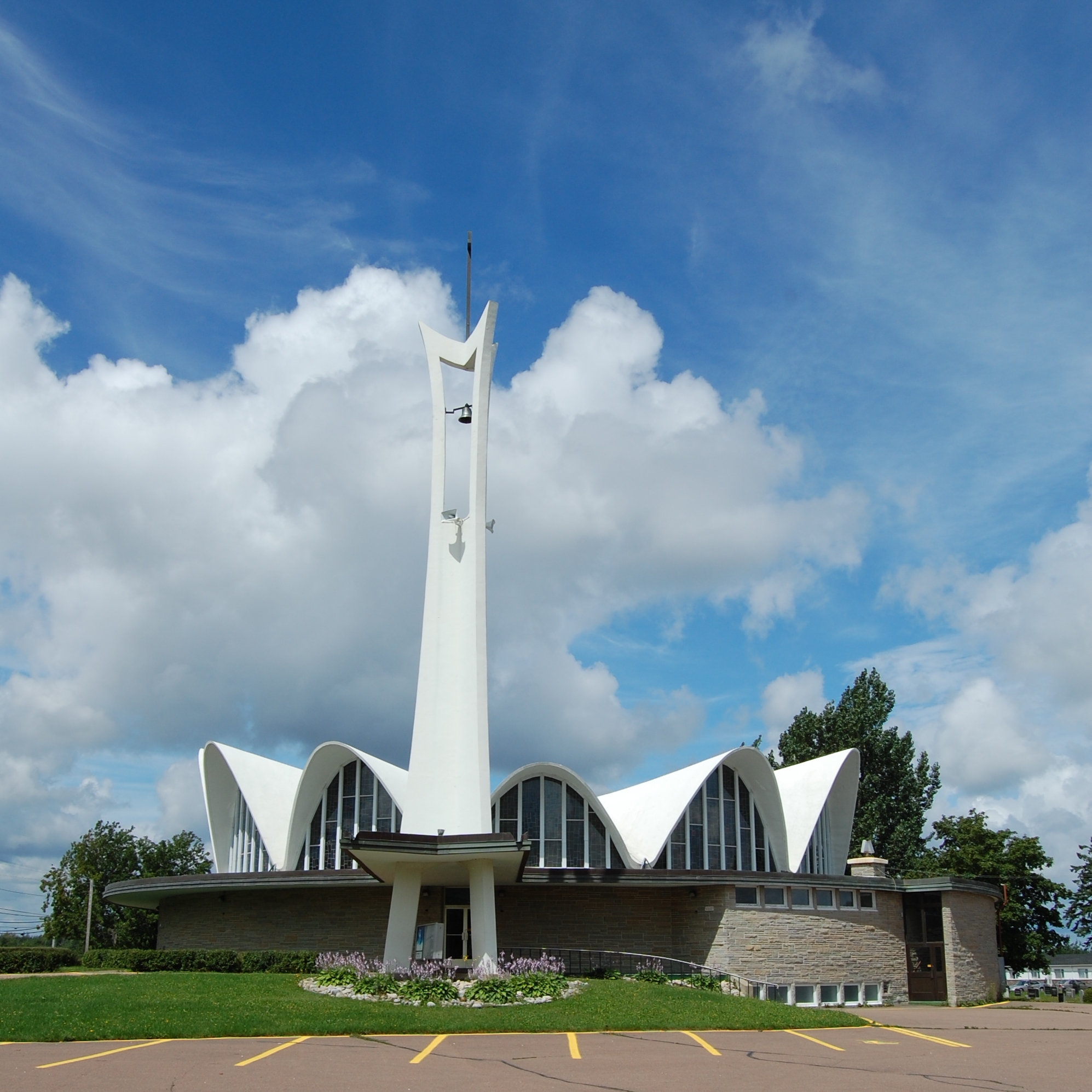
Saint-Louis-de-Gonzague Church in Richibouctou.

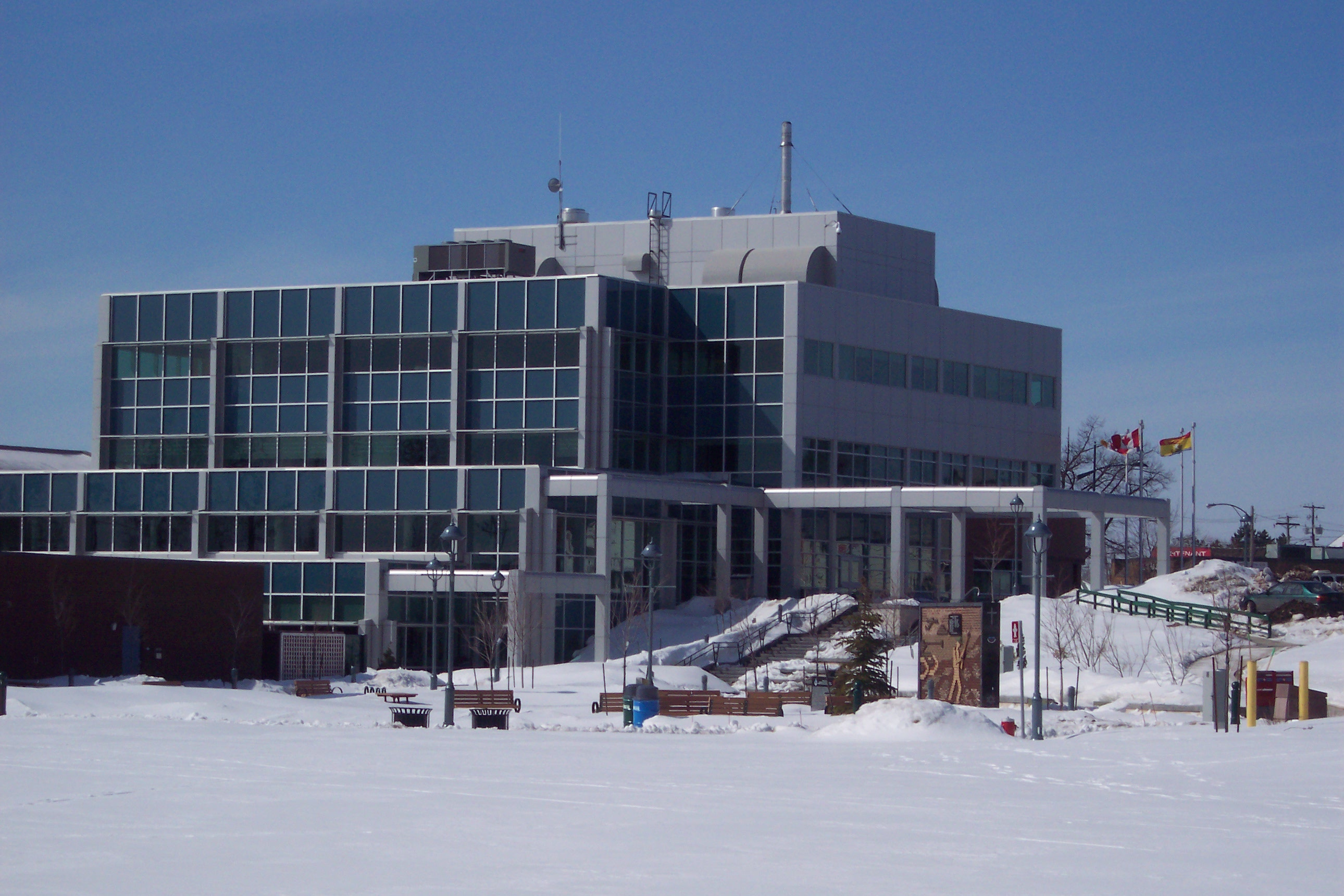
Dieppe town hall.

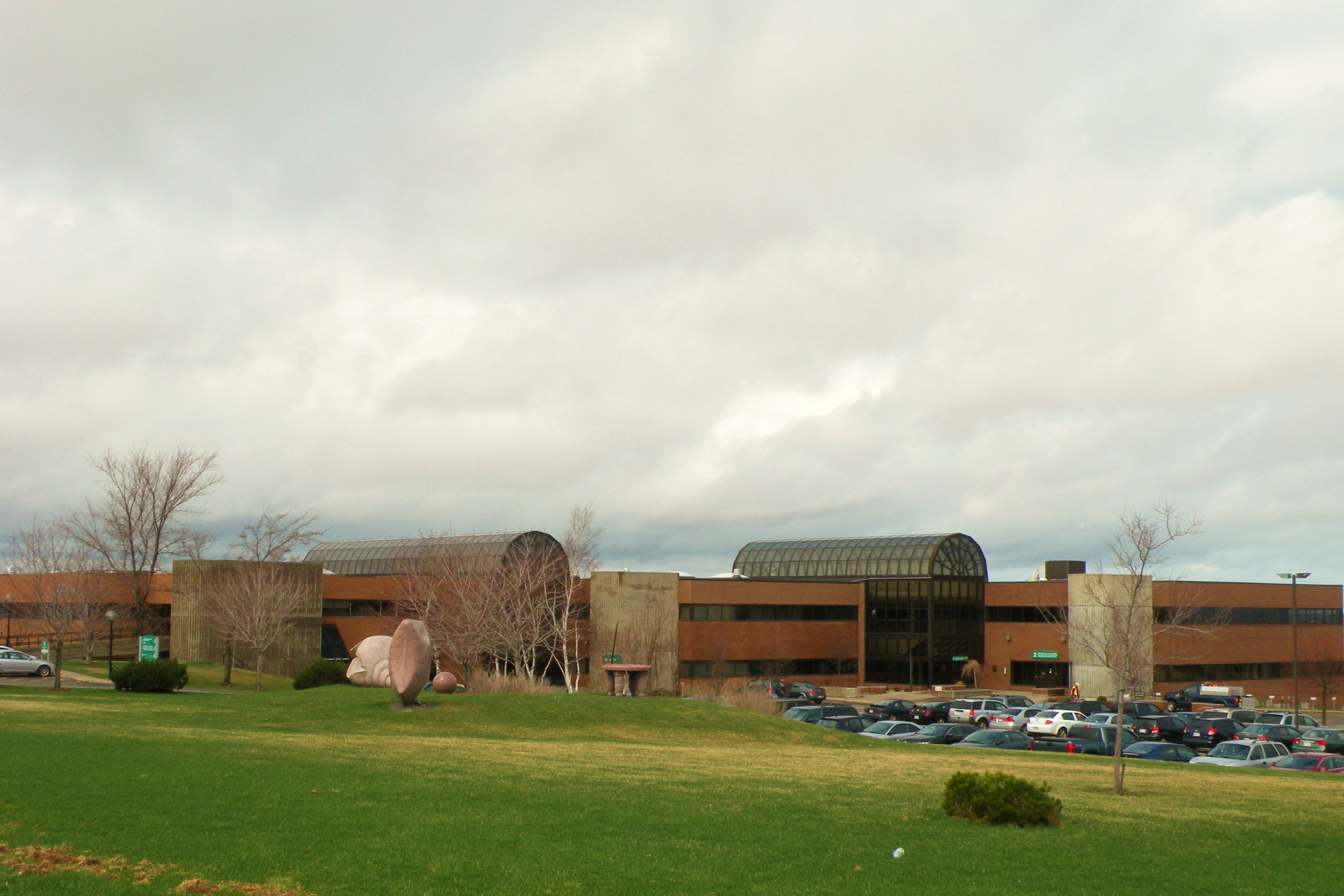
Place de l'Acadie, Caraquet.

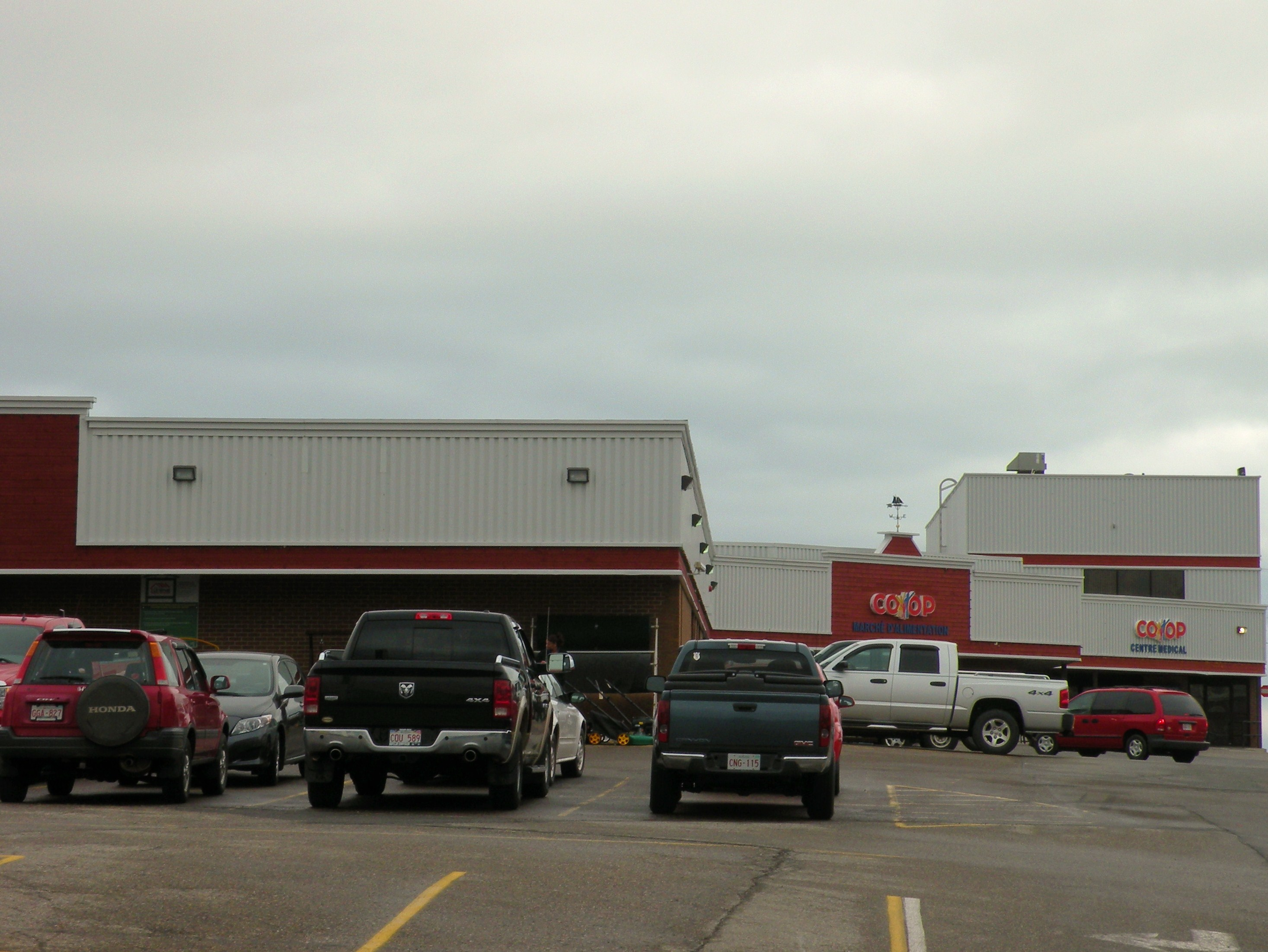
Commerce in Caraquet.

== Back to origins ==
=== Architecture study ===
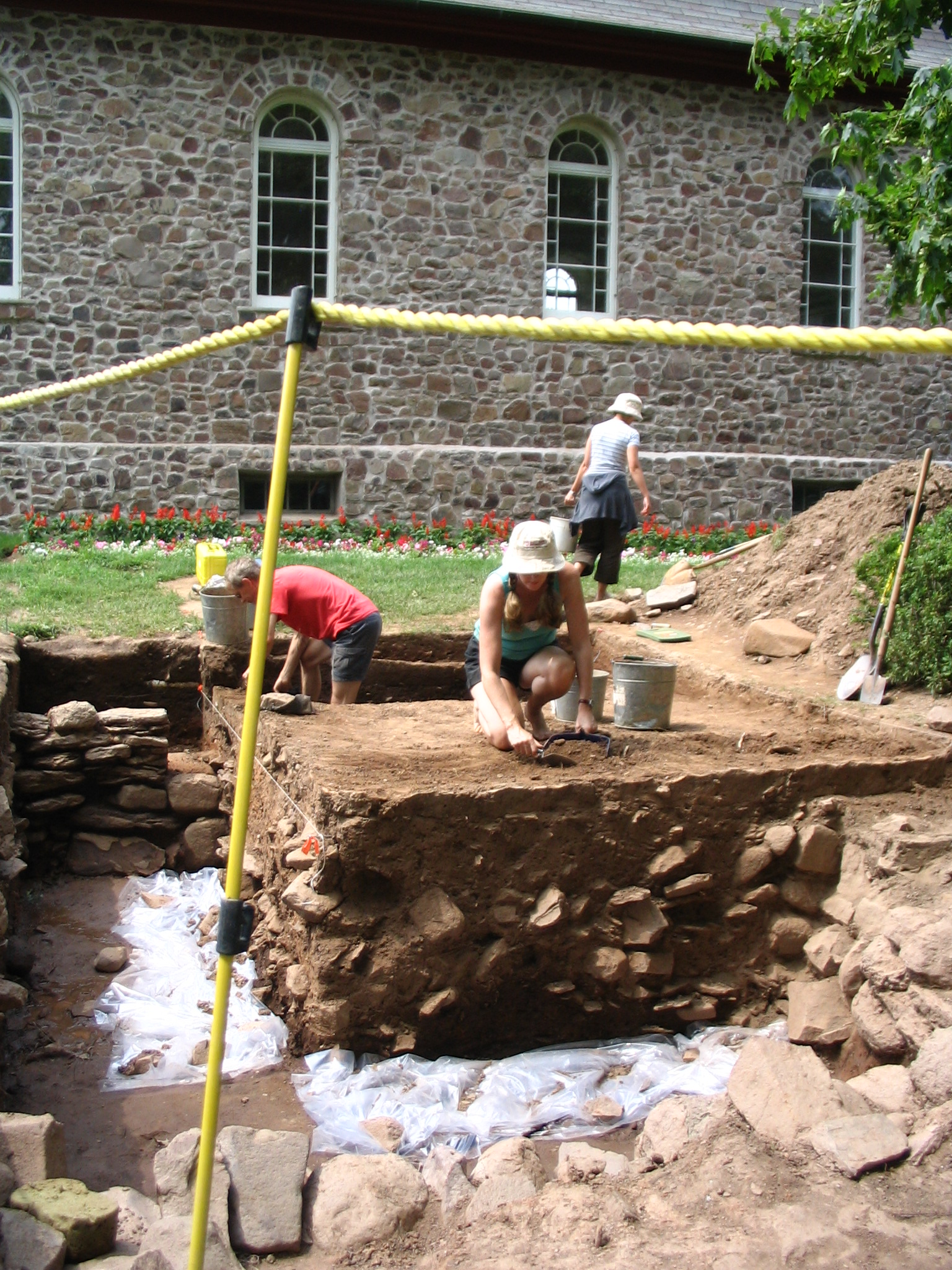
Archaeological excavations at Grand-Pré.

The Acadian material culture, including its architecture, is an important source for understanding Acadian history. The study of architecture predating the deportation primarily relies on period documents due to the absence of intact houses. (Note: Some houses in Annapolis Royal are believed to date from before 1755. The Louis Cannes house is thought to have been constructed around 1708–1710, while the oldest part of the former Farmer's Hotel is believed to be the Jean-Baptiste Soulard house, built around 1710. According to tradition, the oldest part of the Jeremiah Calkin house in Grand-Pré would be an old Acadian house.) These documents often contain vague and incomplete descriptions, along with a few small-scale drawings. Moreover, the authors of that era were primarily interested in politics rather than the daily life and culture of the Acadians. However, archaeological excavations since the 1960s have provided new insights into the subject. The two main sites are Melanson Settlement and Bellisle Settlement, both in Nova Scotia. Excavations are currently underway at the Grand-Pré National Historic Site, to uncover the ruins of Saint-Charles-des-Mines Church to gain a deeper understanding of both the deportation and the architecture of that period.

In 1969, Anselme Chiasson published the inaugural article, Les vieilles maisons acadiennes (The Old Acadian Houses). This was followed by a surge of interest in the Acadian Historical Village project and an increase in research on Quebecois architecture, which prompted Acadians to recognize the historical value of their architectural heritage. The initial significant study, Social and Architectural Aspects of Acadians in New Brunswick, was conducted in 1971 by J. Rodolphe Bourque for the New Brunswick Historic Resources Administration (ARH). This research continued with the development of the Acadian Historical Village by architects Ross Anderson (employed by Parks Canada) and Jacques Boucher (with his firm in Bathurst), Jean Pelletier from the Madawaska Historical Museum, and a team of historians. The research group À la découverte de l'habitation acadienne (Discovering Acadian Dwellings), from the Centre d'études acadiennes (CEA), commenced its investigation in 1976 and subsequently published two volumes. In 1979, Jean-Claude Dupont published an analysis titled Habitation rurale (Rural Dwellings) in Histoire populaire de l'Acadie (Popular History of Acadia), which described the relationship between architecture and its environment, as well as the folklore associated with it. Clarence LeBreton was the first to conduct field studies at the Acadian Historical Village.

The field of Acadian architecture remains underdeveloped, with a primary focus on domestic architecture. In 1976, the Canadian Encyclopedia Association (CEA) announced a comprehensive study on the subject, but the project was ultimately canceled in 1978 due to a lack of funding.

In the United States, the French Heritage Society has been a significant contributor to the preservation of French architectural heritage since 1982, including that of the Cajuns.

=== Historical villages ===
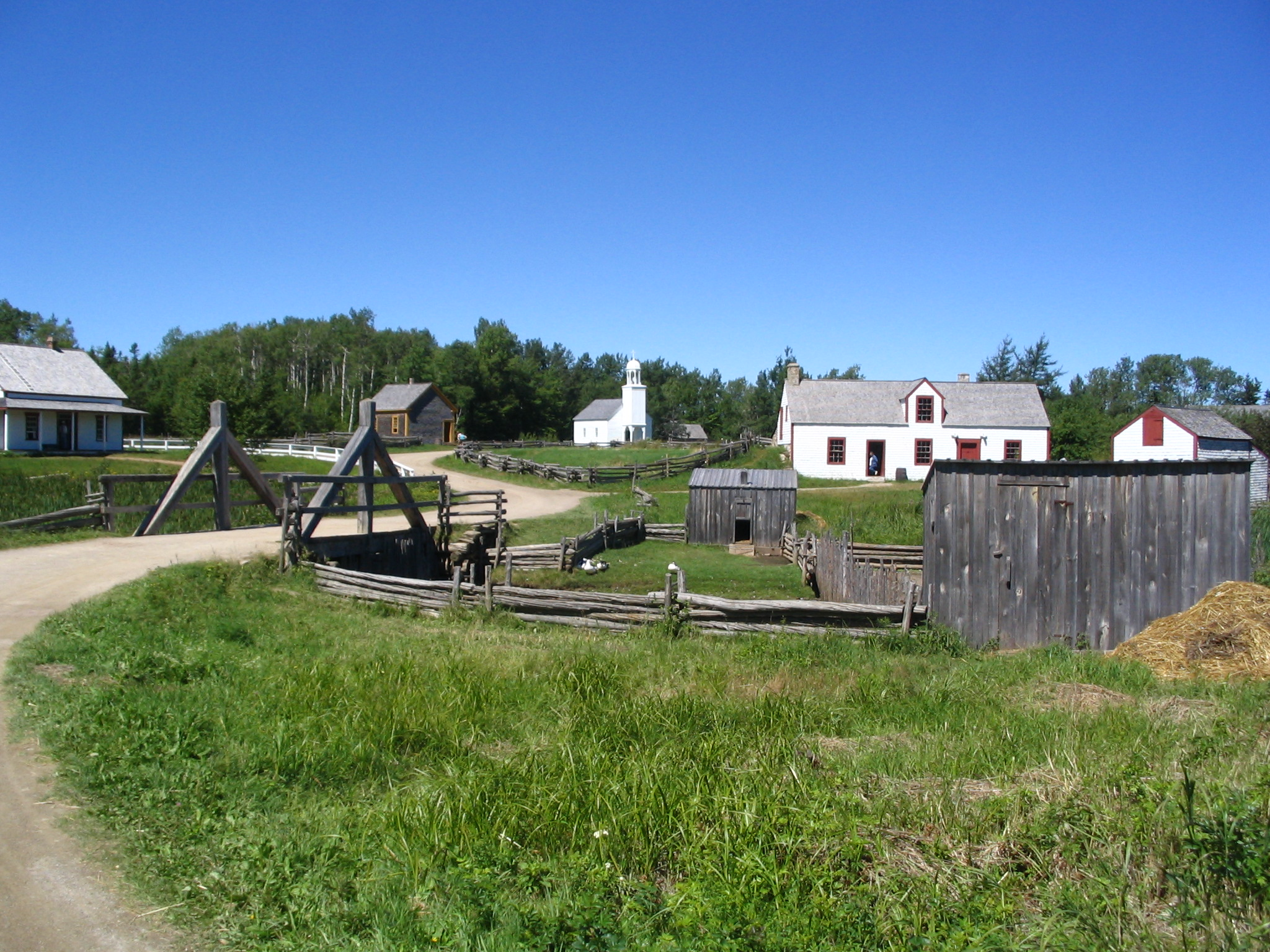
View of the historic Acadian village.

The Acadian Historical Village of Rivière-du-Nord in New Brunswick opened its doors in 1976. Since then, it has undergone continual expansion, recreating daily life in Acadia from 1770 to 1939 through 38 historic buildings and 9 replicas. The Acadian Village of Van Buren, Maine, also opened in 1976, featuring a train station, church, forge, school, and general store. In Louisiana, there are Vermilionville and the Acadian Village near Lafayette, as well as the Acadian Historical Village in St. Martinville. The Village de l'Acadie, located in Mont-Carmel, Prince Edward Island, is a recreational-touristic complex installed in a reproduction of an Acadian village. The Acadian Historical Village of Pobomcoup, Nova Scotia, opened its doors in 1999, recreating society from 1653 to the present. It includes several houses, a forge, and a fish processing plant. Plans are underway to reconstruct Philippe Mius d'Entremont's seigniorial castle.

The proposed historical village project at Grand-Pré did not materialize.

=== Challenging modern architecture ===
In recent years, there has been a growing trend towards revaluing traditional architecture. One of the pioneering municipalities in this regard is the town of Caraquet. The municipality has established a heritage preservation committee, created a list of protected heritage buildings, and published a preservation guide. As a result of these initiatives, dozens of houses and businesses have been restored, and new buildings are constructed in the traditional style, particularly all recent buildings in the Caraquet port. Several other municipalities have also adopted similar policies, including Cap-aux-Meules, where the new cinema draws inspiration from local architectural styles.

The recent revitalization of railway heritage in Acadian regions is a relatively recent phenomenon. The Saint-Quentin station, which was destroyed in 1987, was rebuilt in 2004 and now serves as a tourist information center. A new station is currently under construction in Petit-Rocher in 2008, based on the designs of the former station master's residence from the 1940s. The Acadian Historical Village of New Brunswick will soon include a replica of a railway station.

Since the 1970s, there has been a resurgence of interest in Cajun culture, including its architectural heritage. This has manifested in the construction of numerous new houses in the traditional Cajun style since the 1990s.

The Eco-Center of the Bouctouche Dune was constructed between 1996 and 1997 by the architectural plans of Élide Albert. A 1.8 km wooden piloti traverses various dune ecosystems. At the entrance, a visitor center is situated, comprising an observation tower and a small single-room building with an ecological sewage system. The architectural style of the building is inspired by Acadian architecture, yet it bears resemblance to similar structures in New England, particularly in terms of its pyramidal roofs.

In addition, the Pays de la Sagouine was constructed between 1991 and 1999 in Bouctouche, following the designs of Élide Albert and Dianne Van Dommelen. This park recreates a fictional Acadian village, as depicted in Antonine Maillet's literary work La Sagouine. The village is constructed on stilts to prevent damage to the surrounding marshes, while the buildings and roads are built on the foundations of former structures. The buildings' simple forms, wooden framework, exterior walls paneled with boards or shingles, and mullioned windows are inspired by rural architecture in New Brunswick.

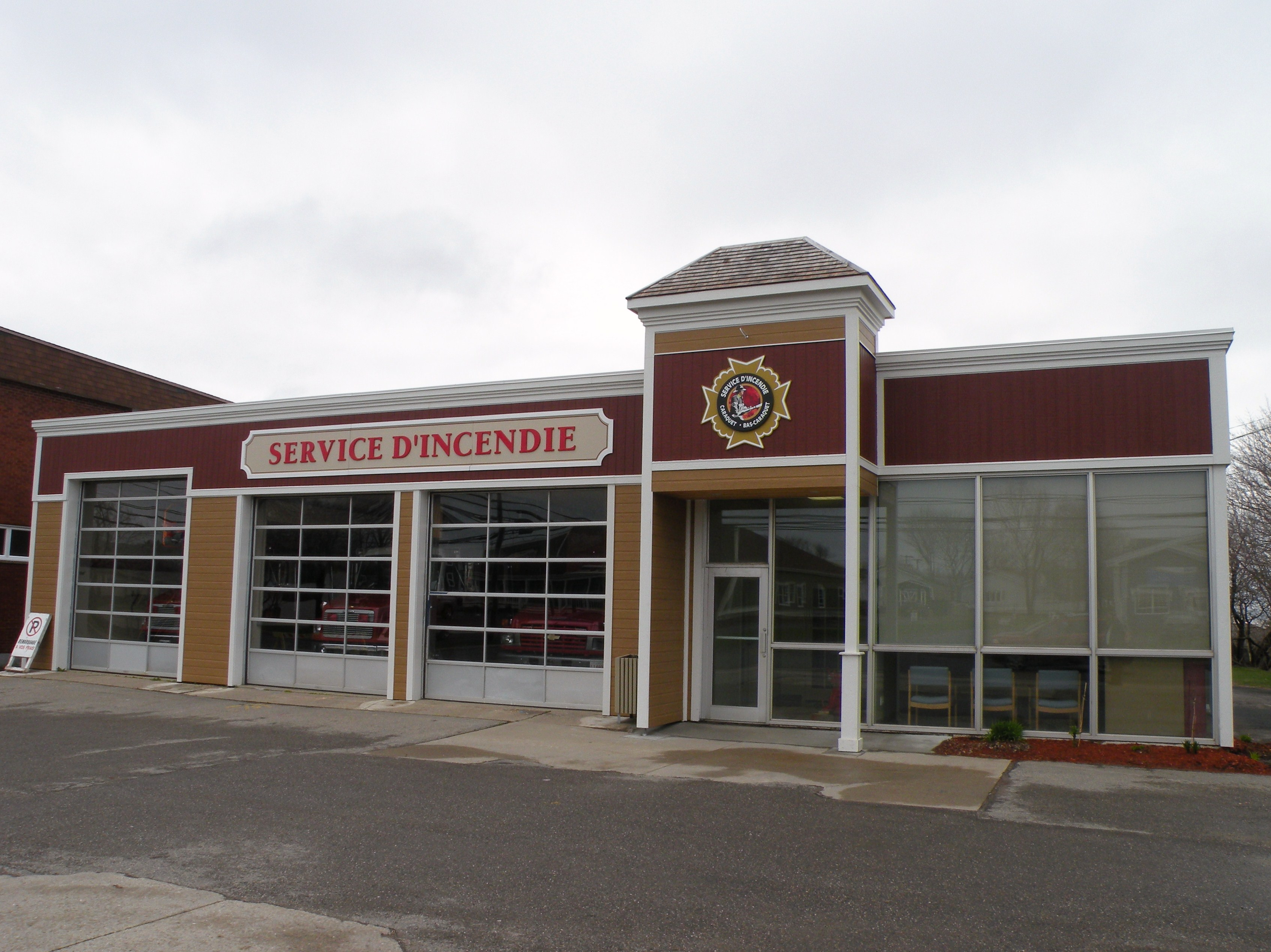
Caraquet fire station.

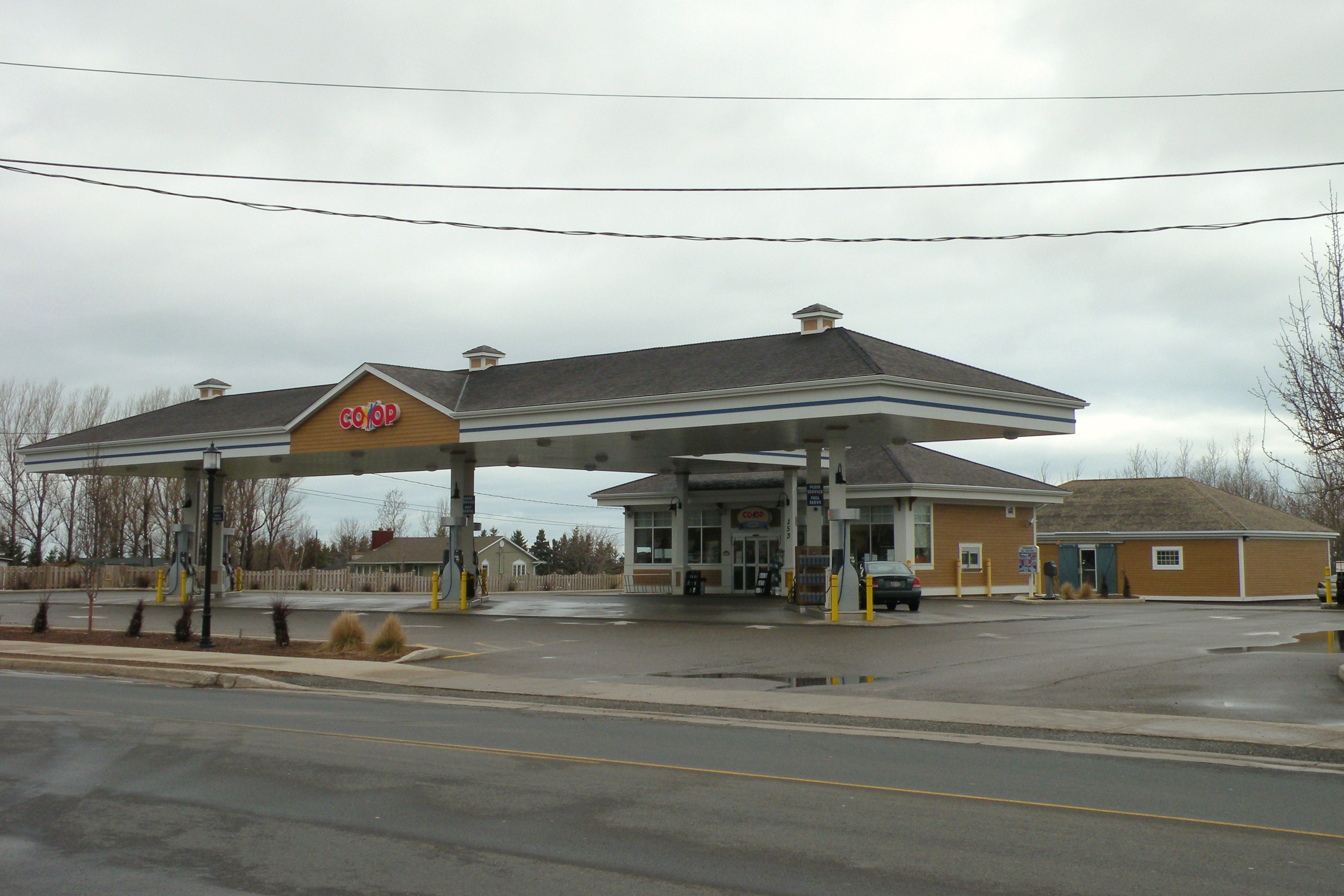
Caraquet cooperative service station.

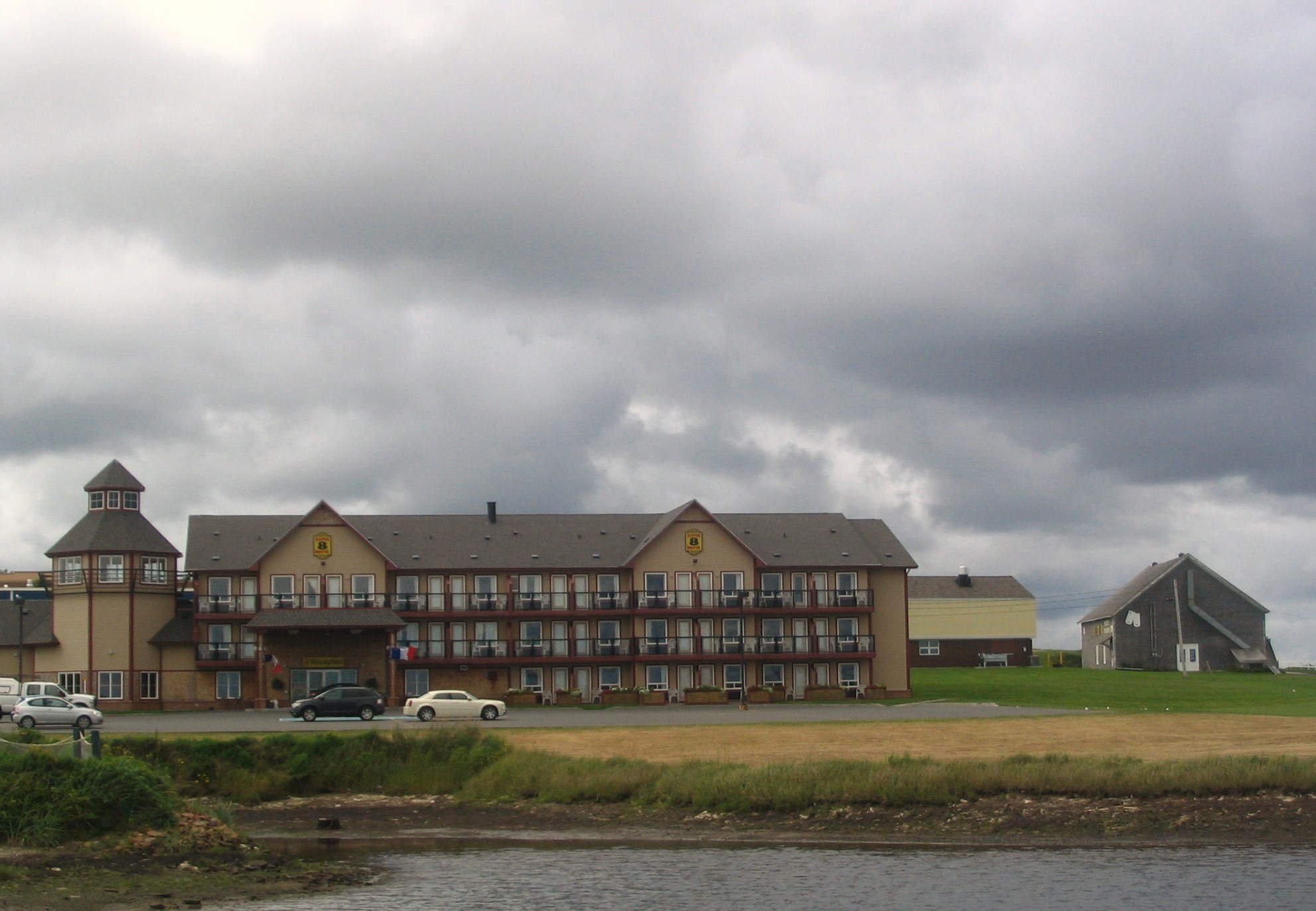
The Super 8 hotel in Caraquet.

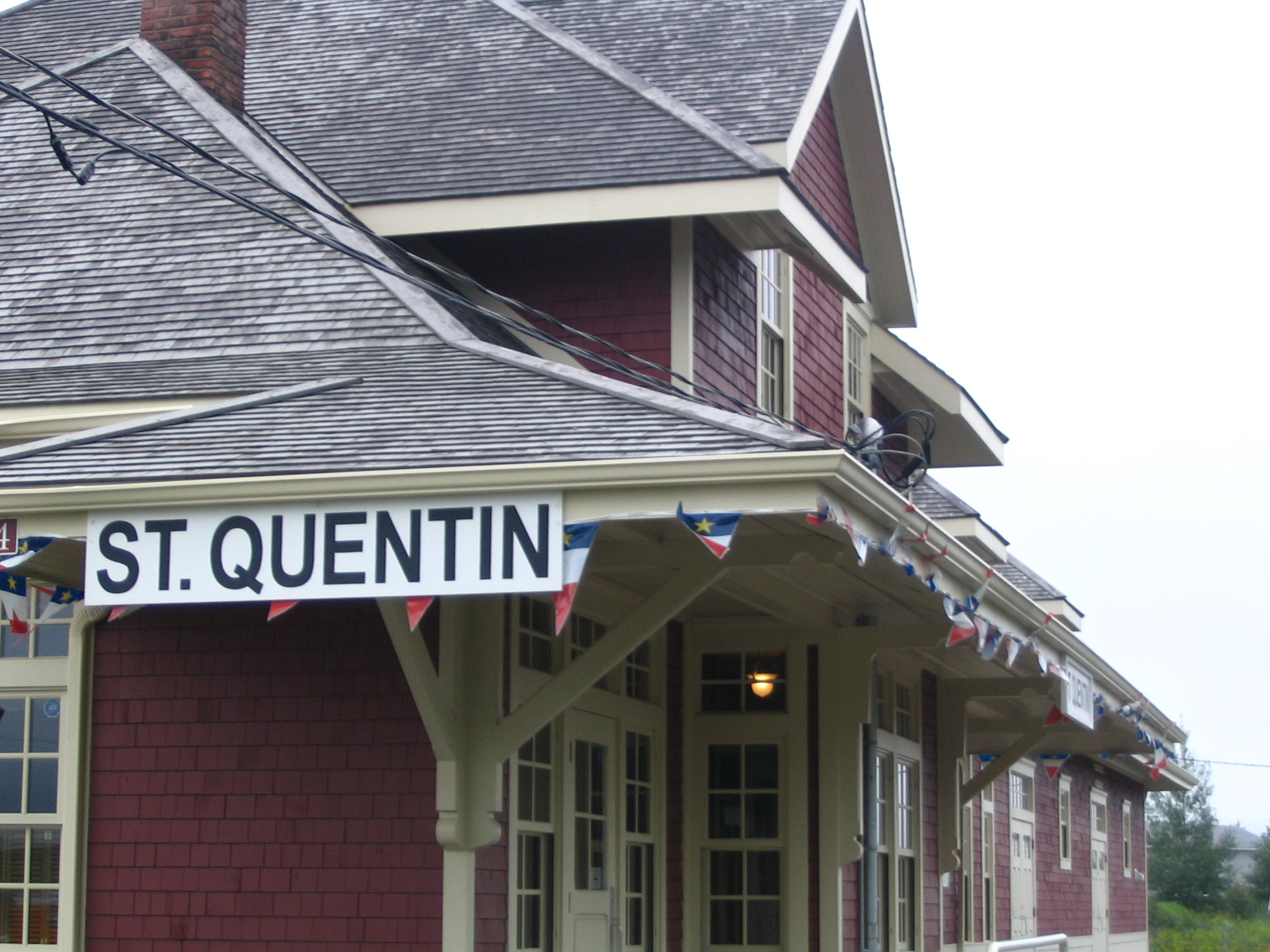
Saint-Quentin station.

== Distinct buildings ==
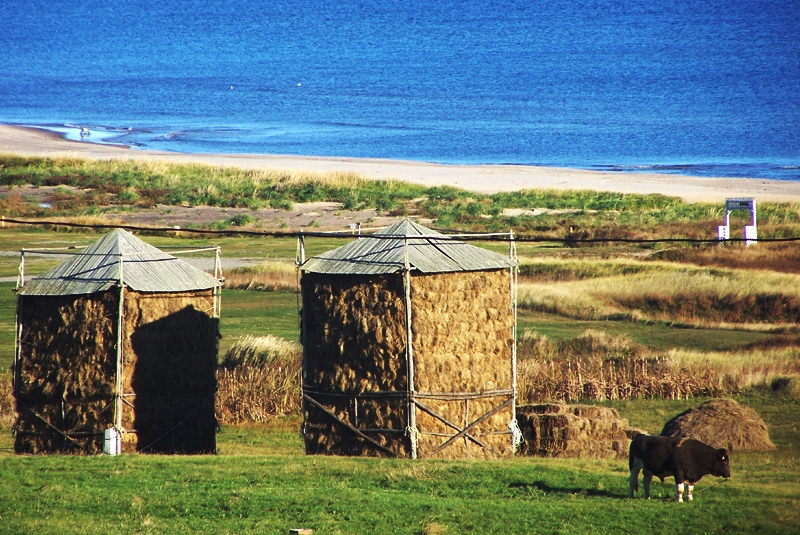
Hay huts in Bassin.

Some architectural structures are distinctive to the Acadian region.

The camp à façade abritée (sheltered facade camp), also known as casque à palette and comparable to a Swiss chalet, was once a common architectural feature. The facade of this type of building opens into a gabled wall. The veranda results from the extension of the farms on the gables. This architectural style was employed for a variety of purposes, including the storage of Indian corn in Louisiana, the construction of animal shelters in Saint-Théophile, and the establishment of lumberjack camps in New Brunswick and in Matapedia and Bonaventure.

The baraque à foin (hay barrack) is a square structure measuring 4 to 4.5 meters wide, designed to store hay. It is constructed with four posts 5 meters high, supporting a pyramidal roof. At the end of each post is a pulley operated by cables, allowing the roof to be raised according to the amount of hay to be preserved. The walls can be paneled to prevent animals from eating the hay. The structures were discovered in Chéticamp, the Magdalen Islands, Prince Edward Island, until the early 20th century. However, they have since been found only in the Magdalen Islands and among the Anglophones of Newfoundland. The origin of the hay barrack is uncertain, and there is a possibility that they originated in Pennsylvania, but they were larger and probably had a fixed roof. Additionally, they have been identified in Romania.

Some green roof hangars still exist in Newfoundland. These are low-rise buildings constructed with long wood framing, where the posts are spaced approximately forty centimeters apart. The roof is supported by closely spaced rafters, resting securely on bents. The roofing is covered with sods of grass, clumps of earth covered with grass.

Continuous dwellings are most prevalent in the Chaleur Region, as well as in the Caps and Baie-Sainte-Marie. This architectural style involves the integration of the house with all its outbuildings, including sheds, barns, and other structures, regardless of their architectural style.

The smokehouse is a small building constructed from cedar or spruce boards used for preparing boucané herring. Its use is complex, as the fire must produce a substantial quantity of smoke with minimal flame damage to the structure. Around the 1910s, modern commercial smokehouses emerged in the Cap-Pelé region, based on techniques learned from the smoke-curing practitioners of Grand Manan. However, some artisanal installations still exist, especially in Anse-Bleue.

== Influence of the environment ==
=== Sea ===
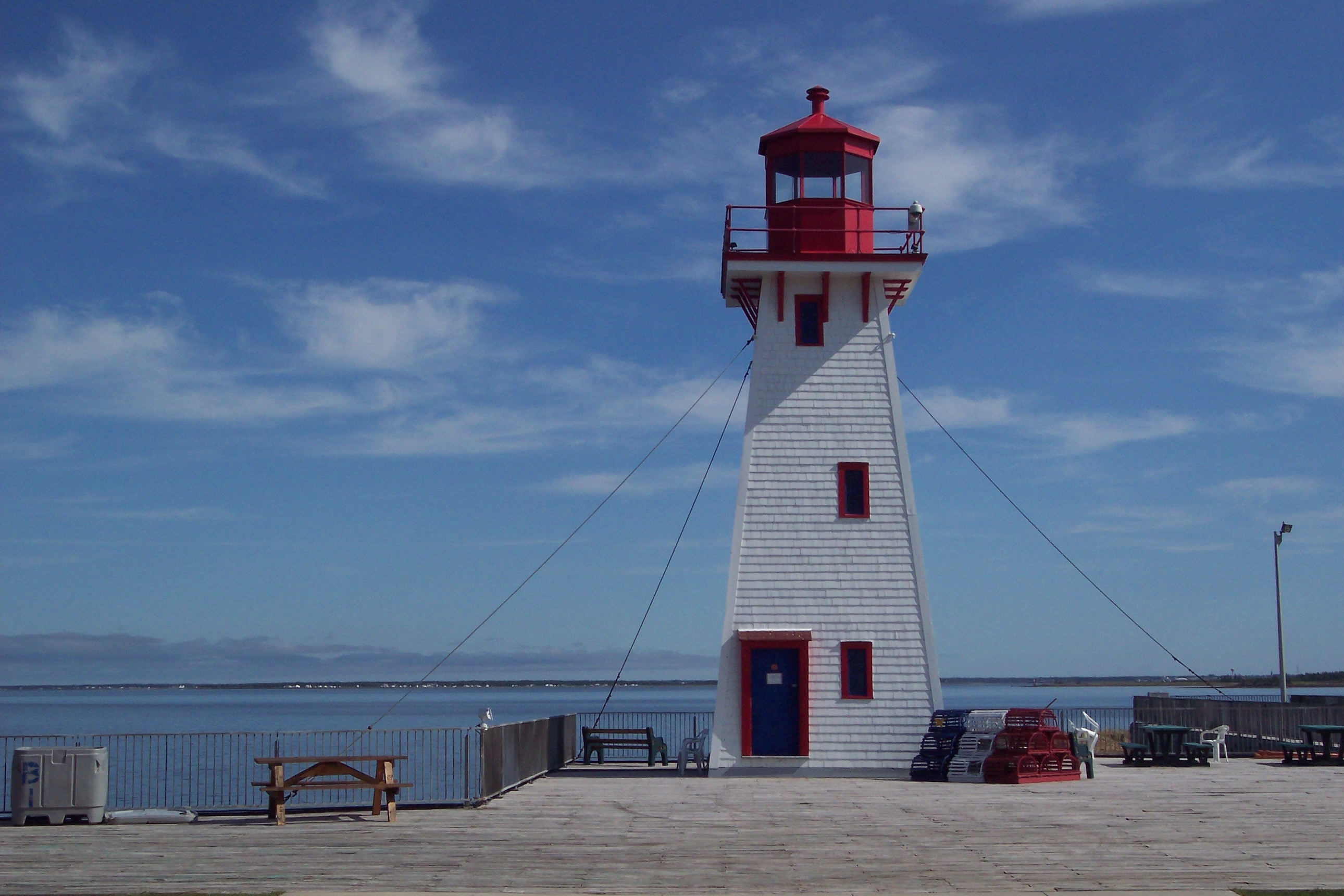
Île du Portage lighthouse in Shippagan. Some buildings are decorated with the Acadian flag, Gabriel and Evangeline and other cultural symbols.

The sea is a significant aspect of Acadian culture. Architectural elements reminiscent of lighthouses can be observed in various structures, including well shelters, birdhouses, garden kiosks, and former latrines. The bell tower of the Kouchibouguac church is shaped like a lighthouse. In recent years, the lighthouse has also emerged as a symbol of tourism in Acadia. In Caraquet, a lighthouse was constructed in Foley Park, while two port buildings in the vicinity incorporate lighthouses into their architectural design.

In the 18th century, families established their year-round homes further inland, and many built fishing cabins by the sea. This way of life lasted until the early 20th century and was observed mainly in Quebec between Natashquan and Blanc-Sablon and in northern New Brunswick, where the village of Maisonnette is said to have been named for this reason. Windy places were usually avoided for founding villages, and houses were usually protected on one side.

In Chéticamp and the Magdalen Islands, winds can be particularly strong, and half-gable roofs are preferred over full gables or three-quarter gables. This is due to the prevalence of the Suetes, a formidable southeast wind. In response, Chéticamp residents adapted their architecture by reinforcing the exposed side of the house with stones, having a lower roof on the exposed side than on the opposite side, and short eaves to prevent it from being torn off.It is not uncommon for house and barn frames to be reinforced on the seaward side.

In coastal regions, old fishing nets are occasionally used as fences. Windbreaks, fences constructed of stakes approximately 3.6 meters in height, are employed to safeguard residences and, on occasion, agricultural lands from offshore winds. In the Magdalen Islands, fences were typically constructed of intertwined branches.

The occurrence of shipwrecks involving timber-laden vessels was a common phenomenon, and the use of salvaged materials in construction was a significant practice during the 18th and 19th centuries. This was particularly evident in the Magdalen Islands, where the forest cover was rapidly depleted. The church of L'Étang-du-Nord is believed to have been constructed using wood from a shipwrecked English vessel.

Houses were rarely painted originally, and if they were, it was usually in red. Subsequently, Acadian settlements often became distinctive through the use of brightly colored boats and houses, with fishermen using leftover boat paint to paint their houses.

Although Madawaska is situated a considerable distance from the sea, certain maritime elements can be discerned in its architectural style. One such element is the "coudes," which are pieces of wood installed in the attic to reinforce the structure. Additionally, some houses featured boat ladders in lieu of staircases.

Riparian materials traditionally used in construction
Material	Addition	Transformation	Use
Shellfish	water	lime	Lime whitewash for wood and mortar, interior and exterior.
	water and sand	mortar	Wood and other material covering, caulking.
	mud, animal hair	mortar	Wood and other material covering, caulking.
Sea bass oil	gray earth	painting	Interior paint.
	red earth, red ochre	painting	Exterior paint.
Marsh grass			Roof covering, exterior wall siding.
Shore rush			Roof covering, wall siding, wall caulking.
Hay from dyked meadows			Roof covering, wall siding, wall caulking.
	mud and water	hollow-core slab	Interior wall plastering on wooden laths, chimney masonry on wooden laths.
Chondrus			Exterior wall siding.
Kelp			Exterior wall siding.
Shore mud	water	kiln-fired brick	Chimneys.

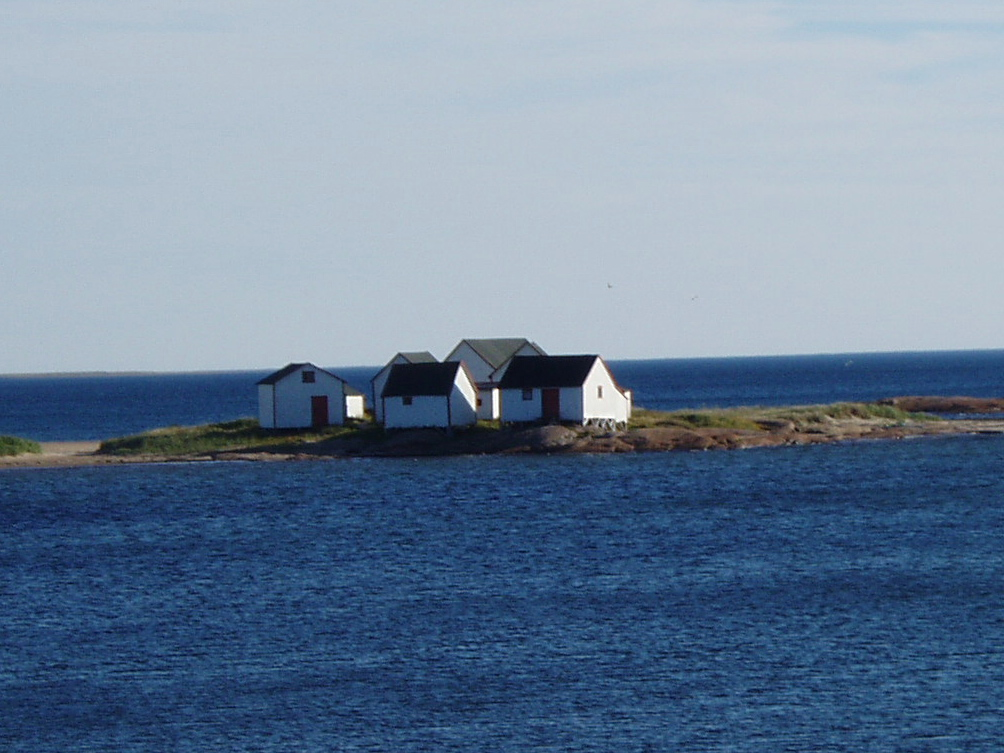
Fishermen's huts in Natashquan.

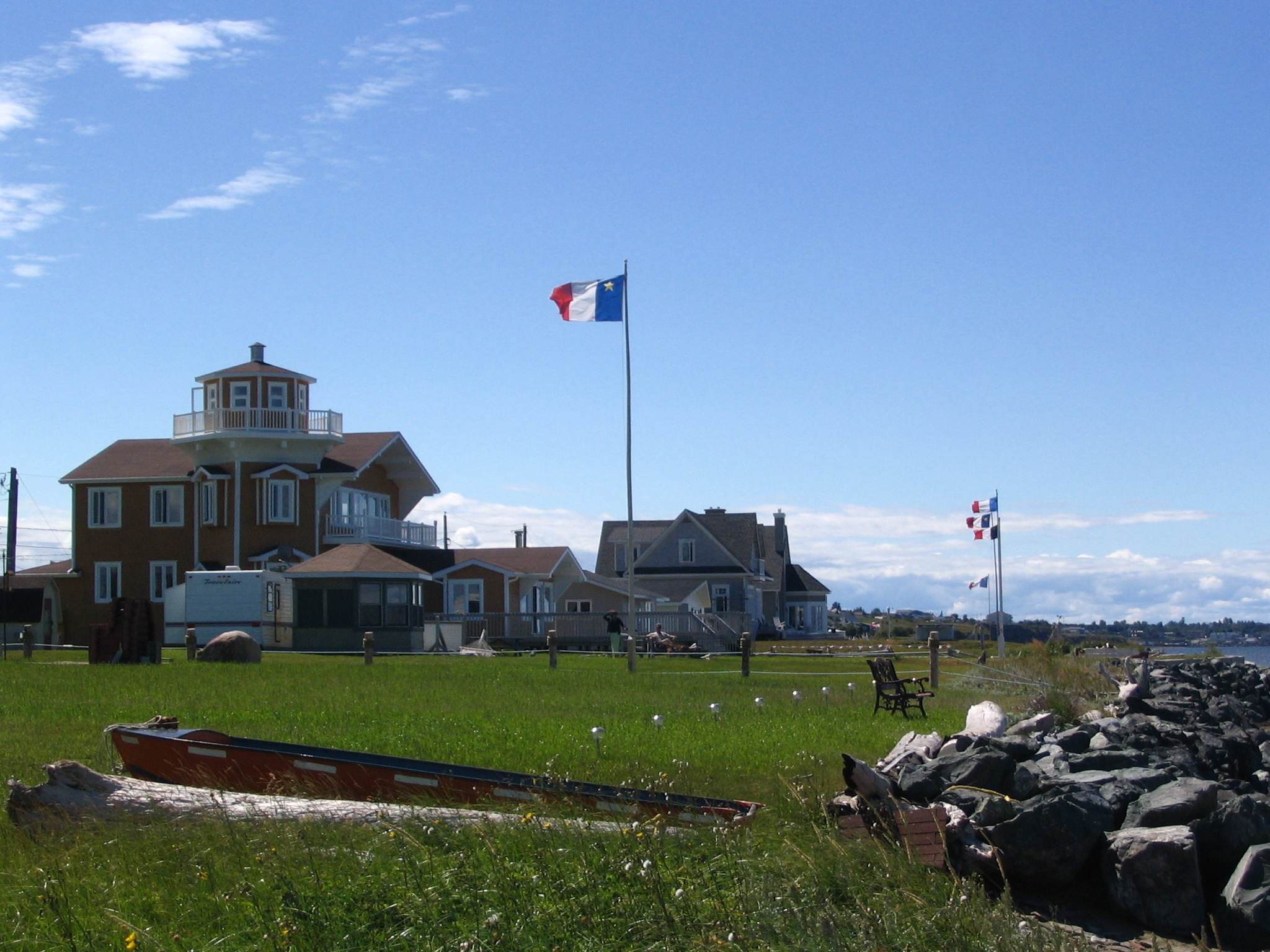
A lighthouse-like house with a sheltered façade in Caraquet.

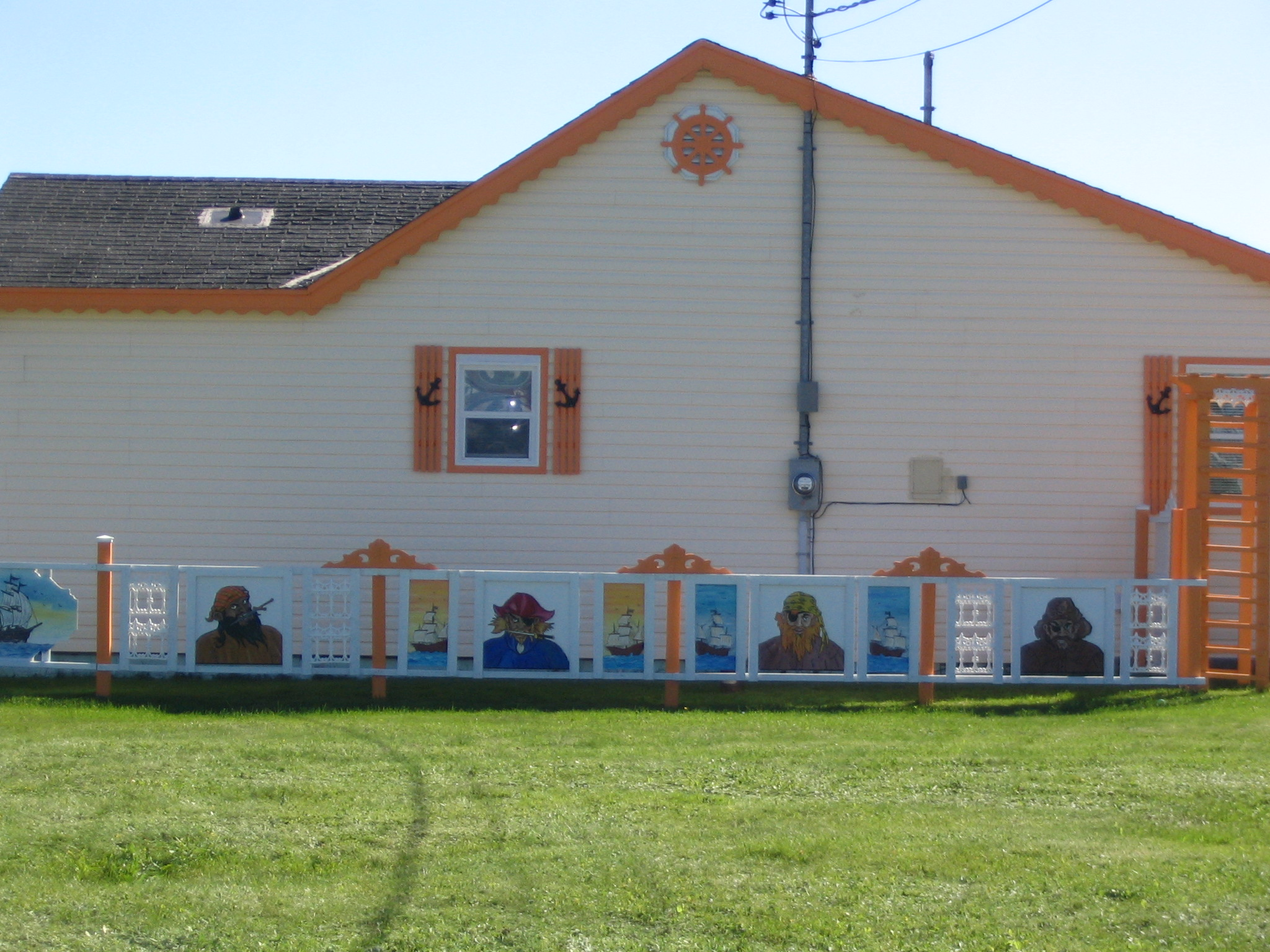
An Anse-Bleue house decorated with a maritime theme.

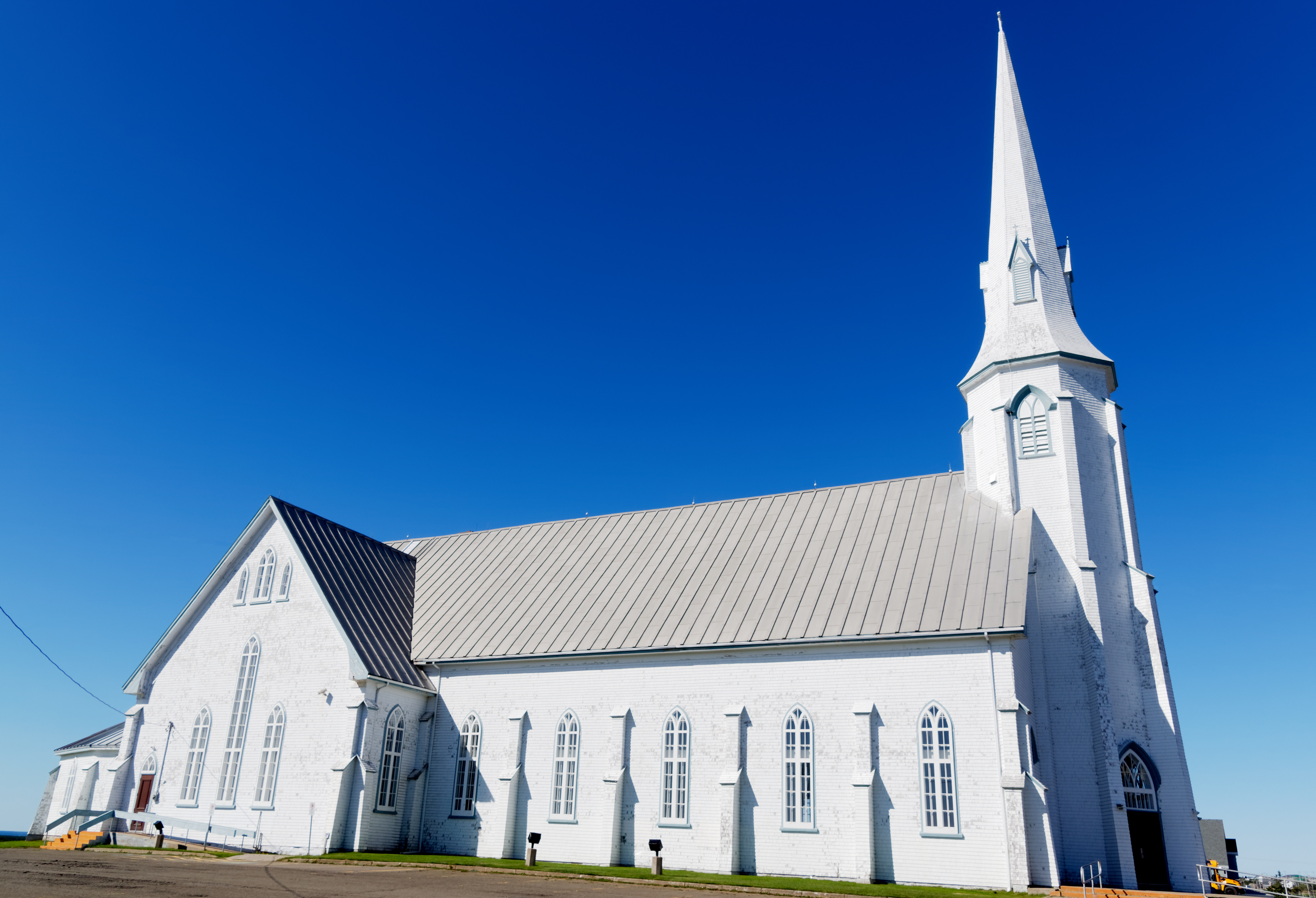
L'Étang-du-Nord church, said to have been built from shipwreck wood.

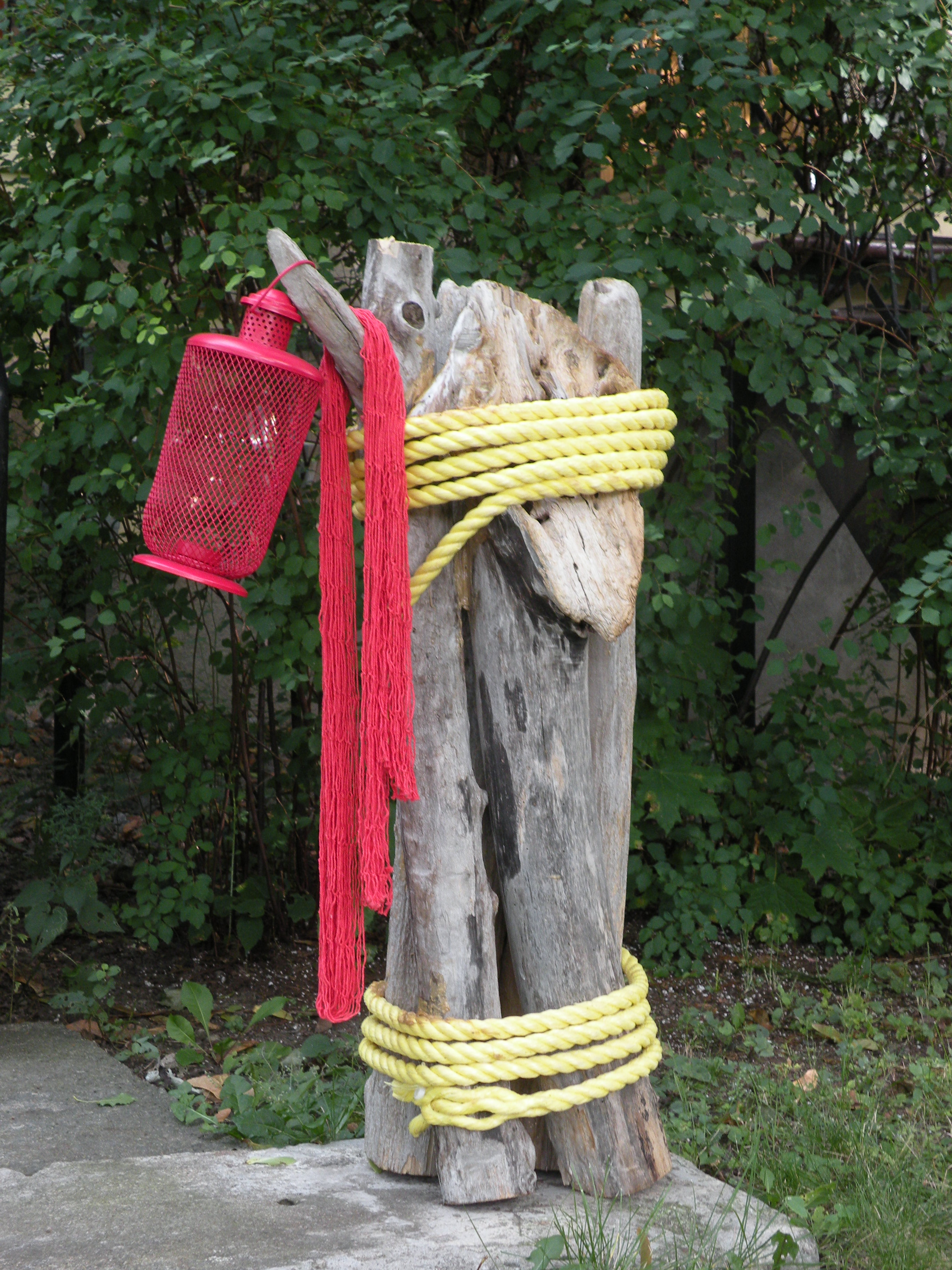
A Montreal decoration made from driftwood, rope, a lantern and a net.

=== Forest ===
Some Acadian communities situated at a distance from the sea developed distinctive aspects of their culture about farming and forestry. This is exemplified by the Brayons of Madawaska. Their traditional economy is based on flax cultivation, which was employed for various purposes, including caulking walls. Forestry, where sawdust rejected from sawmills was used similarly, also played a role. Moss was also used similarly. Birch bark was employed to cover exterior walls, a technique borrowed from the Maliseet.

== Architects ==
=== Works by English and Quebecois architects ===
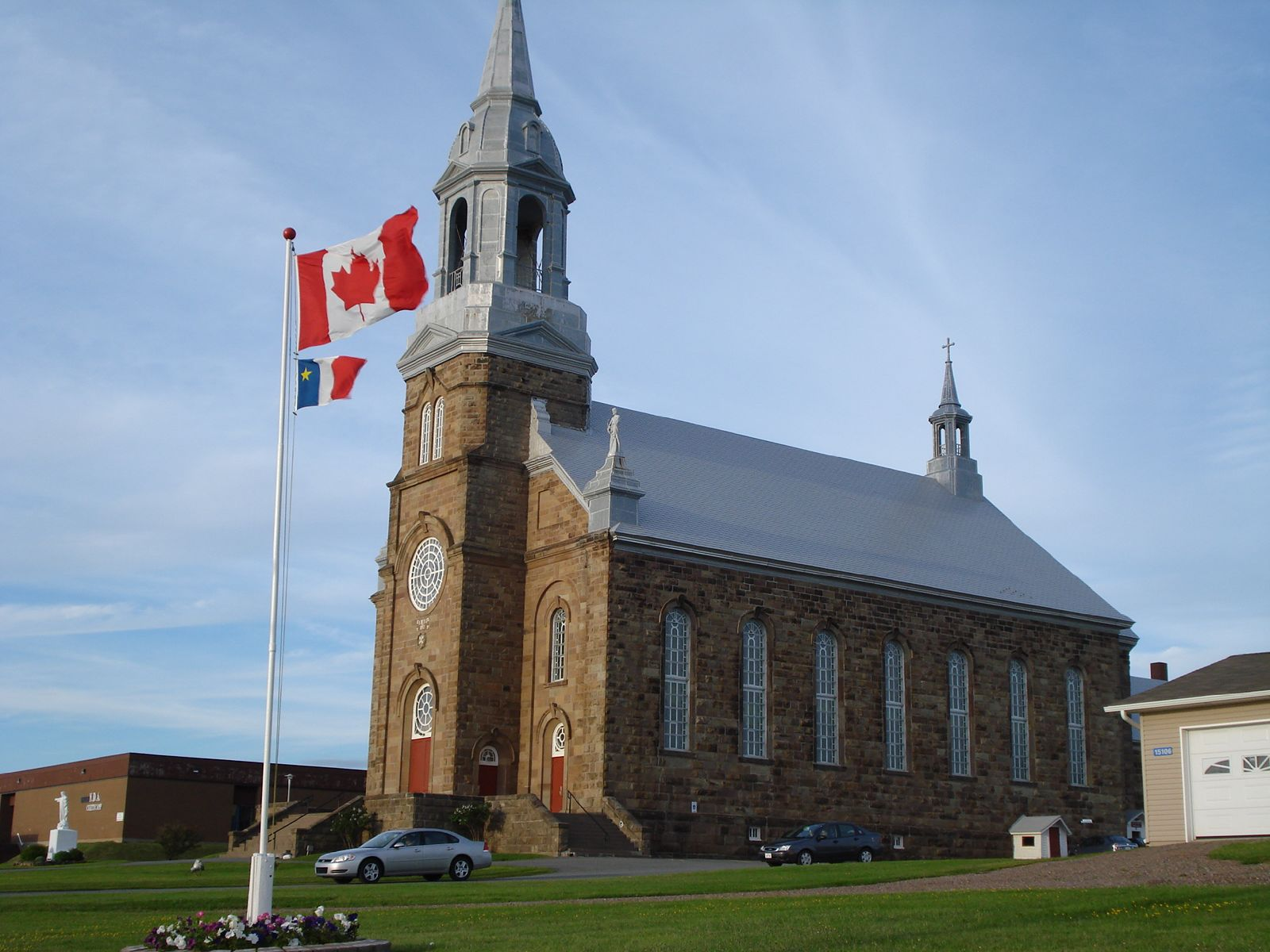
Saint-Pierre church in Chéticamp.

In the 19th century, buildings were typically designed in a simple manner, with more elaborate structures being entrusted to English-Canadian or Quebecois architects. Among these, David Ouellet stands out as the designer of the Saint-Pierre church in Chéticamp, which is regarded as one of the finest examples of Quebecois architecture in Acadia. Thomas Raymond designed the Saint-Isidore church, while Edgard Courchesnes contributed to the Saint-Jean-Baptiste church in Bouctouche.

The Acadian Eucher Duguay was a prominent contractor in the Acadian Peninsula during the late 19th century. Among his many contributions, he is known for having built the Sainte-Rose-de-Lima church.

=== Acadian architects ===
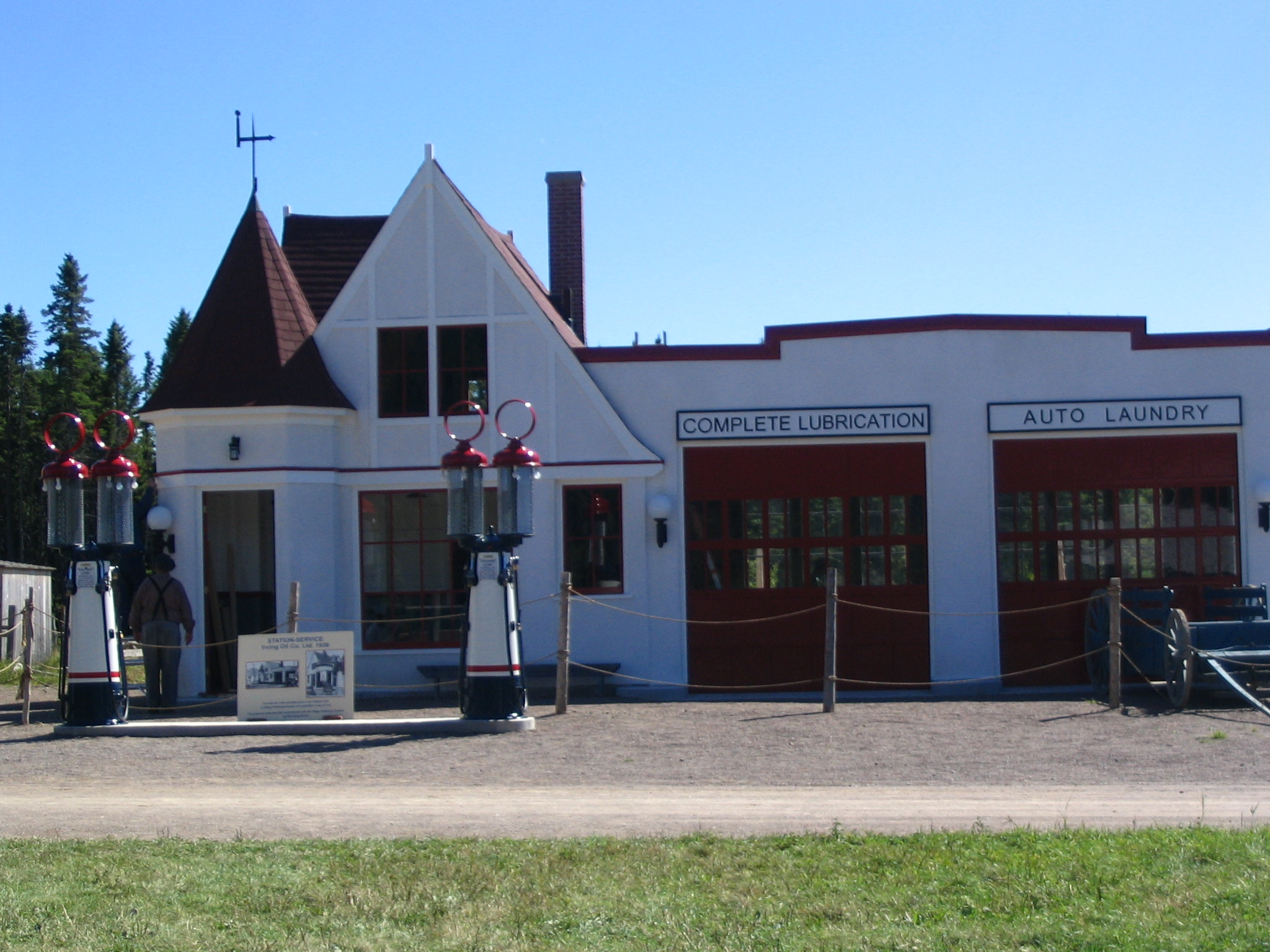
One of Samuel Roy's service stations, reproduced here at Village Historique Acadien.

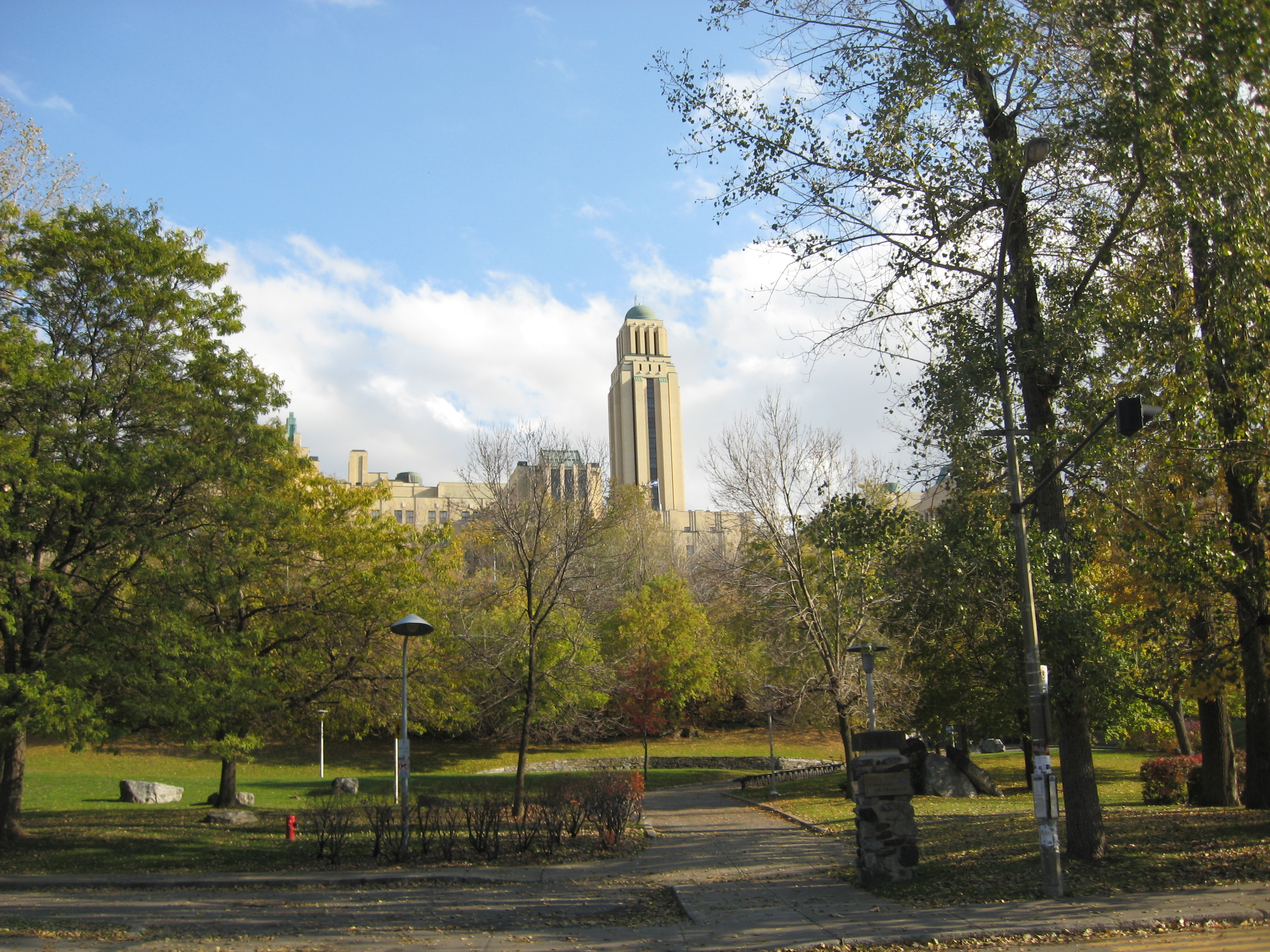
University of Montreal, by Ernest Cormier.

The first Acadian architect was Léon Léger (1848–1918), originally from Barachois. He studied various art forms at St. Joseph College and in Boston but focused on architectural ornamentation. Only a few of his works survive, but he is credited with one of the greatest achievements of the 19th century in New Brunswick: the Sacred Heart Chapel of the Immaculate Conception Convent in Bouctouche.

In contrast to Léon Léger, the brothers Nazaire Dugas (1864–1942) and Henri Dugas, originally from Caraquet, were the first to pursue higher studies in architecture in Montreal. Henri concentrated on construction and material fabrication, while Nazaire designed numerous buildings in the Acadian Peninsula, including the well-known Saint-Paul church in Bas-Caraquet, Saint-Joachim church in Bertrand, and Château Albert in Caraquet.

Another architect of note from this period was Anselme Roy (1895–1978), who is also known as Samuel Roy and hails originally from Sainte-Marie-de-Kent. He is responsible for designing many notable buildings, including the old Saint-Jean-Baptiste church in Bouctouche and Kenneth Colin Irving's manor. His most celebrated architectural achievement is the inaugural Irving Oil service station, constructed in the 1920s. This structure incorporates elements of Neo-Gothic, Tudor Revival, and Queen Anne styles, reflecting Roy's aspiration to establish a novel architectural idiom for a nascent business enterprise.

In the 20th century, René-Arthur Fréchette from Moncton designed the Grand-Pré memorial church and numerous churches in New Brunswick, including those in Saint-Antoine, Scoudouc, and Tracadie. Ernest Cormier (1885–1980), a Montreal native and graduate of the Polytechnique Montréal and the École Nationale Supérieure des Beaux-Arts in Paris, is the architect of the Supreme Court building of Canada and the University of Montreal. He is regarded as one of Montreal's most accomplished architects. Pierre Gallant, born in 1949 in Moncton and a graduate of the Technical University of Nova Scotia, is the architect responsible for several significant buildings in the city, including the National Bank and the Farmers' Market. He also contributed to the design of the new terminal. Elide Albert, born in 1939 in Caraquet and a graduate of St. Joseph College and the University of Montreal, is the author of the Bouctouche Dune Eco-park and contributed to the design of Pays de la Sagouine.

The first Acadian architecture firms were established in 1954 in Moncton (Leblanc et Gaudet) and Edmundston (Bélanger et Roy). In the 1960s, they demonstrated a certain creative autonomy, parallel to the work of sculptor Claude Roussel.

=== Schools ===
Canada boasts ten architecture schools, yet despite improvements in teaching over the past century, the Faculty of Architecture and Planning at Dalhousie University in Halifax is the only one located in the Acadian region. It offers courses only in English, although French-language schools exist at Laval University and the University of Montreal.

== Folklore ==
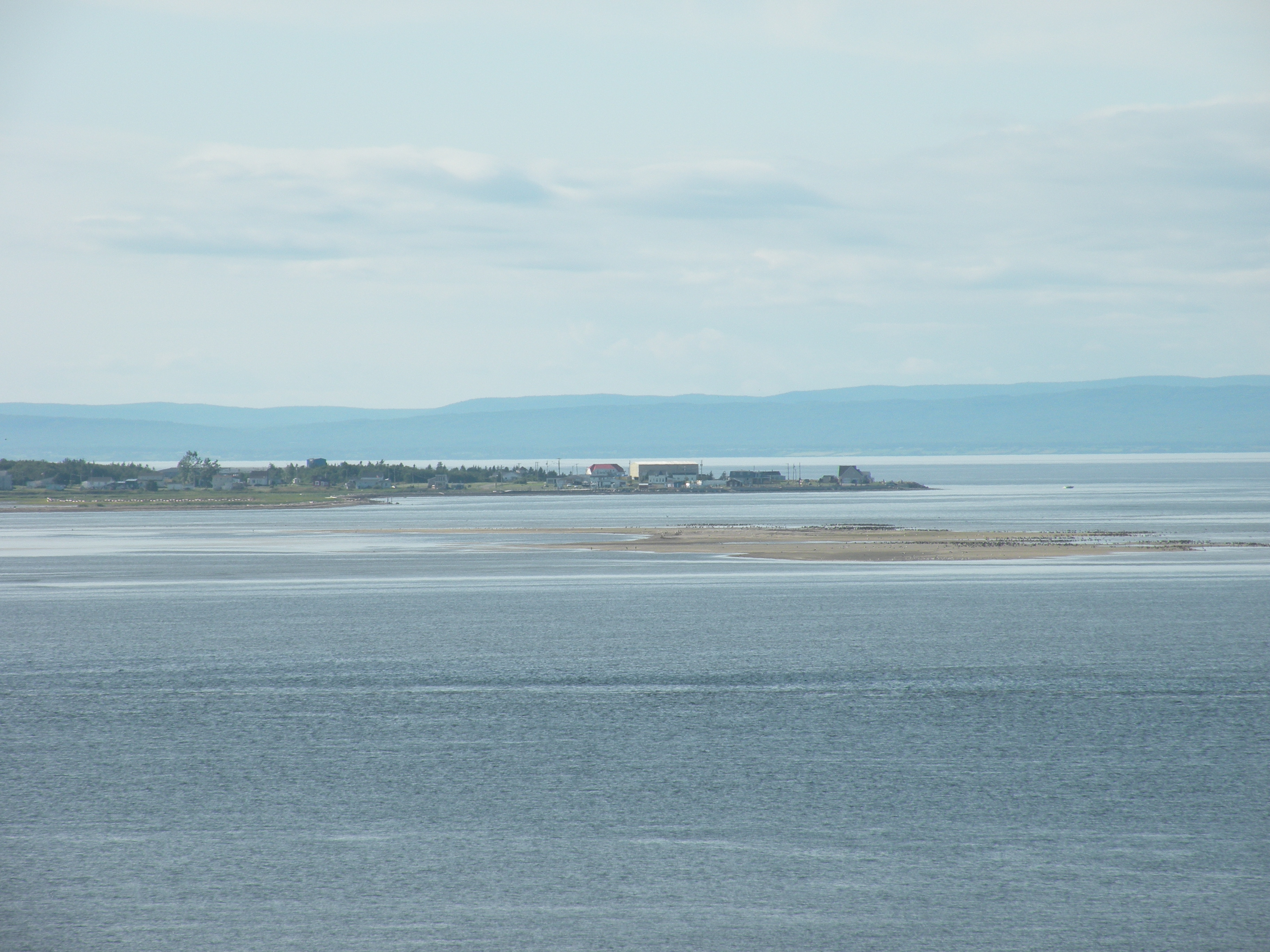
Maisonnette was so named either because fishermen had cabins there, or because the village's houses look very small when seen from Caraquet.

Architecture plays a significant role in Acadian folklore. During the construction of churches, recent coins and newspapers were buried, allowing for dating during the demolition process. It was believed that a church with buried coins under its doorstep would never experience financial difficulties. A custom observed by Quebec Acadians involved the father installing a milestone made of various objects and buried coins in the presence of a young child. This was done to help the child remember and to ensure that the plot of land was not encroached upon. The practice of salvaging wood from shipwrecks gave rise to a prayer that was recited by children in the Acadian region of Quebec: "My God, I would be a good girl/boy, but make sure for Dad that there is a shipwreck, no later than tomorrow." Construction projects, particularly those involving the construction of churches, were completed through the use of corvées. In the region of Madawaska, the maypole was planted after the last rafter of the frame had been nailed. Subsequently, a fir tree was positioned on the ridgepole, which was then dislodged after a shot was discharged. A banquet would then be convened. Upon the completion of the construction, a priest would arrive to bestow a blessing upon it.

== See also ==
- Architecture in the United States
- Architecture of Quebec
- List of historic places in Prince Edward Island
- Acadian diaspora
- Religion in Acadia
- Société Nationale de l'Acadie
- Acadian cinema

== Bibliography ==
- Chiasson, Anselme (1981). Les Îles de la Madeleine, vie matérielle et sociale de l'en premier (in French). Montreal: Leméac. ISBN 978-2-7609-5293-5.
- Dupont, Jean-Claude (1978). Histoire populaire de l'Acadie (in French). Montreal: Leméac. ISBN 978-2-7609-5278-2.
- Équipe du Village historique acadien (2003). Les Défricheurs d'eau (in French). Les Éditions de la Francophonie. ISBN 978-2-923016-14-6.
- Brun, Régis (1988). Les bâtiments anciens de la Mer Rouge (in French). Moncton: M. Henry.
- Katz, Ron (2004). La France en Amérique : héritage architectural de la colonisation à la naissance d'une nation (in French). Translated and illustrated by Arielle de La Tour d'Auvergne. Paris: Les Éditions du Pacifique. ISBN 978-2-87868-076-8.
- Cook, Jane Leigh (2001). Coalescence of styles : the ethnic heritage of St. John River Valley regional furniture, 1763–1851 (in French). McGill-Queen's Press - MQUP. ISBN 978-0-7735-2056-1.
- Mannell, Steven (2004). Atlantic Modern: The Architecture of the Atlantic Provinces 1950-2000. Halifax: Tuns Press. ISBN 0-929112-47-4.

=== Filmography ===
- Arsenault, Bettie (1985). Bateau bleu, maison verte (Movie) (in French). National Film Board of Canada.
