= Alexis Landry =

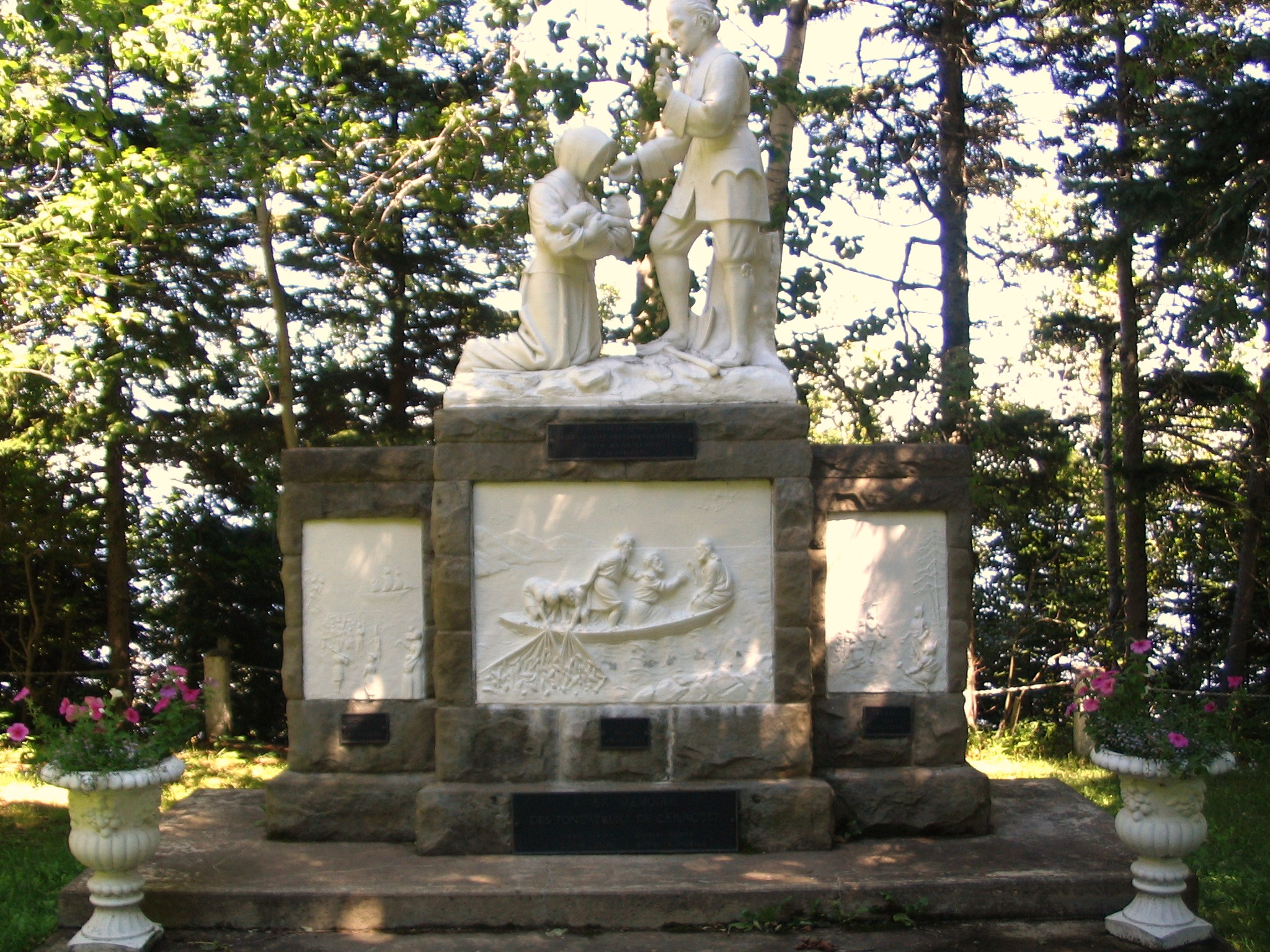
- Born: 1721; Grand-Pré, Nova Scotia
- Died: March 6, 1798; Caraquet, New Brunswick
- Occupations: Merchant; shipbuilder; Acadian pioneer
- Known for: Co‑founder of Caraquet
- Spouse: Marie Terriot
- Parent(s): Jean Landry; Claire Le Blanc

] Alexis Landry (1721 – March 6, 1798) was an Acadian merchant who helped establish the town of Caraquet.

The son of Jean Landry and Claire Le Blanc, he was born in Grand-Pré in what is now Nova Scotia. In 1743, he moved to the seigneury of Beaubassin. There he married Marie Terriot. Landry helped defend Fort Beauséjour against the British in 1755; the fort was captured by the British in June of that year. Landry and his family first arrived at Caraquet in 1757; they were forced to leave in 1761 after raids by the British but returned again in 1768. He was given official permission to settle there the following year and received title to his land in 1784. Landry was involved in trading and shipbuilding. In 1791, he had a chapel built at Caraquet.

He died in Caraquet in 1798, his body is sepulted in the Sainte-Anne-du-Bocage Sanctuary cemetery.
