= Chapel of Sainte-Anne de Beaumont =

Chapel in New Brunswick, Canada

Coordinates: 45°53′20″N 64°35′13″W

Chapele of Sainte-Anne
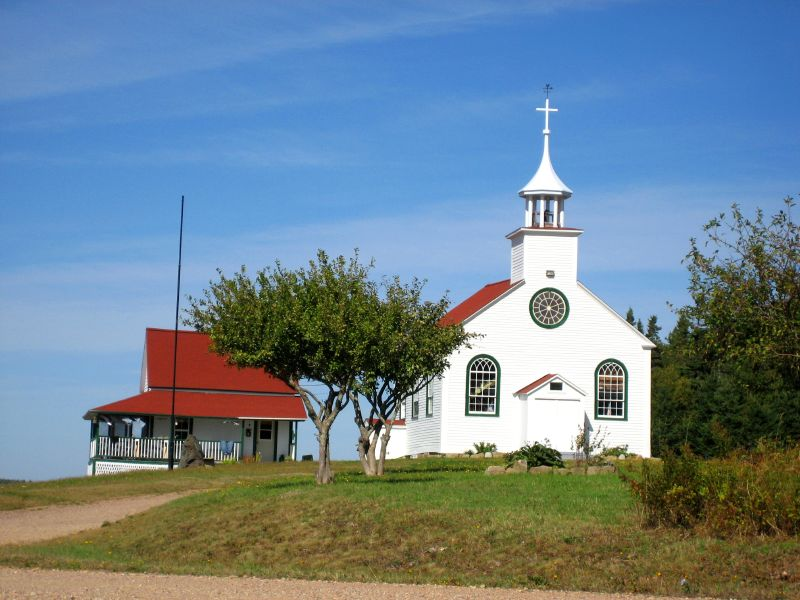
- The chapel seen from the south

Religion
- Affiliation: Catholic church
- Province: New Brunswick
- Region: Memramcook

Location
- Country: Canada
- Interactive map of Chapele of Sainte-Anne

Architecture
- Completed: 1842

The Chapel of Sainte-Anne de Beaumont is a Catholic place of worship, classified as a provincial historic site, located in the hamlet of Beaumont, Memramcook, New Brunswick, Canada. It is a Georgian-style wooden building, built in 1842 by the Mi'kmaq of Fort Folly. The site also includes a presbytery, cemetery and monuments.

== Etymology ==
The hamlet of Beaumont takes its name from Jacques Bonnevie, known as Beaumont, an Acadian who lived in the area around 1740. The chapel was named Sainte-Anne when it was built in 1842. Sainte Anne, mother of the Virgin Mary, is the patroness saint of the Mi'kmaq.

== History ==
A cemetery was used on the site from 1829 until 1938.

Around 1830, the sale of alcohol and bad weather affecting the crops made life difficult for the Mi'kmaq. In 1837, Memramcook priest Ferdinand Gauvreau was appointed Indian Commissioner for Westmorland County. In July of that year, at a general meeting of the region's Mi'kmaq presided over by Gauvreau, those present elected Peter Bernard as chief. Bernard and Gauvreau discussed a fixed community settlement where the Mi'kmaq could do more farming. In June 1838, Chief Bernard, armed with a letter from Gauvreau, talked to Edward Barron Chandler about ways to stop the sale of alcohol. He also told him about the community project. In subsequent meetings, they agreed that the county should purchase land. The land chosen was on the banks of the Petitcodiac River, just south of Beaumont. The 64 acres (26 ha), purchased for £50 on July 15, 1840, had been owned since 1820 by Amasa and Sally Weldon, who had bought the land from Joseph Frederick Wallet Desbarres. The reserve became known as Fort Folly 27. The population probably moved shortly afterwards, in late summer or autumn.

In 1840, the Acadians of Saint-Anselme and Memramcook built large churches. In 1841, the people of Beaumont decided to build a chapel to better serve their community. The chapel was built in 1842, making it the oldest Catholic place of worship used by Micmacs in New Brunswick. The Mi'kmaq supplied the wood, and the Acadians helped with the work free of charge. According to an article by P. William Bourque, the church was built by the government to avoid Mi'kmaq solidarity with the Acadians. Master carpenter Hilaire Arsenault oversaw the construction. Born in Barachois, he built several churches in the region, including the one in his native village. Chief Peter Bernard designed the plans for the building. The chapel was consecrated in autumn 1943 by Abbé Gauvreault. Chief Bernard's house was later converted into a presbytery. The chapel interior was restored in 1900. The pews and rood screen date from this period.

The Beaumont reserve was sold to Father Massé on August 21, 1965, and the Mi'kmaq moved to the new Fort Folly reserve near Dorchester. Father Massé then gave the reserve to the Holy Cross Fathers, who eventually ceded it to the Archdiocese of Moncton.

Robert Léger of the Memramcook Valley Historical Society developed the chapel restoration project in the 1980s. Thanks to donations and a grant from the federal government, over $10,000 was raised to pay for the work. The work, which lasted just over a year until 1989, involved repairing the roof of the chapel and presbytery, the foundations and gallery of the presbytery, redoing the rose window and reinstalling the lamp.

The chapel and its site became a provincial historic site on June 19, 1989, making it the first protected Amerindian place of worship in the province. A ceremony presided over by Lieutenant-Governor Gilbert Finn and attended by 300 people took place on July 23, and a commemorative plaque was installed. The "Burial Place of the Ancestors" project was then initiated by the Fort Folly First Nation, with the aim of creating a historical park. An archaeological dig was carried out in 1992, clearing the land, recovering artifacts and demarcating the cemetery. The Memramcook Historical Society proposed building a historical village near the chapel. In 1996, the floor was redone and the interior repainted. The presbytery was renovated in 1997, and a new bell tower was installed in May of the same year.

== Architecture ==
The chapel's style is simple and Georgian. The exterior walls are clapboarded. The windows have neo-Gothic pointed arch surrounds set in Romanesque semicircular frames. The façade features a bull's eye above the main entrance and is topped by a bell tower. The façade also features an entrance drum, an addition to the original plan. A cornerstone bears the inscription "1842". The chapel seats around 50 people. The wooden altar may be the work of sculptor Louis-Thomas Berlinguet. The interior is decorated with wooden moldings and a painted halo on the ceiling. Several objects are displayed in the chapel, including traditional Mi'kmaq costumes, dream catchers and a statue of Kateri Tekakwitha.

== Cemetery and monuments ==
A cemetery was located on the chapel grounds, slightly to the east. Most of the headstones have disappeared, but the names of 79 deceased were preserved at the Pré-d'en-Haut church. Sixty-nine headstones were installed in the 1990s by the Mi'kmaq to commemorate their ancestors.

The white cross at the back of the cemetery commemorates Henriette Bernard, known as Mercure, daughter of the Chief of Beaumont, who drowned while saving her friend René Belliveau.

The old bell tower is on display in the cemetery. A grotto dedicated to Sainte-Anne was installed in 2006.

== The culture ==
Part of the film Acadieman vs CMA 2009 takes place on the chapel grounds.

== Bibliography ==
- Deux cents ans de vie paroissiale à Memramcook, 1781-1981. Comité du Livre du bicentenaire de la Paroisse Saint-Thomas de Memramcook. 1981.
- Gaudet, Gustave (1984). La vallée de Memramcook : hier-aujourd'hui. Shédiac: chez l'auteur. ISBN 0969194102.
- Léger, Louise; LeBlanc, Charline; Cormier, Josanne (1982). Memramcook : initiation historique. Memramcook: SHVM.

== See also ==
- Fort Folly First Nation
- Memramcook
- Sainte-Anne-du-Bocage Sanctuary
