= Sainte-Anne-du-Bocage Sanctuary =

Catholic sanctuary in Caraquet, Canada

Saint-Anne-du-Bocage Sanctuary
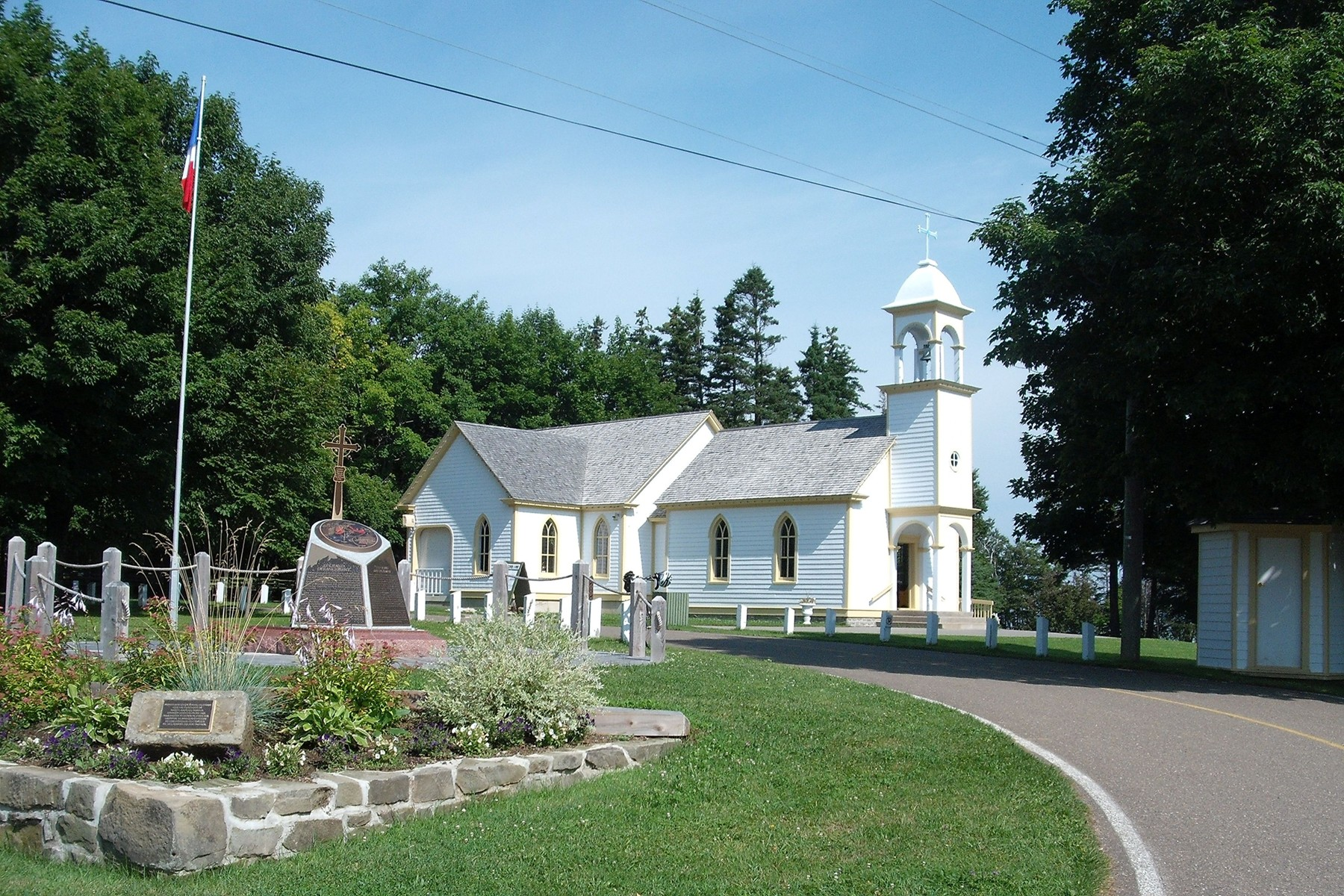
- Interactive map of the Saint-Anne-du-Bocage Sanctuary area

General information
- Type: Sanctuary
- Architectural style: Acadian Architecture
- Location: Caraquet city, New Brunswick province., Canada
- Coordinates: 47°46′26″N 65°0′40″W
- Years built: Restoration and extensions in 1904, 1909 and 1999.
- Construction started: 1832
- Completed: 1836
- Owner: Municipality of the Bellême commune

Design and construction
- Awards: Historic Site (2006)
- Designations: Ascribed to the Roman Catholic Diocese of Bathurst jurisdiction from the Catholic Church confession

Sainte-Anne-du-Bocage, or simply Le Bocage, is a Catholic sanctuary in Caraquet, New Brunswick (Canada).

Built on the land bequeathed by Alexis Landry in 1791, the sanctuary includes a chapel, a Stations of the Cross, a well, a fountain, a cemetery, and monuments, all set in a bocage. The chapel, one of the oldest Acadian places of worship, is also an enigma. The exact reason for its construction is unknown, but it is linked to the historical quarrel between the inhabitants of the east and west of the town. The sanctuary became a place of pilgrimage in the second half of the 19th century, and is still very popular with both locals and tourists.

== Location ==
Sainte-Anne-du-Bocage is located west of Caraquet.

Sainte-Anne-du-Bocage is located in the western part of Caraquet. It is accessible via Saint-Pierre-Ouest Boulevard (route 11). The site sits on a plateau almost seven meters above Caraquet Bay. Sainte-Anne-du-Bocage is also the name given to the neighborhood in which the park is located.

The Sainte-Anne-du-Bocage woodland is mainly made up of spruce and beech trees.

Sainte-Anne-du-Bocage is part of the Saint-Jean-Eudes pastoral unit, which includes the parish of Saint-Simon, the parish of Saint-Pierre-aux-Liens in Caraquet, the parish of Saint-Paul in Bas-Caraquet and the parish of Saint-Joachim in Bertrand. The pastoral unit is part of the Diocese of Bathurst.

== History ==
=== Origins ===
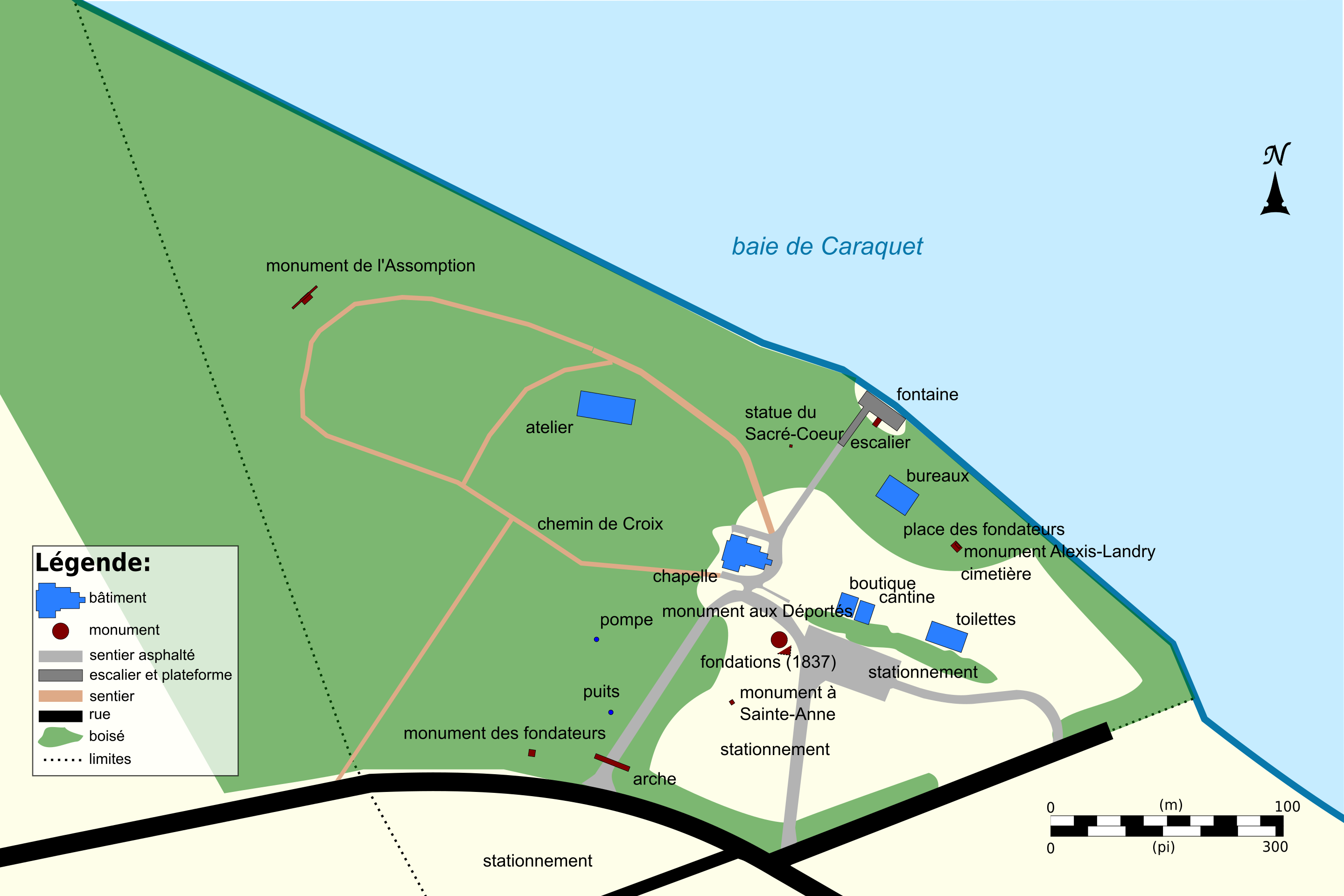
Map of the sanctuary

Alexis Landry (1721–1798), a merchant born in Grand-Pré and a survivor of the Expulsion of the Acadians, settled in Caraquet probably around 1757 with three other families. Escaping deportation again during Roderick MacKenzie's raid in 1761, Landry left his land with his family for a few years to ensure his safety. In the spring of 1768, the Landrys returned and on March 13, 1769, Judge George Walker officially allowed them to settle on the site they had occupied in 1761, on condition that it was not already occupied. Alexis Landry received official title to the site in 1784.

It is thought that a church already existed on the Sainte-Anne-du-Bocage site in 1784, or perhaps as early as 1772 or 1771. This church, dedicated to Sainte Anne, would have been built out of logs on land donated by Landry, with the permission of the Jesuit Jean-Baptiste de La Brosse. In fact, Landry is said to have had a statue of Sainte-Anne installed as soon as he arrived in 1757. Before the missionaries were sent, and during their absence, Alexis Landry celebrated white masses, i.e. without a priest.

In 1766, barely ten years after the Deportation of the Acadians, the Bishop of Quebec promised to send a missionary to serve all the Acadians in the Maritimes. Because of its geographical position and the size of its population, Caraquet was frequently visited by missionaries. The first was Charles-François Bailly de Messein (1768–1773), followed by Joseph-Mathurin Bourg (1773–1785) and Antoine Girouard (1785–1787), who became the first resident missionary in Caraquet in 1787. In 1786, Abbé Girouard tried unsuccessfully to move the church to the center of town and then apparently had it renovated. Mathurin Bourg was again a resident of Caraquet from 1787 to 1794. In 1791, Alexis Landry took steps to have a church built there. Mathurin Bourg wanted it to be built near the cemetery, although he had already been planning for several years to build a church in a more central location. On July 10, 1793, Landry gave up part of his estate for the building, on condition that he and his heirs would have the free use of an enclosed fishing bank and that the cost of his funeral would be covered by the fabric. Olivier Blanchard was awarded the building contract. The church was blessed in July 1794 by Abbé Bourg. It was built out of logs, piece on piece, the type of construction most common among Acadians between 1755 and the early 19th century. After the church was built, the following missionaries celebrated masses there: Jean-Baptiste Castanet (1794–1795), Mathurin Bourg (1795–1796), Jean-Baptiste Castanet (1796–1797), Louis-Joseph Desjardins (1797–1798), René-Pierre Joyer (1798–1806), Urbain Orfroy (1806–1813) and Phil-Antoine Parent (1813–1817). Thomas Cooke became a resident missionary at Sainte-Anne-du-Bocage in 1817.

A fire destroyed several buildings on August 28, 1795, but the church was spared when the wind suddenly changed direction; according to Alexis Landry, it was the fulfilment of a promise that saved the church.

=== Caraquet church ===
The church of Sainte-Anne-du-Bocage was too far away for the inhabitants of the eastern part of the town and was accordingly abandoned around 1818. After a lengthy process, a new church was finally built in the same year in the Pointe-Rocheuse district, near the present-day Saint-Pierre-aux-Liens church, a more central location. A new chapel, the one visible today, was nevertheless built in Le Bocage. According to Rosemonde Landry, it was built between 1829 and 1844, while a letter discovered by Fidèle Thériault states that it was built in 1836 or later; other sources mention an interval between 1832 and 1836. In addition to its unusual architecture, it seems that the chapel was not used regularly for mass. Three popular hypotheses explain why it was built: the first is that it was a monument to the survivors of the Deportation; the second is that it was a way for parishioners to improve their chances of having a church in their area; and finally, according to the third hypothesis, it was a chapel built by sailors who had survived a shipwreck as a tribute to their survival. Construction of a stone church measuring 48 feet by 120 feet began in 1837. However, work was halted in 1853 due to a lack of funds and a decision by the bishop. Saint-Pierre-aux-Liens church was finally built in the center of Caraquet between 1857 and 1860.

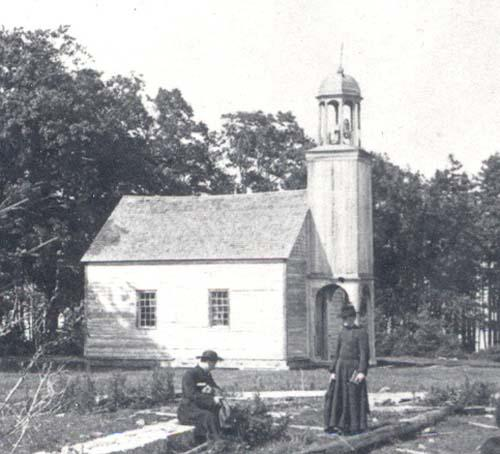
The chapel c. 1905.

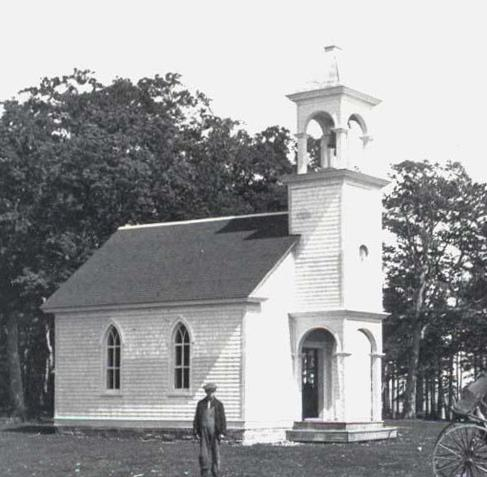
The chapel c. 1930.

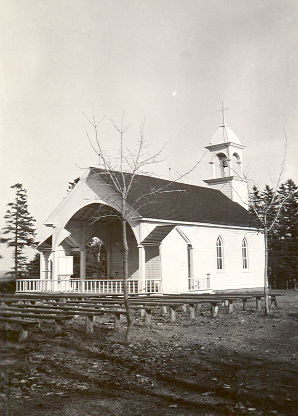
Rear of the chapel, c. 1942.

=== From chapel to sanctuary ===
Several sources mention 1914 as the year of the first Sainte-Anne pilgrimage, at the time of a shipwreck. Louis-Joseph Desjardins, a missionary between 1797 and 1798, had already proposed setting up a pilgrimage. In fact, according to Rosemonde Cormier's research, the first pilgrimage took place on July 26, 1857, following a shipwreck on July 22 that claimed 56 lives. The first major pilgrimage took place in 1880. The first mention in the press dates from that year, but the first real account was not published until 1886.

The Caraquet & Gulf Shore railway was built nearby in 1887, and even before the work was completed in November, the train made a stop at Sainte-Anne-du-Bocage station, allowing pilgrims from as far away as Bathurst to come to the shrine. Tickets were half-price on St Anne's Day, as the company encouraged such celebrations. The chapel was renovated in 1904 and Gothic-style windows were installed a few years later. An extension to the rear of the chapel, allowing masses to be celebrated outside, was inaugurated in 1909. On June 4, 1914, the four sailors on the schooner Mary Jane made a pilgrimage to Sainte-Anne-du-Bocage as soon as they arrived in port to thank the saint for saving them during a storm. A staircase leading to the so-called miraculous spring, as well as a grotto housing a statue, were built and blessed the same year.

The pilgrimage, which at the time was the responsibility of the parish, was taken over by the Redemptorists of Sainte-Anne-de-Beaupré, Quebec, in 1920. A museum was opened in the sanctuary in 1940, containing letters, maps, objects of worship previously used in the chapel, and other items, including some that belonged to Alexis Landry. In 1947, Martin Lavigne of Bathurst claimed to have been miraculously cured of a disability after the pilgrimage, attracting a record crowd of probably 20,000 the following year. The ritual of blessing the sick was introduced in 1949.

In 1951, the Capuchins of Bathurst and Listuguj (Quebec) took over from the Redemptorists in organizing the pilgrimage. Construction of a Stations of the Cross in the bocage woodland began that same year. In addition, the Sainte-Anne novena was distributed from Listuguj, for those unable to travel to the pilgrimage; this alliance meant that the cult of Sainte-Anne in Acadia was no longer marginalized by its association with the Mi'kmaq.

In the 1950s, the cult of Notre-Dame de l'Assomption, the patron saint of Acadia, became very important, and a statue of her was unveiled in 1952. According to Denise Lamontagne, this meant that the cult of Sainte-Anne au Bocage now complemented that of Mary. Construction of the Stations of the Cross was completed in 1954, the Marian year, with the installation of the fifteen mysteries of the rosary. The portal was built in 1955 to celebrate the 200th anniversary of the Deportation of the Acadians. A stone and bronze monument to Alexis Landry was unveiled in 1956 to mark the 75th anniversary of the First Acadian National Convention, held in Memramcook in 1881. Historical events and personalities, including Alexis Landry and Marcel-François Richard, are highlighted during novenas, making the Bocage a place to commemorate Acadian nationalism.

The monument to Alexis Landry was replaced by a stone monument unveiled in 1961 by French writer Henri Queffélec. A replica of the chapel as it existed before 20th-century renovations were built in the 1970s at the Village Historique Acadien Provincial Park, a tourist site near Caraquet that recreates life from 1770 to 1939 using some forty buildings and costumed interpreters. In 1975, a public toilet was built on the site, while the interior of the chapel was restored. In 1984, four pilgrims walking toward the Bocage were killed in Paquetville. Stones were installed on the banks of the park in 1996 to protect it from increasing erosion. The chapel was renovated and enlarged in 1999. It became a municipal historic site on November 1, 2006. On July 26, 2004, to mark the 400th anniversary of Acadia, Cardinal Marc Ouellet celebrated a mass attended by more than 10,000 people. A monument commemorating the Great Upheaval was unveiled on July 28, 2007. The spring was rebuilt in 2011 after a storm.

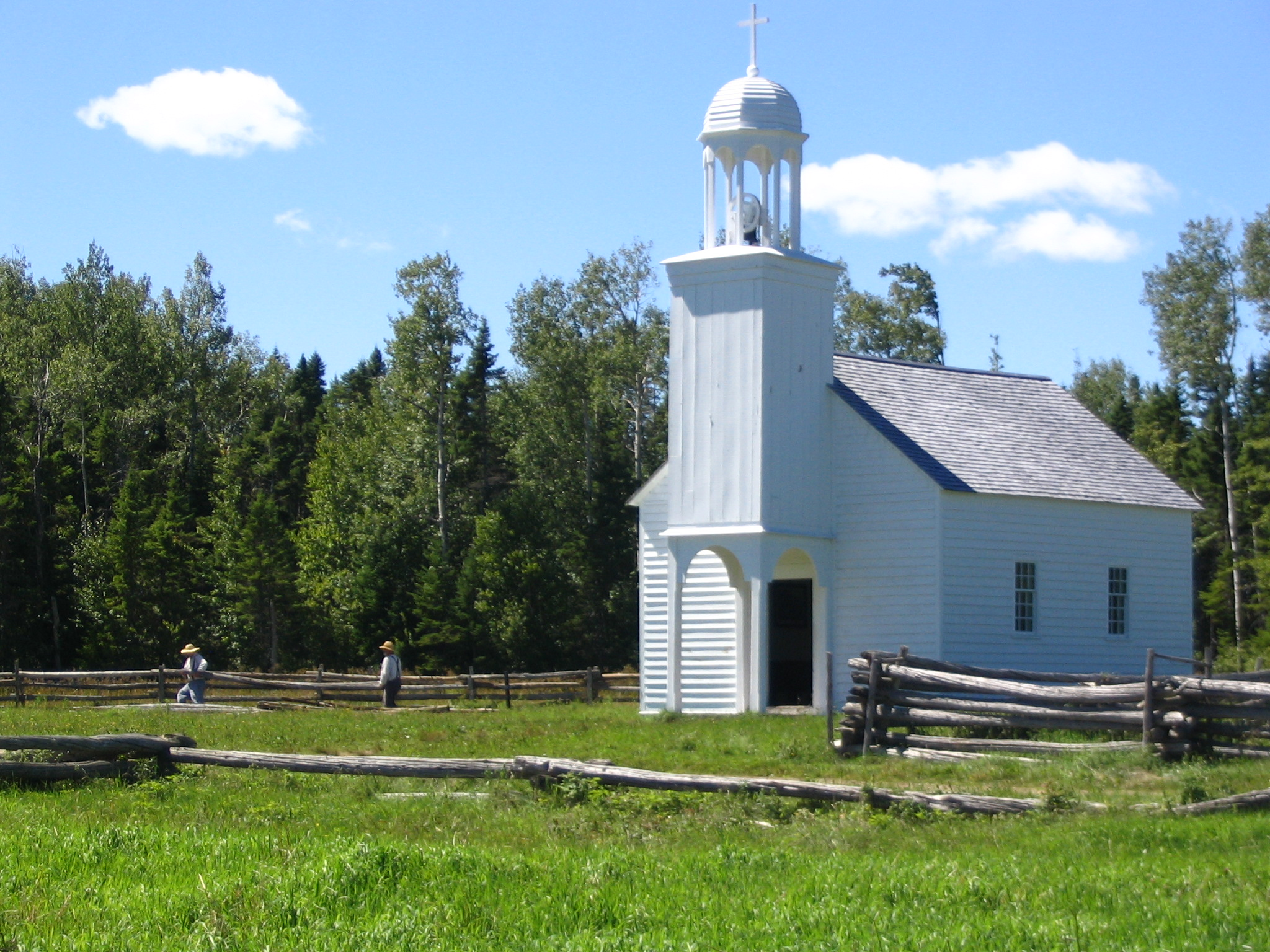
Exterior of the replica chapel at the Historic Acadian Village.

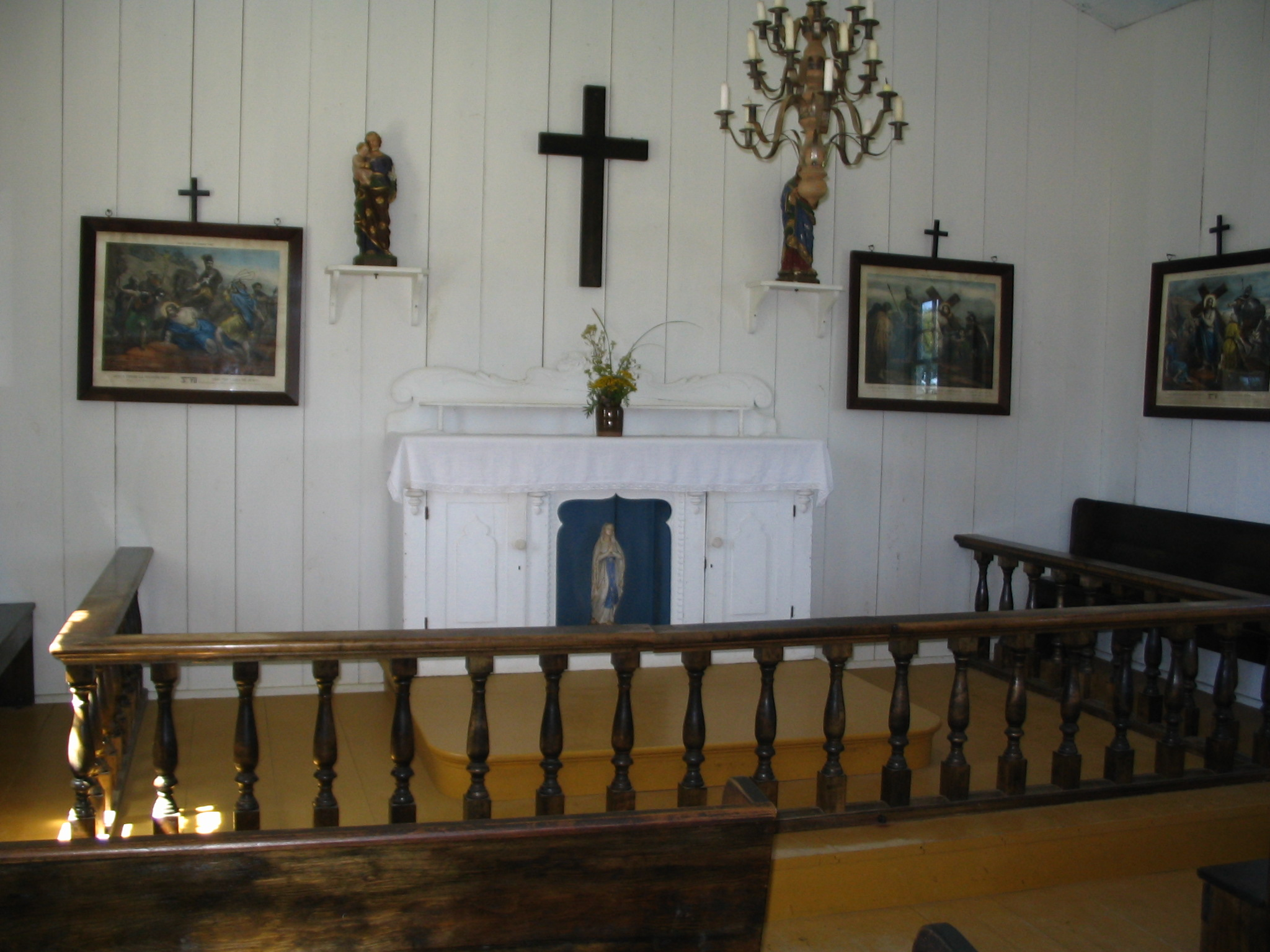
The altar in the replica chapel.

== Buildings and facilities ==
After the portal onto Saint-Pierre Boulevard, a tree-lined driveway leads northwards to the chapel. On the west side of the driveway is a well and a manual water pump. The cemetery is to the east, opposite the chapel. Between the two, a path leads to the steps of the miraculous spring. In the hedgerow behind the chapel is a Stations of the Cross leading to the monument dedicated to Notre-Dame de l'Assomption.

=== The chapel ===
The chapel is in the Acadian Gothic Revival style, in use throughout Acadia from the mid-nineteenth century to the early twentieth century. The chapel is indistinguishable from the houses of the period, except for its bell tower and the absence of ceiling joists. Furthermore, its architecture is not typical of churches of the period, with no sacristy, tabernacle, confessional or even heating. On the other hand, the attention paid to the balustrade and the painting of the ceiling demonstrates the care taken in the construction of this building. The chapel has a wooden framing, white paneling, and beige corner boards. The roof has two slopes. The symmetrical façade has a three-story bell tower. The first is a porch giving access to the chapel, with four arches. The second is simply pierced by a oeil-de-boeuf. The third is made up of four arches supporting a square-sided dome, finally topped by a cross.

The building is divided into two main rooms. The oldest part, at the entrance, has a rectangular, single-story floor plan built on a stone foundation. The interior has undergone a few changes since it was built in 1840. The ceiling is vaulted and the walls have vertical paneling, all made of white-painted pine. The floor is also made of pine, assembled with wooden pegs but not painted. There are six pews. The altar on the back (west) wall is carved in wood and painted white and gold. It has three levels. The first level features a cross pattée and the second level has an arcade motif. On the third level is a statue of Saint Anne teaching the Virgin Mary to read. There is also a statue in each corner, Jesus on the right and the Virgin Mary on the left. There are two paintings on either side of the altar. The one on the left depicts Saint Anne and was donated by Louis-Joseph Desjardins in 1845. The one on the right depicts Saint Anthony and was installed in 1925. A stoup at the entrance is carved from a single block of wood. Other items on display in the chapel include historical photos, a Stations of the Cross, and prayer beads. A banner is now kept at the Caraquet Acadian Museum.

On the north wall of the chapel is a plaque bearing the following text:

AUX FONDATEURS

DE LA PAROISSE DE CARAQUET

ALEXIS LANDRY EPOUX DE MARIE TERRIOT

CHARLES POIRIER EPOUX DE MADELEINE LANDRY

OLIVIER LEGERE EPOUX DE MARIE JOSEPH HEBERT

OLIVIER BLANCHARD EPOUX DE CATHERINE MIREAU

The second part of the chapel, separated from the first by a common apse, is the altar of a chapel opening onto the woodland, and rows of pews are therefore installed outside. It is built on a cement foundation. This second chapel has an altar made of unhewn stone bonded with mortar, topped with a wooden plank, and decorated at the front with a brass bas-relief of the Last Supper. The vertical or diagonal paneling is simply varnished. The apse features the flag of Acadia, the words Ave maris stella, which is the name of the Acadian hymn, and wooden silhouettes of seagulls. There is also a statue of Sainte Anne teaching the Virgin Mary to read.

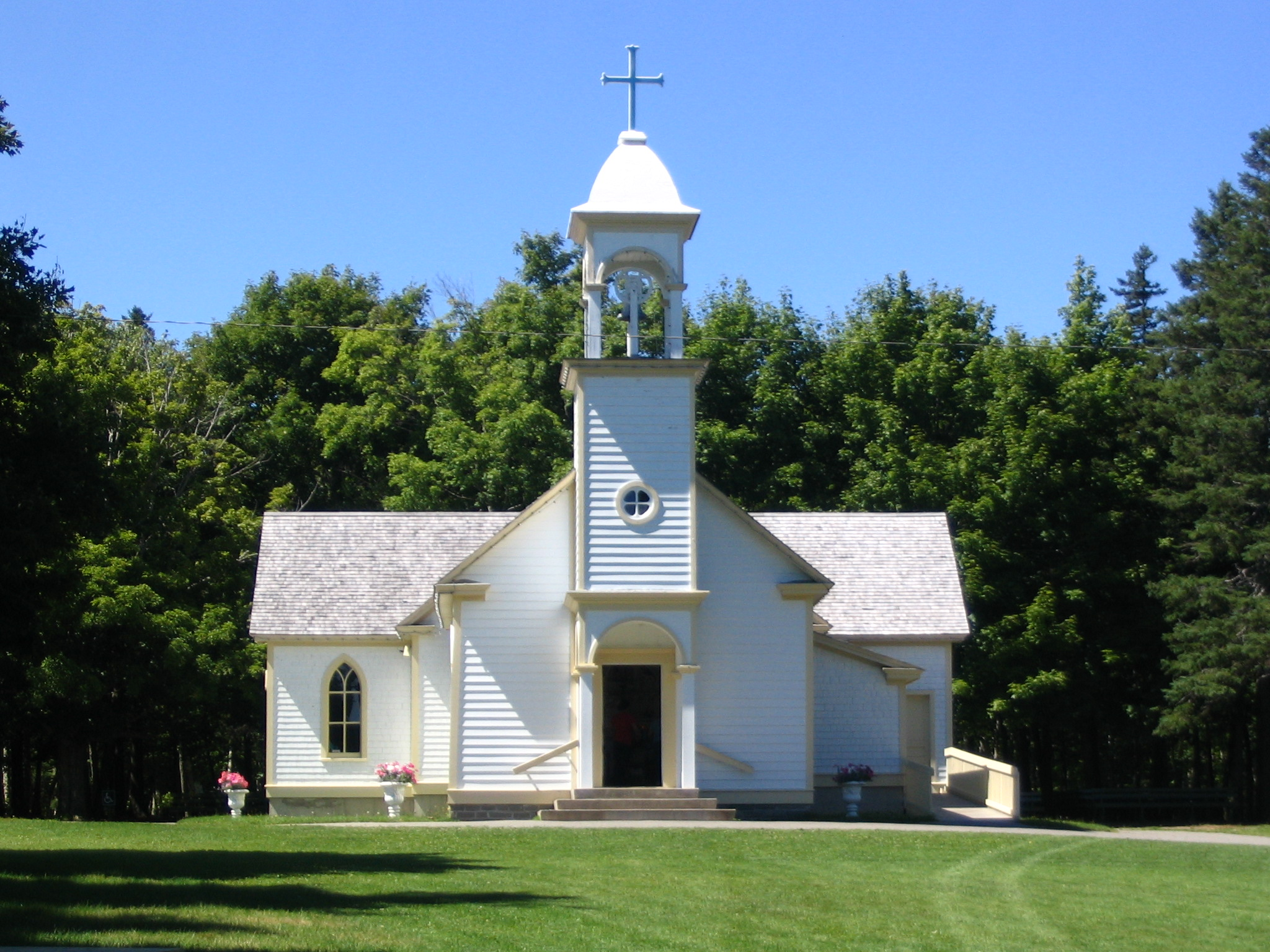
Façade of the chapel.

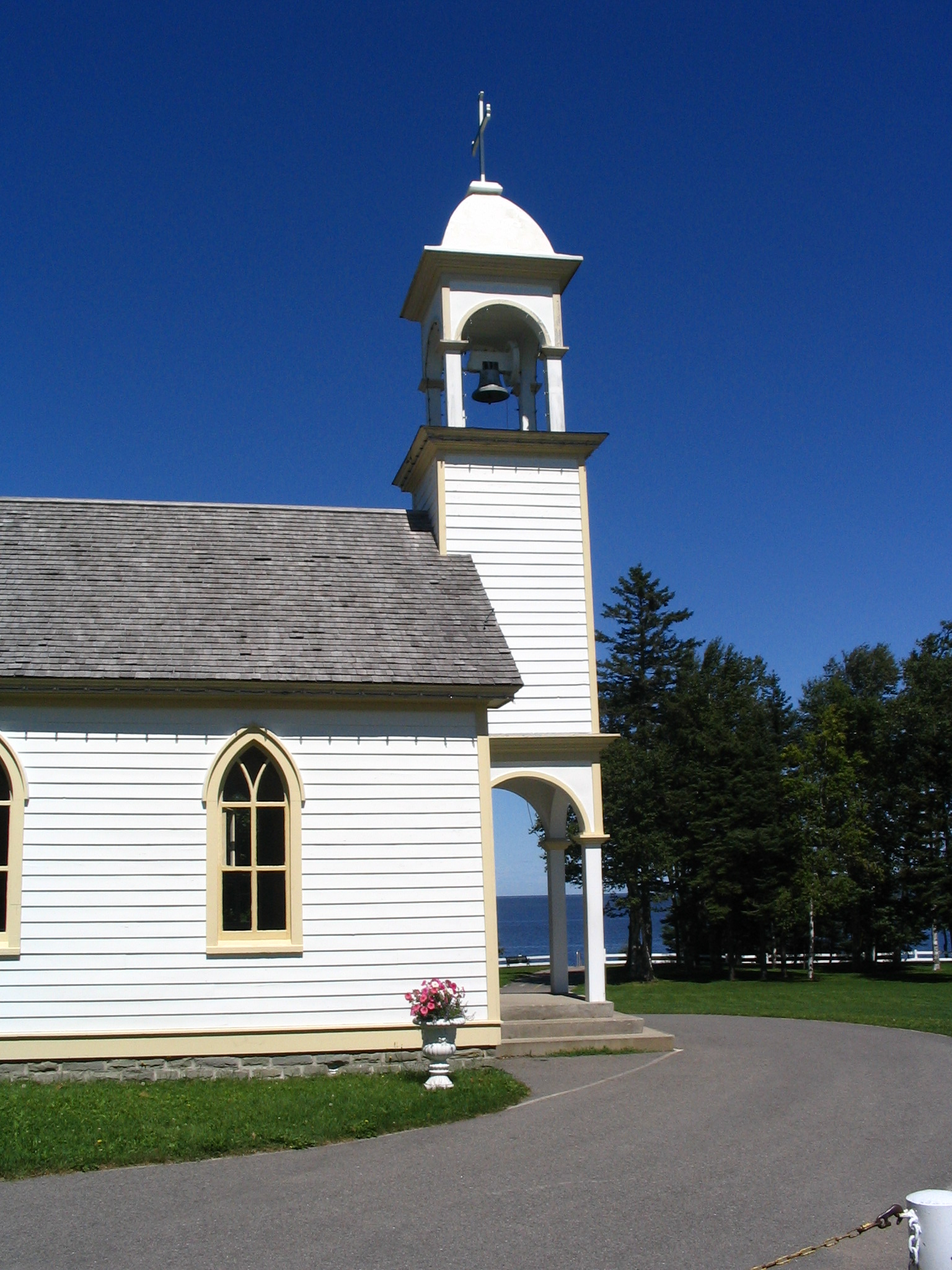
Details of the bell tower and windows.

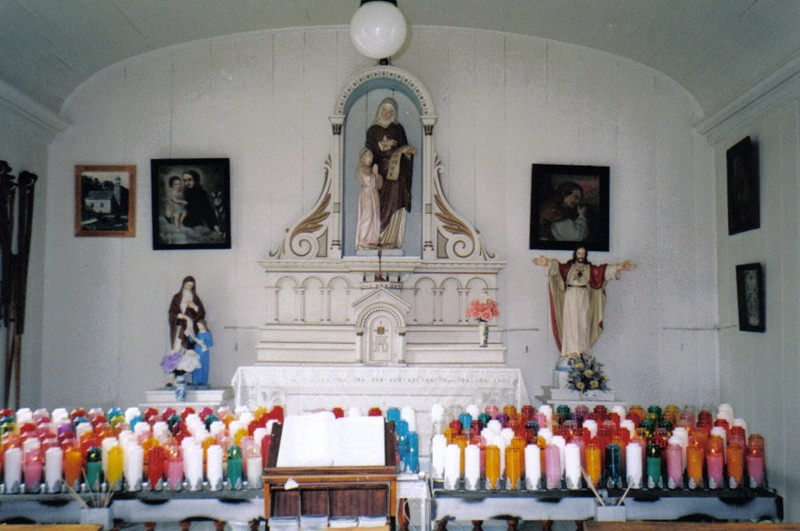
Altar in the closed chapel.

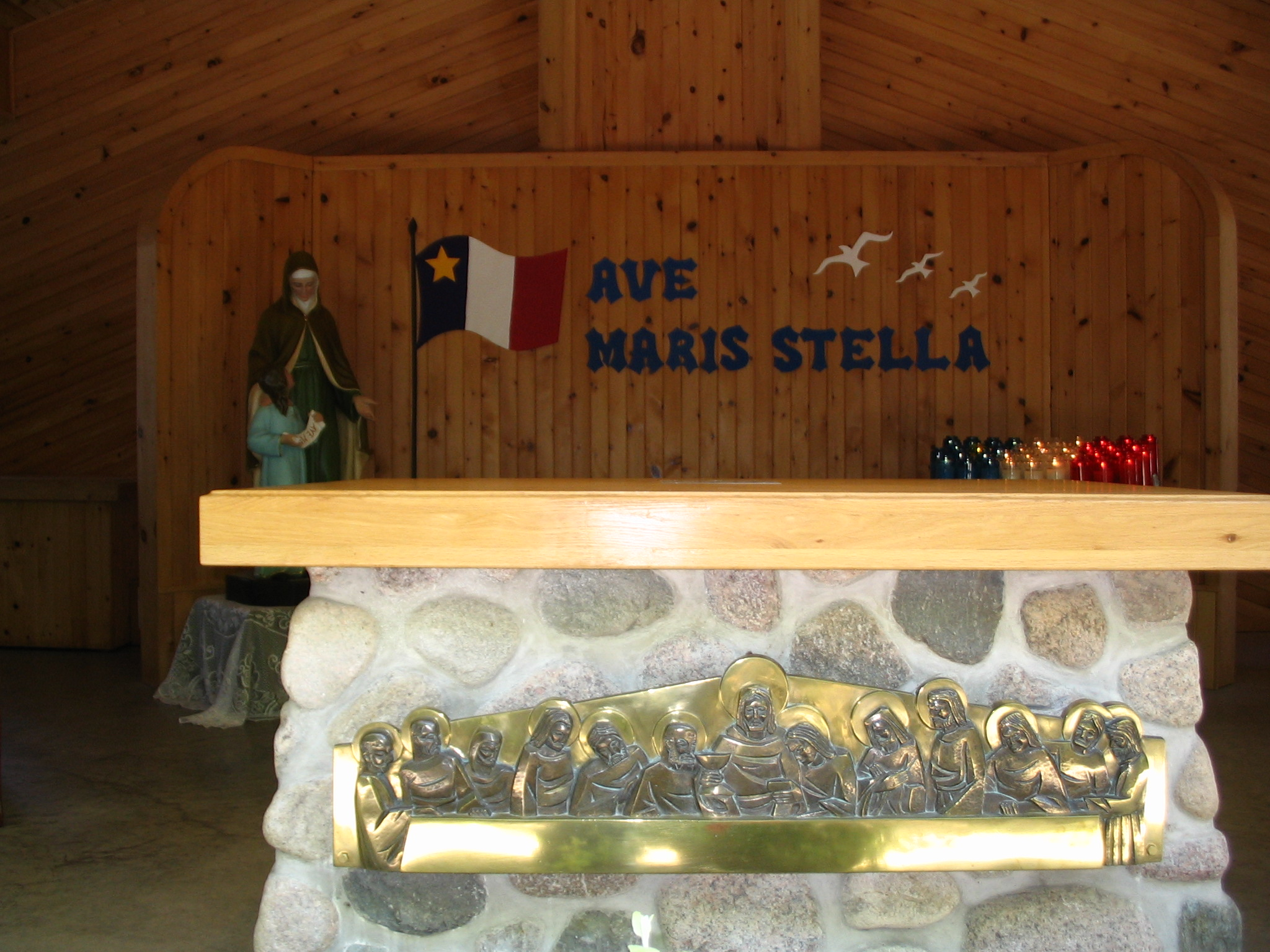
Altar in the open chapel.

=== Cemetery ===
More than 260 people are buried in the cemetery, but only a few headstones still remain. Many of these are the graves of the town's founders, including Alexis Landry and Louis Lanteigne. This cemetery is particularly important as it is one of the few known burial sites of survivors of the Acadian Deportation.

A monument over Alexis Landry's grave depicts him waving goodbye to his grandson Joseph-Marie in 1794. On the pedestal are three panels: the one on the left represents the Deportation of the Acadians, the one in the middle of the miraculous fishing, and the one on the right the arrival of the founders of Caraquet. A number of steles have been erected to honor the memory of other founders.

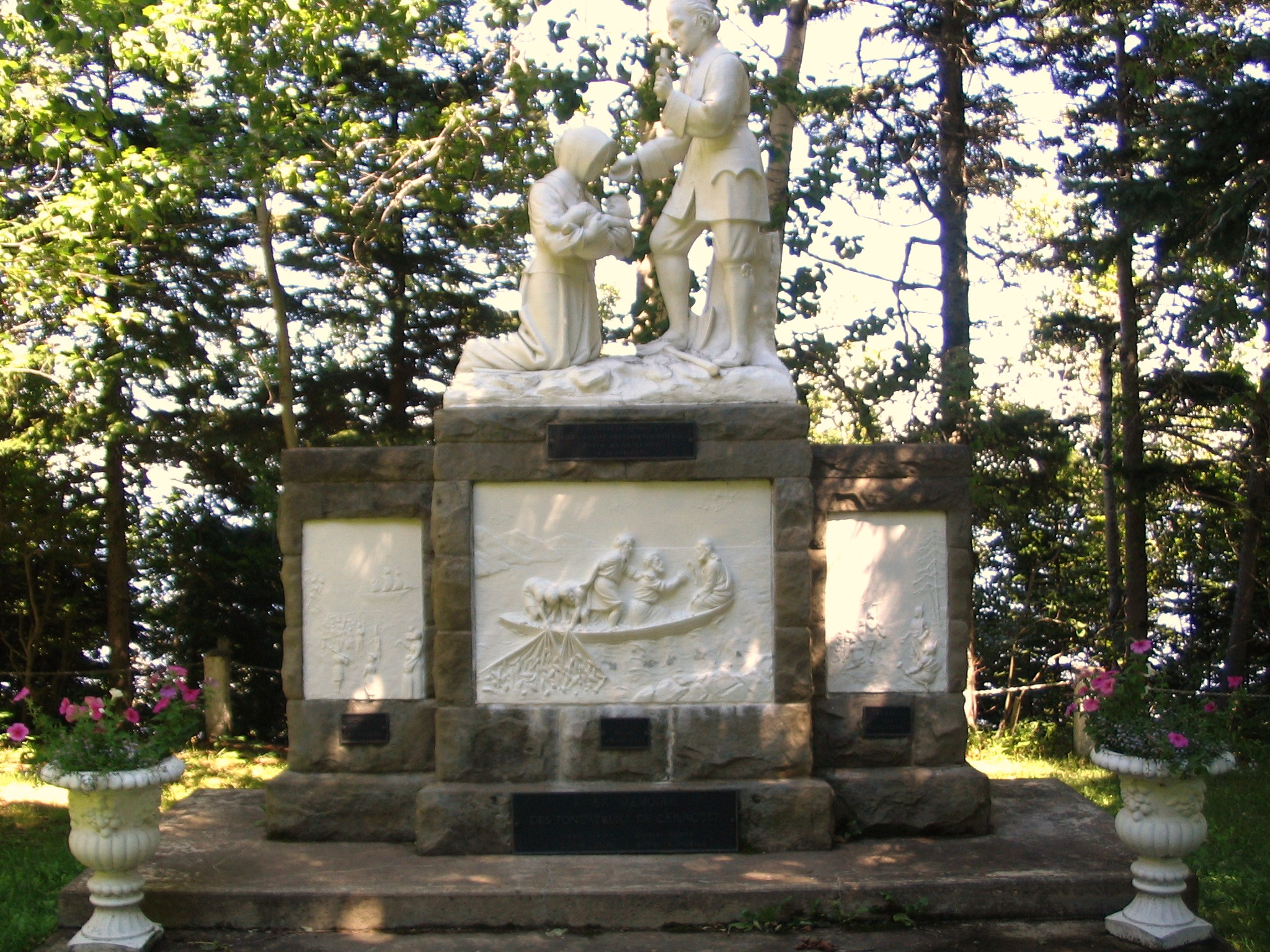
Memorial to Alexis Landry.

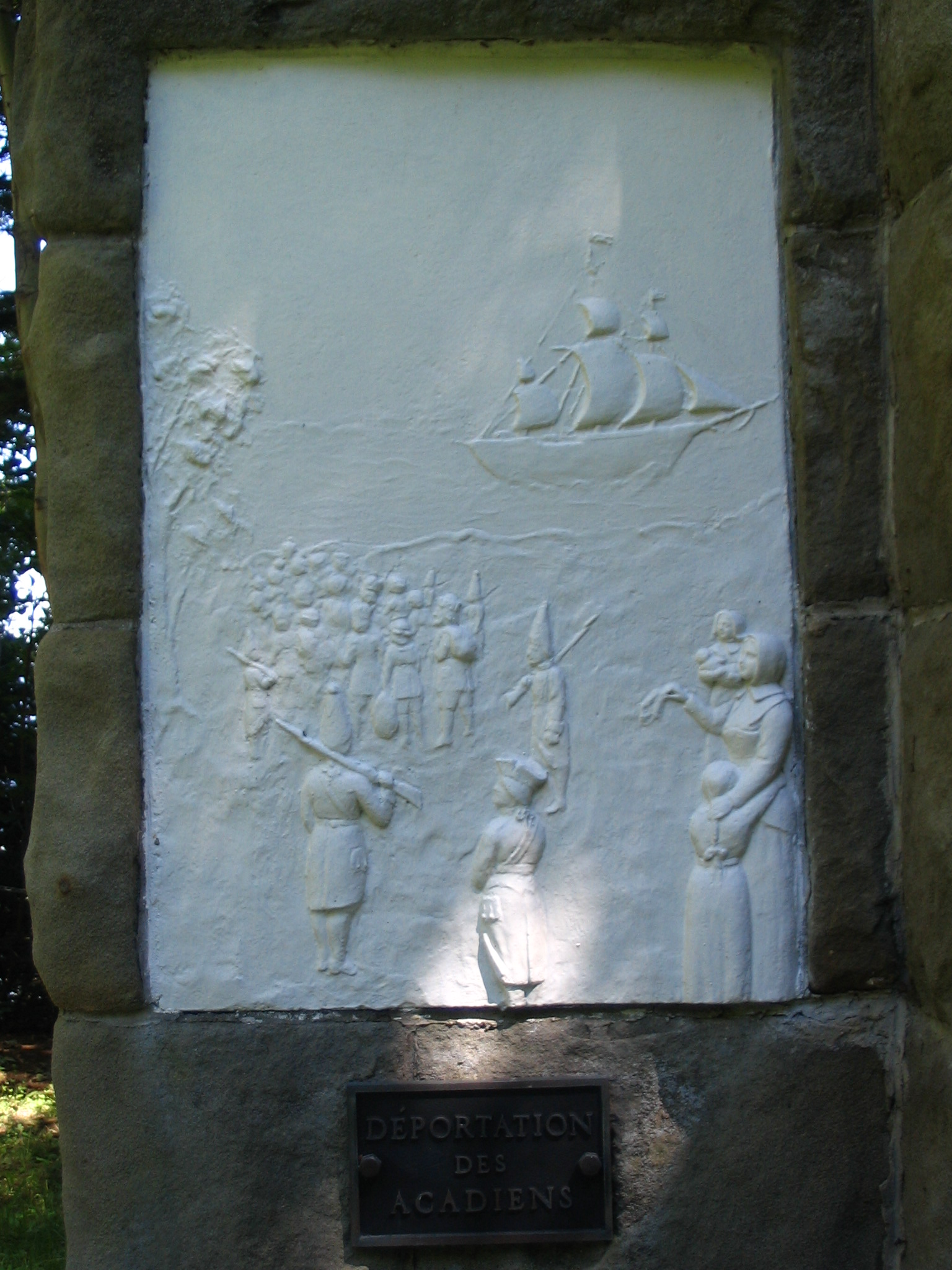
Details of the memorial.

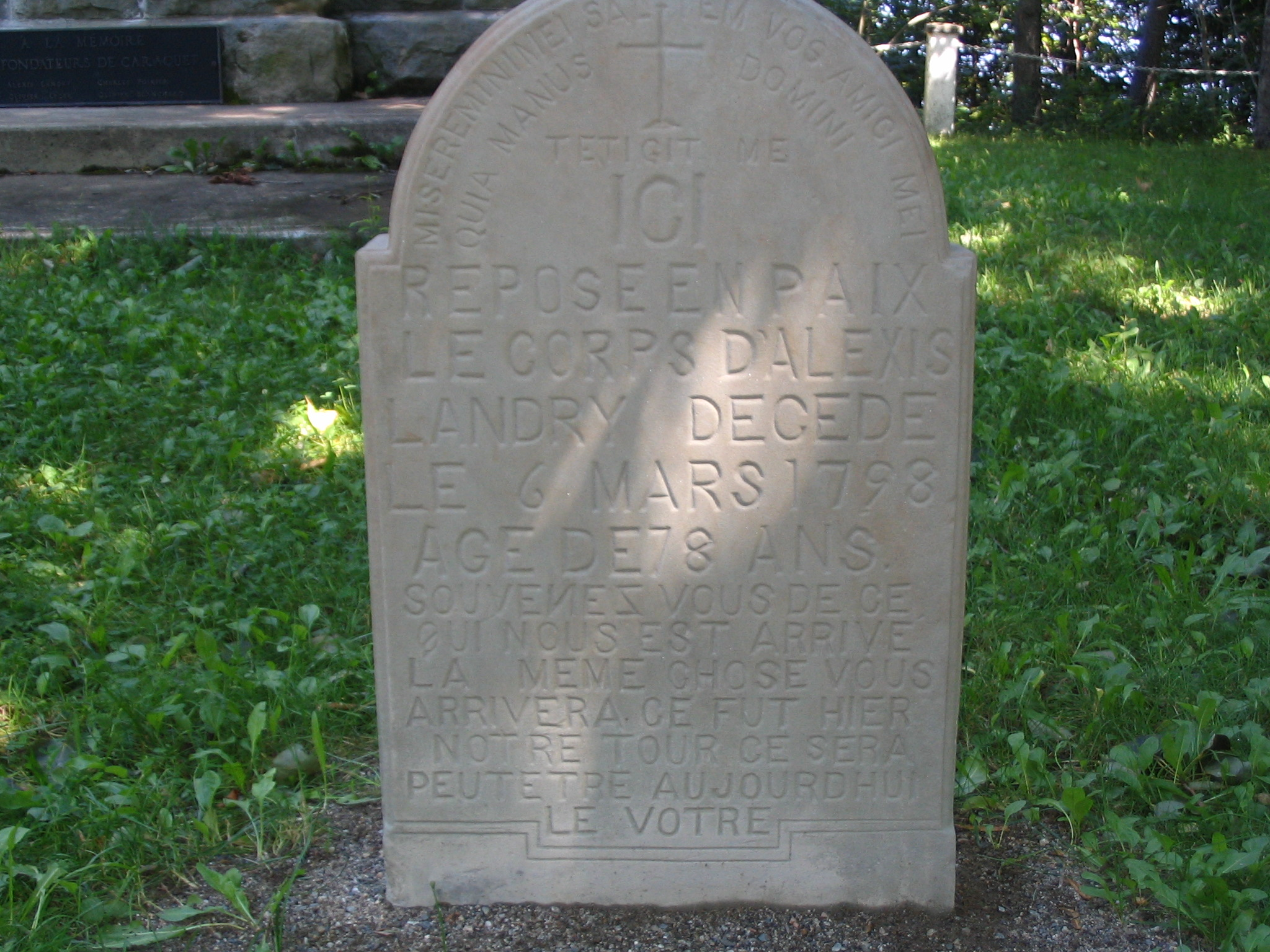
Alexis Landry's grave.

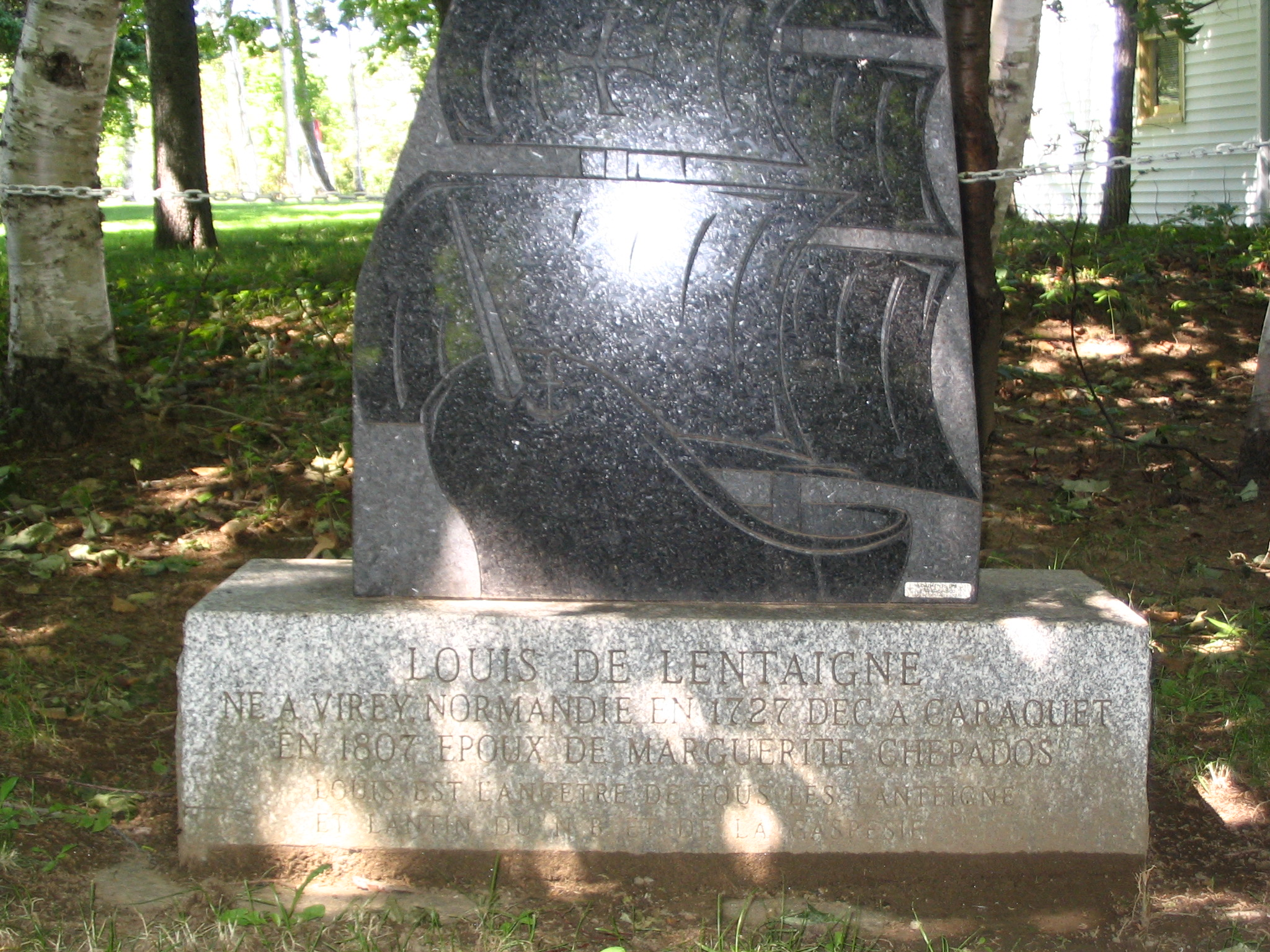
Louis de Lanteigne's tomb.

=== Other buildings ===
To the south of the chapel is the L'odyssée acadienne monument. This group of monuments was installed by the Société Nationale de l'Acadie at various sites around the world linked to the Great Upheaval. The monuments stand on a star-shaped base. On the four sides are two inscriptions, displayed in English and French. One summarises this period of Acadian history, and the other summarises events specific to the place where the monument is installed. A map, using part of the map Acadia: A People's Odyssey (fr), appears at the top of the base. The monument ends with a replica of the Grand-Pré Deportation Cross. There are ruins near the car park, on which a commemorative plaque has been placed:

To the north of the chapel, a fifty-meter path leads up to a staircase onto a terrace on the shore of Caraquet Bay. A fountain is located here, topped by a stone grotto containing a statue once again depicting Sainte Anne and the Virgin Mary. The water from this source is considered miraculous by some, and many people come to drink or even bottle it. In the bay near the terrace there are giant prayer beading made up of buoys. To the south of the chapel there is also a well and a manual water pump.

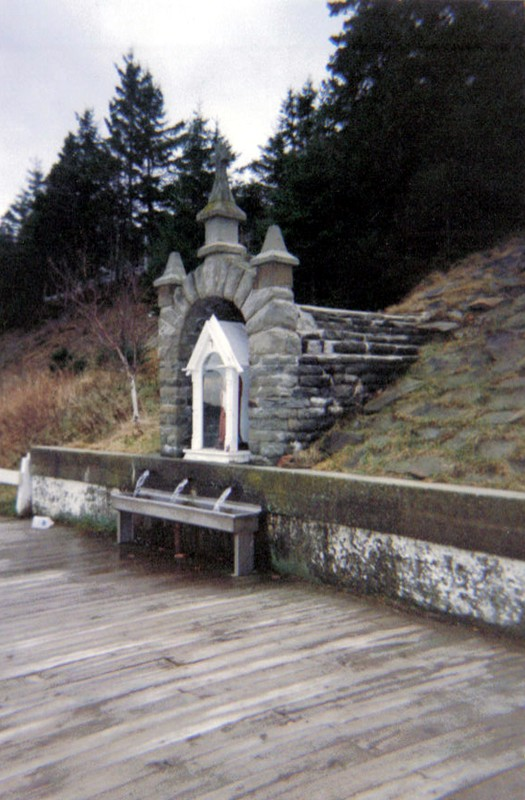
The fountain.

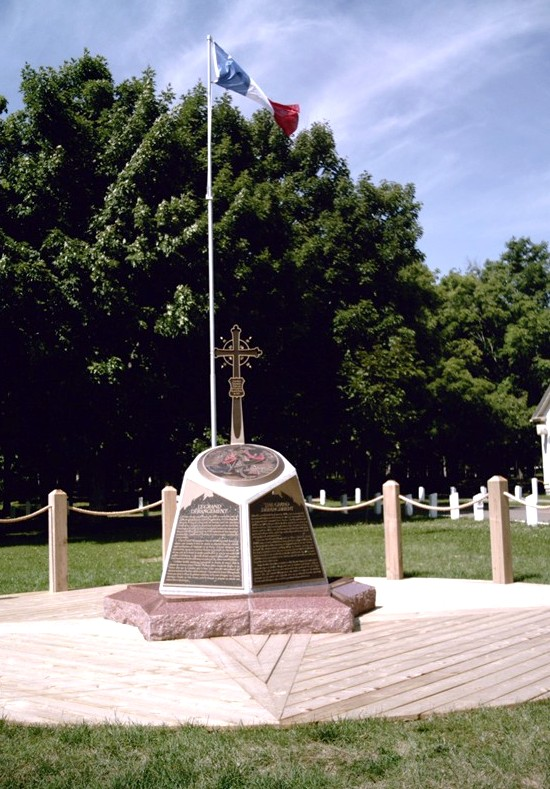
Monument to the Acadian Deportation.

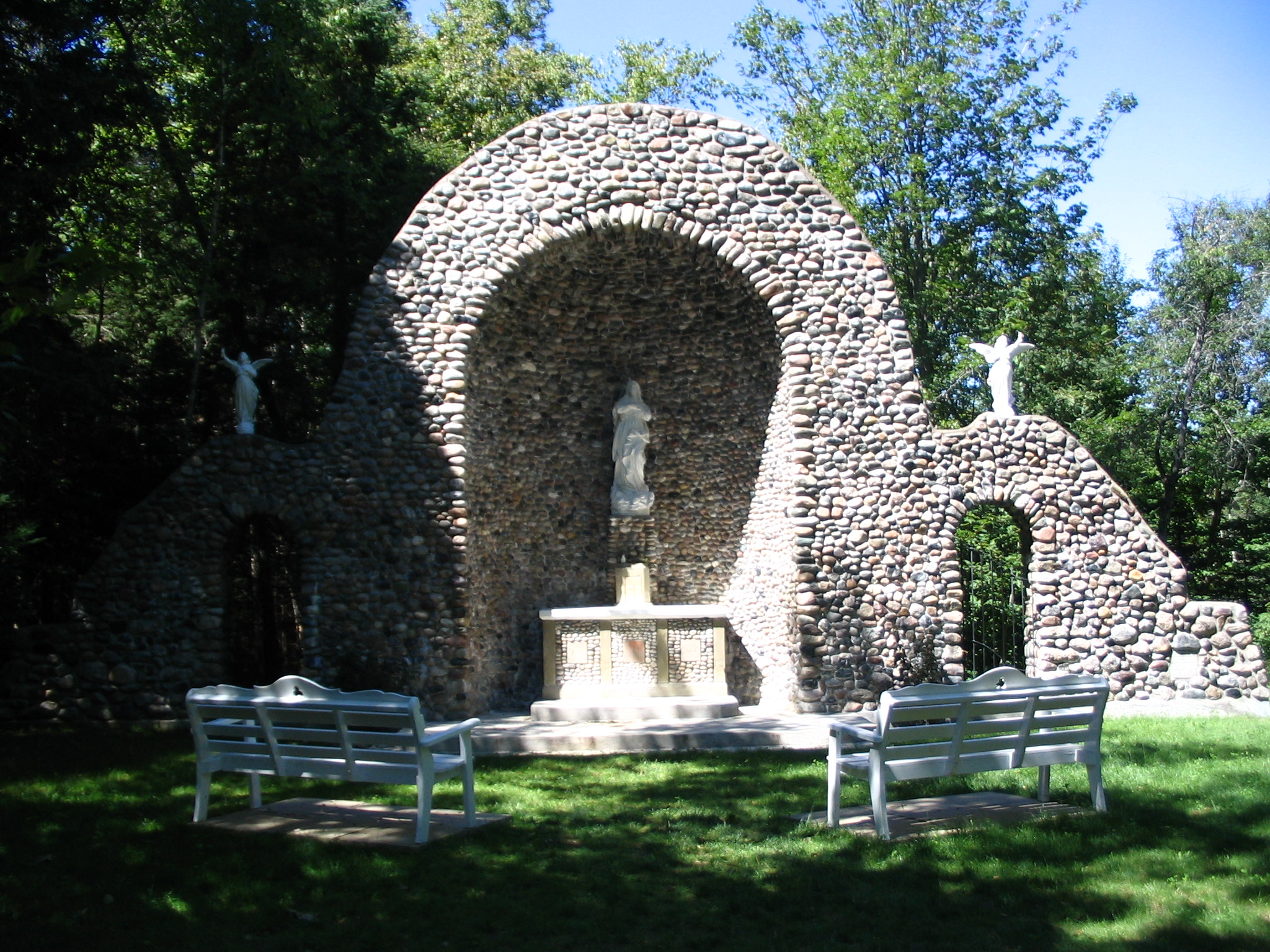
Monument to Notre-Dame de l'Assomption.

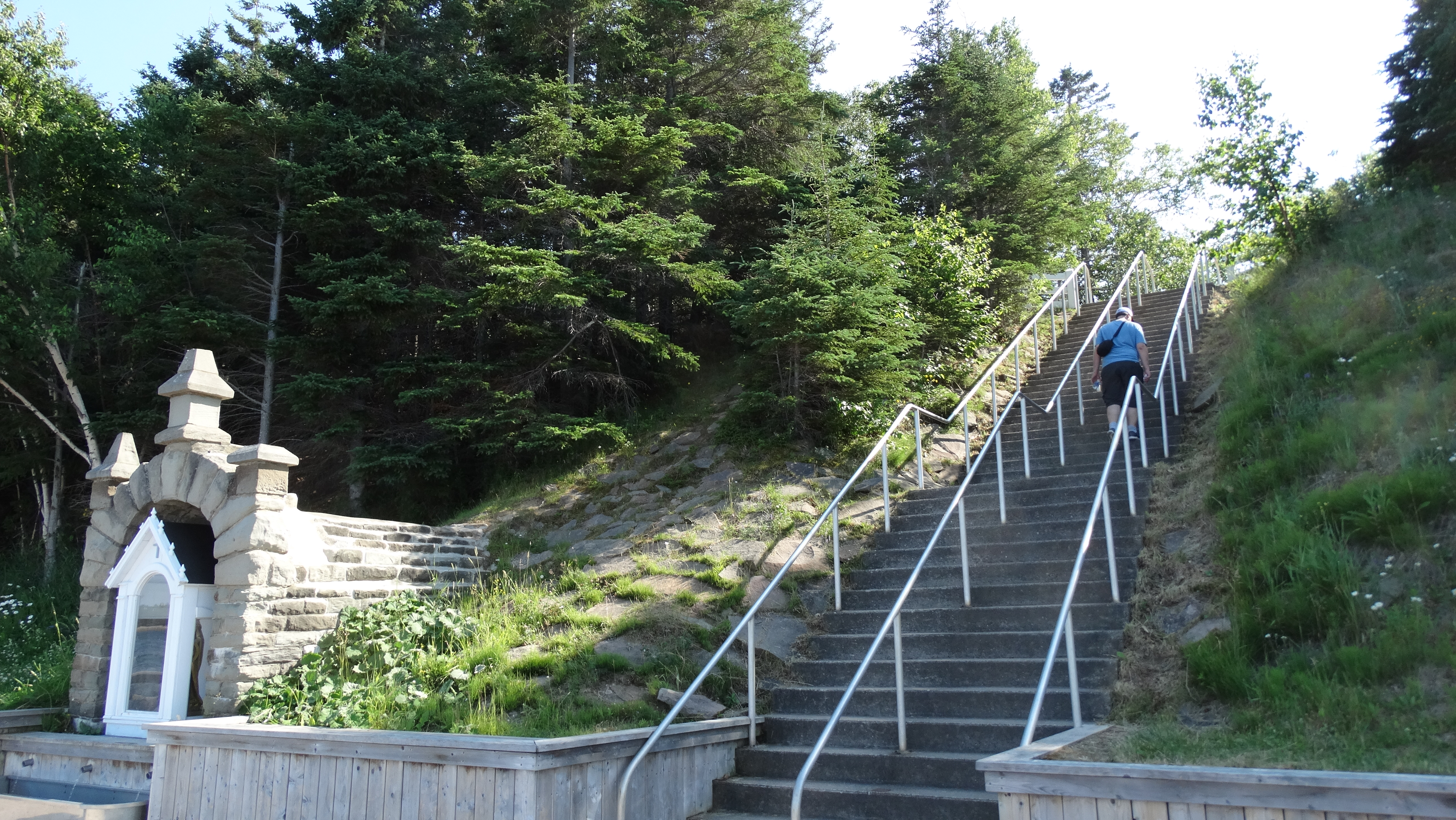
Stairs near the water fountain.

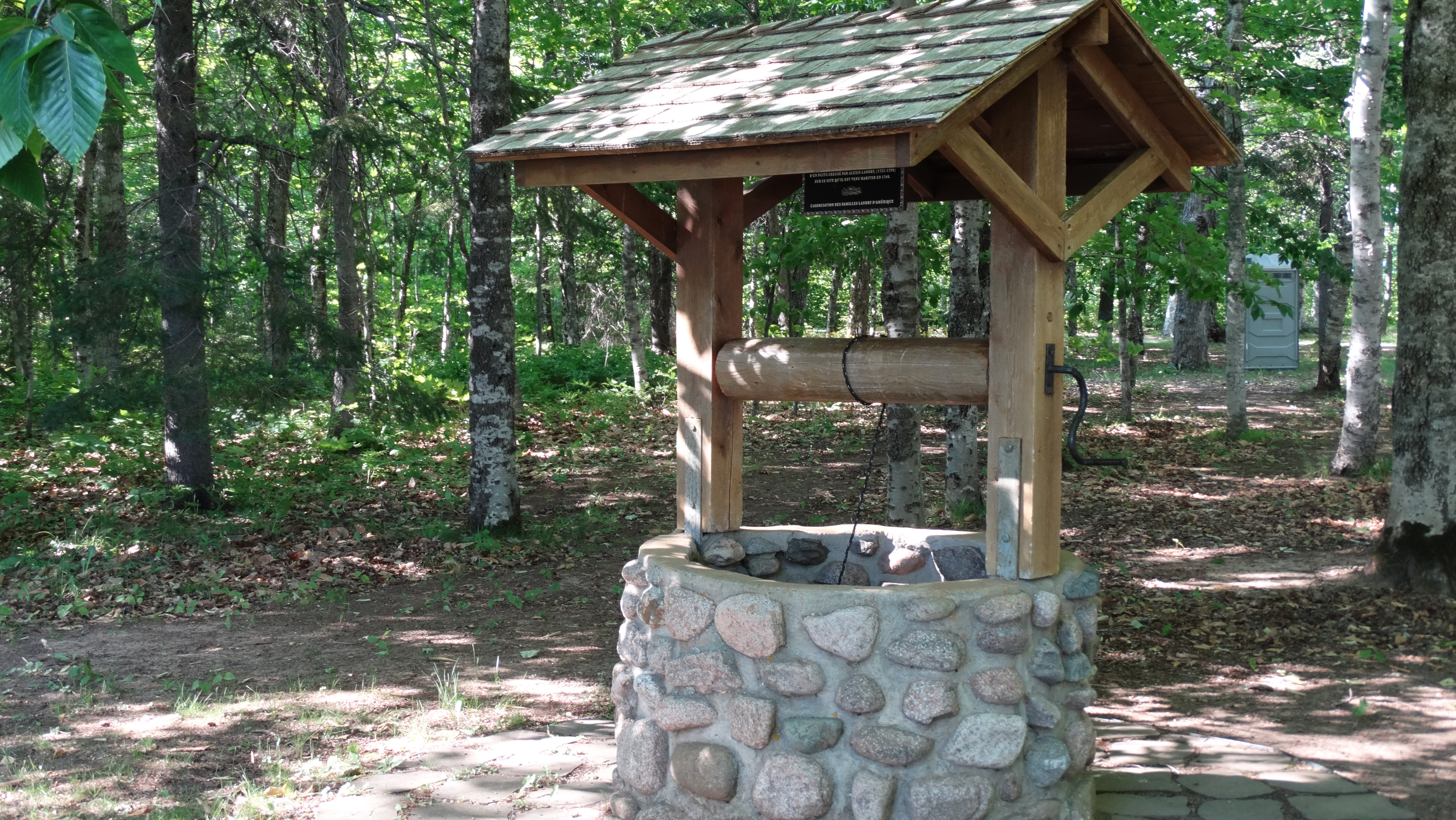
A well

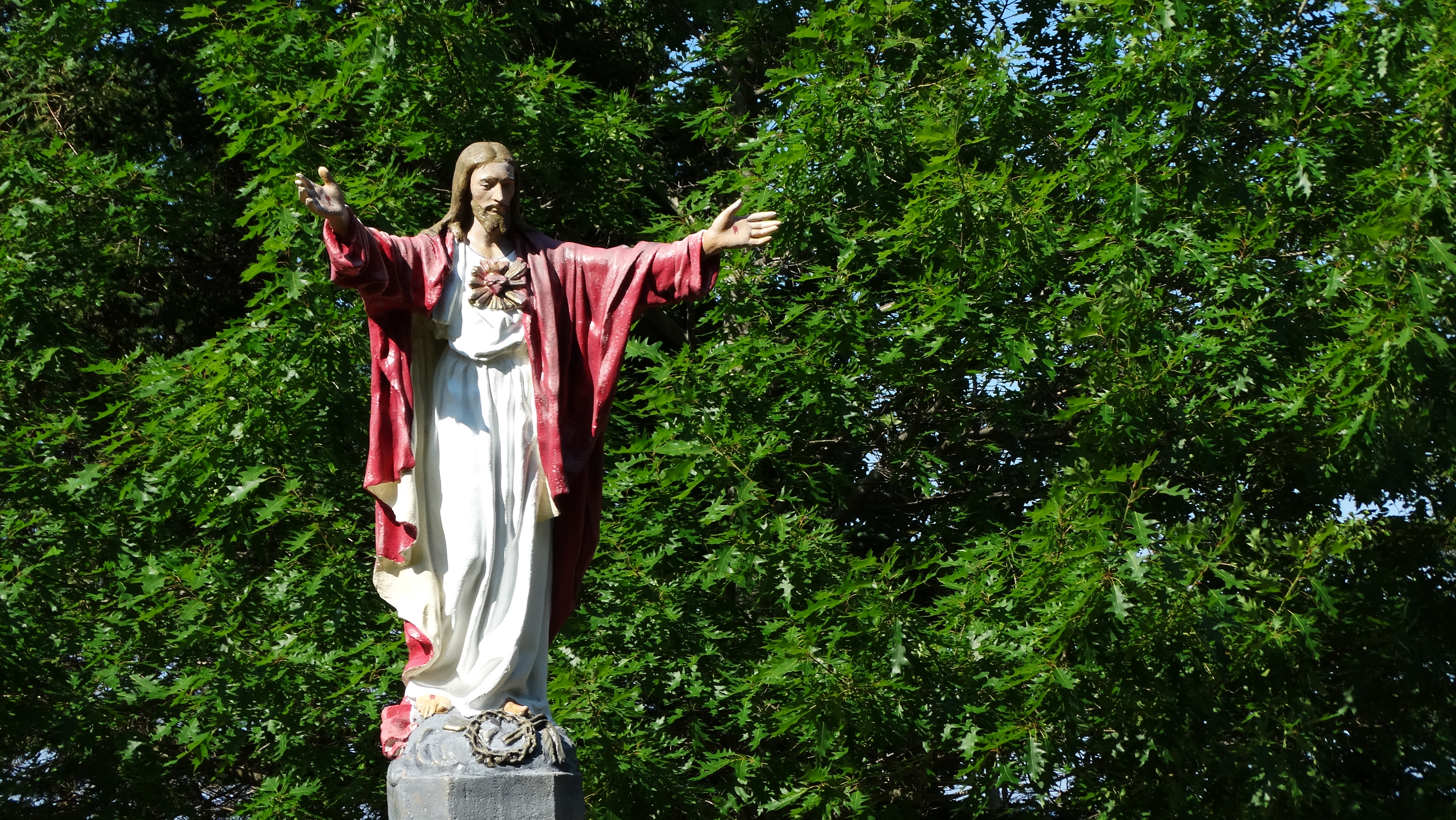
A statue of Jesus of Nazareth at Sainte-Anne-du-Bocage.

=== Celebrations ===
The park is used for various festivities during the summer. These begin on June 15 with the daily Lauds prayer in the historic chapel. The Saint Anne novena begins on July 17. On the night of July 25 to 26, a pilgrimage is held from the church of Saint-Michel Archange in Inkerman to Sainte-Anne-du-Bocage, a distance of more than 25 kilometers. Several thousand people attend the feast of Sainte-Anne, known locally as the "Bonne Sainte-Anne", which takes place on July 26 and brings the novena to a close. Many sick and disabled people attend this mass in the hope of being cured. The sanctuary is also the site of an annual mass on August 15, the National Acadian Day and of Notre-Dame-de-l'Assomption, the patron saint of Acadia.

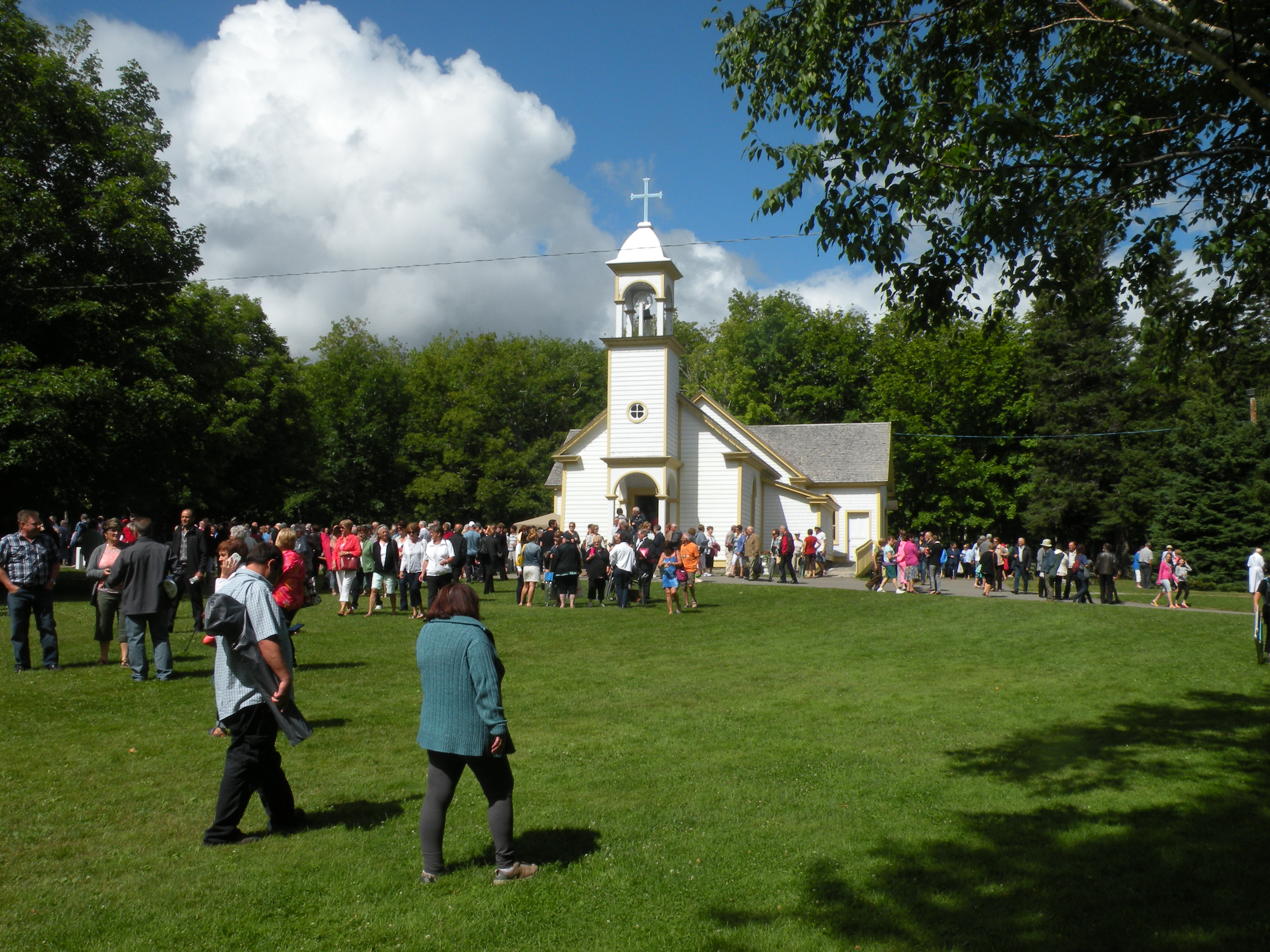
Crowds at the "Bonne Sainte-Anne".

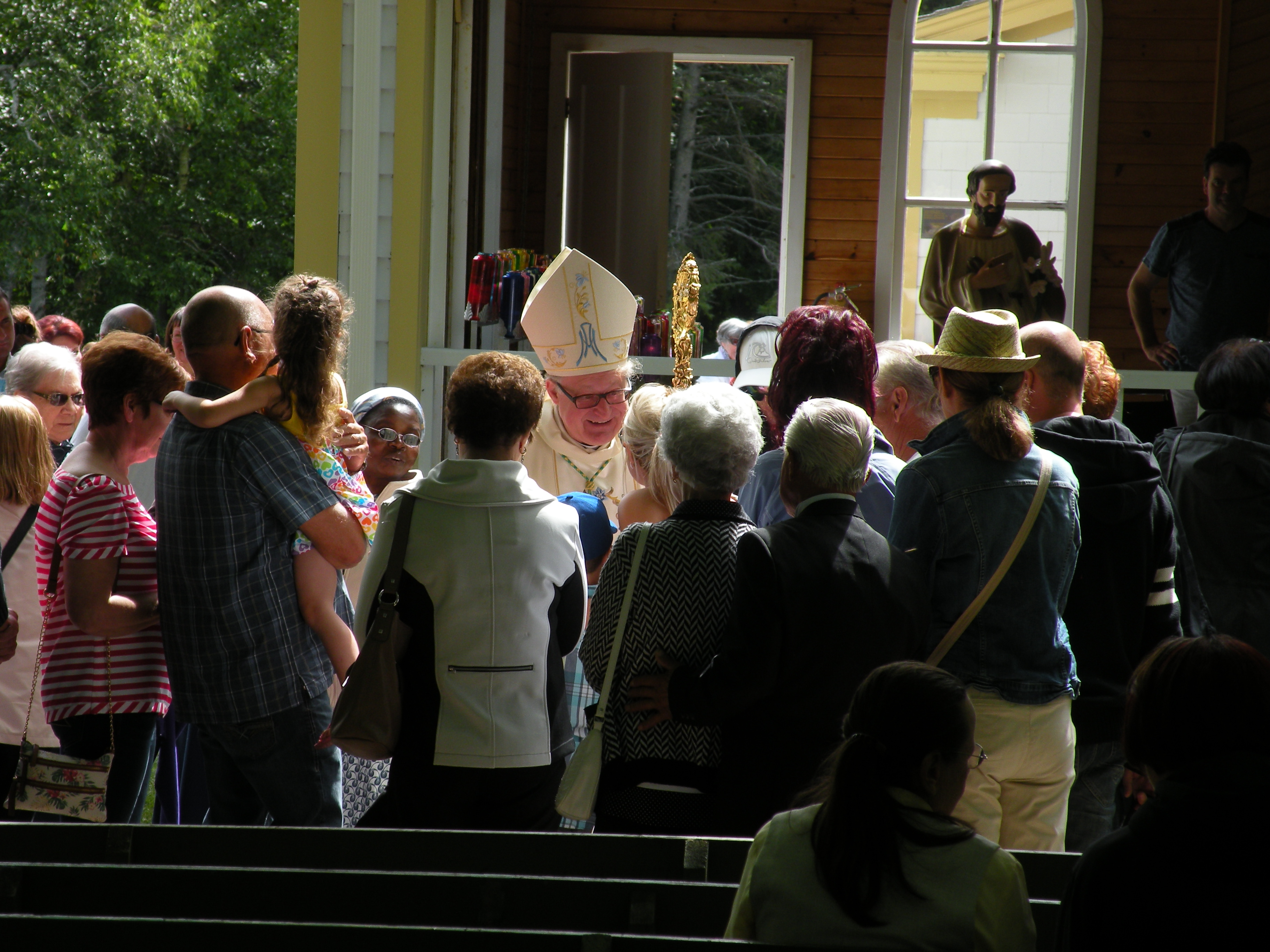
A priest talking to people after mass.

== Others ==
Sainte-Anne-du-Bocage is also the name of the district in which the sanctuary is located. The district is named after the chapel. A traditional dance is known as the quadrille de Sainte-Anne-du-Bocage.

== See also ==
=== Related articles ===
- Alexis Landry
- Olivier Blanchard
- fr:Haut-Caraquet
- fr:Patrimoine architectural et monuments de Caraquet
- fr:Chapelle Sainte-Anne (Beaumont)
- Chapel of Sainte-Anne de Beaumont

=== Bibliography ===
- Denise Lamontagne, Le culte à Sainte-Anne en Acadie, Québec, Presses de l'Université Laval, 2011 ISBN 978-2-7637-9323-8
- Corrine Albert-Blanchard, Caraquet : quelques bribes de son histoire, Comité du centenaire de Caraquet, Caraquet, 1967.
- J. Antonin Friolet, Caraquet, village au soleil, Fredericton, 1978.
- Clarence LeBreton and Bernard Thériault, Caraquet, 1961–1981: du plus long village du monde à la plus longue rue des Maritimes, Caraquet, 1981.
- William Francis Ganong, The history of Caraquet and Pokemouche, New Brunswick Museum, Saint John, 1948.

=== External links ===
- Official website archive
