= Acadia =

Colony in north-eastern North America

Colony of Acadia Acadie (French)
- Division of New France
- 1604–1713
- Flag (Note: The Royal Banner of early modern France or "Bourbon Flag" was the most commonly used flag in New France)

- Acadia (1754)
- Approximate map of the most commonly accepted definition of Acadia
- Capital: Undetermined; Port-Royal (de facto)
- Demonym: Acadian
- Area
  - Coordinates: 47°39′55″N 65°45′15″W
- Population
  - 1714: 2,500
- History
  - Established: 1604
  - British conquest: 1713
Preceded by
Canada (New France)
Succeeded by
Province of Quebec (1763–1791)
Nova Scotia
Prince Edward Island
New Brunswick
Province of Massachusetts Bay

Acadia (/əˈkeɪdiə/; French: Acadie) was a colony of New France in northeastern North America which included parts of what are now the Maritime provinces, the Gaspé Peninsula and Maine to the Kennebec River, an area also known as the Maritime Peninsula. Settlers primarily came from the southwestern regions of France, including Poitou-Charentes and the Aquitaine region (now known as Nouvelle-Aquitaine), as well as Poitou and Anjou. The territory was inhabited by various First Nations of the Wabanaki Confederacy who referred to the region as Dawnland.

The first capital of Acadia was established in 1605 as Port-Royal. Soon after, English forces of Captain Argall, an English ship's captain employed by the Virginia Company of London attacked and burned down the fortified habitation in 1613. A new centre for Port-Royal was established nearby, and it remained the longest-serving capital of French Acadia until the British siege of Port Royal in 1710. (Note: For the 144 years prior to the founding of Halifax (1749), Port Royal (or Annapolis Royal) was the capital of Acadia for 112 of those years. The other locations that served as the capital of Acadia are: LaHave, Nova Scotia (1632–1636 ), Castine, Maine (1670–1674), Beaubassin (1678–1684), Jemseg, New Brunswick (1690–1691), Fredericton, New Brunswick (1691–1694), and Saint John, New Brunswick (1695–1699).) There were six colonial wars in a 74-year period in which British interests tried to capture Acadia, starting with King William's War in 1689.

French troops from Quebec, Acadians, the Wabanaki Confederacy, and French priests continually raided New England settlements along the border in Maine during these wars. Acadia was conquered in 1710 during Queen Anne's War, while New Brunswick and much of Maine remained contested territory. Prince Edward Island (Île Saint-Jean) and Cape Breton (Île Royale) remained under French control, as agreed under Article XIII of the Treaty of Utrecht. The English took control of Maine by defeating the Wabanaki Confederacy and the French priests during Father Rale's War. During King George's War, France and New France made significant attempts to regain mainland Nova Scotia. The British took New Brunswick in Father Le Loutre's War, and they took Île Royale and Île Saint-Jean in 1758 following the French and Indian War. The territory was eventually divided into British colonies.

The term Acadia today refers to regions of North America that are historically associated with the lands, descendants, or culture of the former region. It particularly refers to regions of the Maritimes with Acadian roots, language, and culture, primarily in New Brunswick, Nova Scotia, the Magdalen Islands and Prince Edward Island, as well as in Maine. "Acadia" can also refer to the Acadian diaspora in southern Louisiana, a region also referred to as Acadiana since the early 1960s. In the abstract, Acadia refers to the existence of an Acadian culture in any of these regions. People living in Acadia are called Acadians, which in Louisiana changed to Cajuns, the more common, rural American, name of Acadians.

== Etymology ==
Explorer Giovanni da Verrazzano is credited for originating the designation Acadia on his 16th-century map, where he applied the ancient Greek name "Arcadia" to the entire Atlantic coast north of Virginia. "Arcadia" is derived from the Arcadia region in Greece, which had the extended meanings of "refuge" or "idyllic place". Henry IV of France chartered a colony south of the St. Lawrence River between the 40th and 46th parallels in 1603, and he recognized it as La Cadie. Samuel de Champlain fixed its present orthography with the r omitted, and cartographer William Francis Ganong has shown its gradual progress northeastwards to its resting place in the Atlantic provinces of Canada.

As an alternative theory, some historians suggest that the name is derived from the indigenous Canadian Mi'kmaw language, in which cadie means "fertile land". As a suffix, -cadie (-katik in modern Mi'kmaq orthography) is common in Mi'kmaq placenames indicating land or a territory.

== History ==
=== 17th century ===
The history of Acadia was significantly influenced by the great power conflict between France and England, later Great Britain, that occurred in the 17th and 18th centuries. Prior to the arrival of Europeans, the Mi'kmaq had been living in Acadia for at least two to three thousand years. Early European settlers were French subjects primarily from the Poitou-Charentes and Aquitaine regions of southwestern France, now known as Nouvelle-Aquitaine. The first French settlement was established by Pierre Dugua de Mons, Governor of Acadia, under the authority of the French King, Henri IV, on Saint Croix Island in 1604. The following year, the settlement was moved across the Bay of Fundy to Port Royal after a difficult winter on the island and deaths from scurvy. There, they constructed a new habitation. In 1607, the colony received bad news as Henri IV revoked Sieur de Mons' royal fur monopoly, citing that the income was insufficient to justify supplying the colony further. Thus recalled, the last of the French left Port Royal in August 1607. Their allies, the Mi'kmaq, agreed to act as custodians of the settlement. When the former lieutenant governor, Jean de Biencourt de Poutrincourt et de Saint-Just, returned in 1610, he found the Port Royal habitation just as it was left.

During the first 80 years of the French presence in Acadia, there were numerous significant battles as the English, Scottish, and Dutch contested the French for possession of the colony. These battles happened at Port Royal, Saint John, (Note: Until 1784, New Brunswick was part of Nova Scotia.) Cap de Sable (present-day Port La Tour, Nova Scotia), Jemseg, Castine, and Baleine.

From the 1680s onward, there were six colonial wars that took place in the region (see the French and Indian Wars as well as Father Rale's War and Father Le Loutre's War). These wars were fought between New England and New France, and their respective native allies. After the British siege of Port Royal in 1710, mainland Nova Scotia was under the control of British colonial government, but both present-day New Brunswick and virtually all of present-day Maine remained contested territory between New England and New France, until the Treaty of Paris of 1763 confirmed British control over the region.

The wars were fought on two fronts: the southern border of Acadia, which New France defined as the Kennebec River in southern Maine and in present-day peninsular Nova Scotia. The latter involved preventing the British from taking the capital of Acadia, Port Royal (See Queen Anne's War), establishing themselves at Canso (See Father Rale's War) and founding Halifax (see Father Le Loutre's War).

==== Acadian Civil War ====
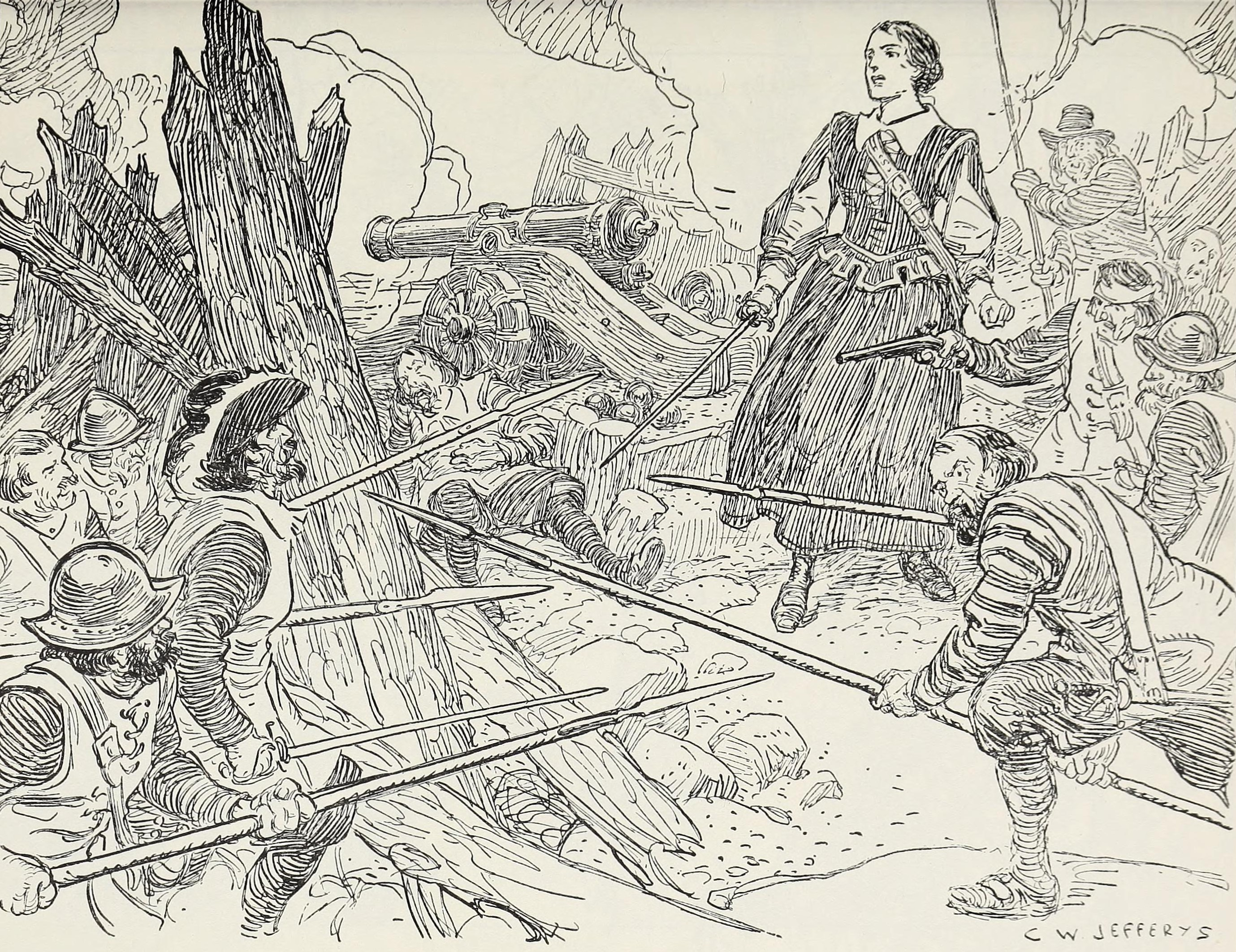
Siege of Saint John (1645) – d'Aulnay defeats La Tour in Acadia

From 1640 to 1645, Acadia was plunged into what some historians have described as a civil war. The war was between Port Royal, where the Governor of Acadia Charles de Menou d'Aulnay de Charnisay was stationed, and present-day Saint John, New Brunswick, where Governor of Acadia Charles de Saint-Étienne de la Tour was stationed. There were four major battles in the war, and d'Aulnay ultimately prevailed over La Tour.

==== King Philip's War ====
During King Philip's War (1675–78), the governor was absent from Acadia (having first been imprisoned in Boston during the Dutch occupation of Acadia) and Jean-Vincent d'Abbadie de Saint-Castin was established at the capital of Acadia, Pentagouêt. From there he worked with the Abenaki of Acadia to raid British settlements migrating over the border of Acadia. British retaliation included attacking deep into Acadia in the Battle of Port La Tour (1677).

==== Wabanaki Confederacy ====
In response to King Philip's War in New England, the native peoples in Acadia joined the Wabanaki Confederacy to form a political and military alliance with New France. The Confederacy remained significant military allies to New France through six wars. Until the French and Indian War the Wabanaki Confederacy remained the dominant military force in the region.

==== Catholic missions ====
There were tensions on the border between New England and Acadia, which New France defined as the Kennebec River in southern Maine. English settlers from Massachusetts (whose charter included the Maine area) had expanded their settlements into Acadia. To secure New France's claim to Acadia, it established Catholic missions (churches) among the four largest native villages in the region: one on the Kennebec River (Norridgewock); one further north on the Penobscot River (Penobscot); one on the Saint John River (Medoctec); and one at Shubenacadie (Saint Anne's Mission).

==== King William's War ====
During King William's War (1688–97), some Acadians, the Wabanaki Confederacy and the French Priests participated in defending Acadia at its border with New England, which New France defined as the Kennebec River in southern Maine. Toward this end, the members of the Wabanaki Confederacy, on the Saint John River and in other places, joined the New France expedition against present-day Bristol, Maine (the siege of Pemaquid (1689)), Salmon Falls and present-day Portland, Maine.

In response, the New Englanders retaliated by attacking Port Royal and present-day Guysborough. Acadia was notionally integrated into the newly formed Province of Massachusetts Bay in 1691, along with bordering areas now part of Maine.

In 1694, the Wabanaki Confederacy participated in the Raid on Oyster River at present-day Durham, New Hampshire. Two years later, New France, led by Pierre Le Moyne d'Iberville, returned and fought a naval battle in the Bay of Fundy before moving on to raid Bristol, Maine, again. In retaliation, the New Englanders, led by Benjamin Church, engaged in a Raid on Chignecto (1696) and the siege of the Capital of Acadia at Fort Nashwaak.

At the end of the war in 1697, England returned the territory to France in the Treaty of Ryswick and the borders of Acadia remained the same.

=== 18th century ===
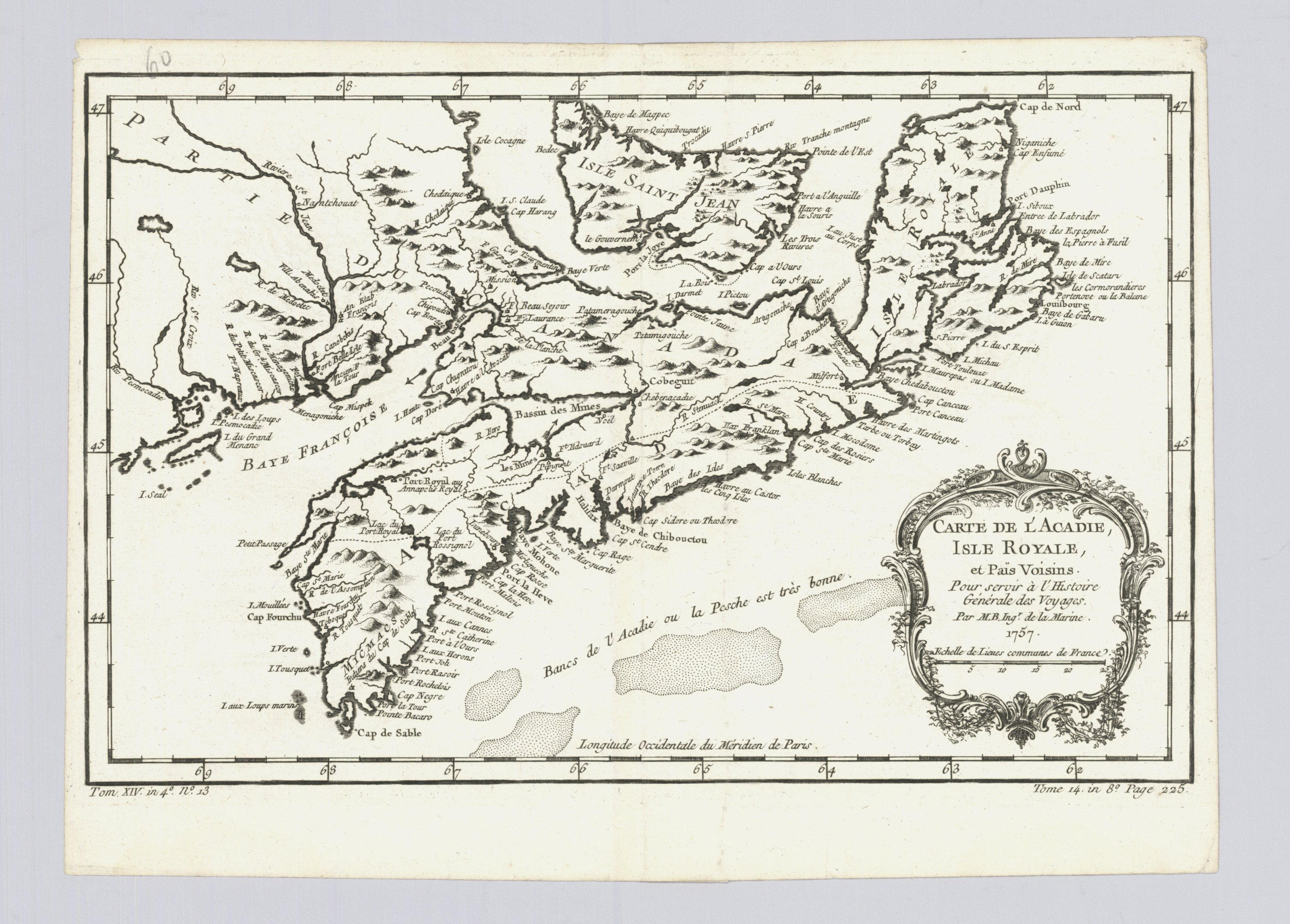
Acadia in 1757

==== Queen Anne's War ====
During Queen Anne's War, some Acadians, the Wabanaki Confederacy and the French priests participated again in defending Acadia at its border with New England. They made numerous raids on New England settlements along the border in the Northeast Coast Campaign and the famous Raid on Deerfield. In retaliation, Major Benjamin Church went on his fifth and final expedition to Acadia. He raided present-day Castine, Maine and continued with raids against Grand Pre, Pisiquid, and Chignecto. A few years later, defeated in the siege of Pemaquid (1696), Captain March made an unsuccessful siege on the Capital of Acadia, Port Royal (1707). British forces were successful with the siege of Port Royal (1710), while the Wabanaki Confederacy were successful in the nearby Battle of Bloody Creek (1711) and continued raids along the Maine frontier.

The 1710 conquest of the Acadian capital of Port Royal during the war was confirmed by the Treaty of Utrecht of 1713. The British conceded to the French "the island called Cape Breton, as also all others, both in the mouth of the river of St. Lawrence, and in the gulph of the same name", and "all manner of liberty to fortify any place or places there." The French established a fortress at Louisbourg, Cape Breton, to guard the sea approaches to Quebec.

On 23 June 1713, the French residents of Nova Scotia were given one year to declare allegiance to Britain or leave the region. In the meantime, the French signalled their preparedness for future hostilities by beginning the construction of Fortress Louisbourg on Île Royale, now Cape Breton Island. The British grew increasingly alarmed by the prospect of disloyalty in wartime of the Acadians now under their rule. French missionaries worked to maintain the loyalty of Acadians, and to maintain a hold on the mainland part of Acadia.

==== Dummer's War ====
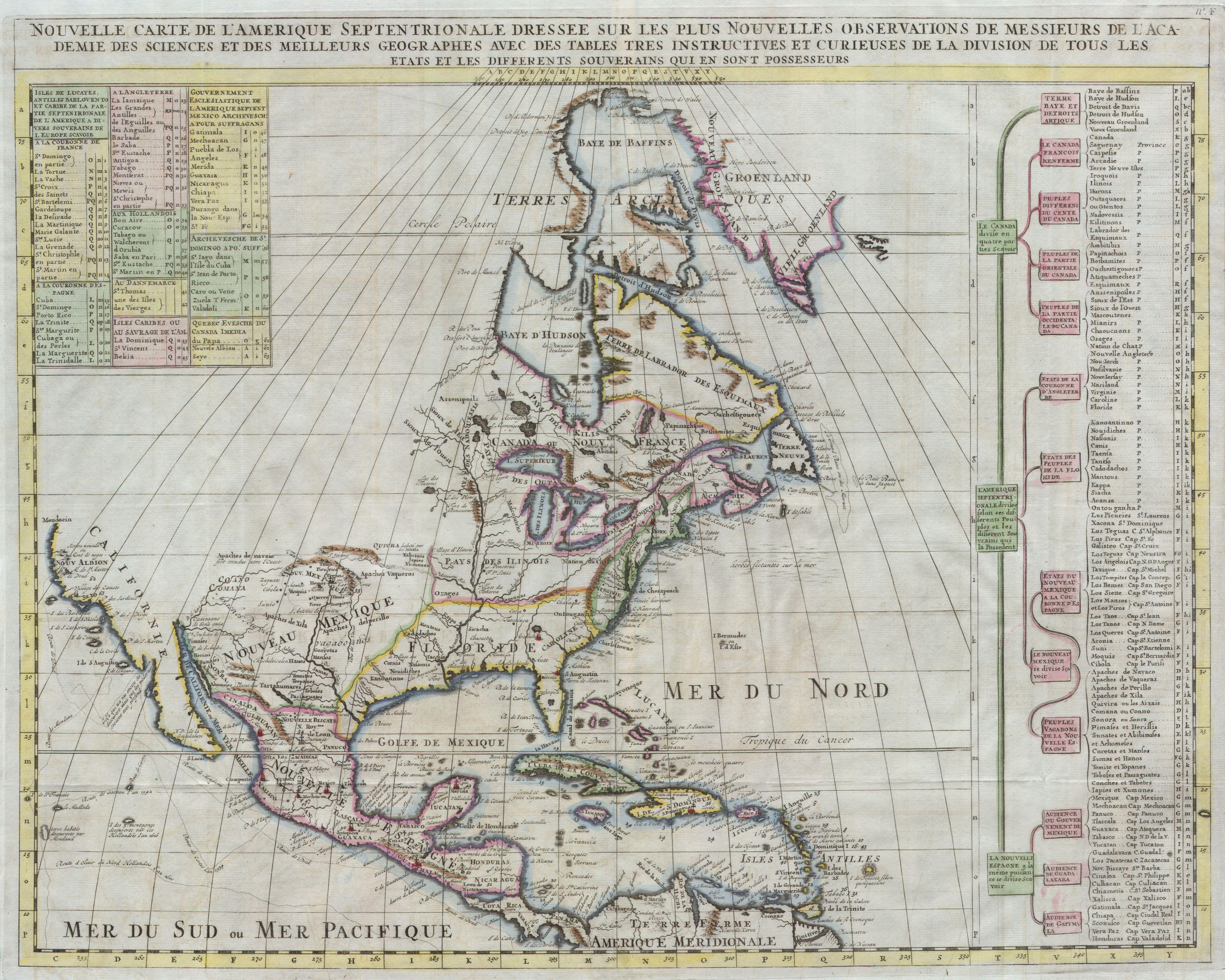
French map of 1720 North America. Acadie extends clearly into present-day New Brunswick.

During the escalation that preceded Dummer's War (1722–1725), some Acadians, the Wabanaki Confederacy and the French priests persisted in defending Acadia, which had been conceded to the British in the Treaty of Utrecht, at its border against New England. The Miꞌkmaq refused to recognize the treaty handing over their land to the English and hostilities resumed. The Miꞌkmaq raided the new fort at Canso, Nova Scotia in 1720. The Confederacy made numerous raids on New England settlements along the border into New England. Towards the end of January 1722, Governor Samuel Shute chose to launch a punitive expedition against Sébastien Rale, a Jesuit missionary, at Norridgewock. This breach of the border of Acadia, which had at any rate been ceded to the British, drew all of the tribes of the Wabanaki Confederacy into the conflict.

Under potential siege by the Confederacy, in May 1722, Lieutenant Governor John Doucett took 22 Miꞌkmaq hostage at Annapolis Royal to prevent the capital from being attacked. In July 1722, the Abenaki and Miꞌkmaq created a blockade of Annapolis Royal, with the intent of starving the capital. The natives captured 18 fishing vessels and prisoners from present-day Yarmouth to Canso. They also seized prisoners and vessels from the Bay of Fundy.

As a result of the escalating conflict, Massachusetts Governor Shute officially declared war on 22 July 1722. The first battle of Father Rale's War happened in the Nova Scotia theatre. (Note: The Nova Scotia theatre of the Dummer War is named the "Miꞌkmaq-Maliseet War" by John Grenier (Grenier 2008)) In response to the blockade of Annapolis Royal, at the end of July 1722, New England launched a campaign to end the blockade and retrieve over 86 New England prisoners taken by the natives. One of these operations resulted in the Battle at Jeddore. The next was a raid on Canso in 1723. Then in July 1724 a group of sixty Miꞌkmaq and Wolastoqiyik raided Annapolis Royal.

As a result of Father Rale's War, present-day central Maine fell again to the British with the defeat of Sébastien Rale at Norridgewock and the subsequent retreat of the native population from the Kennebec and Penobscot rivers.

==== King George's War ====
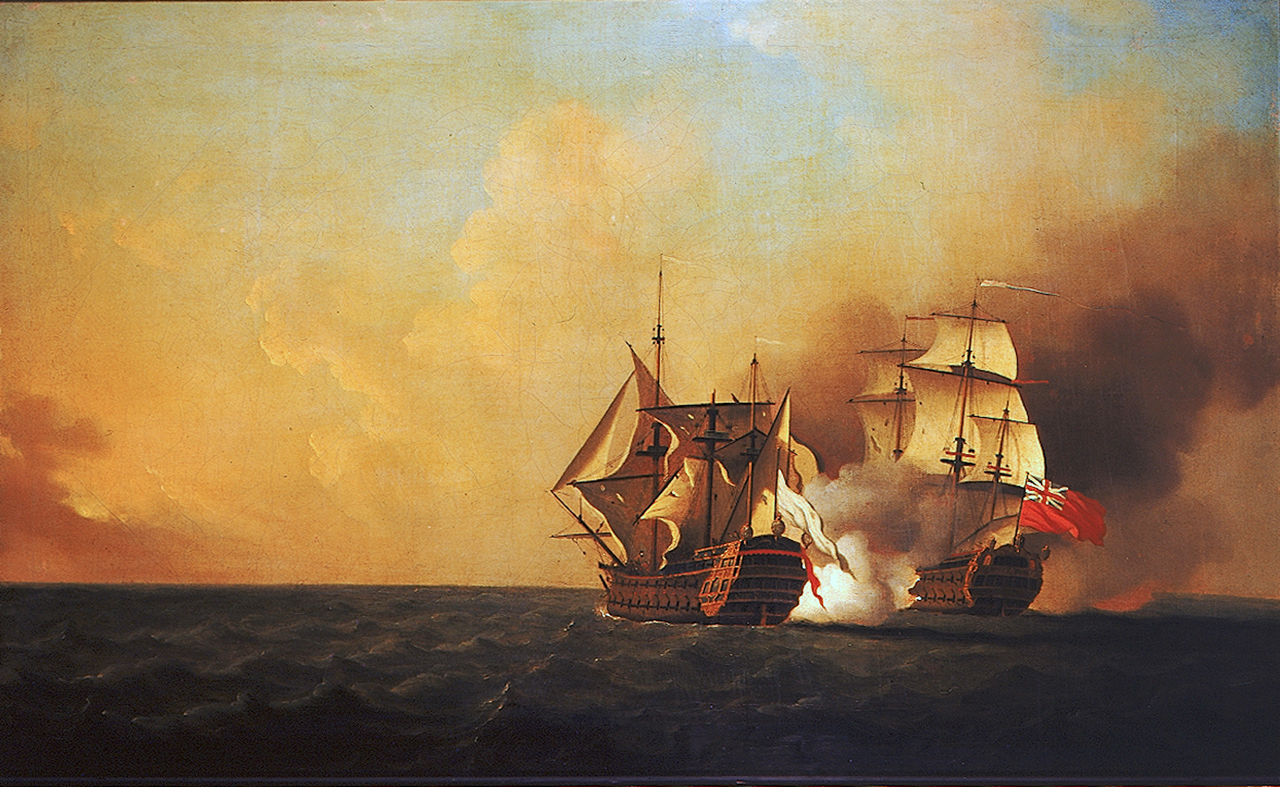
Duc d'Anville Expedition: Action between HMS Nottingham and the Mars

King George's War began when the war declarations from Europe reached the French fortress at Louisbourg first, on May 3, 1744, and the forces there wasted little time in beginning hostilities. Concerned about their overland supply lines to Quebec, they first raided the British fishing port of Canso on May 23, and then organized an attack on Annapolis Royal, then the capital of Nova Scotia. However, French forces were delayed in departing Louisbourg, and their Miꞌkmaq and Wolastoqey allies decided to attack on their own in early July. Annapolis had received news of the war declaration, and was somewhat prepared when the Indians began besieging Fort Anne. Lacking heavy weapons, the Indians withdrew after a few days. Then, in mid-August, a larger French force arrived before Fort Anne, but was also unable to mount an effective attack or siege against the garrison, which had received supplies and reinforcements from Massachusetts. In 1745, British colonial forces conducted the siege of Port Toulouse (St. Peter's) and then captured Fortress Louisbourg after a siege of six weeks. France launched a major expedition to recover Acadia in 1746. Beset by storms, disease, and finally the death of its commander, the Duc d'Anville, it returned to France in tatters without reaching its objective. French officer Jean-Baptiste Nicolas Roch de Ramezay also arrived from Quebec and conducted the Battle at Port-la-Joye on Île Saint-Jean and the Battle of Grand Pré.

==== Father Le Loutre's War (1749–1755) ====
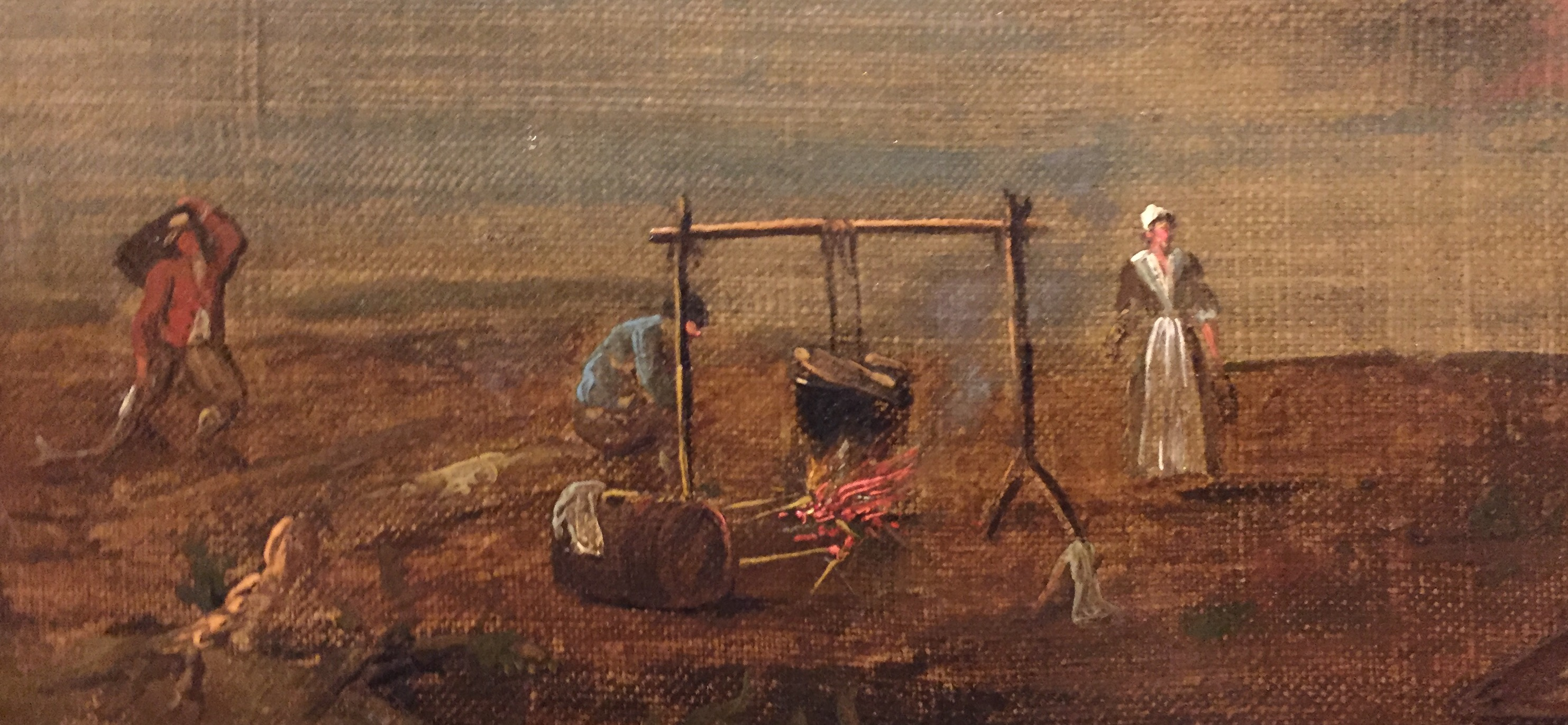
Acadians at Annapolis Royal, by Samuel Scott, 1751; earliest known image of Acadians

Despite the British capture of the Acadian capital in the siege of Port Royal (1710), Nova Scotia remained primarily occupied by Catholic Acadians and Miꞌkmaq. To prevent the establishment of Protestant settlements in the region, Miꞌkmaq raided the early British settlements of present-day Shelburne (1715) and Canso (1720). A generation later, Father Le Loutre's War began when Edward Cornwallis arrived to establish Halifax with 13 transports on 21 June 1749. (Note: The framework "Father Le Loutre's War" is developed by John Grenier in Grenier (2008) The Far Reaches of Empire. War in Nova Scotia, 1710–1760. and Grenier (2005) The First Way of War: American War Making on the Frontier, 1607–1814. He outlines his rationale for naming these conflicts as Father Le Loutre's War) The British quickly began to build other settlements. To guard against Miꞌkmaq, Acadian and French attacks on the new Protestant settlements, they erected fortifications in Halifax (Citadel Hill) (1749), Dartmouth (1750), Bedford (Fort Sackville) (1751), Lunenburg (1753) and Lawrencetown (1754). There were numerous Miꞌkmaq and Acadian raids on these villages such as the Raid on Dartmouth (1751).

Within 18 months of establishing Halifax, the British also took firm control of peninsular Nova Scotia by building fortifications in all the major Acadian communities: present-day Windsor (Fort Edward, 1750); Grand Pre (Fort Vieux Logis, 1749) and Chignecto (Fort Lawrence, 1750). (A British fort already existed at the other major Acadian centre of Annapolis Royal, Nova Scotia. Cobequid remained without a fort.) Numerous Miꞌkmaq and Acadian raids took place against these fortifications, such as the siege of Grand Pre (1749).

==== Deportation of the Acadians ====
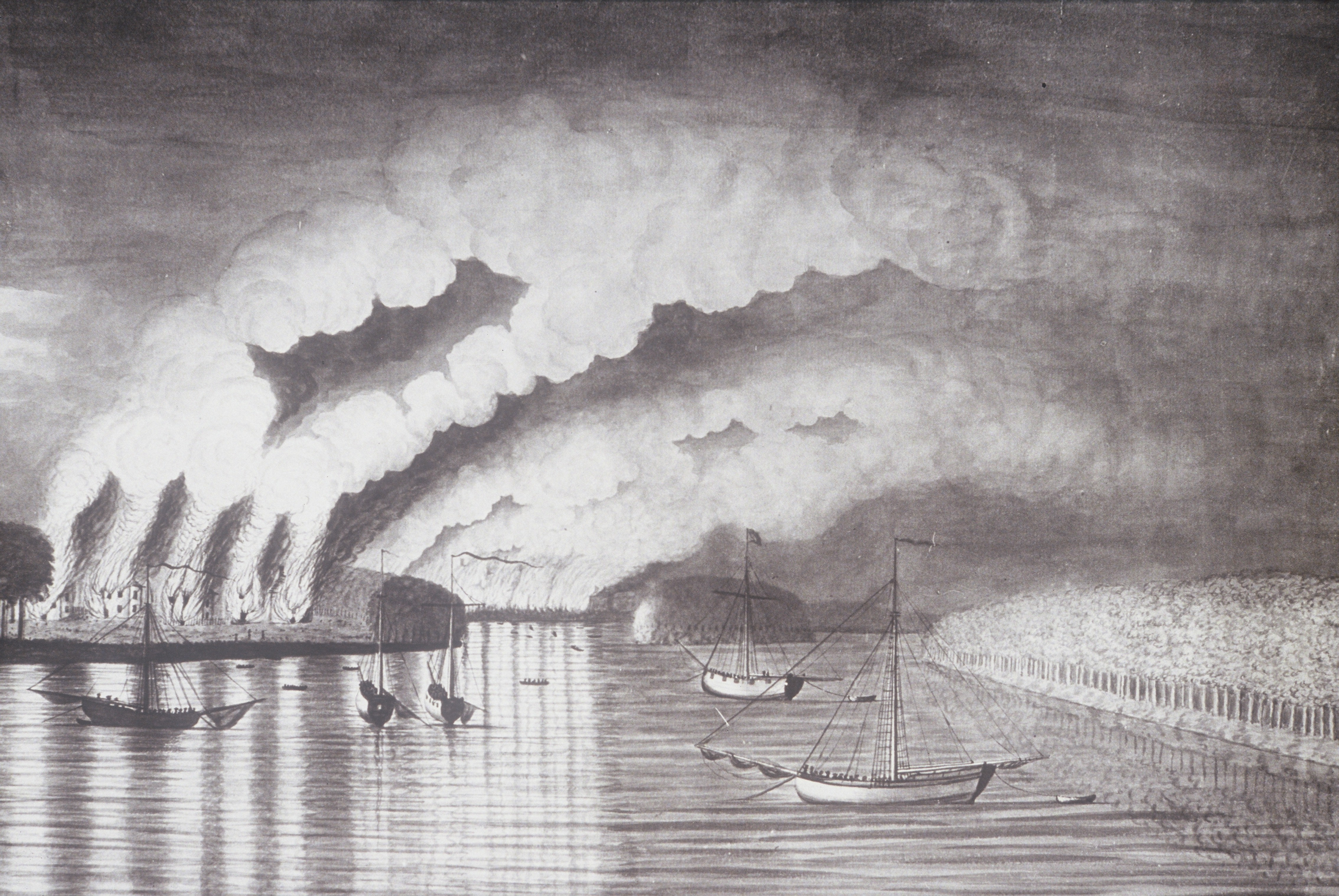
St. John River Campaign: A View of the Plundering and Burning of the City of Grimross (present-day Arcadia, New Brunswick) by Thomas Davies in 1758. This is the only contemporaneous image of the Expulsion of the Acadians.

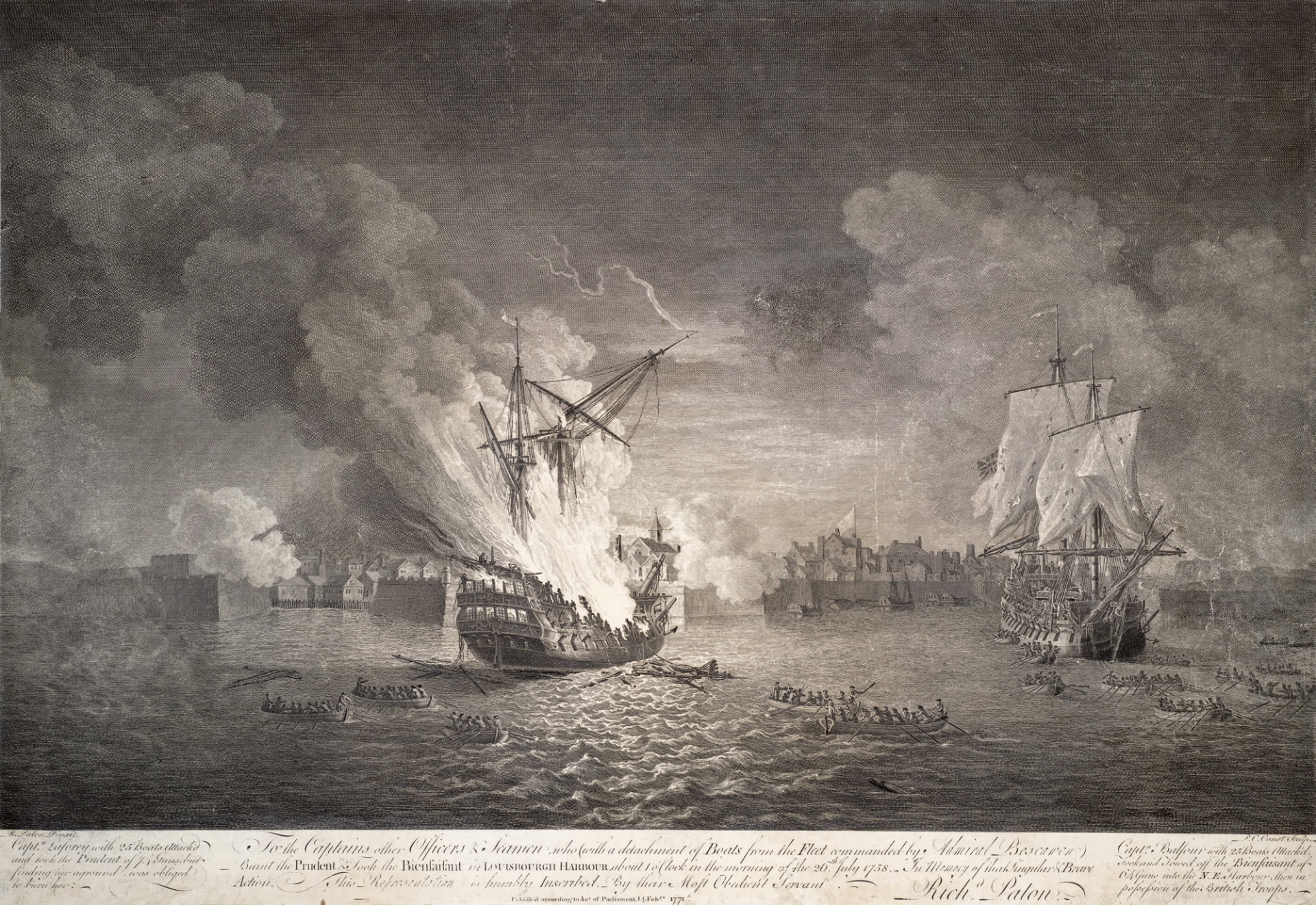
Contemporary British artist's impression of the loss of two French ships during the siege of Louisbourg in 1758.

In the years after the British conquest, the Acadians refused to swear unconditional oaths of allegiance to the British crown. During this time period some Acadians participated in militia operations against the British and maintained vital supply lines to Fortress Louisbourg and Fort Beausejour. During the French and Indian War, the British sought to neutralize any military threat Acadians posed and to interrupt the vital supply lines Acadians provided to Louisbourg by deporting them.

This process began in 1755, after the British captured Fort Beauséjour and began the expulsion of the Acadians with the Bay of Fundy Campaign. Between six and seven thousand Acadians were expelled from Nova Scotia to the lower British American colonies. Some Acadians eluded capture by fleeing deep into the wilderness or into French-controlled Canada. The Quebec town of L'Acadie (now a sector of Saint-Jean-sur-Richelieu) was founded by expelled Acadians. After the siege of Louisbourg (1758), a second wave of the expulsion began with the St. John River Campaign, Petitcodiac River Campaign, Gulf of St. Lawrence Campaign and the Île Saint-Jean Campaign.

The Acadians and the Wabanaki Confederacy put up a significant resistance to the British throughout the war. They repeatedly raided Canso, Lunenburg, Halifax, Chignecto and into New England.

Any pretense that France might maintain or regain control over the remnants of Acadia came to an end with the fall of Montreal in 1760 and the 1763 Treaty of Paris, which permanently ceded almost all of eastern New France to Britain. In 1763, Britain would designate lands west of the Appalachians as the "Indian Reserve", but did not respect Miꞌkmaq title to the Atlantic region, claiming title was obtained from the French. The Miꞌkmaq remain in Acadia to this day. After 1764, many exiled Acadians finally settled in Louisiana, which had been transferred by France to Spain as part of the Treaty of Paris which formally ended conflict between France and Great Britain over control of North America (the Seven Years' War, known as the French and Indian War in the United States). In Louisiana, the demonym Acadian developed into Cadien, anglicized as Cajun, which was first used as a pejorative term until its later mainstream acceptance.

Britain eventually moderated its policies and allowed Acadians to return to Nova Scotia. However, most of the fertile former Acadian lands were now occupied by British colonists. The returning Acadians settled instead in more outlying areas of the original Acadia, such as Cape Breton and the areas which are now New Brunswick and Prince Edward Island.

=== 19th century ===
==== Acadian Renaissance ====
Modern flag of Acadia adopted 1884

Among the Acadian descendants in the Canadian Maritime provinces, there was a revival of cultural awareness which is recognized as an Acadian Renaissance, with a struggle for recognition of Acadians as a distinct group starting in the mid-nineteenth century. Some Acadian deputies were elected to legislative assemblies, starting in 1836 with Simon d'Entremont in Nova Scotia. Several other provincial and federal members followed in New Brunswick and in Prince Edward Island.

This period saw the founding of Acadian higher educational institutions: the Saint Thomas Seminary from 1854 to 1862 and then Saint Joseph's College from 1864, both in Memramcook, New Brunswick. This was followed by the founding of Acadian newspapers: the weekly Le Moniteur Acadien in 1867 and the daily L'Évangéline in 1887 (fr), named after the epic poem by Longfellow.

In New Brunswick the 1870s saw a struggle against the Common Schools Act of 1871, which imposed a non-denominational school system and forbade religious instruction during school hours. This led to widespread Acadian protests and school-tax boycotts, culminating in the 1875 riots in the town of Caraquet. Finally in 1875 a compromise was reached allowing for some Catholic religious teaching in the schools.

In the 1880s there began a series of Acadian national conventions. The first in 1881 adopted Assumption Day (Aug.15) as the Acadian national holiday. The convention favored the argument of the priest Marcel-François Richard (fr) that Acadians are a distinct people which should have a national holiday distinct from that of Quebec (Saint-Jean-Baptiste Day). The second convention in 1884 adopted other national symbols including the flag of Acadia designed by Marcel-François Richard, and the anthem Ave maris stella. The third convention in 1890 created the Société nationale L'Assomption to promote the interests of the Acadian people in the Maritimes. Other Acadian national conventions continued until the fifteenth in 1972.

In 1885, the author, historian and linguist Pascal Poirier became the first Acadian member of the Senate of Canada.

=== 20th century and beyond ===
By the early twentieth century, some Acadians were chosen for leadership positions in New Brunswick. In 1912, Monseigneur Édouard LeBlanc of Nova Scotia was named bishop of Saint John, after a campaign lasting many years to convince the Vatican to appoint an Acadian bishop. In 1917, the premier of Prince Edward Island resigned to accept a judicial position, and his Conservative Party chose Aubin-Edmond Arsenault as successor until the next election in 1919. Arsenault thus became the first Acadian provincial premier of any province in Canada. In 1923, Peter Veniot became the first Acadian premier of New Brunswick when he was chosen by the Liberal Party to complete the term of the retiring premier until 1925.

The expansion of Acadian influence in the Catholic church continued in 1936 with the creation of the Archdiocese of Moncton whose first archbishop was Louis-Joseph-Arthur Melanson, and whose Cathédrale Notre-Dame de l’Assomption was completed in 1940. The new archdiocese was expanded to include new predominantly Acadian dioceses in Bathurst, New Brunswick (1938), in Edmundston (1944) and in Yarmouth, Nova Scotia (1953).

==== Government of Louis Robichaud ====
In 1960, Louis Robichaud became the first Acadian to be elected premier of a Canadian province. He was elected premier of New Brunswick in 1960 and served three terms until 1970.

The Robichaud government created the Université de Moncton in 1963 as a unilingual French-language university, corresponding to the much older unilingual English-language University of New Brunswick. In 1964, two different deputy ministers of education were named to direct English-language and French-language school systems respectively. In the next few years, the Université de Moncton absorbed the former Saint-Joseph's College, as well as the École Normale (teacher's college) which trained French-speaking teachers for the Acadian schools. In 1977, two French-speaking colleges in Northern New Brunswick were transformed into the Edmundston and Shippagan campuses of the Université de Moncton.

The New Brunswick Equal Opportunity program of 1967 introduced reforms of municipal structures, of health care, of education, and of the administration of justice. In general, these changes tended to reduce economic inequality between regions of the province, and therefore tended to favour the disadvantaged Acadian regions.

The New Brunswick Official Languages Act (1969) declared New Brunswick officially bilingual with English and French having equal status as official languages. Residents have the right to receive provincial government services in the official language of their choice.

==== After 1970 ====
The New Brunswick government of Richard Hatfield (1970–87) cooperated with the Government of Canada in including the right to linguistic equality in the province as a part of the Canadian Charter of Rights and Freedoms of 1982, so that it cannot be rescinded by any future provincial government.

Nova Scotia adopted Bill 65 in 1981 to give Acadian schools legal status, and also created a study program including Acadian history and culture. The Acadian schools were placed under separate management in 1996.

Prince Edward Island provided French-language schools in 1980 in areas with a sufficient number of Acadian students, followed by a French-language school commission for the province in 1990. In 2000 a decision of the Supreme Court of Canada obliged the provincial government to build French schools at least in Charlottetown and Summerside, the two largest communities.

The new French-language daily newspaper L'Acadie Nouvelle published in Caraquet appeared in 1984, replacing L’Évangeline which ceased publication in 1982.

The series of Acadian National Conventions from 1881 to 1972 was followed by an Acadian National Orientation Convention in 1979 at Edmundston. Since 1994, there has been a new series of Acadian World Congresses at five-year intervals starting with 1994 in southeastern New Brunswick and 1999 in Louisiana. The most recent was centered in Summerside, Prince Edward Island in 2019.

== Territory ==
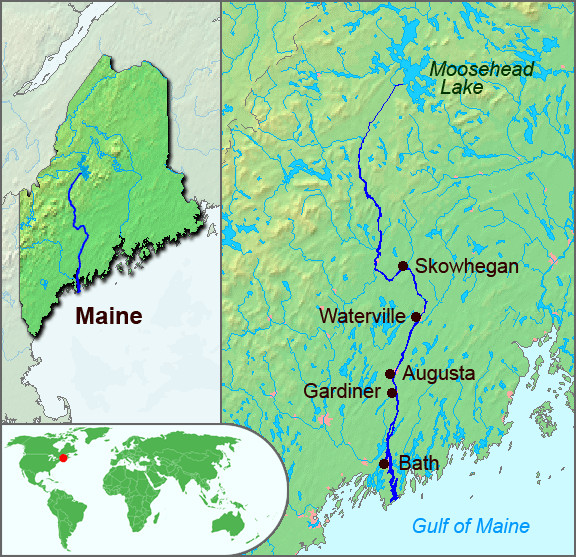
The French claimed that the Kennebec River formed the border between Acadia and New England, seen here on a map of Maine

During much of the 17th and early 18th centuries, Norridgewock on the Kennebec River and Castine at the end of the Penobscot River were the southernmost settlements of Acadia. The French government defined the borders of Acadia as roughly between the 40th and 46th parallels on the Atlantic coast.

The borders of French Acadia were not clearly defined, but the following areas were at some time part of French Acadia:

- Present-day mainland Nova Scotia, with Port Royal as its capital. Lost to Great Britain in 1713.
- Present-day New Brunswick, which remained part of Nova Scotia until becoming a separate colony in 1784. Lost to Great Britain in 1763.
- Île-Royale, later Cape Breton Island, with the Fortress of Louisbourg. Lost to Great Britain in 1763.
- Île Saint-Jean, later Prince Edward Island. Lost to Great Britain in 1763.
- The part of present-day Maine east of the Kennebec River. Lost to Great Britain in 1763.

== Notable military figures of Acadia ==
The following list includes those who were born in Acadia (yet not necessarily of Acadian ethnicity) or those who became naturalized citizens prior to the fall of the French in the region in 1763. Those who came for brief periods from other countries are not included (e.g. John Gorham, Edward Cornwallis, James Wolfe, Boishébert, etc.).

=== 17th–18th century ===
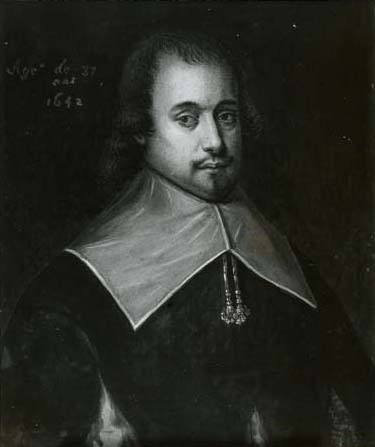
Charles de Menou d'Aulnay – Civil War in Acadia

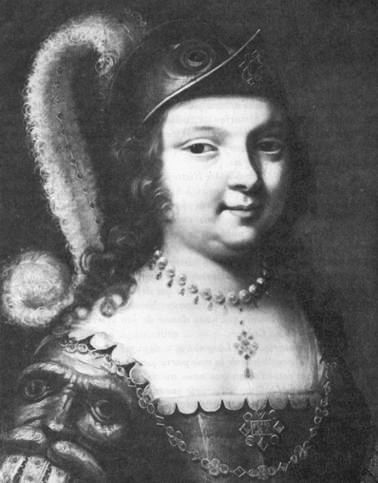
Françoise-Marie Jacquelin – Civil War in Acadia

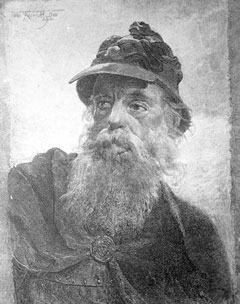
Baron de Saint-Castin – Castine's War

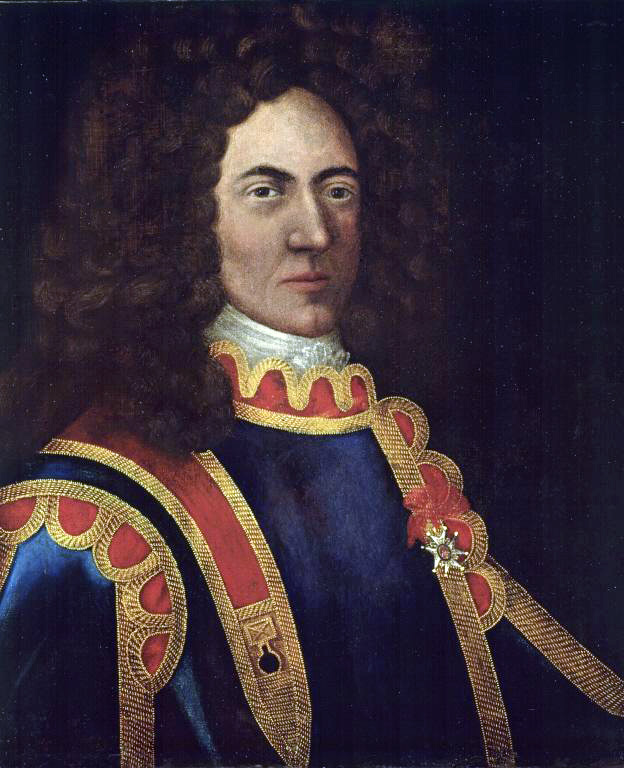
Jean-Baptiste Hertel de Rouville – Queen Anne's War

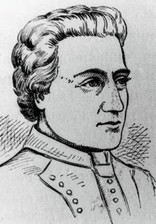
Daniel d'Auger de Subercase, last governor of Acadia 1706–1710

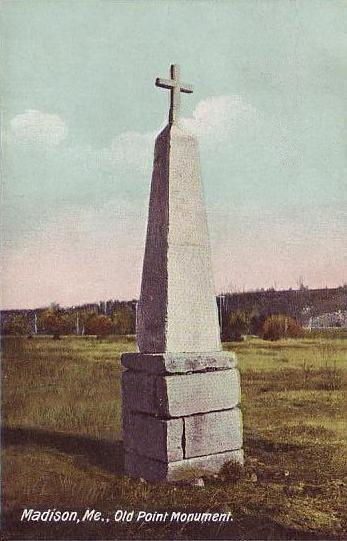
Sébastien Rale – Father Rale's War

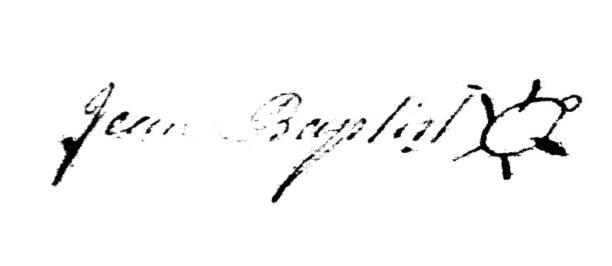
Chief Jean-Baptiste Cope – Father Le Loutre's War

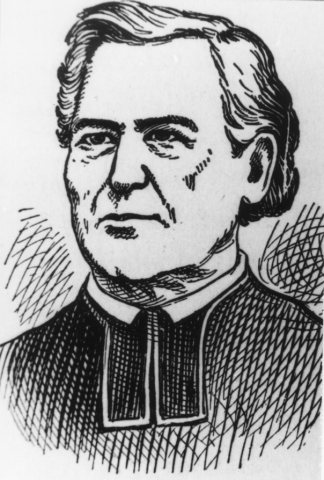
Jean-Louis Le Loutre – Father Le Loutre's War

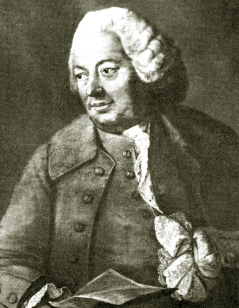
Thomas Pichon

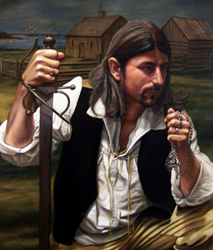
Joseph (Beausoleil) Broussard

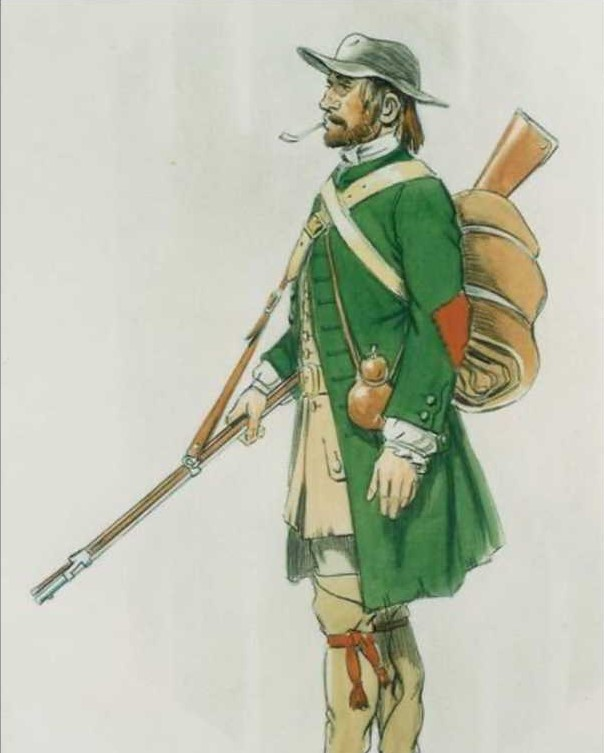
Joseph Godin – French and Indian War

==== Others ====
- Charles de Saint-Étienne de la Tour – Civil War in Acadia
- Chief Madockawando – King William's War
- John Gyles – King William's War
- Father Louis-Pierre Thury– King William's War
- Pierre Maisonnat dit Baptiste – Queen Anne's War
- Charles Morris (jurist) – King George's War
- Pierre Maillard – Father Le Loutre's War
- Joseph-Nicolas Gautier – Father Le Loutre's War
- Pierre II Surette – French and Indian War

== Government ==
Acadia was in territory disputed between France and Great Britain. England controlled the area from 1621 to 1632 (see William Alexander, 1st Earl of Stirling) and again from 1654 until 1670 (see William Crowne and Thomas Temple), with control permanently regained by its successor state, the Kingdom of Great Britain, in 1710 (ceded under the Treaty of Utrecht in 1713). Although France controlled the territory in the remaining periods, French monarchs consistently neglected Acadia. Civil government under the French regime was held by a series of Governors (see List of governors of Acadia). The government of New France was in Quebec, but it had only nominal authority over the Acadians.

The Acadians implemented village self-rule. Even after Canada had given up its elected spokesmen, the Acadians continued to demand a say in their own government, as late as 1706 petitioning the monarchy to allow them to elect spokesmen each year by a plurality of voices. In a sign of his indifference to the colony, Louis XV agreed to their demand. This representative assembly was a direct offshoot of a government system that developed out of the seigneurial and church parish imported from Europe. The seigneurial system was a "set of legal regimes and practices pertaining to local landholding, politics, economics, and jurisprudence." Many of the French governors of Acadia prior to Hector d'Andigné de Grandfontaine held seigneuries in Acadia. As Seigneur, in addition to the power held as governor, they held the right to grant land, collect their seigneurial rents, and act in judgement over disputes within their domain. After Acadia came under direct Royal rule under Grandfontaine the Seigneurs continued to fulfill governance roles. The Acadian seignuerial system came to an end when the British Crown bought the seigneurial rights in the 1730s.

The Catholic parish system along with the accompanying parish priest also aided in the development Acadian self-government. Priests, given their respected position, often assisted the community in representation with the civil government at Port Royal/Annapolis Royal. Within each parish the Acadians used the elected marguilliers (wardens) of the conseil de fabrique to administer more than just the churches' affairs in the parishes. The Acadians extended this system to see to the administrative needs of the community in general. The Acadians protected this structure from the priests and were "No mere subordinates to clerical authority, wardens were 'always suspicious of any interference by the priests' in the life of the rural parish, an institution which was, ... , largely a creation of the inhabitants." During the British regime many of the deputies were drawn from this marguillier group.

The Acadians occupied a borderland region of the British and French empires. As such the Acadian homeland was subjected to the ravages of war on numerous occasions. Through experience the Acadians learned to distrust imperial authorities (British and French). This is evidenced in a small way when Acadians were uncooperative with census takers. Administrators complained of constant in-fighting among the population, which filed many petty civil suits with colonial magistrates. Most of these were over boundary lines, as the Acadians were very quick to protect their new lands.

=== Governance under the British after 1710 ===
After 1710, the British military administration continued to utilize the deputy system the Acadians had developed under French colonial rule. Prior to 1732 the deputies were appointed by the governor from men in the districts of Acadian families "as ancientest and most considerable in Lands & possessions,". This appears to be in contravention of various British penal laws which made it nearly impossible for Roman Catholics and Protestant recusants to hold military and government positions. The need for effective administration and communication in many of the British colonies trumped the laws.

In 1732, the governance institution was formalized. Under the formalized system the colony was divided into eight districts. Annually on October 11 free elections were to take place where each district, depending on its size, was to elect two, three, or four deputies. In observance of the Lord's Day, if October 11 fell on a Sunday the elections were to take place on the immediately following Monday. Notice of the annual election was to be given in all districts thirty days before the election date. Immediately following election, deputies, both outgoing and incoming, were to report to Annapolis Royal to receive the governor's approval and instructions. Prior to 1732 deputies had complained about the time and expense of holding office and carrying out their duties. Under the new elected deputy system each district was to provide for the expenses of their elected deputies.

The duties of the deputies were broad and included reporting to the government in council the affairs of the districts, distribution of government proclamations, assistance in the settlement of various local disputes (primarily related to land), and ensuring that various weights and measures used in trade were "Conformable to the Standard".

In addition to deputies, several other public positions existed. Each district had a clerk who worked closely with the deputies and under his duties recorded the records and orders of government, deeds and conveyances, and kept other public records. With the rapid expansion of the Acadian populace, there was also a growing number of cattle and sheep. The burgeoning herds and flocks, often free-ranging, necessitated the creation of the position of Overseer of Flocks. These individuals controlled where the flocks grazed, settled disputes and recorded the names of individuals slaughtering animals to ensure proper ownership. Skins and hides were inspected for brands.

After the purchase by the British Crown of the seigniorial rights in Acadia, various rents and fees were due to the Crown. In the Minas, Piziquid and Cobequid Districts the seigniorial fees were collected by the "Collector & Receiver of All His Majesty's Quit Rents, Dues, or Revenues". The Collector was to keep a record of all rents and other fees collected, submit the rents to Annapolis Royal, and retain fifteen percent to cover his expenses.

== Population ==
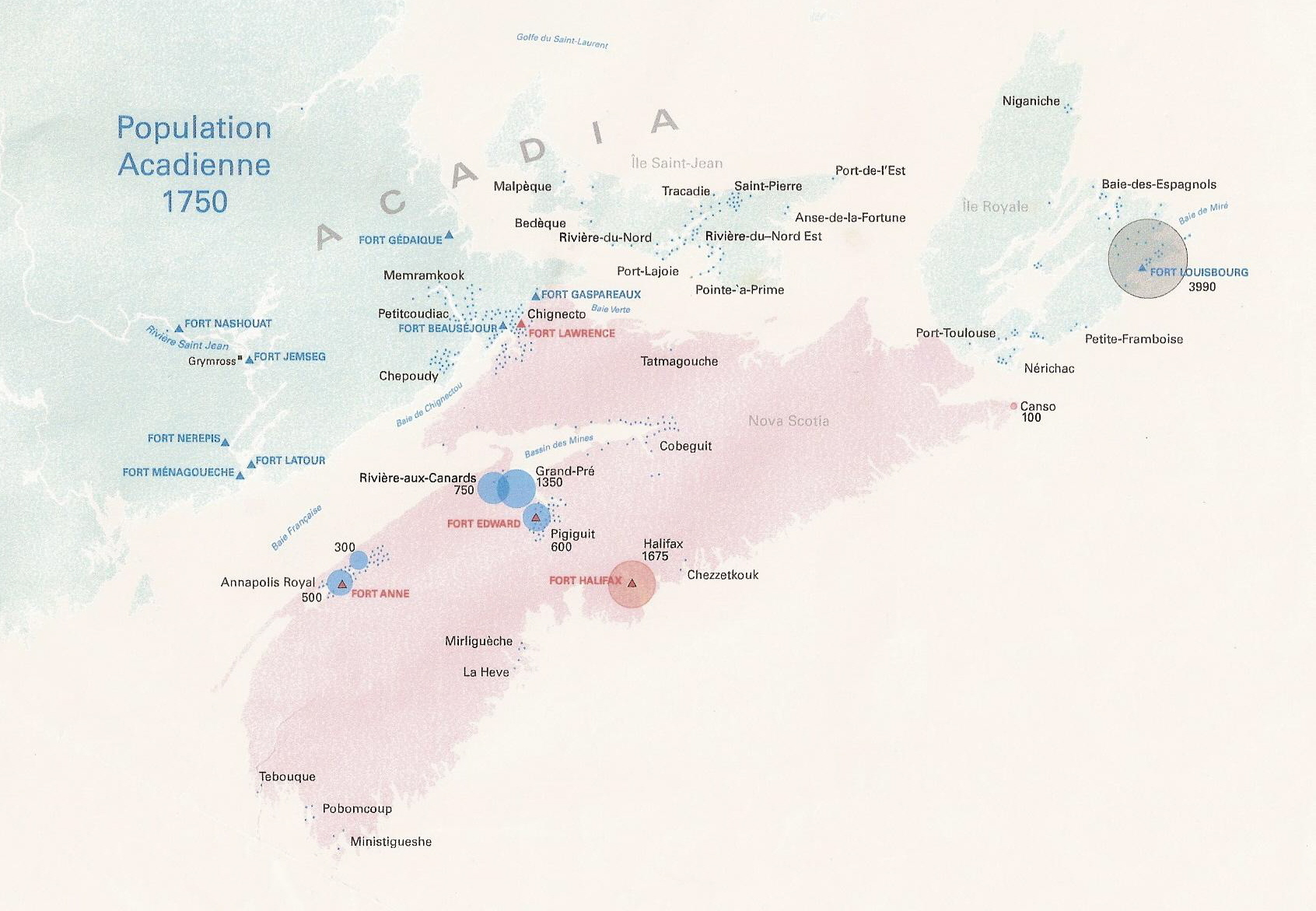
Main Acadian communities before the deportation

Before 1654, trading companies and patent holders concerned with fishing recruited men in France to come to Acadia to work at the commercial outposts. The original Acadian population was a small number of indentured servants and soldiers brought by the fur-trading companies.

Gradually, fishermen began settling in the area as well, rather than return to France with the seasonal fishing fleet. The majority of the recruiting took place at La Rochelle. Between 1653 and 1654, 104 men were recruited at La Rochelle. Of these, 31% were builders, 15% were soldiers and sailors, 8% were food preparers, 6.7% were farm workers, and an additional 6.7% worked in the clothing trades. Fifty-five percent of Acadia's first families came from western and southwestern France, primarily from Poitou, Aquitaine, Angoumois, and Saintonge. Over 85% of these (47% of the total), were former residents of the La Chaussée area of Poitou.

Many of the families who arrived in 1632 with Isaac de Razilly shared some blood ties; those not related by blood shared cultural ties with the others. The number of original immigrants was very small, and only about 100 surnames existed within the Acadian community.

Many of the earliest French settlers in Acadia intermarried with the local Mi'kmaq tribe.

This Acadian flag was established at the second Acadian Convention in 1884 at Miscouche, Prince Edward Island.

A Parisian lawyer, Marc Lescarbot, who spent just over a year in Acadia, arriving in May 1606, described the Micmac as having "courage, fidelity, generosity, and humanity, and their hospitality is so innate and praiseworthy that they receive among them every man who is not an enemy. They are not simpletons. ... So that if we commonly call them Savages, the word is abusive and unmerited."

Most of the immigrants to Acadia were poor peasants in France, making them social equals in this new context. The colony had very limited economic support or cultural contacts with France, leaving a "social vacuum" that allowed "individual talents and industry ... [to supplant] inherited social position as the measure of a man's worth." Acadians lived as social equals, with the elderly and priests considered slightly superior.

Unlike the French colonists in Canada and the early English colonies in Plymouth and Jamestown, Acadians maintained an extended kinship system, and the large extended families assisted in building homes and barns, as well as cultivating and harvesting crops. They also relied on interfamily cooperation to accomplish community goals, such as building dikes to reclaim tidal marshes.

Marriages were generally not love matches but were arranged for economic or social reasons. Parental consent was required for anyone under 25 who wished to marry, and both the mother's and father's consent was recorded in the marriage deed. Divorce was not permitted in New France, and annulments were almost impossible to get. Legal separation was offered as an option but was seldom used.

The Acadians were suspicious of outsiders and on occasion did not readily cooperate with census takers. The first reliable population figures for the area came with the census of 1671, which noted fewer than 450 people. By 1714, the Acadian population had expanded to 2,528 individuals, mostly from natural increase rather than immigration. Most Acadian women in the 18th century gave birth to living children an average of eleven times. Although these numbers are identical to those in Canada, 75% of Acadian children reached adulthood, many more than in other parts of New France. The isolation of the Acadian communities meant the people were not exposed to many of the imported epidemics, allowing the children to remain healthier.

In 1714, a few Acadian families emigrated to Île Royale. These families had little property. But for the majority of Acadians, they could not be enticed by the French government to abandon their family lands for an area which was unknown and uncultivated.

Some Acadians migrated to nearby Île Saint-Jean (now Prince Edward Island) to take advantage of the fertile cropland. In 1732, the island had 347 settlers but within 25 years its population had expanded to 5000 Europeans. Much of the population surge on Île Saint-Jean took place in the 1750s, as Acadians left during the rising tensions on peninsular Nova Scotia after the settlement of Halifax in 1749. Le Loutre played a role in these removals through acts of encouragement and threats. The exodus to Île Saint-Jean became a flood with refugees fleeing British-held territory after the initial expulsions of 1755.

In contemporary Atlantic Canada, it is estimated that there are 300,000 French-speaking Acadians. In addition, there is a diaspora of over three million Acadian descendants in the world, primarily in the United States, in Canada outside the Atlantic region, and in France.

== Economy ==
Most Acadian households were self-sufficient, with families engaged in subsistence farming only for a few years while they established their farms. Very rapidly the Acadians established productive farms that yielded surplus crops that allowed them to trade with both Boston and Louisbourg. (Note: Fowler's analysis of census records and other primary documents reveal that most farms by 1686 were producing in livestock alone, on a per capita basis, twice as much as was needed for their own consumption. This does not include food crops and the animals harvested from the natural environment.) Farms tended to remain small plots of land worked by individual families rather than slave labor. The highly productive dyked marshlands and cleared uplands produced an abundance of fodder that supported significant production of cows, sheep and pigs. Farmers grew various grains: wheat, oats, barley, hops and rye; vegetables: peas, cabbage, turnips, onions, carrots, chives, shallots, asparagus, parsnips and beets; fruit: apples, pears, cherries, plums, raspberry and white strawberry. In addition they grew crops of hemp and flax for the production of cloth, rope, etc.

From the rivers, estuaries and seas they harvested shad, smelts, gaspereau, cod, salmon, bass, etc., utilizing fish traps in the rivers, weirs in the inter-tidal zone and from the sea with lines and nets from their boats. The fishery was pursued on a commercial basis as in 1715 at the Minas Basin settlements, when the Acadian population there numbered only in the hundreds, they had "between 30 - 40 sail of vessels, built by themselves, which they employ in fishing" reported Lieutenant-Governor Thomas Caulfield to the Board of Trade. Charles Morris observed the Acadians at Minas hunting beluga whales. The Acadians also varied their diets by hunting for moose, hare, ducks and geese, and pigeon.

After 1630, the Acadians began to build dikes and drain the sea marsh above Port Royal. The high salinity of the reclaimed coastal marshland meant that the land would need to sit for three years after it was drained before it could be cultivated. The land reclamation techniques that were used closely resembled the enclosures near La Rochelle that helped make solar salt.

As time progressed, the Acadian agriculture improved, and Acadians traded with the British colonies in New England to gain ironware, fine cloth, rum, and salt. During the French administration of Acadia, this trade was illegal, but it did not stop some English traders from establishing small stores in Port Royal. Under English rule, the Acadians traded with New England and often smuggled their excess food to Boston merchants waiting at Baie Verte for transshipment to the French at Louisbourg on Cape Breton Island.

Many adult sons who did not inherit land from their parents settled on adjacent vacant lands to remain close to their families. As the Acadian population expanded and available land became limited around Port Royal, new settlements took root to the northeast, in the Upper Bay of Fundy, including Mines, Pisiquid, and Beaubassin. Many of the pioneers into that area persuaded some of their relatives to accompany them, and most of the frontier settlements contained only five to ten interrelated family units.

== See also ==
- Acadia National Park
- Acadian architecture
- Acadian cinema
- Acadian culture
- Acadian French
- Acadian literature
- Acadian Renaissance
- Acadiana
- Cajuns
- Expulsion of the Acadians
- Former colonies and territories in Canada
- History of the Acadians (from 1604 to 21st century)
- History of Aquitaine
- List of Acadians
- List of governors of Acadia
- Military history of Nova Scotia
- Military history of the Acadians
- Religion in Acadia
