= Dy =

DY, D. Y., Dy, or dy may refer to:

== Science and technology ==
- dy, Leibniz's notation for the differential of a variable y
- Dysprosium (symbol Dy), a chemical element
- 1,4-Dioxane, a solvent

=== Astronomy ===
- DY Persei, a variable star in the constellation Perseus
- DY Persei variable, a subclass of R Coronae Borealis variables
- DY Eridani, a triple star system less than 16.5 light years away from Earth

== Businesses ==
- Norwegian Air Shuttle (IATA code: DY)
- Alyemda (former IATA code: DY), a former Yemeni airline
- DY, clothing brand of singer Daddy Yankee

== People ==
- Dy (surname), a surname in various cultures (including a list of people with the surname)
- DY (rapper) (born 1984), Canadian rapper
- DY, member of the American record production and songwriting team 808 Mafia
- Lady Di, Diana, Princess of Wales

== Places ==
- DY, the official International vehicle registration code for Benin (formerly Dahomey)
- DY postcode area, in England
- DY Patil Stadium, a cricket stadium in India
- D. Y. Patil college of Engineering and Technology, Kolhapur, in India

== Other uses ==
- dy (digraph), a digraph used in rendering the Xhosa and Shona languages, as well as some Australian Aboriginal languages such as Warlpiri
- Deputy (disambiguation)
- DY, a line of clothing from Puerto Rican singer Daddy Yankee

== See also ==
- Dee Why, a suburb in Sydney, Australia
- Die (disambiguation)
- Dye (disambiguation)
- YD (disambiguation)
