= Our Lady of the Assumption Cathedral (Moncton) =

- The Monument for Recognition (French: Le Monument de la Reconnaissance)
- Cathédrale Notre-Dame de l’Assomption
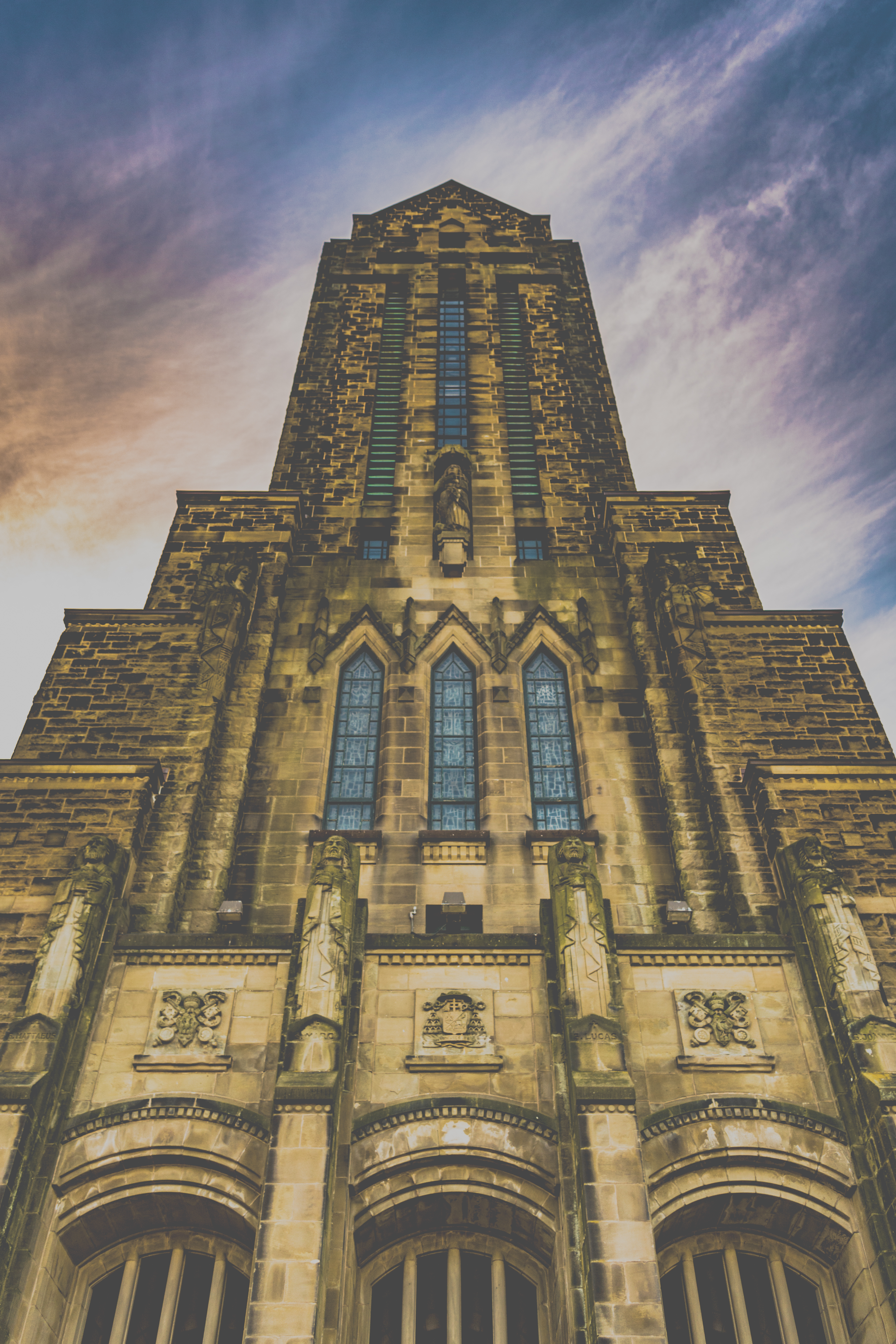
- Our Lady of the Assumption Cathedral
- 46°05′27″N 64°46′54″W
- Location: 226 St-George Street Moncton, New Brunswick
- Country: Canada
- Denomination: Catholic
- Website: www.diomoncton.ca/en/notre-dame-de-lassomptions-cathedral

Architecture
- Completed: 1940

Administration
- Archdiocese: Roman Catholic Archdiocese of Moncton

Clergy
- Archbishop: Guy Desrochers

Our Lady of the Assumption Cathedral (French: Cathédrale Notre-Dame de l’Assomption), also known as The Monument for Recognition, is located in the Roman Catholic Archdiocese of Moncton in Moncton, New Brunswick, Canada.

Since 2019, the cathedral has been the site of an interpretation centre, Monument for Recognition in the 21st century (MR21).

== History ==
The cathedral was built on the foundations of the crypt-chapel of the parish of Our Lady of the Assumption, founded in 1914 by Henri D. Cormier. Louis-Joseph-Arthur Melanson, the first archbishop of the new Archdiocese of Moncton, took office on 22 February 1937, and announced on 9 January 1938, his intention to erect a cathedral-basilica dedicated to the Virgin Mary. The architect who designed the plans for the cathedral was Louis-Napoléon Audet of Sherbrooke. Work began on 24 April 1939 by the Ambrose Wheeler company of Moncton, two days after the signing of the contract. The electrical wiring was installed by the Quebec company M. T.-E. Danahue. The cornerstone of the building was blessed on 13 June 1939, at 3:00 pm by Melanson. The exterior and interior of the building were completed in the fall of 1940. The official inauguration was made on 21 November 1940 in the company of the Archbishop of Quebec Cardinal Villeneuve, the Bishop of Bathurst Patrice Alexandre Chiasson, and the Bishop of Saint John Patrick Albert Bray.

The bell tower holds one bell weighing 2.5 tons. It was brought from France in 1932. It has not been rung in over 10 years because one of the wooden yokes the bell hangs from is cracked.

== Interpretation centre ==
The MR21 interpretation centre offers digital installations, including a 360-degree show that tells the life of Melanson, first archbishop of the Archdiocese of Moncton, and the individuals who built the cathedral. The center also offers visitors two large interactive screens that allow them to discover the history hidden in the Stained glass windows of the transept.
