= St. Michael's Basilica (Miramichi, New Brunswick) =

Catholic church in New Brunswick, Canada

Saint Michael's Basilica, Miramichi
- Basilica of St. Michael the Archangel
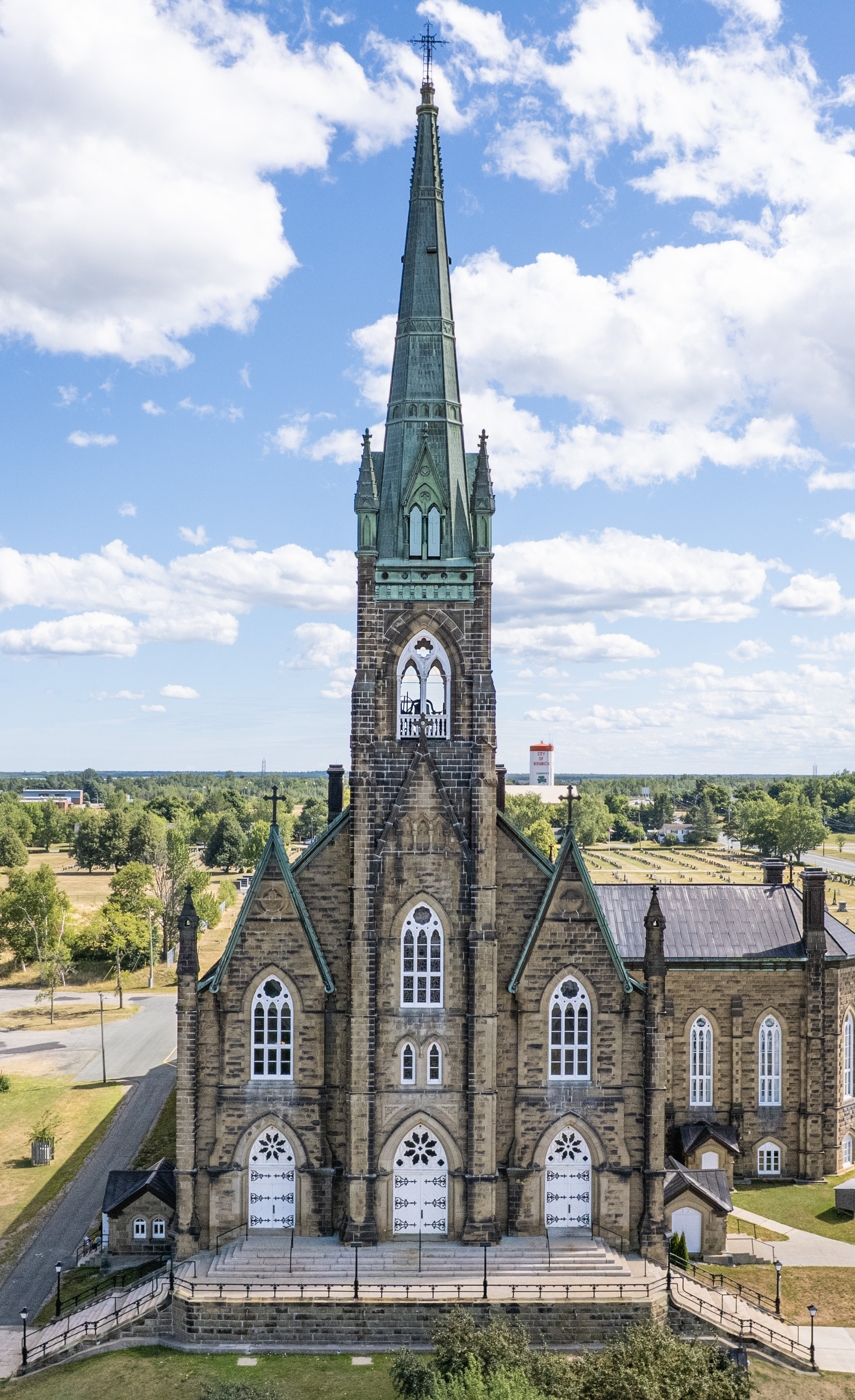
- St. Michael's Basilica, Miramichi

- Location within New Brunswick
- 47.0261°N 65.4656°W
- Location: 10 Howard Street Miramichi, New Brunswick
- Country: Canada
- Denomination: Catholic Church
- Sui iuris church: Latin Church
- Website: stmichaelsbasilica.com

History
- Status: Cathedral
- Dedicated: 1921

Architecture
- Functional status: Active
- Architect: P. Keely
- Architectural type: neo-Gothic

Specifications
- Capacity: 1,200 people
- Materials: sandstone and marble

The Basilica of Saint Michael the Archangel is a Catholic church located on a hill overlooking the Miramichi River in the province of New Brunswick, Canada. It is a prominent feature of the former town of Chatham, New Brunswick, and one of the largest churches in Eastern Canada. It is now included within the city of Miramichi, which was formed in 1995.

Pope John Paul II raised the shrine to the status of Minor Basilica via his decree Inter Sacras Diœcesis on 28 January 1989. The decree was signed and notarized by Cardinal Agostino Casaroli.

== Design ==
Saint Michael's Basilica is among the largest churches in Canada, east of Quebec City. The sandstone neo-Gothic structure was designed by Patrick Keely, the same architect of Holy Name Cathedral in Chicago, and the St's. Peter and Paul Cathedral in Providence, Rhode Island. St. Michael's Basilica is 15 ft (4.6 m) taller than Holy Name in Chicago, somewhat narrower, and about the same length. Holy Name seats about 300 more people (1,520 vs 1,200). Construction of the cathedral started in 1903 and finished in 1921. Italian marble with veined panels was used throughout the interior of the nave and the sacristy. The spire is visible for several miles, especially when approaching Chatham from the north, across the Centennial Bridge that spans the Miramichi River.

== Congregation ==
St. Michael's Basilica has a historical connection with the Irish Catholics who immigrated to New Brunswick before the Great Famine. As late as the 1980s, large numbers of worshipers attended daily mass during Lent. The church was one way that the new Catholic immigrants of all ethnic origins maintained their unique identity.

When the Irish Catholics came to Canada, unlike their counterparts in the United States, they were barred from public office and the professions. They were required in the early days to tithe to the Church of England. These barriers were lifted during the 19th century, but Irish Catholics remained marginalized and banded together to protect their interests, with St. Michael's helping to bring them all together. The parish served by St. Michael's had a long history of providing priests for the area and sending others to the foreign missions or to Western Canada. By 1975, however, vocations to the priesthood from Chatham and the area had essentially dried up.

== Features ==
The basilica was built as the cathedral of a once-extensive Diocese of Chatham, that covered the northern part of the province. The diocese moved to the French-speaking town of Bathurst, approximately 45 mi (72 km) north, in 1938, and Sacred Heart Cathedral became the seat of the new Diocese of Bathurst.

Notable features of the cathedral are the Lady chapel to the west of the main church, a tall single spire (once illuminated by the Canadian Air Force because of the proximity of a fighter base), a green copper roof, and a matching Bishop's Palace to the southeast. Its bells, whether tolling a funeral, sounding the Angelus, or ringing in Easter or Christmas, have long been a feature of life in the town. A fine stand of linden trees, planted by Bishop James Rogers, stands to the east of the basilica, in front of the palace.

== Designation ==
The church is unique in that it was the cathedral of the Diocese of Chatham, but lost that distinction when the see moved in 1938. The church was then designated a proto-cathedral until 1989, when Pope John Paul II elevated it to a minor basilica.

== Pastors ==
List of parish priests since the construction of the basilica:

Name	Dates of service	Other information
Monsignor Michael O'Keefe	1904–1934	Traditional in style. Died in office.
Reverend Burns	1934–1946	A quiet man. Died in office.
Reverend William J. Wallace	1946–1961	Chatham native who retired due to a motor neuron disease.
Reverend Lynn McFadden	1961–1975	Previously rector of St. Thomas University.
Reverend Bernard M.Broderick	1975–1982	Active in the Cooperative Movement. Retired in Chatham.
Reverend Peter Bagley	1982–1988	
Reverend Leon Creamer	1988–1993	A well-liked sports enthusiast.
Reverend Leo Sullivan		A gentle man and Chatham native who retired in Chatham.
Reverend Joseph Daley	1993–1996	Moved to the North West Territories and ministered there for many years.
Reverend Paul Riley	1996–1999	
Reverend John Fraser	1999– 2015	From nearby Loggieville.
Reverend John Beaumaster	2015–2017	
Reverend Paul Doucet	2017–2021	
Reverend Arockia Dass Chinnappan, HGN	2018–2021	
Reverend Daniel Bastarache	2021 –	
Reverend Antonio Reyes	2021 –	

== See also ==
- Saint Michael: Roman Catholic traditions and views
