= Dye (disambiguation) =

A dye is a colored substance that bonds to a material.

Dye(s) may also refer to:

== People ==
- Dye (surname), people with the surname
- DyE, French musician

== Places in the United States ==
- Dye, Missouri
- Dyes Fork, a stream in Ohio

== Other uses ==
- Coin dye or die, one of the two metallic pieces used to strike a coin
- Dye (EP), an EP by Got7
- DYE Precision, a manufacturer of paintball equipment

== People with the given name ==
- Joan Dye Gussow (born 1928), American food writer

== See also ==
- Die (disambiguation)
- Dy (disambiguation)
- Russo–Dye
