= Deputy (disambiguation) =

Deputy or depute may refer to:

- Steward (office)
- Khalifa, an Arabic title that can signify "deputy"
- Deputy (legislator), a legislator in many countries and regions, including:
  - A member of a Chamber of Deputies, for example in Italy, Spain, Argentina, or Brazil.
  - A member of the Dáil Éireann (lower house of the Oireachtas).
  - A member of a National Assembly, as in Azerbaijan, Bulgaria, Congo-Brazzaville, Congo-Kinshasa, Costa Rica, France, Pakistan, Poland or Quebec.
  - A member of the Parliament, as in Kazakhstan and Lebanon.
  - A member of the States of Guernsey or the States of Jersey elected by a parish or district
  - Deputy (Acadian), a position in 18th-century Nova Scotia, Canada
- Deputy Führer, a title for the deputy head of the Nazi Party
- A subordinate
  - Deputy premier, a subordinate of the Premier and next-in-command in the cabinet of the Soviet Union and its successor countries, including:
    - First Deputy Premier of the Soviet Union
    - Deputy Premier of the Soviet Union, a subordinate of the Premier and the First Deputy Premier and third-in-command of the Soviet Government
  - Deputy Prime Minister of the United Kingdom
  - Deputy sheriff, deputized by a sheriff to perform the same duties as the sheriff
  - Deputy Director of the Central Intelligence Agency
  - White House Deputy Chief of Staff
  - Deputy marriage commissioner
  - Deputy governor
  - Deputy mayor
  - Deputy overman (pit deputy) in a mine
  - Deputy Speaker, in a legislative assembly

== Film, theatre and television ==
- Deputy (TV series), American police drama starring Stephen Dorff
- The Deputy, US title of The Representative, a play by Rolf Hochhuth
- The Deputy (TV series), American western television series with Henry Fonda
- The Deputy (film), 2004 BBC political comedy with Jack Dee

== Other uses ==
- Deputy, Indiana, a small town in the United States
- Deputy Dawg, a Terrytoons cartoon character

== See also ==
- People's Deputy (disambiguation)
- Deputy lieutenant
