= Proeung =

Proeung (Khmer: ព្រឿង) is a Khmer name. Notable people with the name include:

- Pho Proeung (1903–1975), Prime Minister of Cambodia from 1960 to 1961
- Dy Proeung (born 1930s), Cambodian architect
