= Bishop of Bathurst =

Bishop of Bathurst may refer to:

== Anglican ==
- Anglican Bishop of Bathurst, of the Anglican Diocese of Bathurst in the Anglican Church of Australia

== Roman Catholic ==
- Roman Catholic Bishop of Bathurst (Australia), of the Roman Catholic Diocese of Bathurst in New South Wales, Australia
- Roman Catholic Bishop of Bathurst (Canada), of the Roman Catholic Diocese of Bathurst in New Brunswick, Canada
