= Dy (surname) =

Origin
- Region of origin: Cambodia, Philippines

Dy is a surname in Cambodia and the Philippines.

== Origins ==
As an English surname, Dy is a variant spelling of Dye, which may have come from the Greek masculine given name Dionysios or its feminine form Dionysia. One early record of the surname Dy is in the 1379 poll tax returns of Yorkshire. Another known origin of the surname is from the Chinese Filipino community, where Dy transcribes a Hokkien pronunciation of the Chinese surname spelled Lǐ (李) in the Hanyu Pinyin transcription of its Mandarin pronunciation. There is also a Khmer surname transcribed as Dy (ឌី, Di).

== Statistics ==
The 2010 United States census found 1,932 people with the surname Dy, making it the 15,232nd-most-common name in the country. This represented an increase from 1,422 (18,077th-most-common) in the 2000 census. In both censuses, slightly less than nine-tenths of the bearers of the surname identified as Asian, and about five percent as White.

== People ==
- Tomas Dy-Liacco (1920–2019), Filipino-American electrical engineer
- Dy Proeung (ឌី ព្រឿង; born 1930s), Cambodian architect
- Pauline Dy Phon (ឌី ផុន; 1933–2010), Cambodian botanist at the National Museum of Natural History in France
- Dy Saveth (ឌី សាវ៉េត; born 1944), Cambodian actress and the first Miss Cambodia (1959)
- Benjamin Dy (1952–2013), Filipino politician
- Bojie Dy (born 1961), Filipino politician
- Faustino Dy (1925–2013), Filipino politician
- Luane Dy (born 1986), Filipino television personality
- Denise Dy (born 1989), Filipino tennis player
- Ian Paul Dy (born 1981), Filipino politician
- Inno Dy (born 1991), Filipino politician
- Jason Dy (born 1990), Filipino singer
- Mike Dy III (born 1979), Filipino politician
- Rolando Dy (born 1990), Filipino mixed martial artist
- Kim Kianna Dy (born 1995), Filipino volleyball player
- Philbert Dy, Filipino film critic

== See also ==
- Di (surname)
- DY (rapper)
