= Deputy (Acadian) =

The Acadian Deputy was a position in 18th-century Nova Scotia, Canada, created by the Nova Scotia Council to represent the interests of an Acadian community to the council.

== Function ==
The deputy was more than a spokesperson for the community, being much like justices of the peace, sometimes fulfilling the duty of collecting quit-rents. Like justices of the peace, deputies drew much of their authority from the willingness of the community to accept that authority.

The first deputies were six men, elected in the Annapolis Royal region in 1720. The number of deputies grew to 24 by the end of the decade, including four each for Minas, Pisique, and Cobequid. Beamish Murdoch's A History of Nova Scotia described the deputy's duties:

12 April 1721, on the representation of Charles Robicheau, deputy of Cobequid, the number of deputies from that district was increased from one to four, (one only being required to attend on the governor.) At the same time the number of deputies from Mines was increased from three to twelve, (three only of them being bound to attend on the governor.) These deputies were to be annually chosen by the inhabitants, subject to the governor's approval. Their duties were to receive and put in execution the orders of the governor, and to report the names of persons disobedient. Their expenses in coming and going were to be defrayed by the inhabitants.

The role of the Acadian Deputy evolved under British rule after 1710.

== Major decisions ==
=== Refusing an Unconditional Oath (1727) ===
In September 1727, Deputies Charles Landry, Abraham Bourg and Guillaum Bourgois were committed to prison for refusing to take the Oath of Office without conditions, primarily the right to not be pressed into military service against the French or Mi'kmaq, as well as freedom to practice their religion and keep their lands.

The Deputies were "laid in irons" as "Ringleaders" and found guilty of "Several enormous Crimes in assembling the Inhabitants in a riotous manner contrary to the orders of the Governmt both as to time & place & likewise in framing a Rebellious paper". Francis Richards was also imprisoned for taking the Oath once then retracting. Instead of complying with orders, the Deputies had assembled the inhabitants and "frightened and terrified them, by representing the Oath so strong and binding that neither they nor their children should ever shake off the yoke, so that by their example and insinuations the whole body of the people almost to a man refused them, but upon certain conditions set forth in a paper"

In response, the other unruly inhabitants were prohibited from any fishing activity and denied the security and privileges of English subjects. Abraham Bourg was released due to his "great age" and ordered to quit the Province, leaving his effects. Guillaum Bourgois was later released on bail.

Landry fell ill while in the fort stockade and was "Reported to be in a very Dangerous State of health & likely to dye Without Some Indulgence from the Government". His wife petitioned to have him released, to tend to his illness, after giving a guarantee of his return to finish his sentence. It was "Voted That the Prisoner Landry in regard of his being a very Great Offender & Incapable to give sufficient Bail shall not be suffered to go out of the Garrison"

Charles Landry died on November 5, 1727, less than two months after his arrest at about the age of 39 on November 5, 1727. There is no indication he was released from the Garrison before his death. He was the brother in-law of future Partisan Joseph Broussard and caretaker for Joseph's disputed illegitimate child. "One suspects that the Broussard brothers, probably still living on the haute rivière above Annapolis, kept the untimely death of their brother-in-law in mind when they removed themselves & their families to Chepoudy" and later towards the Petitcodiac River settlement; which came to be known as a refuge for rebels and an area of fierce resistance.

The Oath of Allegiance was signed by more than 600 Acadians from "Mines, Cobequit, Piziquid & Beaubassin" in April, 1730. This was the conditional oath sought, where verbal and written (in the margin) concessions were made, which were later not recognized by the Governor and Council.

For the Refusal of the Oath, Acadians are looked back on as "premature republicans – a little too early for their own good".

=== Refusing an Unconditional Oath (1749) ===
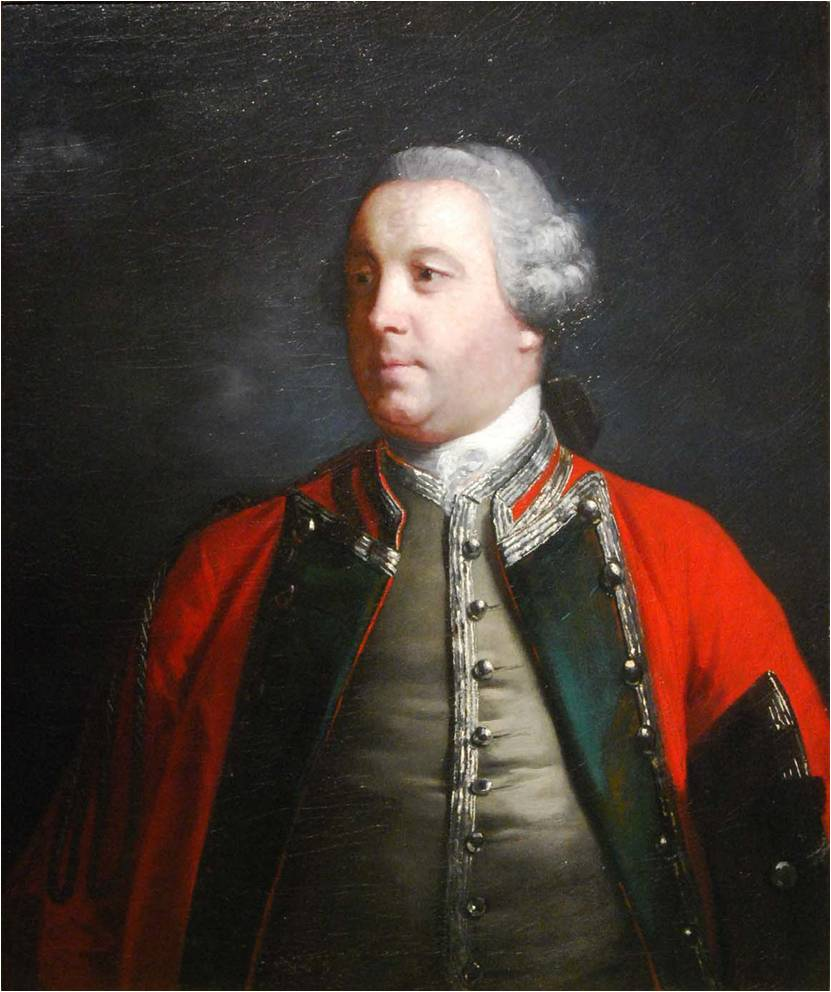
Edward Cornwallis - established the Nova Scotia Council at Halifax (1749)

Edward Cornwallis was appointed as the Governor of Nova Scotia in 1749. Amongst the first acts of this government was an audience of the three French Deputies, who had come to meet the new Governor. They were Jean Melanson, from Canard River; Claude LeBlanc, from Grand Pré, and Philip Melanson from Pisiquid.

Cornwallis had examined the conditional Oath sworn by the Acadians in 1730 and ruled that the concessions were an error and unwarranted. He refused to recognise their allegiance, and insisted the Acadians were to sign a new Unconditional Oath.

Governor Cornwallis anticipated humble and cloying peasants, tugging at their caps. He was surprised to find subtle and assertive republicans. To his demand that the Acadians swear an unconditional oath, the inhabitants reiterated their long-held position. While they were willing to take another oath, they insisted on an explicit exemption from bearing arms. They argued that since this exemption had been endorsed by the king's representative in 1730, and it had been accepted as the ruling assumption of their civil life for nearly 20 years, the exemption had the force of law. "Acts proposed by the people", they asserted, "when they are approved by Royal authority, acquire a force which the king himself cannot take away from them". Consider the meaning of this remarkable statement; their neutrality was part of the customary law of l'Acadie or Nova Scotia and thus their identity was protected by the common law of Englishmen. It was a brilliant and original formulation. "It appears to me that you think yourselves independent", Cornwallis responded, "and you wish to treat with the King as if you were so."

On 29 July, o. s., (9 August, n. s.), 1749, the following deputies from the French districts arrived at Halifax.: Alexandre Hebert, from Annapolis; Joseph Dugas and Claude LeBlanc, from Grand Pré; Jean Melançon, from Riviere des Canards; Baptiste Gaillard, Pierre Landry, Pierre Gotrot, from Cobequid; Pierre Doucet from Chignecto; François Bourg and Alexandre Brossart, Chipodie.

In March 1750, Gerard, the priest of Cobequid, (now Truro), and the four deputies of that district, Jean Hebert, Jean Bourg, Joseph Robichaux, and Pierre Gautrot, were examined by the governor and council, in regards to the stopping of the courier Pierre au Coin, who carried the governor's letters, as well as to de Loutre's having been there that winter, and to the non-attendance of the deputies at Halifax. Bourg was released, the rest detained.

This refusal and subsequent fallout is a mainstay in the development of an Acadian identity; as "Residents of the British colonies of North America were years away from declaring their rights as republicans yet here were the Acadians standing before British governors and making the case for similar rights" and that "the rights for which they were arguing were not that different from the rights ordinary British colonists would assert in the 1760s and 1770s."

=== Acadian Exodus (1750) ===
In April 1750 the French deputies – Jacques Teriot, of Grand Pré, Frangois Granger, of Riviere de Canard, Baptiste Galerne and Jean Andre, of Piziquid – petitioned, on behalf of the French inhabitants, for leave to evacuate the province, and to carry off their effects.

=== Acceptance of an Unconditional Oath (1759) ===
On November 16, 1759, Alexandre Brussard, Simon Martin, Jean Bass and Joseph Brussard, came with a flag of truce to Fort Cumberland, (Beausejour), as deputies for about 190 French Acadians residing at Petitcoudiac and Memramcook. The following day, three more Deputies – Pierre Suretz (Pierre II Surette), Jean Burk, and Michel Burk – arrived at the Fort Cumberland under a flag of truce, as deputies for 700 persons resident at Miramichi, Richibucto and Buctouche.

Many Acadians were allowed to return to the province after the Seven Years' War, on condition of signing the Unconditional Oath and having lost possession of their property and lands. Some prisoners did not sign the Oath, but rather opted to be deported to Louisiana where they became known as "Cajuns". Joseph Brussard and many others did not stay, and Alexandre Brussard was left as collateral for their return. Joseph Broussard did not surrender until 1762, after fierce resistance, with acts of piracy, cattle theft and involvement in multiple battles and engagements throughout the war; the Broussards did not sign Oaths and instead led the Acadian people to Louisiana in 1764–65.

It is noted that "further to remark to Your Excellency that none of the Acadians have ever made voluntary Submission, but on the contrary, their wants and Terrors only have reduced them to it". Many of these instances infuriated the Captains of Forts, as most were feigned surrenders to survive the winter and steal food, resources or ships.

Most Acadians who had escaped the deportation and subsequently fought in the resistance were captured after the Battle of Restigouche and lived as "banditti" and "ruffians turned pirates" on the fringes of remote parts of New Brunswick and Nova Scotia until captured by Captain Roderick McKenzie, some that remained or returned clandestinely did not sign Oaths until the 1800s, after the American Revolution, as a by-product of acquiring land legally.

== Deputies ==
In 1720, six French Representatives were chosen by the inhabitants as Deputies. Prudent Robicheaux (Robichaud), Alexander Robicheaux, Nicholas Gautier, Bernard Godets, Charles Landry, and Pier Godete were elected. Prudent Robicheaux and Nicholas Gautier were denied by Council. Deputies of the Annapolis River region were chosen by the Acadians and approved by the English, in May, 1720; "whose duties it should be to promulgate the orders and proclamations of the government, and to see that their [English] directions were carried into execution."

In 1725, Charles Landry was a deputy.

In 1727, three deputies were Abraham Bourg, Charles Landry & Guillaume Bourgois.

In 1732, Nicholas Gautier, was one of the deputes.

In 1736 Joseph Godin and his brother-in-law, Michel Bergeron d'Amboise, went as deputies from the Saint John Acadians to the Annapolis Royal Council.

In 1736, Alexandre and Joseph Broussard were chosen as de facto Deputies to execute legal summons on behalf of the Governor as there were no Deputies in the Chippody (Chipoudy, Shepody) area.

In 1742, the two deputies of Grand Pré were Bujean and Bourg.

In 1745, Louis Robichaux (Robichau, Robeshaw) was a deputy for Annapolis.

In 1745, Jean Terriot and Jean Potier were deputies from Chignecto.

In 1748, the deputies in Piziquid were Abraham Landry and Jean Chienne; in Grand Pré there was Bern. Diagre, Mich'l LeBlanc, Fras. Boudrot and Paul Oquine; in River Canard there was John Terroit, Oliver Deglass, Jean Granger and Michael Richard.

In 1748, On the 18 October, o. s., the old and new deputies of Grand Pré presented themselves, before the governor and council at Annapolis. They had divided Grand Pré into districts, which was approved of; but as they had elected Martin au Coin, whose brother Paul was a known opponent of the government, and he suspected. The choice was annulled, and they were ordered to elect another in his place.
