= Maritime Peninsula =

Coordinates: 46°30′N 66°0′W

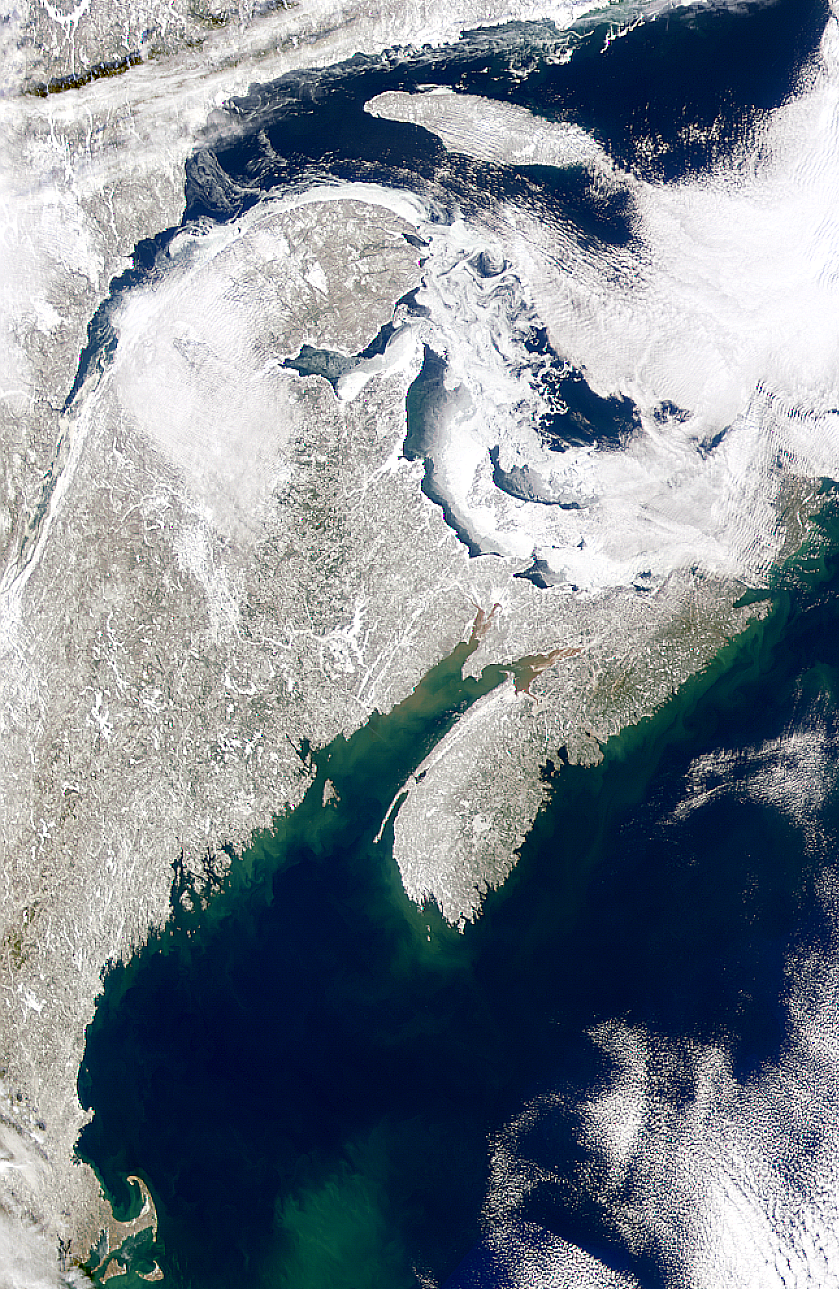
The Maritime Peninsula in winter

The Maritime Peninsula is a region of eastern North America that extends from the Kennebec River in the U.S. state of Maine northeast to the Maritime provinces of Canada (New Brunswick, Prince Edward Island, and Nova Scotia) and Quebec's Gaspé Peninsula. It is bounded by the Gulf of St. Lawrence to the north and the Gulf of Maine to the south.

The region has been inhabited for about 11,000 years, beginning in the Paleo-Indian period. Contact between native populations and Europeans occurred as early as 1600 in the Gulf of St. Lawrence. Indigenous peoples at the time of European contact included the ancestors of the modern St. Francis (Odanak), Penobscot, Passamaquoddy, Maliseet, and Miꞌkmaq peoples, along with other Algonquian speakers referred to by French explorers as Abenaki, Etchemin, and Souriquois.

The French colony of Acadia occupied roughly the same area.

== See also ==
- British colonization of the Americas
- French colonization of the Americas
- Indigenous peoples in Canada
