= YD =

YD, or Yd may refer to:

- Yard (yd), a unit of length
- Nissan YD engine, an automobile engine
- Yarmouth–Dennis Red Sox, or Y-D Red Sox, a collegiate summer baseball team based in South Yarmouth, Massachusetts
- Younger Dryas, a geological period from c. 12,900 to c. 11,700 calendar years ago
- South Yemen (ISO 3166-1 code YD)
- A US Navy hull classification symbol: Floating derrick (YD)
- YD - Young Diem / Early Day
- Yd. (retailer), an Australia and New Zealand clothing retail chain
