= Conseil de fabrique =

Group of people in a Catholic parish

In a Catholic parish, until 1905 in France, the conseil de fabrique was a group of people (clerics and lay people) responsible for collecting and administering the funds and income needed to build and maintain the parish's religious buildings and furnishings, such as churches, chapels, silverware, lighting fixtures, and ornaments. The fabrique's income came from collections, offerings, donations in kind, rents and leases, bequests and the rental of pews in the church.

== History ==
Since the Council of Trent (1545–1563), the term "Fabrique d'Église" has been used to designate an assembly of clerics to whom lay people have been added, charged with administering the property of the parish community.

Members of the conseil de fabrique (or "general", then "political body") are administrators known more specifically as "churchwarden" or "fabriciens".

== Fabriques by territory ==
=== France ===
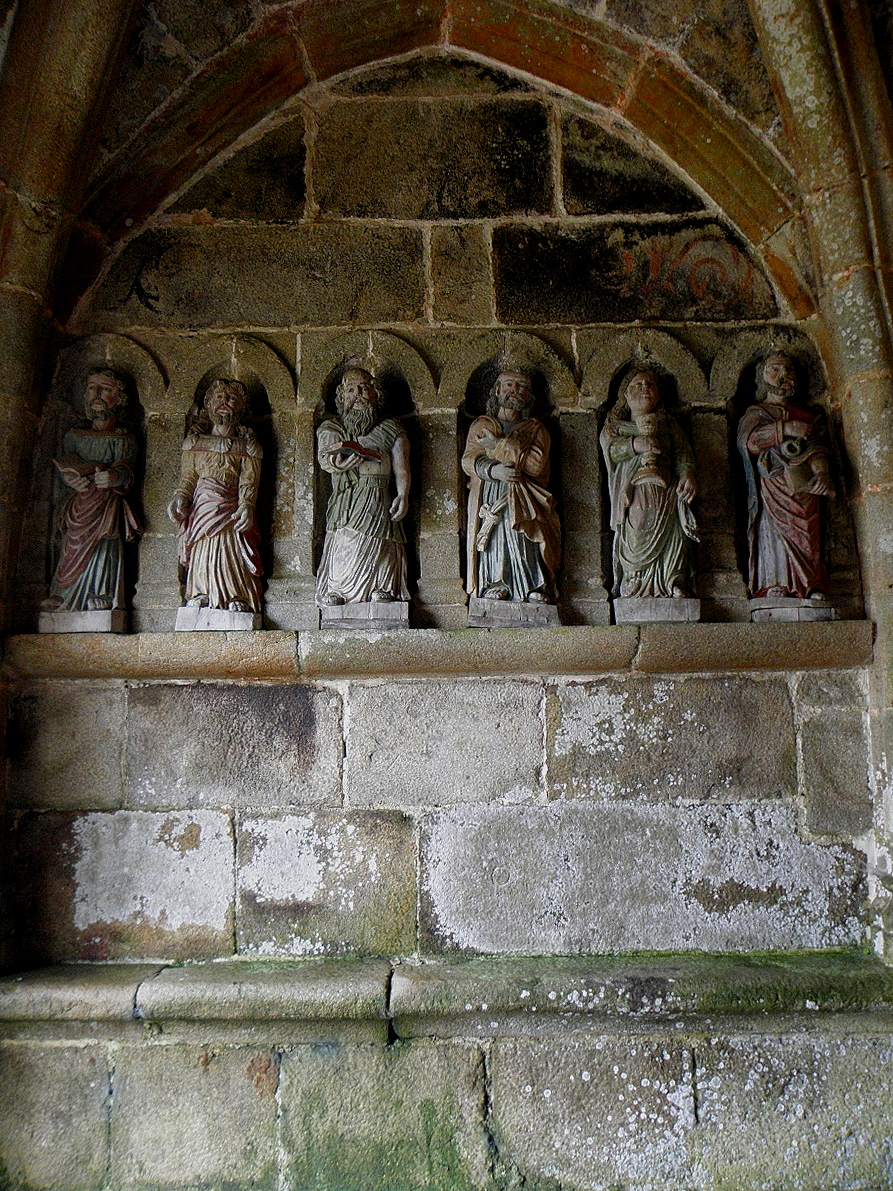
In Brittany, factory council members frequently met on the pew in the church porch, beneath the statues of the Apostles.

==== Ancien Régime ====
Under the Ancien régime in France, parishes were governed in two ways: spiritually and temporally:

The first consisted in the celebration of divine service, the administration of the sacraments, preaching, instruction and burial ceremonies. This is entrusted to the parish priest appointed by the bishop to lead the people of a parish. The temporal government is concerned with the administration of the fabrique's assets and revenues, repairs to the church, the supply of ornaments, books and sacred vessels, and everything else necessary for the celebration of divine service. This government is entrusted to the parish general.

The "general" was originally made up of all parishioners, as certain charters such as that of Beauport Abbey or the Redon Cartulary seem to indicate. However, in Brittany in particular, by the seventeenth and eighteenth centuries, it was already well-established practice for the conseil de fabrique to be made up of "the healthiest [wealthiest] part of the parishioners". In 1688, for example, the Parlement de Bretagne set the number of deliberators at twelve. From then on, the conseil de fabrique was referred to as a "political body".

Parish government was thus shared between the nobles (who enjoyed the right of pre-eminence) and their representatives: seneschal, Fiscal Procurator, the parish priest and other members of the parish clergy (vicar[s], choir priests, i.e. other ecclesiastics who could be numerous, often five to ten, sometimes as many as twenty) and the members of the conseil de fabrique, who elected two fabriciens or churchwarden to administer the parish. The "general" usually meets in the church porch, also known as the chapitreau, but sometimes in the sacristy, in the church itself or in an adjoining room. It manages the income from bequests, offerings and alms, both in money and in kind, pays the cantors and choir priests, and provides for the upkeep of the church; the decimator parish priest (whose main source of income is tithes) finances the cost of religious services and the upkeep of his vicars.

After mass on Sundays, the parishioners gathered to form the parish "general", who discussed all material matters and settled collective interests, including those relating to communal property. Any man owning property is a member of this assembly. It is made up of all those who are taxable, the landowners. It appoints a land attorney to implement decisions and act on behalf of the community.

=== From the Revolution to the Law of Separation ===
The decree of 2 November 1789 placed ecclesiastical property at the disposal of the Nation.

The decree of 20 April 1790, which entrusted the administration of property placed at the Nation's disposal to departmental or district administrations, specified that, by way of derogation, fabriques would continue to be administered as before (by the conseils de fabrique).

Shortly afterwards, the decree of 3 November 1793 (13 Brumaire an II) declared all fabriques' assets to be national property. The Concordat, signed by the Pope and the First Consul, re-established the fabriques.

Recognized as a State law on 8 April 1802, it was supplemented on the same day by the "organic articles", article 76 of which stated that "Fabriques will be established to oversee the maintenance and conservation of temples, and the administration of alms".

The decree of 30 December 1809, organized the operation of fabriques in each parish. They became public establishments of worship until 1905. The fabrique council comprised the parish priest, the mayor and between five and nine elected members.

The law of 28 December 1904, removed the fabriques and consistories and gave the communes a monopoly on funeral arrangements.

The 1905 law separating Church and State abolished the fabriques. The law provided for the creation, at commune level, of religious associations of the faithful, to provide for the costs, upkeep and public exercise of worship. These associations would be entrusted with the nation's religious buildings and the portion of fabriques' assets used exclusively for worship. The Catholic Church refused to create the religious associations provided for in the 1905 law.

It was not until 1924 and the agreement on diocesan associations that the situation was unblocked.

=== Alsace-Moselle ===
In 1905, when the law on the Separation of church and state was passed, the departments of Moselle, Haut-Rhin and Bas-Rhin were part of the German Empire and therefore unaffected by these legislative provisions. The French concordat regime remained in force after the return of these departments to France.

Challenged when annexed by the German administration in 1940, factory councils were re-established in 1944, with a few modifications introduced over time by the decrees of 18 March 1992, 21 May 1997, and 10 January 2001.

=== Belgium ===
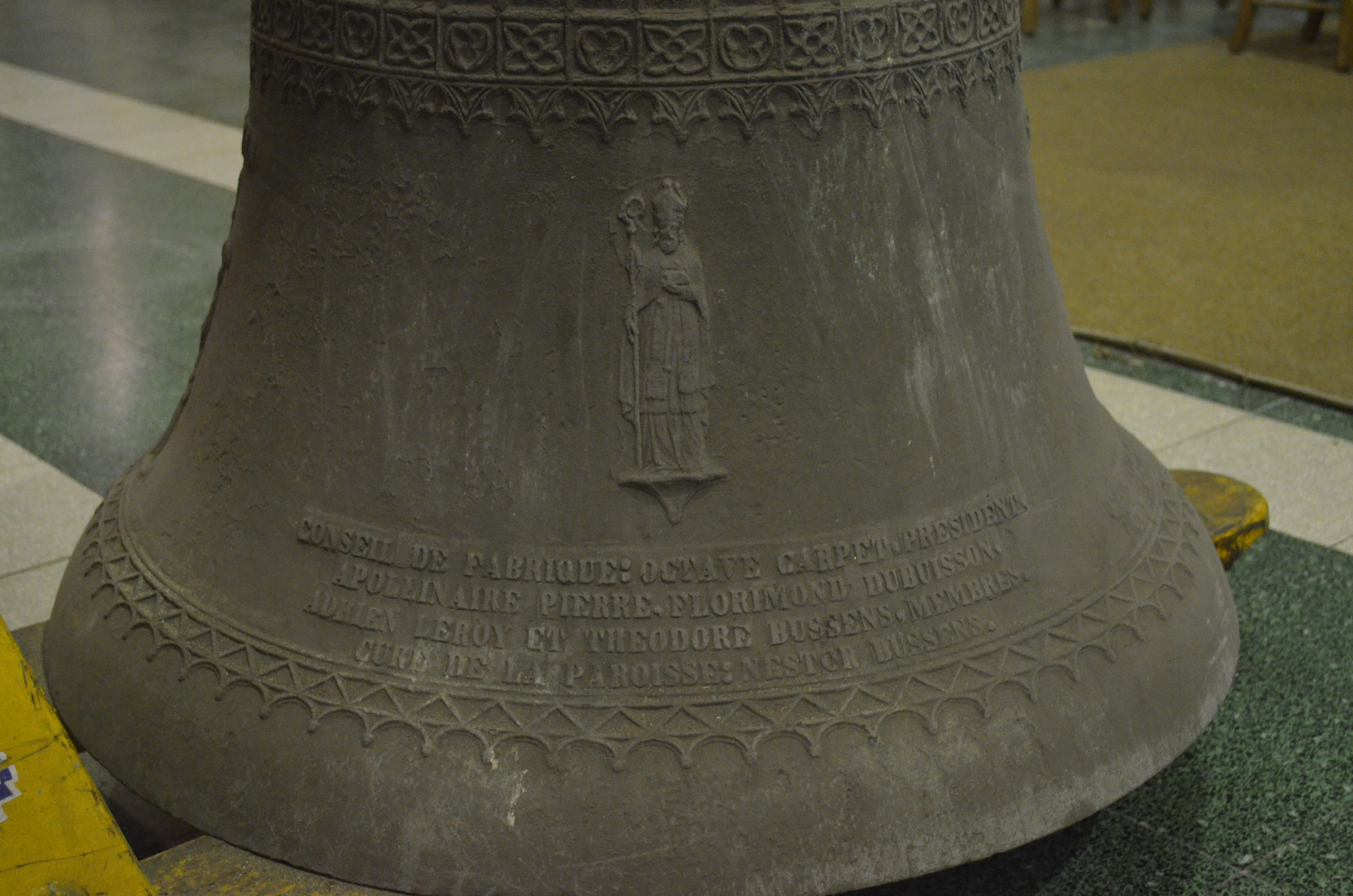
Members of the Conseil de fabrique pictured on an 1897 bell from Saint-Joseph church in Charleroi.

In Belgium, "fabriques d'église" – the term used for the Roman Catholic and Orthodox faiths (names vary for other faiths) – were created by provisions inherited from the Napoleonic regime (Concordat of 1801, imperial decree of 30 December 1809), by the communal law passed in 1836 and the "Temporel des cultes" law of 1870. The law decreed that "fabriques are public establishments responsible for administering property assigned to public service, which is neither communal nor provincial. The functions of the members of the fabriques (called fabriciens) and of the boards of directors are not remunerated". Under the law, communes are responsible for the upkeep of Catholic, Protestant, Jewish and Anglican religious buildings located in their territory (art. 255, 9° of the Communal Law), and for the costs associated with worship (for example, in the case of a Catholic Church, altar bread, wine, lighting, heating, cleaning, the purchase and laundering of linen and the purchase of furniture). The commune must also cover the accommodation costs of ministers of religion (art. 255, 12°). The same provisions apply to the Islamic and Orthodox faiths recognized in 1974 and 1985 respectively; however, these communities are funded by the provinces and not by the communes. Finally, the provincial law, also passed in 1836, makes similar provisions for the financing of cathedrals, episcopal palaces and diocesan seminaries (art. 69). This provision of the provincial law was replaced in the Walloon Region by article 42 of the decree of 12 February 2004.

The conseil de fabrique is made up of the burgomaster (who must, however, be replaced by a local councillor who is a Catholic), the parish priest and five parishioners for parishes of less than five thousand souls, and nine for larger parishes; the council elects a president and a secretary.

== See also ==
- Churchwarden
- Religion in Belgium
