= Diocese of Bathurst (Canada) =

Catholic ecclesiastical territory

Diocese of Bathurst Dioecesis Bathurstensis in Canada Diocèse de Bathurst
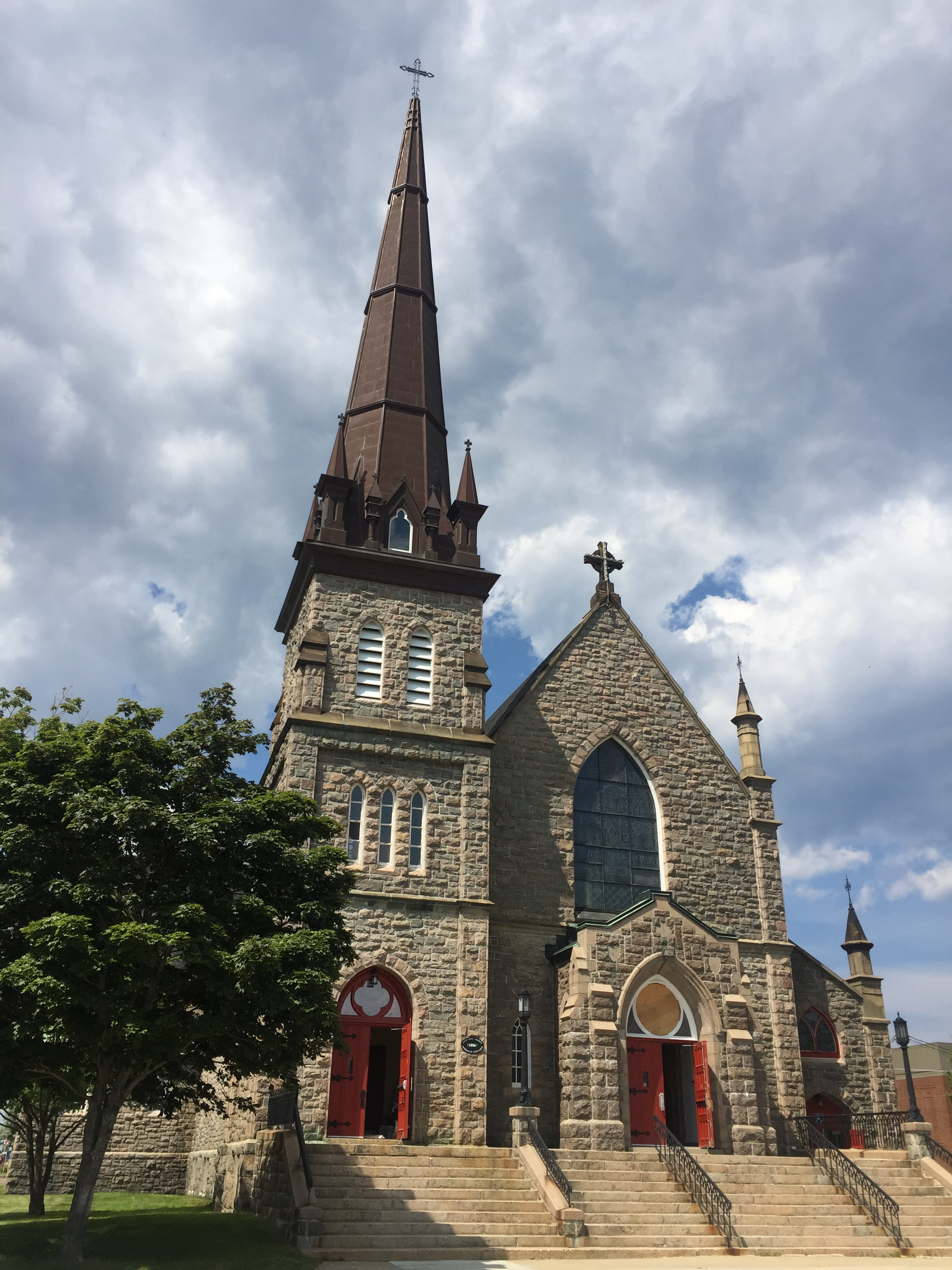
- Sacred Heart Cathedral, New Brunswick

- Coat of arms

Location
- Country: Canada
- Ecclesiastical province: Moncton
- Coordinates: 47.6179°N 65.6554°W

Statistics
- Area: 18,770 km^{2} (7,250 sq mi)
- Population: Total; Catholics: (as of 2022); ▼99,751; ▼89,062 (▼89.3%)
- Parishes: 56

Information
- Denomination: Catholic Church
- Sui iuris church: Latin Church
- Rite: Roman Rite
- Established: May 8, 1860; 166 years ago
- Cathedral: Sacred Heart Cathedral
- Secular priests: 27 (24 Diocesan, 3 Religious Orders)

Current leadership
- Pope: Leo XIV
- Bishop: Michel Proulx, O.Praem
- Metropolitan Archbishop: Guy Desrochers, C.Ss.R.

Website
- diocesebathurst.com

The Diocese of Bathurst (originally Diocese of Chatham) (Latin: Dioecesis Bathurstensis in Canada) is a Roman Catholic suffragan of the Archdiocese of Moncton. It has its cathedral episcopal see, Sacred Heart Cathedral, in Bathurst, New Brunswick, Canada.

== History ==
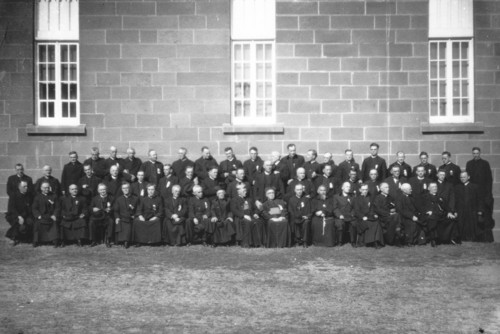
Clergy of the Diocese of Chatham in Caraquet in 1930 with bishop Patrice Alexandre Chiasson in the center

On 8 May, 1860, the Diocese of St. John was divided, creating the Diocese of Chatham. The diocese comprises the northern half of the Province of New Brunswick, including the counties of Gloucester, Madawaska, Northumberland, Restigouche, Victoria, and the part of Kent north of the Richibucto River. This territory formerly belonged to the Diocese of St. John, itself originally a portion of the Archdiocese of Quebec. James Rogers was appointed the first bishop and consecrated 15 August in the same year. On his arrival at Chatham, Bishop Rogers found only seven priests to attend an immense stretch of country. During his episcopate of forty-two years, the diocese greatly expanded; by the time he resigned on 7 August, 1902, he left a diocese of 47 parishes and 51 priests. On the resignation of Bishop Rogers, Thomas Francis Barry, consecrated titular Bishop of Thugga and Coadjutor of Chatham, on 7 August, 1902, succeeded to the See of Chatham.

The steady march of development, facility of communication, and immigration, required the formation of new parishes each year; by 1908 the diocese contained 57 churches with resident priests and 25 missions with churches. The Catholic population in 1908 numbered about 66,000; a large percentage of which is French Acadian by descent and language. At the time, the secular clergy numbered 65 priests, with 5 theological students, and the regular 31 priests and 7 brothers. Sisters, numbering about 200, of several religious congregations, were in charge of various institutions. There were 8 parochial schools with about 1000 pupils, one classical college (at Caraquet) for boys, directed by the Eudist Fathers, with 130 pupils, and 3 schools taught by Sisters under the Government School Law, with about 400 pupils. Two orphan asylums supported 100 orphans, and 4 hospitals are directed by the Hospital Sisters of St. Joseph, among them the government hospital for lepers at Tracadie. The Trappist Fathers and the Trappistine Sisters, expelled from France, have opened monasteries in the parish of Rogersville.

Bishop Thomas Barry served as Bishop of Chatham until 1920, when he was succeeded by Patrice Chiasson, who moved the see to the francophone settlement of Bathurst. The diocese was renamed as such in 1938, before

The next appointment in 1920 was a French speaker. By this time the French were in a majority in the diocese, and Bishop Patrice Chiasson decided to move his headquarters to Bathurst, a majority French-speaking area. The move was complete in 1938 and it was renamed on 13 March 1938.

=== Territorial losses ===
Year	Along with	To form
1936	Diocese of Saint John, New Brunswick	Archdiocese of Moncton
1944		Diocese of Edmundston

== Bishops ==
=== Bishops of the diocese ===
- James Rogers (8 May 1860 – 7 Aug 1902), resigned
- Thomas Francis Barry (7 Aug 1902 – 19 Jan 1920)
- Patrice Alexandre Chiasson, C.I.M. (9 Sep 1920 – 31 Jan 1942)
- Camille-André Le Blanc (25 Jul 1942 – 8 Jan 1969), resigned
- Edgar Godin (9 Jun 1969 – 6 Apr 1985)
- Arsène Richard (15 Nov 1985 – 6 Jan 1989)
- André Richard, C.S.C. (20 May 1989 – 16 Mar 2002), appointed Archbishop of Moncton, New Brunswick
- Valéry Vienneau (3 Jul 2002 – 15 Jun 2012), appointed Archbishop of Moncton, New Brunswick
- Daniel Jodoin (22 Jan 2013 – 18 Oct 2022), appointed, Bishop of Nicolet, Québec
- Michel Proulx, O.Praem (28 Oct 2023 – Present)

=== Coadjutor bishop ===
- Thomas Francis Barry (1899-1902), became Bishop here

=== Auxiliary bishop ===
- Louis James O'Leary (1914-1920), appointed Bishop of Charlottetown, Prince Edward Island

=== Other priests of this diocese who became bishops ===
- Henry Joseph O'Leary (1901-1913), appointed Bishop of Charlottetown, Prince Edward Island
- Louis-Joseph-Arthur Melanson (1905-1932), appointed Bishop of Gravelbourg, Saskatchewan
- Norbert Robichaud (1931-1936), appointed Archbishop of Moncton, New Brunswick
- Donat Chiasson (1956-1972), appointed Archbishop of Moncton, New Brunswick
- Joseph Edward Troy (1959-1984), appointed Coadjutor Bishop of Saint John, New Brunswick

== External links and references ==
- Roman Catholic Diocese of Bathurst site
- GigaCatholic, with incumbent biographies
- First Catholic Bishop of Bathurst Accessed October 17, 2012
- "Diocese of Bathurst". Catholic-Hierarchy.
- Bathurst School Controversy in 1860s Accessed October 17, 2012
