= Archdiocese of Moncton =

Catholic ecclesiastical territory

Coordinates: 46.0909°N 64.7819°W

Archdiocese of Moncton Archidioecesis Monctonensis Archidiocèse de Moncton
- Coat of arms

Location
- Country: Canada
- Ecclesiastical province: Moncton

Statistics
- Area: 12,000 km^{2} (4,600 sq mi)
- Population: (as of 2004); 108,000 (51.8%)
- Parishes: 48

Information
- Denomination: Catholic
- Sui iuris church: Latin Church
- Rite: Roman Rite
- Established: 1936
- Cathedral: Our Lady of the Assumption Cathedral
- Secular priests: 44

Current leadership
- Pope: Leo XIV
- Bishop: Guy Desrochers CSsR
- Bishops emeritus: André Richard; Ernest Léger; Valéry Vienneau

Website
- diocesemoncton.ca

The Roman Catholic Archdiocese of Moncton (Latin: Archidioecesis Monctonensis) is a Roman Catholic archdiocese that includes part of the Province of New Brunswick.

The cathedra of the Archbishop of Moncton is at Our Lady of the Assumption Cathedral (French: Cathédrale Notre-Dame de l’Assomption) in Moncton, New Brunswick. Suffragan dioceses of the Archdiocese of Moncton are Bathurst in Canada, Edmundston, and Saint John, New Brunswick.

On Friday, June 15, 2012, Pope Benedict XVI accepted the resignation from the governance of the Archdiocese of Moncton presented by Archbishop André Richard, C.S.C., in accordance with canon 401 § 1 of the 1983 Code of Canon Law, and appointed Bishop Valéry Vienneau to succeed Archbishop Emeritus Richard; Archbishop-elect Vienneau until his appointment had been the Bishop of the Roman Catholic Diocese of Bathurst, a suffragan diocese of the Archdiocese based in the city of Bathurst, New Brunswick.

As of 2004, the archdiocese contained 48 parishes, 44 active diocesan priests, 26 religious priests, and 108,000 Catholics. It also had 291 Women Religious, 47 Religious Brothers, and 1 permanent deacon.

== Bishops ==
The following is a list of the bishops and archbishops of Moncton and their terms of service:

- Louis-Joseph-Arthur Melanson (1936–1941)
- Norbert Robichaud (1942–1972)
- Donat Chiasson (1972–1995)
- Ernest Léger (1996–2002)
- André Richard (2002–2012)
- Valéry Vienneau (2012–2023)
- Guy Desrochers (since 2023)

=== Other priests of this diocese who became bishops ===
- Albini LeBlanc, appointed Bishop of Hearst, Ontario in 1940
- Daniel Joseph Bohan, appointed Auxiliary Bishop of Toronto, Ontario in 2003
