= Dyes Fork =

Stream in Ohio, U.S.

Coordinates: 39°37′48″N 81°43′12″W

Dyes Fork is a stream in the U.S. state of Ohio. It was named for the Dye family, which settled in the area in 1806.

== See also ==
- List of rivers of Ohio
