= James Rogers (bishop) =

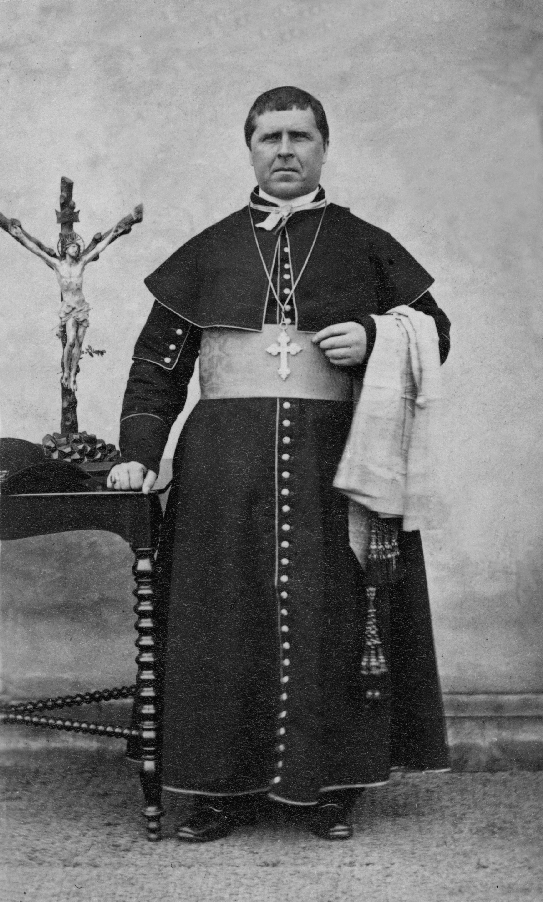
- Rogers in 1868
- Diocese: Roman Catholic Diocese of Chatham
- Appointed: 15 August 1860
- Retired: 7 August 1902

Orders
- Ordination: 12 July 1951

Personal details
- Born: 11 July 1826 Mountcharles, United Kingdom of Great Britain and Ireland
- Died: 22 March 1903 (aged 76) Chatham, New Brunswick, Dominion of Canada
- Denomination: Catholic

James Rogers (11 July 1826 – 22 March 1903) was an Irish-Canadian priest who was the bishop of Roman Catholic Diocese of Chatham. Born in Mountcharles, Ireland, he immigrated to Nova Scotia alongside his parents in 1931. His father, John Rogers, was a sickly man; James, an only child, became the primary income earner for his family when he was in his teenage years.

Rogers entered the seminary in 1847, following John's death, and was ordained a priest on 2 July 1851. To the surprise of many of his contemporaries, he became the first bishop of the Roman Catholic Diocese of Chatham at age 33 on 15 August 1860, when he was consecrated bishop in Charlottetown. On his arrival at Chatham, Rogers found only seven priests to attend an immense stretch of country. During his episcopate of forty-two years, the diocese substantially grew, and when he resigned, on 7 August 1902, he left a diocese of 47 parishes and 51 priests.

Bishop Rogers attended the First Vatican Council where he opposed the declaration of papal infallibility. He invited the Congregation of Notre Dame to open convents in Newcastle, Caraquet, and Saint-Louis de Kent.
