= Joseph Godin =

Deputy (Acadian)
- In office 1736–1742
- Monarch: Louis XIII
- Deputy: France
- Preceded by: Nicholas Gautier
- Succeeded by: Louis Robichaux

Personal details
- Born: c. 1695 Fredericton, New France
- Died: c. 1770 (aged c. 74) Cherbourg, Normandy, France
- Spouse: Marie Anne Bergeron (1709-1770)
- Children: 5+
- Parent: Gabriel Chatillon

Military service
- Allegiance: France
- Years of service: 1749-1759

Joseph Alexandre Godin, dit Beauséjour (c. 1696 - c. 1770) was an Acadian and the leader of the Acadian Militia in the Saint John River valley. A British officer described Godin as having "a man of some consequence and had a commission as Major of Militia." His home was at Sainte-Anne-du-Pays-Bas (present-day Fredericton).

== Early life ==
His father Gabriel Godin, dit Chatillon, a naval officer, was the second lieutenant at Fort Saint-Joseph (Fort Nashwaak) in 1692. His father was a trader with the Wabanaki Confederacy. Joseph worked with his father and eventually became the King's interpreter. As an Acadian deputy, he represented the Acadians from Saint John to the Nova Scotia Council in 1736.

In 1749, at the outbreak of Father Le Loutre’s War, Godin became the official leader of the Acadian militia on the Saint John River. They rebuffed the efforts of both John Gorham (1748) and John Rous (1749) to establish control of the river.

== St. John River Campaign ==
During the St. John River Campaign in February 1759, Acadian militia leader Joseph Godin dit Bellefontaine and a group of Acadians ambushed the Rangers. Eventually Godin and his militia was overwhelmed by Hazen's rangers. Godin resisted Hazen's efforts to get him to sign an oath of allegiance, even in the face of Hazen's torturing and killing some of Godin's family members in front of him. The Rangers scalped six Acadians and took six prisoners during this raid. Godin "by his speech and largess . . . had instigated and maintained the Indians in their hatred and war against the English." Godin was taken prisoner by the Rangers and brought, after having been joined by his family, to Annapolis Royal. From there he was taken to Boston, Halifax, and England; later he was sent to Cherbourg.

Godin's official statement to the French Crown states: "The Sieur Joseph [Godin] [Sieur de] Beauséjour of the Saint John River, son of Gabriel (officer aboard the king`s vessels in Canada (in Acadie) and of Angélique-Roberte Jeanna), was major of all the Saint John River Militia by order of Monsieur de la Galissonnière, from the 10 April 1749 and always was in these functions during the said war until he was captured by the enemy, and he owns several leagues of land, where he had the grief to have seen the massacre of one of his daughters and her three children by the English, who wanted, out of cruelty and fear to force him to take their part ... he only escaped such a fate by his flight into the woods, carrying with him two other children of the daughter." He and his wife spent the remainder of their lives in Cherbourg, Normandy, France where they received 300 French Livres of annual revenue as compensation

== See also ==
- Military history of the Acadians

== Notes ==
Joseph had a brother named Jacques Phillipe dit Bellefontaine Godin, they were married to sisters. Make sure to differentiate them.
