= People's Deputy =

People's Deputy may refer to:

- Member of the Congress of People's Deputies of the Soviet Union
- Member of the Congress of People's Deputies of Russia
- Member of the Verkhovna Rada of Ukraine
