= Guy Desrochers =

Canadian Roman Catholic Archbishop and Prelate

His Grace, The Most Reverend, Mons. Guy Desrochers CSsR
- Metropolitan Archbishop of Moncton
- Church: Catholic Church
- Province: Moncton
- Metropolis: Moncton
- See: Moncton
- Appointed: 8 July 2023
- Installed: 18 October 2023
- Predecessor: Valéry Vienneau
- Previous posts: Bishop of Alexandria-Cornwall (2018-2020); Bishop of Pembroke (2020-2023)

Orders
- Ordination: 7 January 1989 by Roger Ébacher
- Consecration: 22 February 2019 by Terrence Prendergast SJ

Personal details
- Born: Guy Desrochers; 23 May 1956 (age 70) Quebec, Canada
- Denomination: Catholic Church
- Occupation: Archbishop, Prelate
- Profession: Theologian, Philosopher
- Motto: Praedica Verbum (Preach the Word)
- Coat of arms

Guy Desrochers, C.Ss.R. (born on 23 May 1956) is a Canadian prelate for the Catholic Church. He was named Metropolitan Archbishop of Moncton in July 2023. Previously, he was Bishop of Pembroke from 2020 to 2023 after serving as Auxiliary Bishop in Alexandria-Cornwall from 2018 to 2020.
