= DY (rapper) =

Canadian rapper (1984–2010, disappeared)

- Born: Forrest Schab; 1984 (age 41–42); Vancouver, British Columbia, Canada
- Genres: rap
- Instrument: vocals
- Years active: 2009–2010
- Label: CP Records
- Disappeared: November 18, 2010 (aged 25–26); Mexico
- Status: Missing for 15 years, 9 months and 11 days

Forrest Schab, known by his stage name DY (born 1984), was a Canadian rapper raised in Vancouver, British Columbia. In 2009, he signed to CP Records.

== Biography ==
His stage name is an acronym deriving from his nickname Die Young. DY started making music independently at the age of 14 winning several emcee competitions and releasing solo material.

An album was in the making in cooperation with CP Record artist Belly. His first single "Passenger" featuring another CP Record artist Danny Fernandes was released in October 2009. Upon the release, he was featured on Billboard February 19, 2010 issue as one of the best emerging Canadian artists. A special remix version by DJ Jedi was also released.

== Disappearance ==
On November 18, 2010, DY was reported missing in Mexico. In mid-August 2010, Schab made plans to fly to Mexico and disappeared with no one hearing from him for months. Canadian police were investigating his whereabouts. On December 10, 2010, his family released another statement expressing their grave worry regarding DY's disappearance. Various media sources speculate his disappearance is related to drugs and links to organized crime.

Just prior to his disappearance, he shot a music video for his second single called "That's My Spot" featuring former Danity Kane member D. Woods, and his contract with CP Records was terminated. As of 2026, his fate and whereabouts remain unknown.

== Discography ==
=== Mixtapes ===
- 2003: Metaforezt Presents, Street Legal Vol. 1: Strickly 4 E.V.
- 2006: Metaforezt Presents, Street Legal Vol. 2: Canada’z Nitemare (Hosted by DJ Whoo Kid)
- 2009: Vancouver Gangland

=== Singles ===
- 2009: "Passenger" featuring Danny Fernandes
- 2010: "That's My Spot" featuring D. Woods

== See also ==
- List of people who disappeared
