= Dy Proeung =

Cambodian architect and sculptor

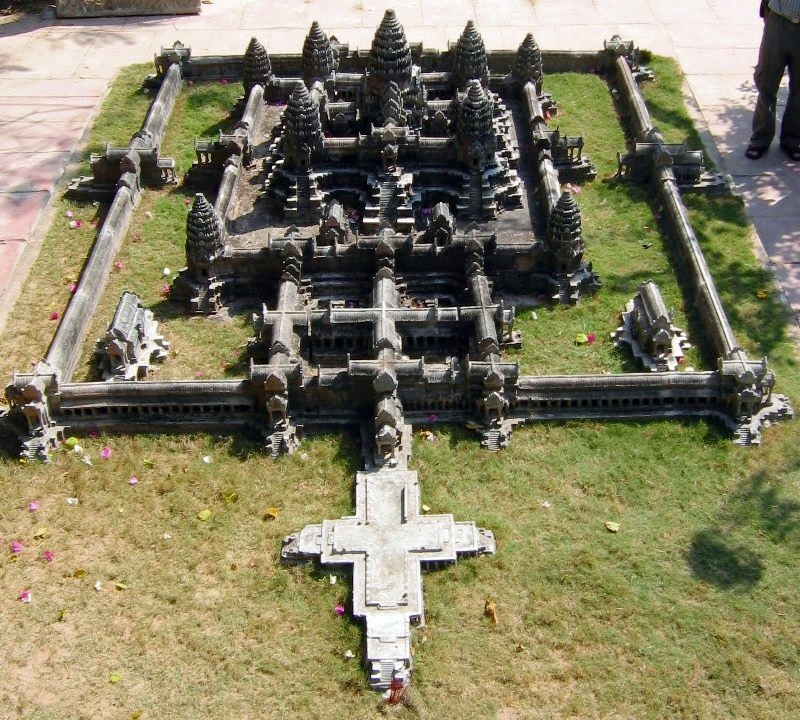
View of one of Proeung's models of Angkor Wat

Dy Proeung (Khmer: ឌី ព្រឿង; born 1930s) is a Cambodian architect and sculptor. He is notable for creating scaled-down models of Cambodian temples, most notably Angkor Wat. An article in Roads & Kingdoms once described Proeung as Cambodia's "Most diligent and heroic architect".

== Biography ==
Proeung was born in Cambodia (then part of French Indochina) in the 1930s. He grew up in Phnom Penh and was trained as a draftsman. After high-school he attended the Royal University of Fine Arts in Phnom Penh, graduating in 1960. During the 1960s, he worked for the Conservation d’Ankor, an organization that maintained and protected Cambodia's cultural sites. Proeung lived in Siem Reap, and assisted in making drawings of historic sites. He also worked for the French School of the Far East.

When the Khmer Rouge rose to power in Cambodia in 1975, the militant communist organization engaged in the widespread killing of intellectuals, including many of Proeung's peers. Proeung was put under observation by local soldiers, and he feared that he would be killed if his status as an intellectual was discovered. As such, he buried his drawings and books behind a remote cottage for the remainder of the Rouge's regime. Proeung himself was forced to work on a state-owned farm, and at one point was scheduled to be executed - he was saved by the intervention of his brother-in-law, who was a doctor working for the government.

Proeung survived the Cambodian genocide, and following the fall of the Khmer Rouge in 1979 he recovered the drawings he had hidden. During that time he began to construct detailed models of several Cambodian temples in his atelier, which he completed by 1994. His models gained attention in Cambodia, and were visited by Norodom Sihanouk, who was King of Cambodia at the time. As of 2018, Proeung was still making models and teaching younger Cambodians about the nation's architectural heritage.

An article in Roads & Kingdoms once described Proeung as Cambodia's "Most diligent and heroic architect".

=== Models ===
Proeung crafted a number of models which are installed in his garden in Siem Reap - the structures emulated are Ankor Wat, Bayon, Ta Keo monastery, and Bantaey Srei. The models are made from cement, and are cast using home-made molds. As of 2018 the models were open to viewing by tourists.
