= Louis-Joseph-Arthur Melanson =

Canadian Catholic archbishop (1879–1941)

- Archbishop of Moncton, New Brunswick
- Diocese: Moncton
- Installed: December 16, 1936
- Term ended: October 23, 1941
- Predecessor: None
- Successor: Norbert Robichaud
- Other posts: Bishop of Gravelbourg, Saskatchewan

Orders
- Ordination: July 9, 1905

Personal details
- Born: March 23, 1879 Trois-Rivières, Quebec
- Died: October 23, 1941 (aged 62) Moncton, New Brunswick

Louis-Joseph-Arthur Melanson (March 23, 1879 – October 23, 1941) was a Canadian priest and the first Archbishop of Moncton, New Brunswick.

Born in Trois-Rivières, Quebec, he was of Acadian descent on his father's side. Melanson moved to New Richmond, Quebec when he was little. Melanson studied theology in Rimouski and Montreal. He was ordained on July 9, 1905. He was consecrated Bishop of Gravelbourg, Saskatchewan in 1933 and became Archbishop of Moncton, New Brunswick in 1936.
