= Dye (surname) =

Dye is a surname. Notable people with the surname include:

- Albert A. Dye (1845–1934), American politician from Wisconsin
- Alice Dye (1927–2019), American golfer and golf course designer; wife of Pete Dye
- Babe Dye (1897–1962), Canadian ice hockey player
- Bianca Dye (born 1973), Australian radio presenter
- Bobby Dye (born 1937), American basketball coach
- Brad Dye (1933–2018), American politician
- Cameron Dye (born 1959), American actor
- Aunt Caroline Dye (1810 or c. 1843–1918), African American Hoodoo woman and investor
- Charles Dye, American record producer
- Christopher Dye, British biologist and epidemiologist
- Clarissa F. Dye (1832–1921), American nurse
- Courtney King-Dye (born 1977), American equestrian
- Crispin Dye (1952–1993), Australian musician and band manager
- Dale Dye (born 1944), American actor and writer
- Daniel Dye (born 2003), American stock car racing driver
- Dave Dye (born 1945), American college football coach
- David Dye (broadcaster), American radio broadcaster
- David Dye (metallurgist), British metallurgist
- David William Dye (1887–1932), English physicist
- Donteea Dye (born 1993), American football player
- Doug Dye (1921–2005), New Zealand microbiologist
- Ernest Dye (born 1971), American football player
- Eva Emery Dye (1855–1947), American writer, historian and suffragist
- Frank Dye (1928–2010), English dingy sailor
- Gladden Dye (born c. 1934), American college football coach
- Graham Dye (born 1961), English musician
- Henry Dye (1926–1986), American mathematician
- Issi Dye (born 1946), Australian entertainer
- Jack Dye (1876–1944), American college football player and surgeon
- Jack Dye (British Army officer) (1919–2013), British Army officer
- Jeff Dye (born 1983), American comedian and actor
- Jermaine Dye (born 1974), American baseball player
- John Dye (1963–2011), American actor
- John Dye (cricketer) (born 1942), English cricketer
- John H. Dye (1833–1906), American civil engineer and surveyor
- John Martin-Dye (1940–2022), British swimmer
- Joseph Franklin Dye (c.1831–1891) was an American forty-niner, rancher, oilman and alleged gang member
- Josh Dye (born 1996), American baseball pitcher
- Kenneth M. Dye (1936–2023), Canadian Auditor-General
- Kenneth W. Dye (born 1967), American music educator and arranger
- Leighton Dye (1901–1977), American hurdler
- Les Dye (1916–2000), American football player
- Mariyon Dye (born 2006), American football player
- Marvin R. Dye (1895–1997), American lawyer and judge
- Mary Dye (born 1961), American politician from Washington State
- Mason Dye (born 1994), American actor
- Nancy Dye (1947–2015), American historian, philosopher and college president
- Nat Dye (1937–2024), American football player
- Pat Dye (1939–2020), American football player and coach
- Pete Dye (1925–2020), American golf course designer
- Rebecca F. Dye (born 1952), American attorney and Federal official
- Josie Dye, Canadian radio and television personality
- Sara K. Dye (born 1945), American Sauk physician and surgeon
- Shane Dye (born 1966), New Zealand jockey
- Sidney Dye (1900–1958), British politician
- Stanley Dye (1908–2003), Canadian politician from Ontario
- Steven Dye (born 1963), English musician
- Sue Dye, American educator and politician from Arizona
- Teddy Dye (1879–1942), New Zealand trade unionist and miner
- Tericka Dye (born 1972/3), American pornographic actress
- Thomas R. Dye (1935–2025), American political scientist
- Tippy Dye (1915–2012), American college basketball coach
- Toby Dye, English filmmaker
- Tony Dye (born 1990), American football player
- Travis Dye (born 1999), American football player
- Troy Dye (born 1996), American football player
