= David Dye =

David Dye may refer to:

- David William Dye (1887–1932), English physicist
- Dave Dye (born 1945), American football player
- David Dye (broadcaster), American radio broadcaster
- David Dye (metallurgist), British metallurgist

== See also ==
- David Dyer (disambiguation)
