= Fanny Titus Hazen =

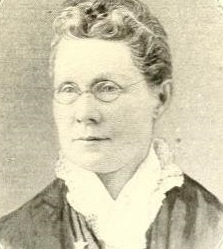
- Fanny Titus Hazen, from a 1910 publication.
- Born: Fanny Hallycarnie Titus; May 9, 1840; Vershire, Vermont
- Died: January 15, 1930; Cambridge, Massachusetts
- Other names: Fannie Titus Hazen
- Known for: President of the National Association of Army Nurses of the Civil War

Fanny Titus Hazen (May 9, 1840 – January 15, 1930) served as an army nurse during the American Civil War. Later in life, she was president of the National Association of Army Nurses of the Civil War.

== Early life ==
Fanny Hallycarnie Titus was born in Vershire, Vermont in 1840, the eldest of the eleven children of Simeon Bacon Titus and Eliza Jane Morris Titus. Her grandfathers William Morris and Lenox Titus both served in the American Revolutionary War. She was raised partly in Lawrence, Massachusetts, living with her grandmother to attend school there.

== Career ==
Three of Titus's brothers served in the Union Army; two died from their wounds and illnesses in the service, and one was a prisoner at Andersonville. Though she was younger than the minimum age preferred for nurses, she joined the Army nursing corps in 1864 under Dorothea Dix, trained under Caroline Burghardt, and worked at Columbia Hospital in Washington, D.C. until the end of the war in 1865. "So hour after hour I watched the life-light flicker and die of many noble men whose lives were a sacrifice for their country," she recalled later in a memoir for Mary A. Gardner Holland's Our Army Nurses (1897).

She was president of the Massachusetts Army Nurses Association in 1918, and president of the National Association of Army Nurses of the Civil War. She was a delegate to national meetings of the Woman's Relief Corps in California (1886) and Indiana (1893). She was also active in the Daughters of the American Revolution and in the Cambridge Equal Suffrage Association.

== Personal life ==
Fanny Titus married Charles Richard Hazen, a Union Army veteran, in Vermont in 1866. They lived in Massachusetts and had four children; two sons died in childhood. Her parents lived with her in their last years; both died in 1903. She had a dressmaking business in Cambridge, Massachusetts. She was widowed when Charles Hazen died in 1916, and she died in Cambridge in 1930, aged 89 years. Her grave is in Cambridge Cemetery.
