= Alice Cary (disambiguation) =

Alice Cary (1820–1871) was an American poet.

Alice Car(e)y may also refer to:

- Alice Shepard Cary (born 1920), American physician and medical missionary
- Alice Dugged Cary (1859–1941), American educator and librarian
- Alice Ross Carey (1948–2013), American preservation architect

== See also ==
- Alice Cary McKinney (1865–1928), American temperance and social reformer
- Alice Cary Risley (1847–1939), nurse during the American Civil War
