= National Association of Army Nurses of the Civil War =

Organization

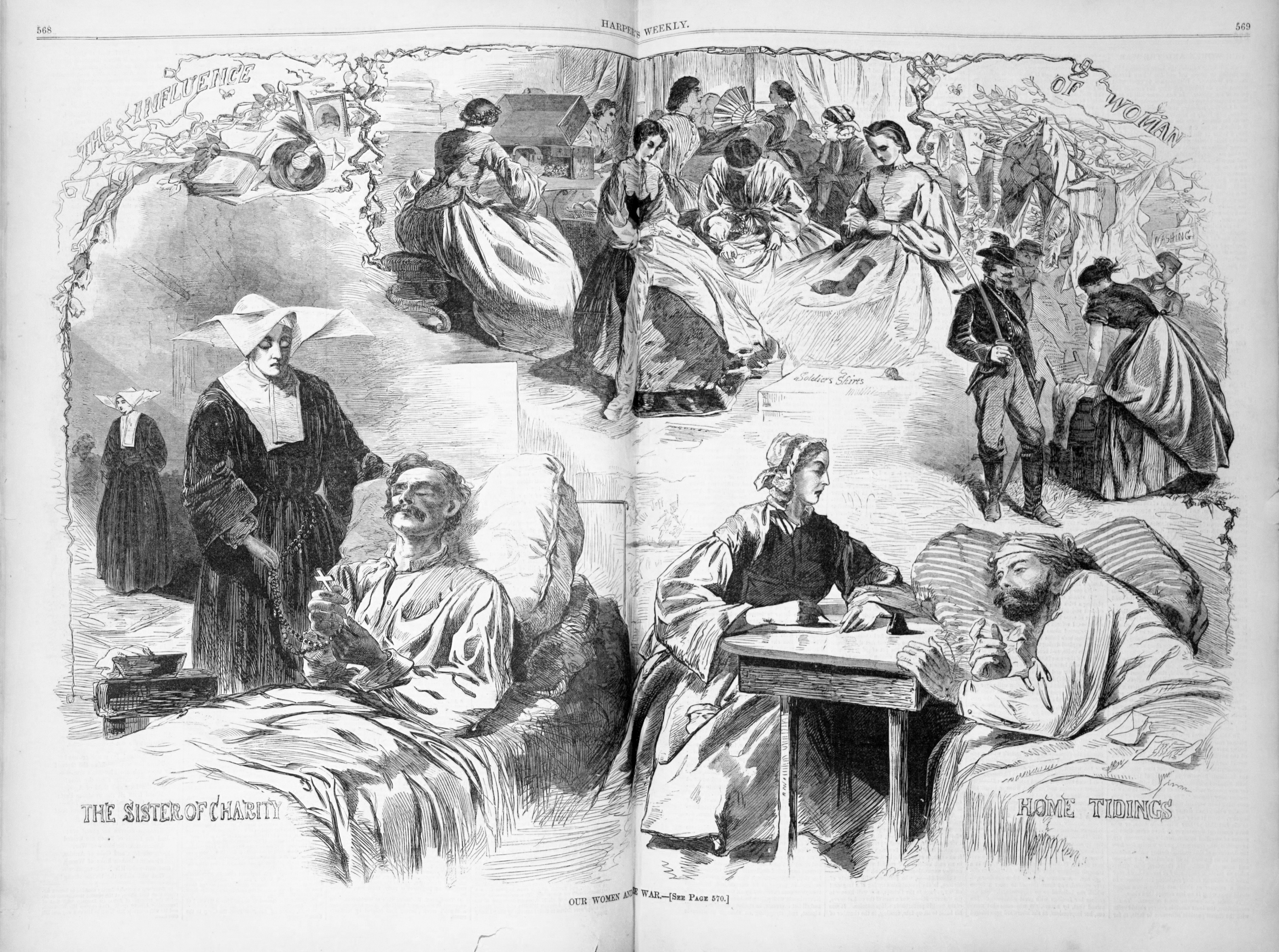
- "Our Women and the War" from Harper’s Weekly, September 6, 1862
- Predecessor: Ex-Nurse's Association of the District of Columbia, National Association of Army Nurses of the Late War
- Formation: 18 June 1881
- Founder: Dorothea Dix
- Founded at: Washington, D.C.
- Legal status: Defunct
- Purpose: Gain recognition for nurses who served in the US Civil War
- Key people: Harriet Patience Dame, Addie L. Ballou
- Affiliations: Grand Army of the Republic

The National Association of Army Nurses of the Civil War or National Army Nurses was an organization of former nurses who served in the American Civil War. It was primarily a social organization, but it also advocated for, and helped to secure, recognition and benefits for nurses who had served in the war.

== Background ==
Over 3,000 middle-class white women served as paid or volunteer nurses during the Civil War, working under the charge of Superintendent of Army Nurses Dorothea Dix. Many of them had no prior medical training. They learned on the job through hard experience, while being exposed to the dangers of the battlefield. Often they were greeted with hostility by the male army surgeons. After the war, these women often received no official government recognition or pension for their services.

== History ==
The organization was established by Dorothea Dix on June 18, 1881 as the "Ex-Nurse's Association of the District of Columbia." It was a social organization, but also advocated for recognition and benefits for members. The society worked to aid members in seeking employment, to care for them during illness, and to promote the honor of the Union.

Dix was elected president of the organization for life. The group met each year in Washington DC, and soon started meeting during the National Encampments (reunions of Civil War veterans) held most years by the Grand Army of the Republic. The group met in during the G.A.R. encampment of 1888. The group met annually.

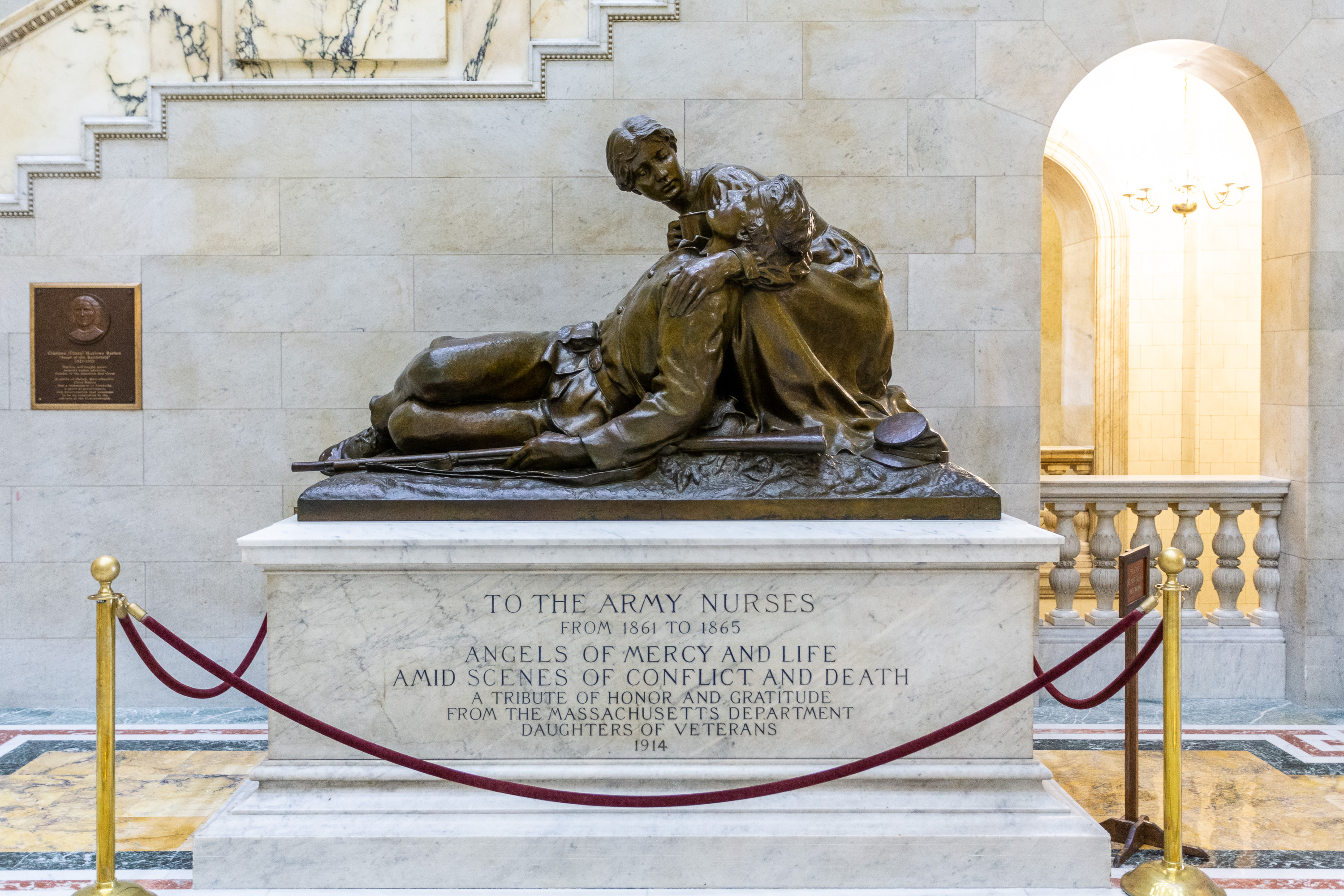
Memorial to U.S. Civil War nurses in the Massachusetts State House: "Angels of mercy and life amid scenes of conflict and death"

At the Encampment of 1892, the group attracted 35 members from all across the United States. Therefore, the group's name was changed to the National Association of Army Nurses of the Late War.

No meetings were held for two years, but the roup re-instituted for a national meeting in Louisville, Kentucky on September 13, 1895. In 1897, the group, then known as the National Army Nurses Association, convened in Buffalo at their headquarters at the Women's Christian Association Building. There were about 500 members.

Association members also came together for the annual G.A.R. encampment of 1899, which was held in Philadelphia. The officers that year were: Elizabeth W. Ewing of Phoenixville, Pennsylvania, president; Kate M. Scott of Brookville, Pennsylvania, secretary; Elizabeth Chapman of St. Louis, Missouri, senior vice president; Della A. Fay of Upper Jay, New York, junior vice president; Jeannette M. Morrill of Santon, Michigan, chaplain; Lydia L. Whiteman of Philadelphia, treasurer; Susanna Kripps of Philadelphia, press correspondent; Emily E. Woodley of Philadelphia, councillor; Mary Aston of Philadelphia, financial secretary; Fanny Titus Hazen of Cambridge, Massachusetts, installing officer; and Julia Magill of Florence, New Jersey, guard. All were reported by local newspapers as planning to attend that year's encampment.

By 1901, the name was changed to National Association of Army Nurses of the Civil War to distinguish it from the Spanish–American War.

The organization disbanded in September 1931, when only five members were still living.

== Membership ==
Membership was open to applicants who had served at least three months as a paid or volunteer nurse during the Civil War. Documentation was required, and applications needed approval by the local Grand Army of the Republic post.

An 1897 article listed some members of the organization: Dorothea Dix, Harriet P. Dame, Annie Wittanmyer, Nansy Biser, Susan Edson and Caroline Burghardt, Clara Barton, "Mother" Bickerdyke, Mary A. Livermore, and Mary S. Gist. Officers of the organization in 1897 consisted of Emily E. Woodley of Philadelphia (President); Elizabeth W. Ewing of Phoenixvile, PA; Elizabeth Chapman of East St. Louis; Sarah K. Clark of Winona, Minn; Hannah L. Palmer of Canastota, NY; Lydia L. Whiteman of Philadelphia; Mary A. Aston of Philadelphia; Addie L. Ballors of San Francisco; Miss Hancock of Philadelphia; and Mrs. Kripp of Philadelphia.

=== Benefits ===
Chief among the achievements of this association were the efforts of its leaders to secure recognition and benefits for the women who had served as nurses during the American Civil War.

Pensions: In 1892, Congress passed a law which allowed for a pension of $12 per month for all nurses who had been hired and paid by the Government. However, most volunteer nurses still were not awarded pensions, at least as of 1910.

National cemetery privileges: Members (and in fact all nurses of the Civil War), were entitled to burial in National Cemeteries.

== Presidents ==
National Presidents of the Association included many of the well-known nurses of the Civil War:

- Dorothea Dix 1881-1887
- Dr. Susan Ann Edson 1887-?, one of the first women doctors in the United States, and personal physician to President Garfield
- Harriet Patience Dame of New Hampshire
- Addie L. Ballou of California
- Emily E. Woodley 1895-1898 of Pennsylvania
- Elizabeth Wendell Ewing of Pennsylvania
- Ada Johnson of Missouri (two terms)
- Delia A.B. Fay of New York
- Margaret Hamilton of Massachusetts
- Fanny Titus Hazen of Massachusetts
- Clarissa F. Dye of Pennsylvania
- Rebecca S. Smith of Minnesota
- Cornelia Hancock of Philadelphia
- Mary E. Robey Lacey of Utah
- Rebecca Lane Pennypacker Price of Pennsylvania
- Alice Cary Risley 1915–1931

== External resources ==
- "Annie Bell with patients after the Battle of Nashville, circa 1864" (U.S. Sanitary Commission photograph), in "Civil War Nurses," in "Civil War Women," in "Understanding War Through Imagery: The Civil War in American Memory." Carlisle, Pennsylvania: U.S. Army Heritage & Education Center, retrieved online May 16, 2018.
- Mary Ann Bickerdyke Papers: Subject file; National Association of Army Nurses of the Civil War, 1899-1900. Washington, D.C.: U.S. Library of Congress (Manuscript Division).
- Stearns, Amanda Akin. The Lady Nurse of Ward E. New York, New York: The Baker & Taylor Company, 1909.
- "The Diary of a Civil War Nurse." Washington, D.C.: Albert H. Small Documents Gallery, Smithsonian: National Museum of American History, retrieved online May 16, 2018.

== Gallery ==
Presidents and other officers of the National Association of Army Nurses of the Civil War.

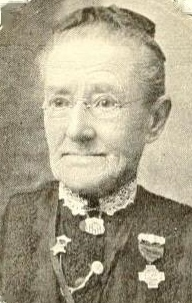
Mary A. Aston

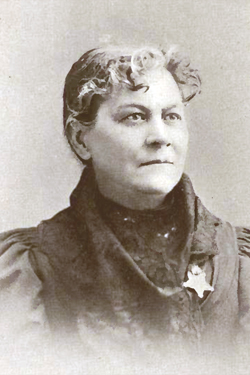
Addie Ballou

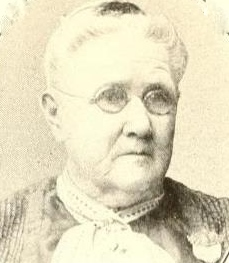
Elizabeth Chapman

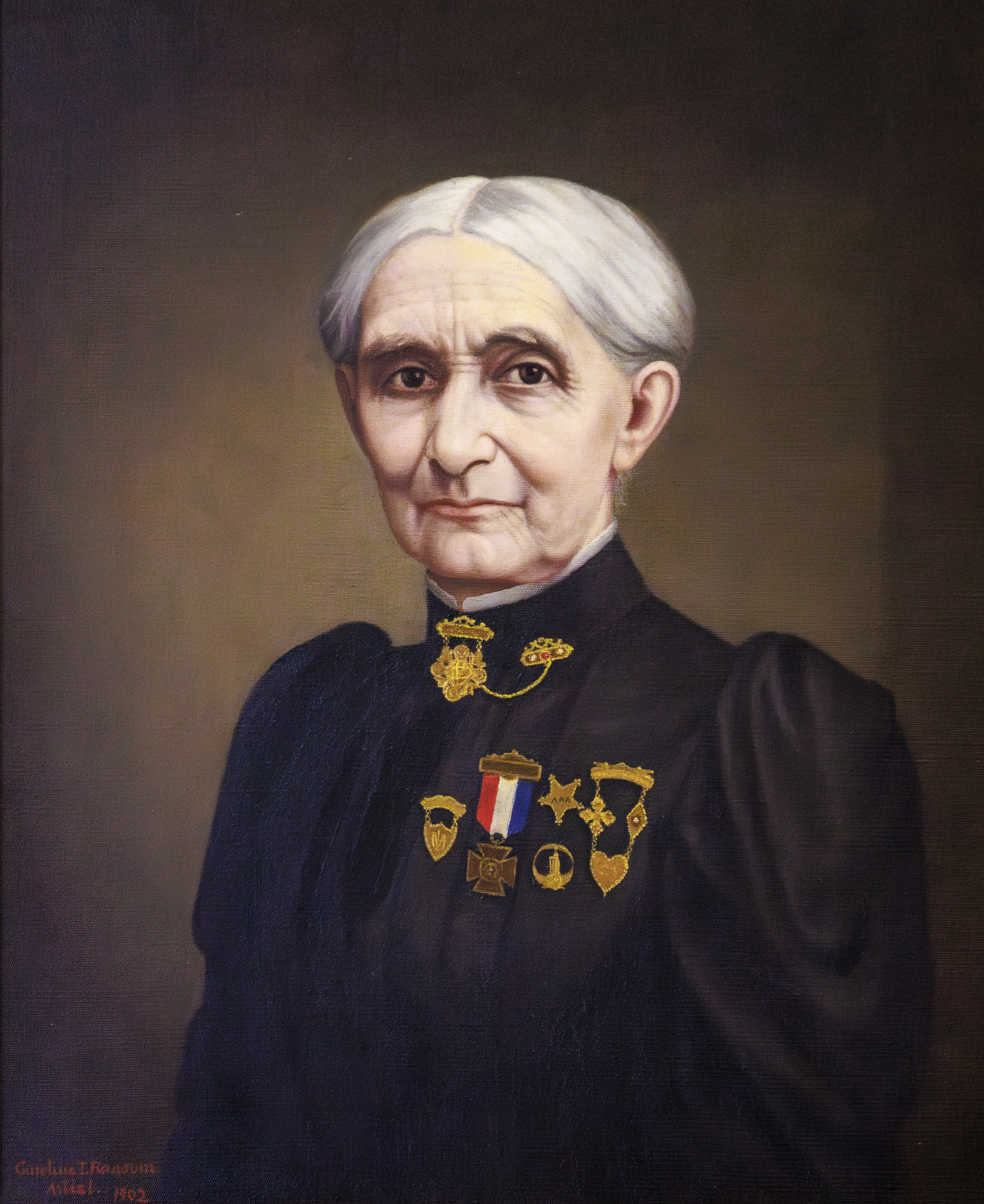
Harriet Patience Dame

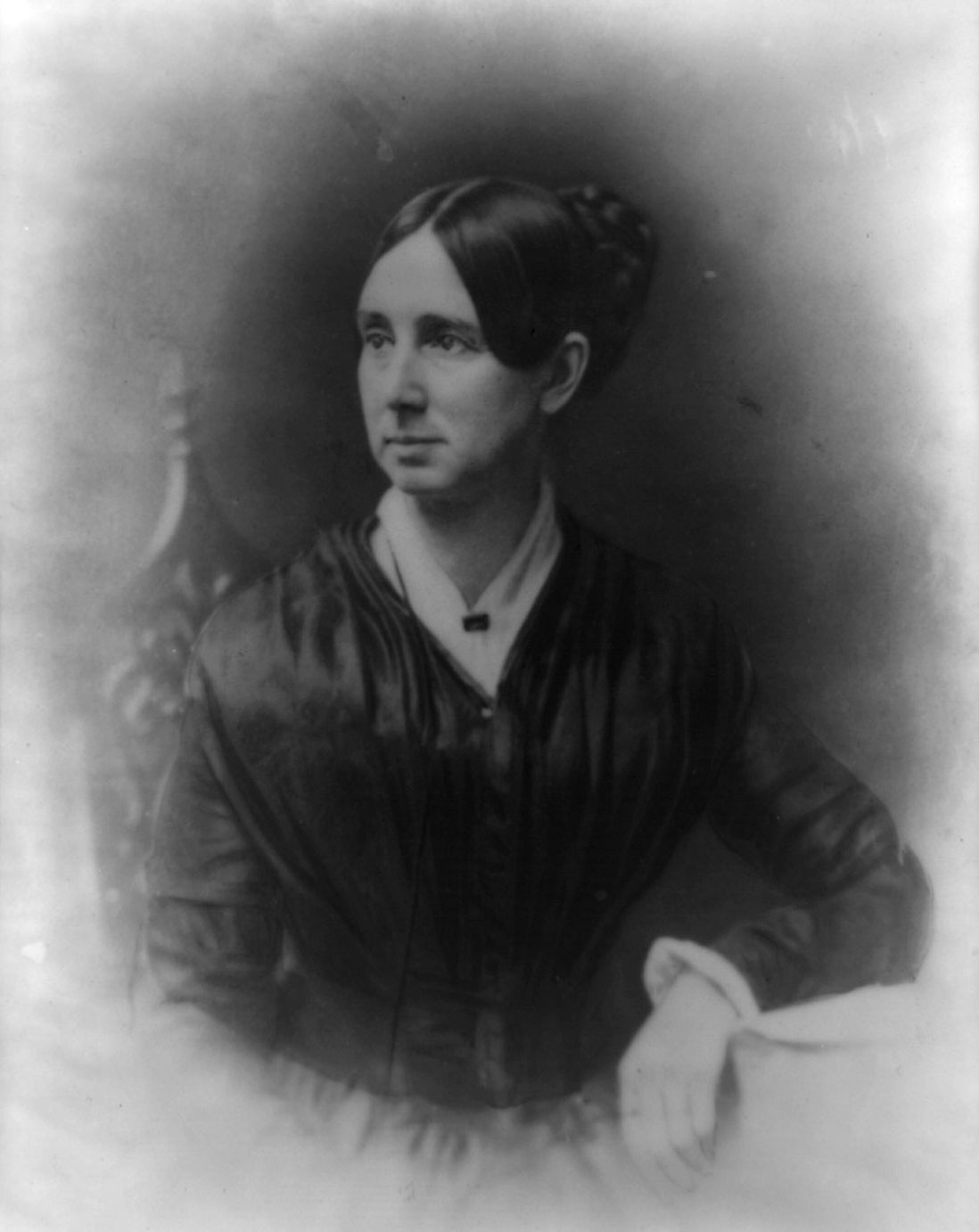
Dorothea Dix

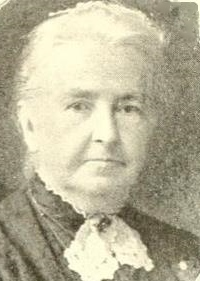
Clarissa F. Dye

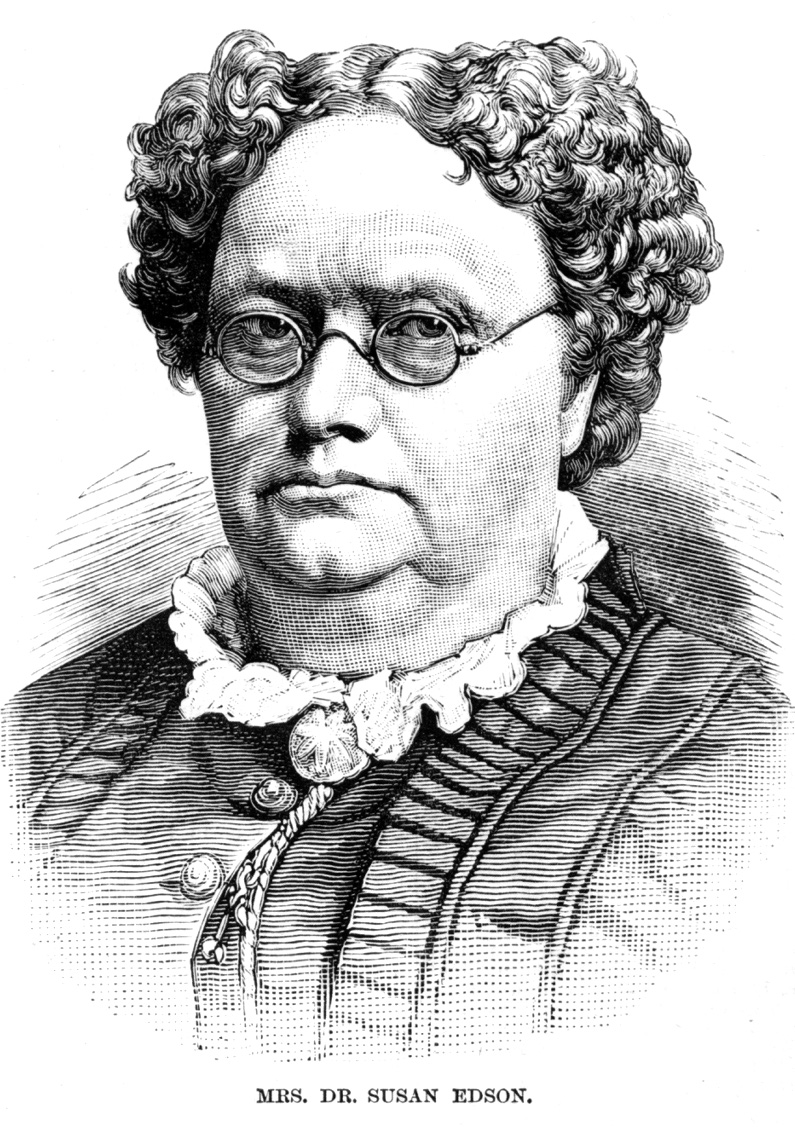
Susan Ann Edson, M.D.

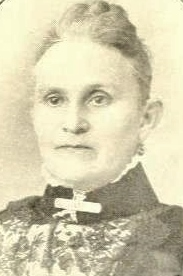
Elizabeth Wendell Ewing

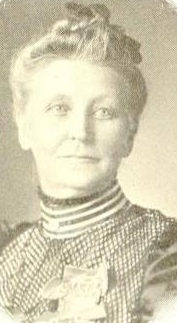
Delia A. B. Fay

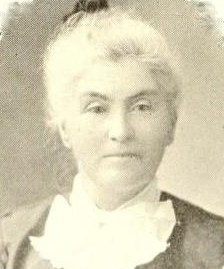
Margaret Hamilton

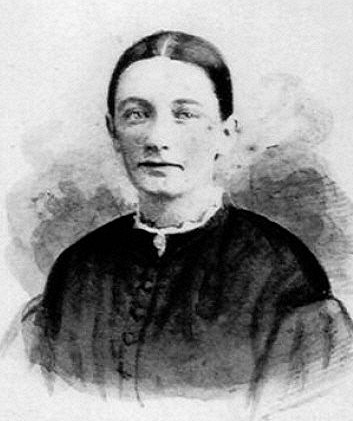
Cornelia Hancock

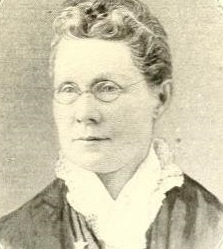
Fanny Titus Hazen

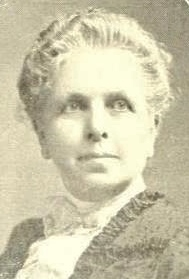
Ada Johnson

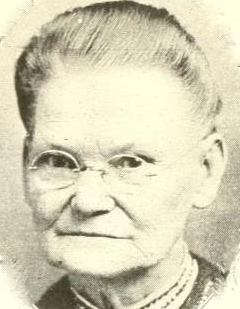
Susanna Krips

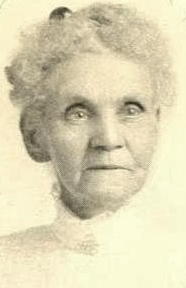
Mary Roby Lacey

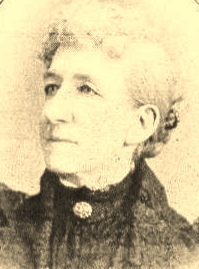
Hannah L. Palmer

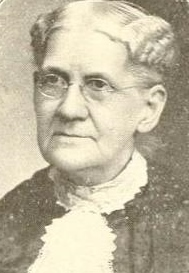
Rebecca L. (Pennypacker) Price

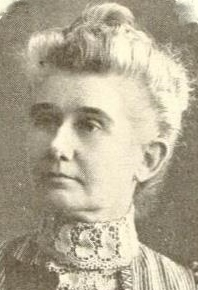
Alice Cary Risley

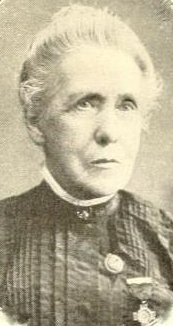
Kate M. Scott

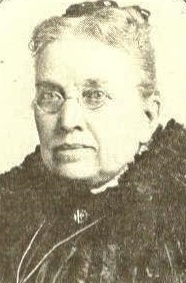
Rebecca S. Smith

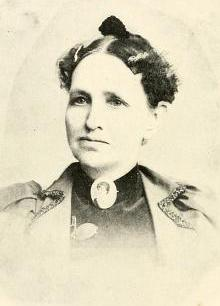
Hannah Judkins Starbird

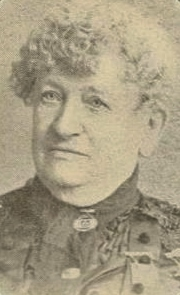
Lydia L. Whiteman

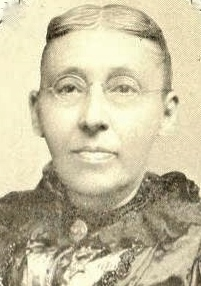
Emily E. Woodley
