= Mary A. Aston =

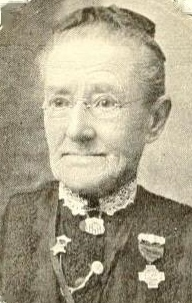
- Mary A. Aston, from a 1910 publication
- Born: c. 1836; Pennsylvania, U.S.
- Died: March 27, 1913 (aged 77); Philadelphia, Pennsylvania, U.S.
- Resting place: Northwood Cemetery
- Occupation: Nurse during the American Civil War

Mary A. Aston (c. 1836 – March 27, 1913) served as an army nurse during the American Civil War. After the war, she was active in several national and Philadelphia organizations supporting veterans' causes.

== Early life ==
Mary A. Aston was born in about 1836, in Pennsylvania.

== Career ==
Aston served in the Philadelphia Volunteer Corps of Army Nurses from 1862 to 1865. "My husband was sickly and unable to go to war and we decided that one of us at any rate should do something for our country," she explained many years later. She worked at the Citizens' Volunteer Hospital in Philadelphia, alongside surgeon R. S. Kenderdine. She became deaf after a cannon exploded close to her.

Later in life Aston was financial secretary of the National Association of Army Nurses of the Civil War. She was also an officer in the Memorial Association of Philadelphia, a women's organization that raised funds for headstones and other monuments for Union Army veterans. She was a member of the Philadelphia Army Nurses' Association.

== Personal life ==
Aston's husband, Samuel Aston, died during the war, in August 1864. She died in 1913, aged 77 years, in Philadelphia.
