= Delia Bartlett Fay =

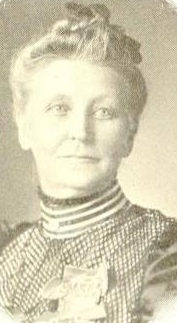
- Born: August 29, 1840; New York
- Died: May 29, 1908; Jay, New York
- Other names: Delia A. B. Fay

Delia Bartlett Fay (August 29, 1840 – May 27, 1908) was a Union nurse during the American Civil War. She later served as president of the National Association of Army Nurses of the Civil War.

== Civil War service ==
Fay's husband Artemus William "Willie" Fay enlisted in the 118th regiment New York State Volunteers in Company C, and Fay joined him in service. Fay and her husband were first stationed at Fort Ethan Allen near Washington, D.C. to protect the capital. They remained here until 1863. Afterwards, the regiment moved to Suffolk, Virginia for their first actions. Fay was present at these actions, which included a siege lasting for multiple days. Fay, however, was fearless under rebel fire. The regiment next moved to Yorktown, where Fay continued her nursing duties.

Fay built a rapport with the soldiers of the regiment. During marches, Fay shared much of the experience with soldiers, including carrying her own supplies as well the supplies of injured regiment members. Fay also acted as a scout at one point, to locate Confederate forces. Fay would also, in her work, listen to the stories of African American citizens, only furthering her reputation for kindness.

== Later years ==
After the war, Fay served as president of the National Association of Army Nurses of the Civil War. She was widowed when Willie Fay died in 1907, and she died in 1908, in New York, aged 67 years.
