= Tillie Pierce =

Nurse from the American Civil War

Matilda J. "Tillie" (Pierce) Alleman
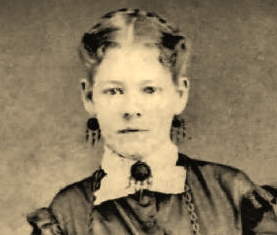
- Tillie Pierce (c. 1868)
- Born: March 11, 1848; Gettysburg, Pennsylvania, US
- Died: March 15, 1914 (aged 66); Philadelphia, Pennsylvania, US
- Occupations: Author, At Gettysburg, or What a Girl Saw and Heard of the Battle: A True Narrative
- Spouse: Horace Alleman

Tillie Pierce (also known as Matilda Alleman) was the author of At Gettysburg, or What A Girl Saw and Heard of the Battle: A True Narrative. Published more than a quarter of a century after the Battle of Gettysburg, the book recounted her experiences during the American Civil War.

== Formative years ==
Born in Gettysburg, Pennsylvania, on March 11, 1848, Matilda Jane ("Tillie") Pierce was a daughter of Margaret A. (McCurdy) Pierce, a native of Clearfield County, Pennsylvania, and Maryland native James Pierce (1806–1896), a butcher. According to historian Uzal Ent, she was the youngest of the four Pierce children; her older siblings were James Shaw Pierce (1836–1909), William Henry Harrison Pierce (1841–1908), and Margaret ("Maggie") Pierce (1845–1867).

During her formative years, the family lived above the Gettysburg butcher shop of their patriarch, whose real estate and personal property were valued at $6,500 in 1860, according to the federal census taker that year. The Pierce household included James and Margaret Pierce and their children: James (aged 24), William (aged 19), Margaret (aged 14), and Matilda (aged 12), as well as 12-year-old Franklin Culp and Eliza Fetterhoff, a 48-year-old seamstress.

== American Civil War ==
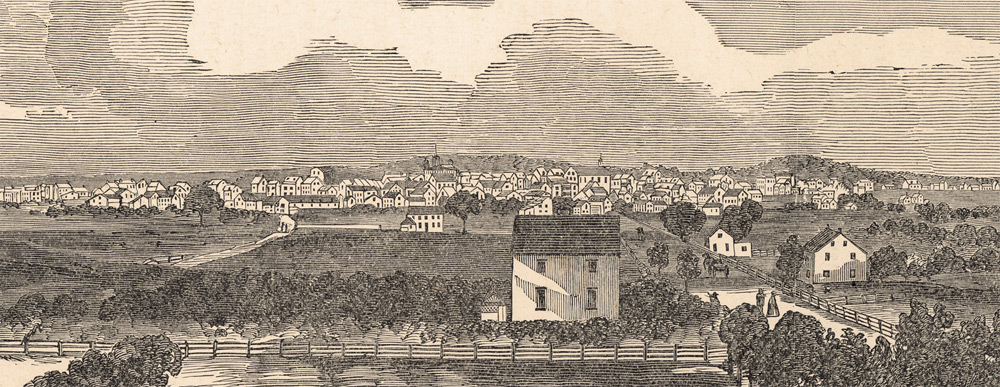
Gettysburg in 1863

As a teenager, Tillie Pierce became well acquainted not with just the worries of war, but the horrors of military combat when a key battle of the American Civil War broke out in her hometown. Her older brothers, James and William, had enlisted as privates with the Union Army in 1861 and 1862, respectively; James was a member of Company K of the 1st Pennsylvania Reserves (30th Regiment) while William was a member of the 15th Pennsylvania Cavalry's E Company.

As her brothers and other Union soldiers battled Confederate States south of Pennsylvania, Tillie Pierce and her parents and sister "often heard that the rebels were about to make a raid, but had always found it a false alarm." Their calm was shattered in June 1863, however, when they received word that CSA troops had reached Chambersburg in neighboring Franklin County. A week later, while working on literary exercises at the Young Ladies Seminary, a private finishing school for girls at 66–68 West High Street which she attended with her sister, Maggie, she was directed by her teacher to run to her home when CSA troops appeared on the outskirts of Gettysburg. She arrived there just as CSA infantrymen began their removal of horses, food and other supplies throughout the town in order to sustain their march before departing later that night. Her next encounter with soldiers occurred early the next week as Union troops arrived.

They passed northwardly along Washington Street, turned toward the west on reaching Chambersburg Street, and passed out in the direction of the Theological Seminary.

It was to me a novel and grand sight. I had never seen so many soldiers at one time. They were Union soldiers and that was enough for me, for I then knew we had protection, and I felt they were our dearest friends. I afterwards learned that these men were Buford's cavalry, numbering about six thousand men.

A crowd of "us girls" were standing on the corner of Washington and High Streets as these soldiers passed by. Desiring to encourage them, who, as we were told, would before long be in battle, my sister started to sing the old war song "Our Union Forever."

Tillie was certainly less generous when it came to describing the fear felt by her African American neighbors in the days leading up to the battle, writing:

I remember one evening in particular, when quite a number of them had assembled to guard the town that night against an attack from the enemy ... On these occasions it was also amusing to behold the conduct of the colored people of the town. Gettysburg had a goodly number of them. They regarded the Rebels as having an especial hatred toward them, and believed that if they fell into their hands, annihilation was sure ...

I can see them yet; men and women with bundles as large as old-fashioned feather ticks slung across their backs, almost bearing them to the ground. Children also, carrying their bundles, and striving in vain to keep up with their seniors. The greatest consternation was depicted on all their countenances as they hurried along; crowding, and running against each other in their confusion ; children stumbling, falling, and crying. Mothers, anxious for their offspring, would stop for a moment to hurry them up, saying:

'Fo' de Lod's sake, you chillen, cum right long quick! If dem Rebs dun kotch you, dev tear you all up,' and similar expressions. These terrible warnings were sure to have the desired effect; for, with their eyes open wider than ever, they were not long in hastening their steps.

=== Eve of the Battle of Gettysburg ===
When Tillie Pierce and her friends heard that Union troops were already on the move just after breakfast on the morning of July 1, 1863, they hurried off to watch the spectacle unfold on Washington Street:

First came a long line of cavalry, then wagon after wagon passed by for quite awhile. Again we sang patriotic songs as they moved along. Some of these wagons were filled with stretchers and other articles; in others we noticed soldiers reclining, who were doubtless in some way disabled.

It was between nine and ten o'clock when we first noticed firing in the direction of Seminary Ridge. At first the sound was faint, then it grew louder. Soon the booming of cannon was heard, then great clouds of smoke were seen rising beyond the ridge. The sound became louder and louder, and was now incessant. The troops passing us moved faster, the men had now become excited and urged on their horses. The battle was waging. This was my first terrible experience.

I remember hearing some of the soldiers remarking that there was no telling how soon some of them would be brought back in those ambulances, or carried on the stretchers. I hardly knew what it meant, but I learned afterward, even before the day had passed.

It was almost noon when the last of the train had passed and I began to think of dinner and the folks at home.

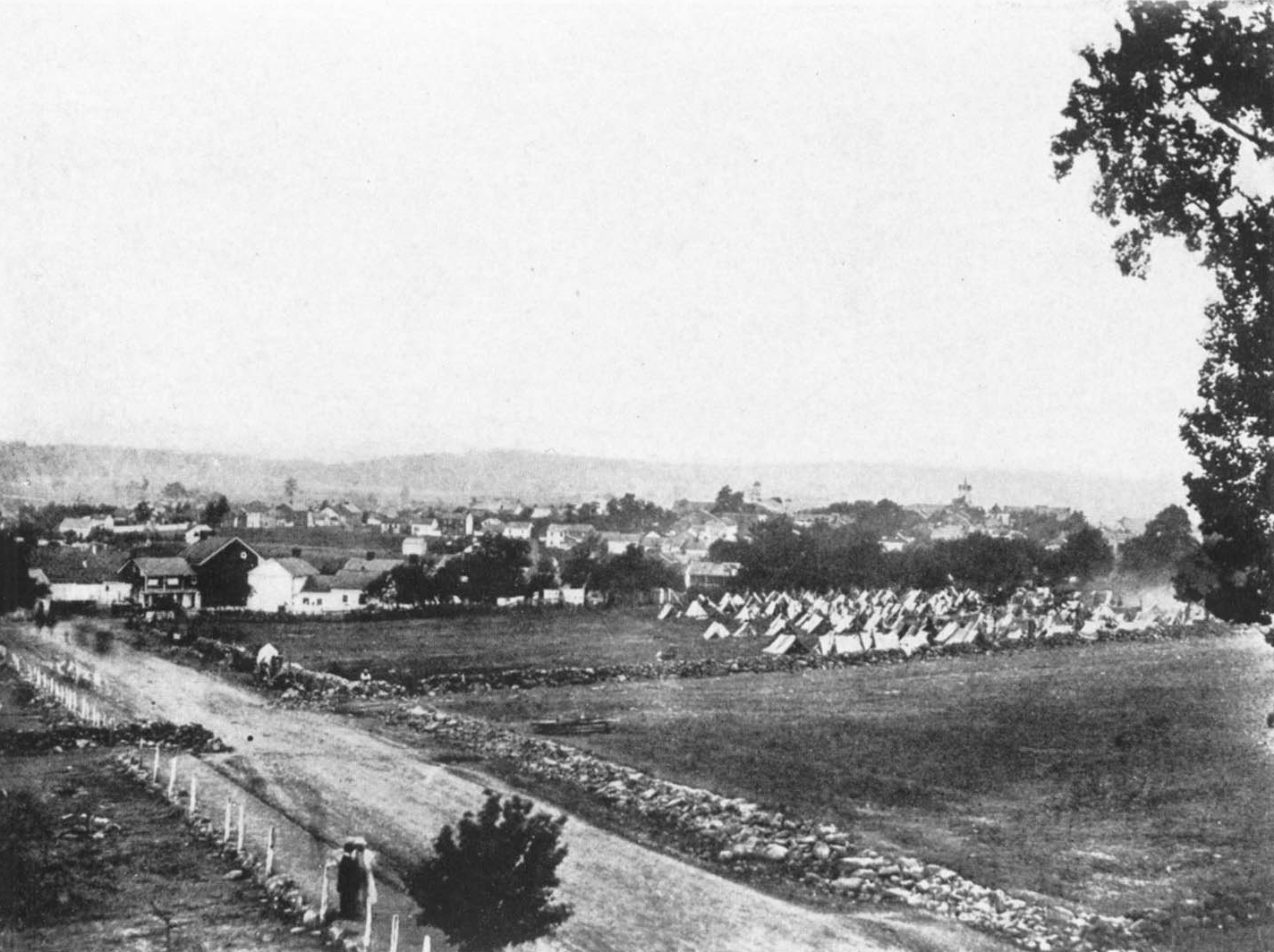
General photo of Gettysburg taken around the time of the 1863 battle there

Later that night, her parents made plans to send her to what they believed would be a safer place – a farm owned by Jacob Weikert, the father of one of the family's neighbors. They informed her that she would depart with that neighbor (Mrs. Schriver) and her children the next day. The Weikert farm, she was told, was located near the foot of a rocky hill south of Gettysburg known as "Round Top." What her parents could not have known was that, as the Battle of Gettysburg raged over the next three days, their daughter would not only be in a position to witness the intense fighting which occurred nearby, but would also be called upon to help army surgeons care for the fallen men. "The only preparation I made for the departure," she later wrote, "was to carry my best clothes down to the cellar, so that they might be safe when I returned; never thinking of taking any along, nor how long I would stay."

=== Battle of Gettysburg (day one) ===
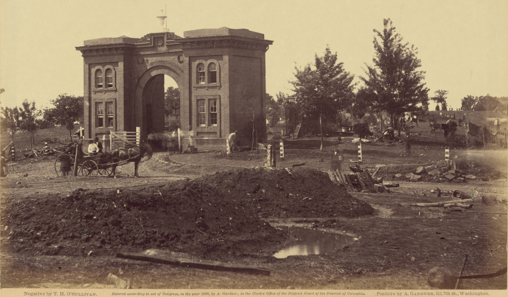
Gate at Evergreen Cemetery after the Battle of Gettysburg, 1863

Tillie Pierce departed for Jacob Weikert's farm with Mrs. Schriver around 1 p.m. on July 1. Walking down Baltimore Street and through Evergreen Cemetery, they soon witnessed Union artillerymen readying their cannon.

They told us to hurry as fast as possible; that we were in great danger of being shot by the Rebels, whom they expected would shell toward us at any moment. We fairly ran to get out of this new danger.

As I looked toward the Seminary Ridge I could see and hear the confusion of the battle. Troops moving hither and thither; the smoke of the conflict arising from the fields; shells bursting in the air, together with the din, rising and falling in mighty undulations. These things, beheld for the first time, filled my soul with the greatest apprehensions.

We soon reached the Taneytown road, and while traveling along, were overtaken by an ambulance wagon in which was the body of a dead soldier.... We continued on our way, and had gotten to a little one and a half story house, standing on the west side of the road, when, on account of the muddy condition of the road, we were compelled to stop. This place on the following day became General Meade's headquarters.

While we were standing at the gate, not knowing what to do or where to go, a soldier came out and kindly told us he would try to get some way to help us further on, as it was very dangerous to remain there.

After a short wait, the soldier found a place for them on a wagon; they quickly reached the Weikert farm just before the battle broke out near Round Top and Little Round Top. Her initial excitement quickly dissipated when the first wounded soldier was carried into the Weikert's house. Still alive, he had been hit in the head by artillery shrapnel. As more Union infantrymen began flooding the area, the 15-year-old soon realized she could do more than just watch.

Obtaining a bucket, I hastened to the spring, and there, with others, carried water to the moving column until the spring was empty. We then went to the pump standing on the south side of the house, and supplied water from it.

That same afternoon and evening, she encountered increasing numbers of wounded soldiers.

Some limping, some with their heads and arms in bandages, some crawling, others carried on stretchers or brought in ambulances. Suffering, cast down and dejected, it was a truly pitiable gathering. Before night the barn was filled with the shattered and dying heroes of this day's struggle.

That evening Beckie Weikert, the daughter at home, and I went out to the barn to see what was transpiring there. Nothing before in my experience had ever paralleled the sight we then and there beheld. There were the groaning and crying, the struggling and dying, crowded side by side, while attendants sought to aid and relieve them as best they could....

As we entered the basement or cellar-kitchen of the house, we found many nurses making beef tea for the wounded. Seeing that we were crying they inquired as to the cause. We told them where we had been and what we had seen.... They soon dispelled our terror and caused us to laugh so much that many times when we should have been sober minded we were not; the reaction having been too sudden for our overstrung nerves.

A chaplain then advised, "Little girl, do all you can for the poor soldiers and the Lord will reward you." Tillie Pierce went on to do just that.

=== Battle of Gettysburg (days two and three) ===
As her friends baked bread with her neighbor on the second day of battle, Tillie Pierce helped distribute that bread to hungry Union troops, but even that seemingly simple task was not without risk.

It was shortly before noon that I observed soldiers lying on the ground just back of the house, dead. They had fallen just where they had been standing when shot. I was told that they had been picked off by Rebel sharpshooters who were up in Big Round Top.

Toward the middle of the afternoon heavy cannonading began on the two Round Tops just back of the house. This was so terrible and severe that it was with great difficulty we could hear ourselves speak. It began very unexpectedly; so much so, that we were all terror-stricken, and hardly knew what to do....

Those who are familiar with this battle now know what havoc and destruction were accomplished on this afternoon, on the west side of the Round Tops, at Devil's Den, Sherby's Peach Orchard and the Wheat-field.

Sometime between 4 and 5 p.m. that afternoon, Tillie Pierce and her friends were caught between the opposing forces as members of the 1st Pennsylvania Reserves forced a retreat by CSA troops who were advancing on the Weikert's house.

On this evening the number of wounded brought to the place was indeed appalling. They were laid in different parts of the house. The orchard and space around the buildings were covered with the shattered and dying, and the barn became more and more crowded. The scene had become terrible beyond description.

That night, in the house, I made myself useful in doing whatever I could to assist the surgeons and nurses. Cooking and making beef tea seemed to be going on all the time.... Some were cutting bread and spreading it, while I was kept busy carrying the pieces to the soldiers.

One soldier, sitting near the doorway that led into a little room in the southeast corner of the basement, beckoned me to him. He was holding a lighted candle in his hand, and was watching over a wounded soldier who was lying upon the floor. He asked me if I would get him a piece of bread, saying he was very hungry. I said certainly, ran away and soon returned. I gave him the bread and he seemed very thankful. He then asked me if I would hold the light and stay with the wounded man until he came back.

She took the candle, and sat with the man, talking with him until his comrade returned. Promising to visit with him again, she retired for the evening. When she returned the next morning, she learned that she had been conversing with General Stephen H. Weed, and that he had died during the night. Sent away from the Weikert farm by carriage on the third day of battle, Tillie Pierce and her friends were permitted to return later in the day when the danger had passed.

Upon reaching the place I fairly shrank back aghast at the awful sight presented. The approaches were crowded with wounded, dying and dead.... I remember that Mrs. Weikert went through the house, and after searching awhile, brought all the muslin and linen she could spare. This we tore into bandages and gave them to the surgeons, to bind up the poor soldiers' wounds. By this time, amputating benches had been placed about the house. I must have become inured to seeing the terrors of battle, else I could hardly have gazed upon the scenes now presented.

=== Aftermath of the battle ===
As the smoke began to clear over the surrounding countryside, Tillie Pierce remained at the Weikert farm waiting for word that it was safe enough to head home. It was sometime around this time that she learned that one of the women she knew – Mary Virginia ("Jennie") Wade – had been killed by a stray bullet on the third day of the battle. Finally permitted to rejoin her family, she bid farewell to the Weikerts on July 7, 1863. Later, she recalled: "The whole landscape had been changed and I felt as though we were in a strange and blighted land."

A few days after the battle, several soldiers came to our house and asked mother if she would allow them to bring their wounded Colonel to the place, provided they would send two nurses along to help wait on him, saying they would like to have him kept at a private house.

As we had a very suitable room she consented.

The wounded officer was carried to the house on a litter, and was suffering greatly. After they got him up stairs, and were about placing him on the bed, it was found to be too short, so that the foot-board had to be taken off and an extension added. The Colonel was a very tall man and of fine proportions.

He had been severely wounded in the right ankle and shoulder, the latter wound extending to his spine.

The surgeons wanted to amputate his foot, saying it was necessary in order to save his life; but the Colonel objected, and said that if his foot must go he would go too.

Mother waited on him constantly, and the nurses could not have been more devoted.

He was highly esteemed by all his men, many of whom visited him at the house, and even wept over him in his suffering and helplessness. They always spoke of him as one of the bravest men in the army.

Before long his sister came, who with tender care and cheering words no doubt hastened his recovery.

Several months elapsed before he was able to be removed; when, on a pair of crutches, he left for his home in St. Paul. As he was leaving the house he could hardly express fully, his thanks and appreciation for all our kindness; and on parting kissed us all, as though he were bidding farewell to his own kith and kin. We, on our part, felt as though one of our own family were leaving. He promised that whenever able he would come back to see us.

About three years after the battle, I was standing on the front pavement one day, when a carriage suddenly stopped at the front door. A gentleman alighted, came up to me, shook hands, and kissed me without saying a word. I knew it was the Colonel by his tall, manly form.

He ran up the front porch, rang the bell, and on meeting the rest of the family, heartily shook hands, and greeted mother and sister with a kiss.... The officer of whom I have just written, was Colonel William Colvill, of the First Minnesota Regiment.

During August 1863, Tillie Pierce also reportedly assisted with nursing duties at Gettysburg's Camp Letterman General Hospital.

== Post-Civil War life ==
After the Civil War ended, the Pierces were made whole again, their family reunited in Gettysburg following the honorable discharge of sons, James Shaw and William H. Pierce, but their harmony was disrupted again by the death, in 1867, of the family's oldest daughter, Maggie. Three years later, Tillie Pierce was documented by a federal census taker as the only child still living at home with the Pierce family matriarch and patriarch, who was described on that year's census as a "grocery merchant."

On September 28, 1871, Tillie Pierce then also left the nest when she wed Horace P. Alleman (1847–1908) at the Christ Lutheran Church in Gettysburg. A resident of Harrisburg, graduate of Gettysburg College and Civil War veteran, he had served initially as a private in the Civil War with Company D of the 18th Pennsylvania Militia (1862) and then again as a private with Company I of the 30th Pennsylvania (Emergency Militia of 1863). Following their marriage, they made their home in Selinsgrove, Snyder County, where her husband practiced law. Together, they greeted the arrival of a son, Henry Pierce Alleman (1872–1949), and daughters, Anna Margaret Alleman (1878–1926), who later wed Richard Howard Colburn (1840–1920), and Mary, who was born in June 1882.

After their marriage, Tillie and Horace Alleman moved into the Selinsgrove mansion formerly owned by Pennsylvania Governor Simon Snyder. Located at 121 Market Street, their home became a de facto firebreak during the Great Fire of 1874, its sturdy stonework preventing the flames devouring other parts of Selinsgrove from sweeping northward. Afterward, the Allemans played a major role in fundraising efforts to help residents and business owners rebuild. Historic preservation efforts were then initiated after the turn of the century to ensure that the Snyder mansion would also be restored.

In 1880, Tillie and Horace Alleman were documented by a federal census taker as residing in Selingsgrove with their children, Henry and Anna. This decade proved to be memorable because this was the time when Tillie (Pierce) Alleman completed her memoir, At Gettysburg, or What a Girl Saw and Heard of the Battle: A True Narrative. She did so, she wrote, because "incidents connected with the Battle of Gettysburg, [were] daily becoming more appreciated, and believing that the recital of those occurrences [would also] awaken new interest as time [rolled] on." First published in 1889, the book continues to sell in print form although it has long since passed into the public domain. Now digitized by multiple academic institutions, the text is freely available online via the HathiTrust (University of Michigan), University of Pennsylvania, and University of Virginia.

It was also during this decade that she was awarded the deed to the home where she grew up (an historic building located at the corner of Baltimore and Breckenridge streets in Gettysburg that would also later bear her name). According to Mark Walters, "After the death of William Breckenridge ... William McCurdy, deeded the property to James Pierce, Tillie Pierce's father. The deed was later passed on to Tillie in the late 1800s, after she had married and become Matilda Jane “Tillie” Alleman."

The turn of the century census taker who visited the Alleman's Selingsgrove home noted that the household included only the parents and two daughters in 1900; by 1910, it was just Tillie Alleman and her daughter, Anna. On April 8, 1911, the Harrisburg Telegraph announced that "Miss Alleman [who] lives in the old stone house built by Governor Simon Snyder, Pennsylvania's war Governor of 1812," had invited the members of her Daughters of 1812 chapter to hold their meeting at her home in June, and then reported on April 22 that Tillie Alleman and her daughter, Anna, had traveled to Harrisburg in Dauphin County to visit "Mr. and Mrs. Edwin Brown."

== Death and burial ==
Tillie (Pierce) Alleman died of complications from cancer at the age of 66 on March 15, 1914, in Philadelphia, Pennsylvania, and was laid to rest at the Trinity Lutheran Church Cemetery in Selinsgrove, Snyder County.

== External resources ==
- Alleman, Mrs. Tillie (Pierce). At Gettysburg, or What a Girl Saw and Heard of the Battle: A True Narrative. New York: W. Lake Borland, 1889.
- Historic Selinsgrove (community history with historic photos). Selinsgrove, Pennsylvania: Selinsgrove Projects, Inc.
