= Louis Essen =

English physicist (1908–1997)

- Born: 6 September 1908; Nottingham, England, UK
- Died: 24 August 1997 (aged 88); Great Bookham, Surrey, England, UK
- Known for: The atomic clock/speed of light
- Awards: Fellow of the Royal Society (1960); A.S. Popov Gold Medal from the USSR Academy of Sciences (1959); Order of the British Empire (1959); Rabi Award of the IEEE UFFC (1987)
- Scientific career
- Fields: physics
- Doctoral advisor: D. W. Dye

Louis Essen OBE FRS (6 September 1908 – 24 August 1997) was an English physicist whose most notable achievements were in the precise measurement of time and the determination of the speed of light. He was a critic of Albert Einstein's theory of relativity, particularly as it related to time dilation.

== Early work ==
Born in Nottingham, Essen earned his degree in physics from the University of London in 1928, having studied at University College Nottingham. He started work at the National Physical Laboratory (NPL) the following year, under D. W. Dye, investigating the potential of tuning forks and quartz crystal oscillators for precise time measurement. His research led to his development of the quartz ring clock in 1938, the clock soon becoming a standard for time measurement at observatories throughout the world.

== The speed of light ==
During World War II, Essen worked on radar and developed a number of instruments, including the cavity resonance wavemeter. It was this work that suggested to Essen the possibility of a more precise measurement of the speed of light. In 1946, in collaboration with A.C. Gordon-Smith, he used a microwave cavity, of precisely known dimensions, and exploited his expertise in time-measurement to establish the frequency for a variety of its normal modes. As the wavelength of the modes was known from the geometry of the cavity and from electromagnetic theory, knowledge of the associated frequencies enabled a calculation of the speed of light. Their result, 299,792±3 km/s, was substantially greater than that from the prevailing sequence of optical measurements that had begun around the start of the 20th century and Essen had to withstand some fierce criticism and disbelief. Even NPL director Sir Charles Galton Darwin, while supporting the work, observed that Essen would get the correct result once he had perfected the technique. Moreover, W.W. Hansen at Stanford University had used a similar technique and obtained a measurement which was more consistent with the conventional (optical) wisdom. However, a combination of Essen's stubbornness, his iconoclasm and his belief in his own skill at measurement (and a little help with calculations from Alan Turing) inspired him to refine his apparatus and to repeat his measurement in 1950, establishing a result of 299,792.5±1 km/s. This was the value adopted by the 12th General Assembly of the Radio-Scientific Union in 1957. Most subsequent measurements have been consistent with this value. In 1983, the 17th Conférence Générale des Poids et Mesures adopted the standard value, 299,792.458 km/s for the speed of light.

== Atomic clocks ==
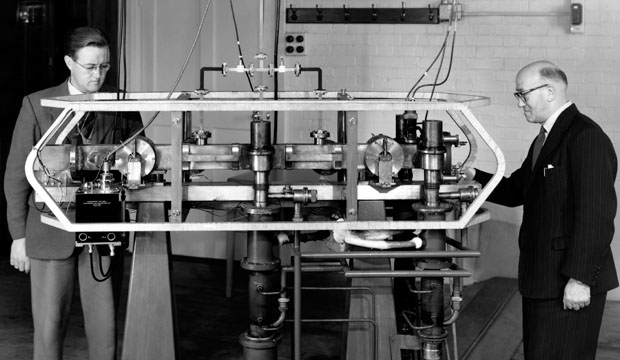
Louis Essen (right) and Jack Parry (left) standing next to the world's first caesium-133 atomic clock.

Essen earned his PhD (1941) and Doctor of Science (1948) from the University of London before becoming interested in the possibility of using the frequency of atomic spectra to improve time measurement. The feasibility of measuring time using caesium as an atomic reference had been demonstrated by the US National Bureau of Standards. In 1955, he developed, in collaboration with Jack Parry, the first practical atomic clock by integrating the caesium atomic standard with conventional quartz crystal oscillators to allow calibration of existing time-keeping.

== Time standards ==
This work led Essen to champion the caesium spectrum as an international time standard. The ammonia molecule had already been proposed as such but Essen was convinced that caesium would prove more stable. However, the International Astronomical Union meeting in Rome in 1952 had adopted the ephemeris time scale, on a proposal by Gerald Clemence defining the time unit in terms of the Earth's motion round the sun. The ephemeris second, based on a fraction of the tropical year derived from Simon Newcomb's expression for the mean solar motion, became a standard in 1960, but in 1967, at the 13th Conférence Générale des Poids et Mesures, the second was redefined in terms of a value for the ephemeris second that had been precisely measured by Essen in collaboration with William Markowitz of the United States Naval Observatory in terms of the frequency of a chosen line from the spectrum of caesium.

== Later life ==
Essen spent all his working life at the National Physical Laboratory.

In 1971 he published The Special Theory of Relativity: A Critical Analysis, questioning Special relativity, which apparently was not appreciated by his employers. Essen said in 1978:

No one has attempted to refute my arguments, but I was warned that if I persisted I was likely to spoil my career prospects.

He retired in 1972 and died in Great Bookham, Surrey in 1997.

== Awards and honours ==
- A.S. Popov Gold Medal from the USSR Academy of Sciences (1959)
- O.B.E. (1959)
- Fellow of the Royal Society (1960)
- Rabi Award of the IEEE Ultrasonics, Ferroelectrics, and Frequency Control Society (1987)
