= Vershire, Vermont =

- Town
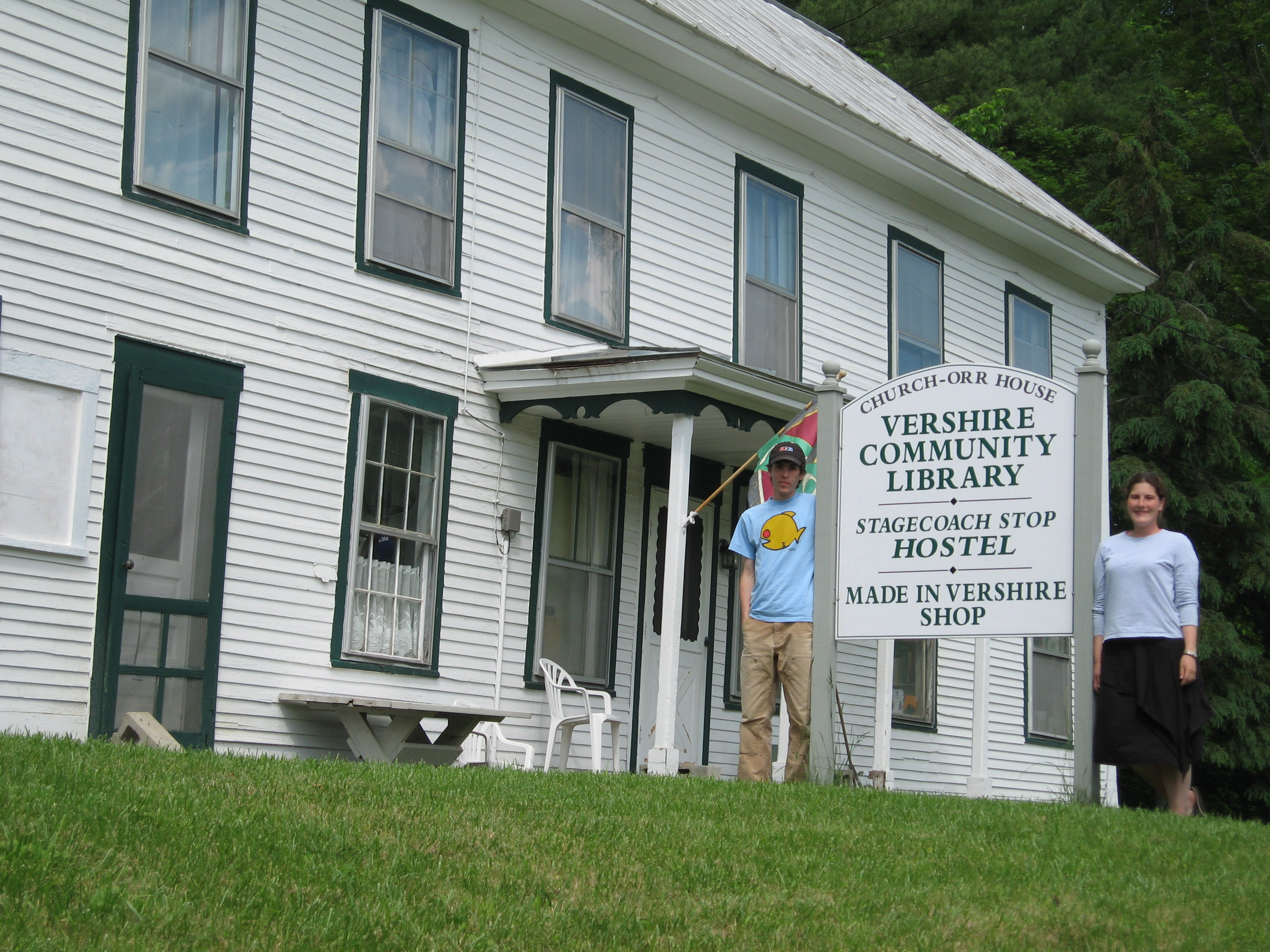
- Vershire library

- Logo

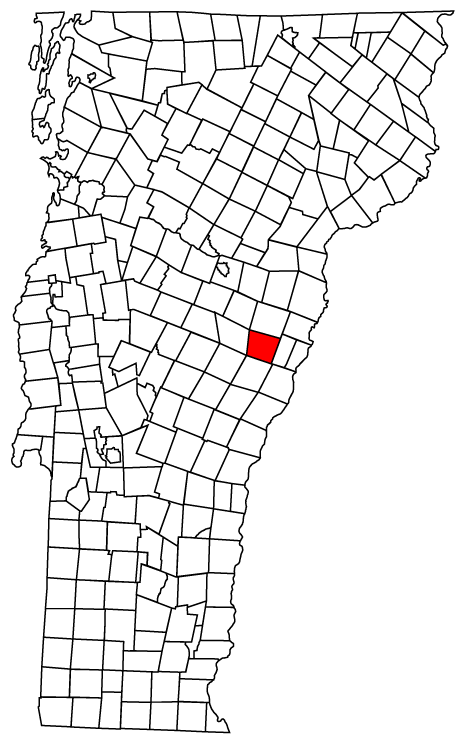
- Located in Orange County, Vermont
- Coordinates: 43°58′30″N 72°19′15″W
- Country: United States
- State: Vermont
- County: Orange
- Chartered: 1781
- Communities: Vershire; Mill Village; South Vershire; Vershire Heights

Area
  - Total: 36.5 sq mi (94.6 km^{2})
  - Land: 36.5 sq mi (94.5 km^{2})
  - Water: 0.039 sq mi (0.1 km^{2})
- Elevation: 1,604 ft (489 m)

Population (2020)
  - Total: 672
  - Density: 18/sq mi (7.1/km^{2})
  - Households: 286
  - Families: 184
- Time zone: UTC-5 (EST)
  - Summer (DST): UTC-4 (EDT)
- ZIP Codes: 05079 (Vershire); 05072 (Strafford)
- Area code: 802
- FIPS code: 50-74950
- GNIS feature ID: 1462235
- Website: vershirevt.org

Vershire is a town in Orange County, Vermont, United States, created under Vermont Charter of August 3, 1781. The population was 672 at the 2020 census. The name Vershire is a portmanteau of Vermont and New Hampshire.

== History ==
The town and a village were renamed "Ely" in 1880 after the Ely Mining Company, which mined copper. This changed in 1883, when 200 miners seized the plant demanding back wages. Five companies of the National Guard were called out to suppress the miners. It is the home of The Mountain School of Milton Academy, a selective independent semester program that provides academically motivated high school juniors from across the country the opportunity to live and work on a farm.

== Geography ==
According to the United States Census Bureau, the town has a total area of 36.5 square miles (94.6 km^{2}), of which 36.5 square miles (94.5 km^{2}) is land and 0.04 square mile (0.1 km^{2}) (0.05%) is water. The headwaters of the Ompompanoosuc River are located in the town.

== Demographics ==
Historical population
Census	Pop.	Note	%±
1790	439		—
1800	1,031		134.9%
1810	1,311		27.2%
1820	1,296		−1.1%
1830	1,260		−2.8%
1840	1,098		−12.9%
1850	1,071		−2.5%
1860	1,054		−1.6%
1870	1,140		8.2%
1880	1,875		64.5%
1890	754		−59.8%
1900	641		−15.0%
1910	448		−30.1%
1920	410		−8.5%
1930	368		−10.2%
1940	367		−0.3%
1950	284		−22.6%
1960	236		−16.9%
1970	299		26.7%
1980	442		47.8%
1990	560		26.7%
2000	629		12.3%
2010	730		16.1%
2020	672		−7.9%
U.S. Decennial Census

As of the census of 2000, there were 629 people, 261 households, and 174 families residing in the town. The population density was 17.2 people per square mile (6.7/km^{2}). There were 378 housing units at an average density of 10.4 per square mile (4.0/km^{2}). The racial makeup of the town was 98.25% White, 0.32% African American, 0.16% Native American, 0.32% Asian, 0.48% from other races, and 0.48% from two or more races. Hispanic or Latino of any race were 0.32% of the population.

There were 261 households, out of which 33.3% had children under the age of 18 living with them, 55.2% were couples living together and joined in either marriage or civil union, 8.0% had a female householder with no husband present, and 33.3% were non-families. 26.8% of all households were made up of individuals, and 6.1% had someone living alone who was 65 years of age or older. The average household size was 2.41 and the average family size was 2.94.

In the town, the population was spread out, with 26.6% under the age of 18, 4.8% from 18 to 24, 32.4% from 25 to 44, 25.8% from 45 to 64, and 10.5% who were 65 years of age or older. The median age was 38 years. For every 100 females, there were 97.8 males. For every 100 females age 18 and over, there were 94.1 males.

The median income for a household in the town was $37,132, and the median income for a family was $40,714. Males had a median income of $31,833 versus $25,000 for females. The per capita income for the town was $16,161. About 11.4% of families and 13.4% of the population were below the poverty line, including 18.4% of those under age 18 and 18.6% of those age 65 or over.

== Education ==
Residents are in the Rivendell Interstate School District.

== Notable people ==
- Fanny Titus Hazen, Civil War nurse
- Marion Pritchard, rescuer of Dutch Jews during World War II
