= Hannah Judkins Starbird =

American army nurse

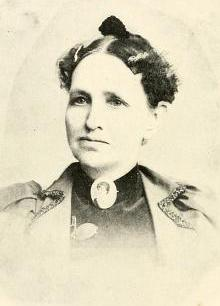
- Hannah Judkins Starbird, from an 1895 publication.
- Born: Hannah Elizabeth Judkins; August 10, 1832; Skowhegan, Maine
- Died: February 15, 1922; Los Angeles, California

Hannah Elizabeth Judkins Starbird (August 10, 1832 – February 15, 1922) served as an army nurse in the American Civil War. Later she was an officer of the National Association of Army Nurses of the Civil War.

== Early life ==
Hannah Judkins was born August 10, 1832, in Skowhegan, Maine, the daughter of Levi Judkins and Hannah Emery Judkins. Her grandfather, John Emery, fought in the American Revolutionary War.

== Career ==
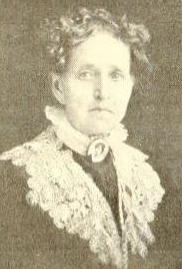
Hannah Judkins Starbird, from a 1910 publication. Note that she is wearing the same portrait brooch as above.

Judkins was a schoolteacher in Maine for nine years before the war. She became an army nurse in 1864, working at Carver Hospital in Washington, D.C. and St. John's College Hospital in Annapolis, Maryland until the war's end in 1865. Her patients at St. John's were Union Army men, newly released from Confederate prisons. She wrote, "Pen cannot describe the first boat-load of half-starved, half-clothed, thin, emaciated forms whose feet, tied up in rags, left footprints of blood as they marched along to be washed and dressed for the wards. In many cases their minds were demented, and they could give no information as to friends or home, and died in that condition, their graves being marked 'Unknown'."

In 1910 she was elected junior vice-president of the National Association of Army Nurses of the Civil War. In 1913, she was section president of the Army Nurses' Association in California and Arizona.

== Personal life ==
Hannah Judkins married lawyer and Union Army veteran Solomon Bates Starbird in 1866. They lived in Nebraska and Colorado, and had two sons, Edwin P. and Harold B. (Harry). Both sons graduated from the Colorado School of Mines. Solomon Starbird died in 1889. Hannah Judkins Starbird lived in Nevada and California in her later years, and died on February 15, 1922, aged 89 years, in Los Angeles, California. Her gravesite is at Angelus-Rosedale Cemetery. In 1998, she was one of the nurses featured in an exhibit at the Bangor Historical Society on "Maine Women in the Civil War".
