= Clarissa F. Dye =

American Civil War nurse (1832-1921)

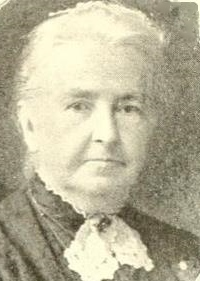
- Clarissa F. Dye, from a 1910 publication
- Born: Clara Fellows Jones; November 28, 1832; Philadelphia, Pennsylvania, U.S.
- Died: May 3, 1921 (aged 88); Philadelphia, Pennsylvania, U.S.
- Resting place: West Laurel Hill Cemetery, Bala Cynwyd, Pennsylvania, U.S.
- Occupations: Teacher, army nurse

Clarissa Fellows Jones Dye (November 28, 1832 – May 3, 1921) was an American nurse who volunteered during the American Civil War. She served as president of the National Association of Army Nurses of the Civil War from 1906 to 1909.

== Early life ==
She was born Clarissa Fellows Jones, in Philadelphia to Thomas and Lydia Jones.

== Civil War nursing ==
When the Civil War began in 1861, Clara Jones was a single teacher at the Rittenhouse Grammar School for Girls in Germantown, Pennsylvania. She had no training or experience as a nurse, but she was willing and able to clean rooms, wash linens, prepare food, knit socks, pray with dying men and sing in prayer meetings.

In the fall of 1861, she worked at the Christian Street Hospital in Philadelphia. During her winter break from school, she traveled to army encampments near Washington D.C. and Alexandria, Virginia, to cook, care, and visit with wounded soldiers in regimental hospitals. In the summer of 1862, she worked on a hospital steamer, State of Maine, and cared for both Union and Confederate wounded and prisoners of war being transported between Virginia and Maryland.

After the State of Maine was decommissioned as a hospital ship, she visited Dorothea Dix, the Superintendent of Nurses, in Washington D.C. to ask for an assignment but was rejected due to her limited availability. She persisted and a contact at the Surgeon General's office placed her at the Lyceum Building, a public lecture hall converted into a hospital in Alexandria, Virginia.

She delivered twenty barrels of donations from her students to the Lyceum Building. In October 1862, she contracted typhoid fever and returned to Philadelphia to teach at the Rittenhouse Grammar School for Girls. After her convalescence, she returned to the Lyceum Building and cooked a Thanksgiving dinner for approximately 80 men.

On July 19, 1863, she arrived at the site of the Battle of Gettysburg by train from Baltimore. She worked in the Second Corps hospital which had approximately 500 patients including 100 Confederate soldiers. By August 6, all patients at the Second Corps hospital had been transferred to hospitals in nearby major cities. Dye and two friends returned to Baltimore to collect supplies and deliver them to Rappahannock Station where the Army of the Potomac distributed food and medical supplies.

In December 1863, she traveled to Brandy Station, Virginia, to deliver food and medicine to the Union soldiers. She met Cornelia Hancock who was also a volunteer nurse and they formed a close friendship. She claimed to be the only woman to receive a Medal of Honor during the Civil War.

After the war, Clarissa F. Dye was active in the Woman's Permanent Emergency Association of Germantown, the Women's Home Missionary Society, and the American Red Cross. She helped distribute supplies to the victims of the Johnstown Flood and to American soldiers in Cuba during the Spanish-American War. She was president of the National Association of Army Nurses of the Civil War from 1906 to 1909. As president she advocated for nurses' pensions, and gathered data on surviving war nurses to report the need to Congress. "I plead for the poor, aged woman who nursed back to life many a sick and wounded hero of the battlefield. The government should certainly make provision for them," she declared in 1907.

Dye published her memoirs of her wartime nursing service, and attended Encampments, including the fortieth and fiftieth anniversary observances at Gettysburg. Because her time in war nursing was unpaid and limited by her teaching schedule, Dye was not able to prove her own wartime service for the purpose of a pension many years later, when she was in need. "I have no income and sorely need what I believe to be due to my service for the government", she wrote to the federal pension bureau in 1916. A 1919 newspaper story about her memories of Abraham Lincoln concluded, "Mrs. Dye has been trying since 1905 to obtain a pension from the government, but never has succeeded."

== Personal life ==
In 1864, Jones left war nursing to care for her dying sister Elizabeth Jones Logan. She adopted her sister's three young daughters, Lydia, Elizabeth, and Clarissa. She married surveyor John H. Dye, a widower with four children, in 1872. The Dyes and Logans lived in Germantown. Dye was widowed in 1906, and she died at home in 1921, aged 89 years, from kidney failure. She was interred at West Laurel Hill Cemetery in Bala Cynwyd, Pennsylvania.
