= Emily E. Woodley =

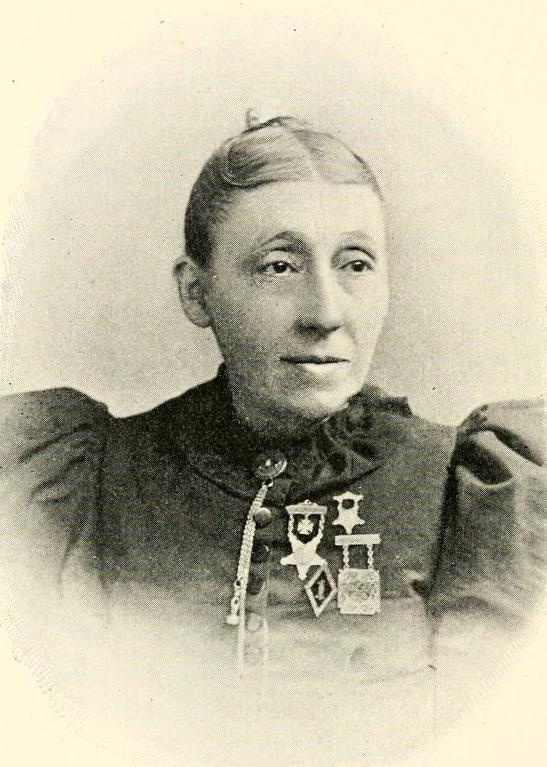
- Emily E. Woodley, from an 1897 publication.
- Born: Emily Lansbury; May 26, 1835; Philadelphia, Pennsylvania
- Died: May 15, 1908 (aged 72); Philadelphia, Pennsylvania
- Known for: Nurse during the American Civil War

Emily E. Lansbury Wilson Woodley (May 26, 1835 – May 15, 1908) was an army nurse during the American Civil War, president of the National Association of Army Nurses of the Civil War from 1895 to 1898.

== Early life ==
Emily E. Lansbury was born on May 26, 1835, in Philadelphia, the daughter of Jeremiah Lansbury and Eliza Reed Lansbury. Her grandfather John R. Reed served in the American Revolutionary War.

== Civil War nurse ==
Woodley had done nursing work during the 1852 cholera epidemic in Philadelphia, and enrolled in a nurses' training course in 1858. In 1861, she joined the army as one of the "Keystone Daughters", a group of Philadelphia nurses who organized for war service in 1861.

Emily "Mother" Wilson was a nurse for the entire duration of the American Civil War, from 1861 to 1865. She served at the scene of 33 battles. "What terrible, terrible days they were, it almost makes me shudder when I recall some of those thrilling times. It would be a terrible thing to live them over again," she said in 1898. She was commissioned as a captain in the United States Army by Abraham Lincoln, and awarded a medal by the Secretary of War, Edwin Stanton. She was granted a lifetime pension after the war.

Woodley was an organizer of the National Association of Army Nurses of the Civil War, and served as the organization's president from 1895 to 1898. As president, she endorsed a plan for building a home for army nurses in Philadelphia, and worked for the state pensions of army nurses. "What we want," she explained in 1903, "is to have Pennsylvania contribute something to the support, in their declining years, of the old women surviving the noble army of nurses who marched with the soldiers of this State, faced all diseases, endured all hardships and braved ever danger during the Civil War."

Woodley was on the board of managers of a home for veterans and their wives in Philadelphia. She attended veterans' events, including the 1895 Encampment in Washington, D.C., and the 1907 Encampment at Saratoga Springs, New York. At the 1899 Encampment in Philadelphia, she was honored as the last surviving member of the Keystone Daughters, and she donated space in Fernwood Cemetery for a plaque in memory of the group.

Chapters of the Daughters of Union Veterans of the Civil War in Pennsylvania and California were named for Woodley.

== Personal life ==
Woodley died on May 15, 1908, aged 72 years, in Philadelphia. Her remains were buried with military honors. Her grandson, William D. Woodley of West Philadelphia, survived her.
