= Elizabeth Wendell Ewing =

American nurse in the American Civil War

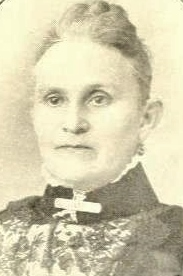
- Ewing from a 1910 publication
- Born: Elizabeth Wendell Hunter; February 5, 1841; Valley Forge, Pennsylvania
- Died: April 30, 1905; Phoenixville, Pennsylvania
- Notable work: President of the National Association of Army Nurses of the Civil War

Elizabeth Wendell Hunter Ewing (February 5, 1841 – April 30, 1905) served as a nurse during the American Civil War, and later as president of the National Association of Army Nurses of the Civil War.

== Early life ==
Elizabeth Wendell Hunter was born February 5, 1841, in Valley Forge, Pennsylvania.

== Career ==
Ewing served as an army nurse from 1862 to 1863 during the American Civil War. Her husband was wounded at Malvern Hill and she traveled with her very young son, to find him at a military hospital in Baltimore. Dorothea Dix initially refused Ewing for the Army nursing corps, but she persisted, and was enrolled in time to help her husband recover. She continued at the hospital as an army nurse for almost a year.

Ewing was a delegate to the annual convention of the Woman's Relief Corps in 1893, and in 1896 she was elected vice-president of the Woman's Relief Corps at the Pennsylvania Encampment, held in Chambersburg. In 1897 and 1898 she was senior vice-president and in 1899 she was president of the National Association of Army Nurses of the Civil War.

== Personal life ==
Elizabeth Wendell Hunter married Immanuel Ewing (1830–1917), who owned a clothing store. They had a son born in 1861, and a daughter Gertrude born in 1872. Elizabeth Wendell Ewing died in 1905, in Phoenixville, Pennsylvania, aged 64 years.
