= John H. Dye =

American civil engineer and surveyor

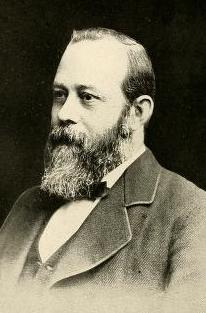
- John H. Dye, from a 1912 publication.
- Born: September 9, 1833; Kensington, Philadelphia, Pennsylvania
- Died: April 8, 1906 (aged 72); Germantown, Philadelphia, Pennsylvania
- Spouse(s): Emily deCamp Dye; Clarissa F. Dye (married 1872-1906)

John Henry Dye (September 9, 1833 – April 8, 1906) was an American civil engineer and surveyor based in Philadelphia, Pennsylvania. His 1869 city map, made with printer Henry J. Toudy, has been described as "a major milestone in the urban mapping of Philadelphia."

== Early life ==
John H. Dye was born in Kensington, Pennsylvania, the son of William Dye and Christiana Eggleston (or Egglington) Dye. He studied civil engineering with his uncle, James P. Davis.

== Career ==
Dye worked under the Chief Engineer of Philadelphia, Strickland Kneass, and signed as a witness on Kneass's patent application for a sewer valve in 1861. He served as a lieutenant in the Union Army during the American Civil War. In 1865, he was appointed to create the Registry Bureau of the Philadelphia Survey Department, and he ran the bureau as registrar until 1896. In an 1880 letter, Dye criticized a humorous map his office had received, joining in on the joke: "I claim to be able, in a general way, to make a map; but the map of Delaware Bay which you send me, is a huckleberry above my persimmon; I may have seen worse maps, but if I did, the time has slipped my memory."

In 1885 he was elected chairman of the city's Engineers' Club. He was also on the board of directors of the Danville and Riverside Street Railway Company that year, and served on the board of directors of the Williamsport and North Branch Railroad Company. He had an office in the Girard Building in Philadelphia in 1896.

Dye and Henry J. Toudy created a large-scale city map of Philadelphia in 1869, considered a major production in the history of the city's maps. Few copies of this map are known to survive; one is in the Historical Society of Pennsylvania, one is at the Huntington Library, and one is at the Bibliothèque nationale de France.

== Personal life ==
John H. Dye married twice. His first wife was Emily deCamp Dye; they had four children (Strickland, Horatio, John, and Emily) before she died in the spring of 1872. At the end of that year, he married Civil War nurse and schoolteacher Clarissa F. Dye. John H. Dye died in 1906, aged 72, in Germantown.

== Selected maps and surveys by Dye ==
- Dye's 1887 survey of the Schuykill River and Shawmont Pumping Station, online at the Greater Philadelphia GeoHistory Network website.
- A historical map of Philadelphia city lots, by John H. Dye, based on records from 1781 and 1803, is in the collection of the Historical Society of Pennsylvania; the society also holds an 1859 survey by Dye for a street railroad.
- An original copy of Dye's Plan of lots laid out for John Pitcairn at Huntingdon Valley, Montgomery Co., PA (1897) is in the Raymond and Mildred Pitcairn Archives, Glencairn Museum, Bryn Athyn, Pennsylvania.
