= Alice Cary Risley =

American nurse

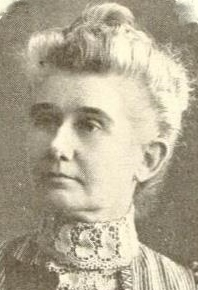
- Born: November 1, 1847; Wilmington
- Died: 1939 (aged 91–92); Alexandria
- Occupation: Nurse

Alice Cary Risley (November 1, 1847 – 1939) of Columbia, Missouri, was a nurse during the American Civil War. She was the last surviving member of the National Association of Civil War Nurses. Her mother, Phoebe Farmer, was a cousin of Alice and Phoebe Cary.

== Biography ==
Born Alice Cary Farmer on November 1, 1847, in Wilmington, Ohio. Her father, Franklin Farmer, had been forced to leave their family home in New Iberia, Louisiana when the war broke out due to their politics.

Her father joined the Union Army and the family moved to New Orleans, following the underground railroad. She began service as a nurse in New Orleans at about the age of 15.

In 1874, in St. Louis, Missouri, Alice married Samuel A. Risley, a former Union soldier whom she had nursed. He founded the Southern Missouri Journal. Later Risley and her husband served together as postmaster and postmistress of Howell County, Missouri.

Risley was the last surviving member of the National Association of Civil War Nurses, which dissolved on her death.

She is mentioned in the St. Louis Globe-Democrat of July 27, 1930. She was president of the National Association of Army Nurses of the Civil War. She died in 1939 at the home of her son, Guy, in Alexandria, Louisiana.
