= Margaret Hamilton (nurse) =

American nurse (1840–1922)

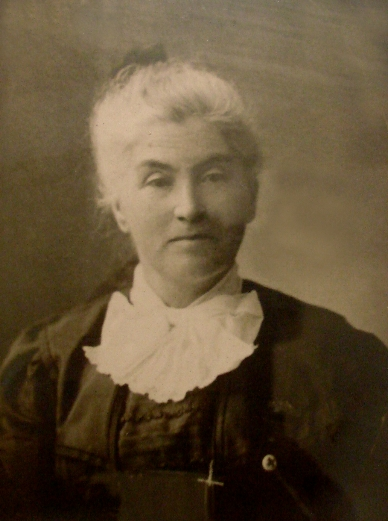
Margaret Hamilton

Margaret Hamilton (October 19, 1840 – January 11, 1922) was a Union nurse during the American Civil War.

== Early life ==
Hamilton was born October 19, 1840, in Rochester, New York. She was the only child of Cornelius and Mary (née Sheehan) Mahoney. Cornelius was the son of Dennis Mahoney and his wife, Margaret Hamilton was quite close to both of her parents until her mother's death in 1857. She was educated at the public schools and St. Joseph's Seminary in Emmitsburg, Maryland. At the seminary, she joined Sisters of Charity, even though her father did not approve.

== Religious life ==
In 1860, Hamilton entered an orphan asylum in Albany, New York, aspiring to be a sister. She experienced a three-month probation period, after which she was sent to the Mother House in Emmitsburg, Maryland, for instruction. After six months, Hamilton was given the habit of the Order, and sent her to an orphanage in Albany to teach.

== Civil War service ==
In spring of 1862, Hamilton and three other religious sisters received an order from the Mother House to go to the Satterlee General Hospital in West Philadelphia. Hamilton arrived for service in early May; the hospital at the time was newly established and poorly supplied. Only a few days after she began her service, Hamilton witnessed the consequences of so few resources as hundreds of soldiers arrived from the various battles around the Chickahominy River.

Due to the lack of personnel and resources, Hamilton was constantly overworked until her own health began to fail; the battle of Gettysburg specifically placed a strain on the hospital capacities. Among her other services at the hospital, Hamilton volunteered to nurse in the isolated smallpox ward.

One instance specifically stands out in Hamilton's service. The hospital received many people injured at the battle of the Wilderness, and this included a young woman soldier. Disguised as a man, the soldier's sex was only discovered upon admittance to the hospital for treatment. It was said she followed a lover into battle, and exhibited incredible bravery; she had even reached the rank of lieutenant.

== After the war ==
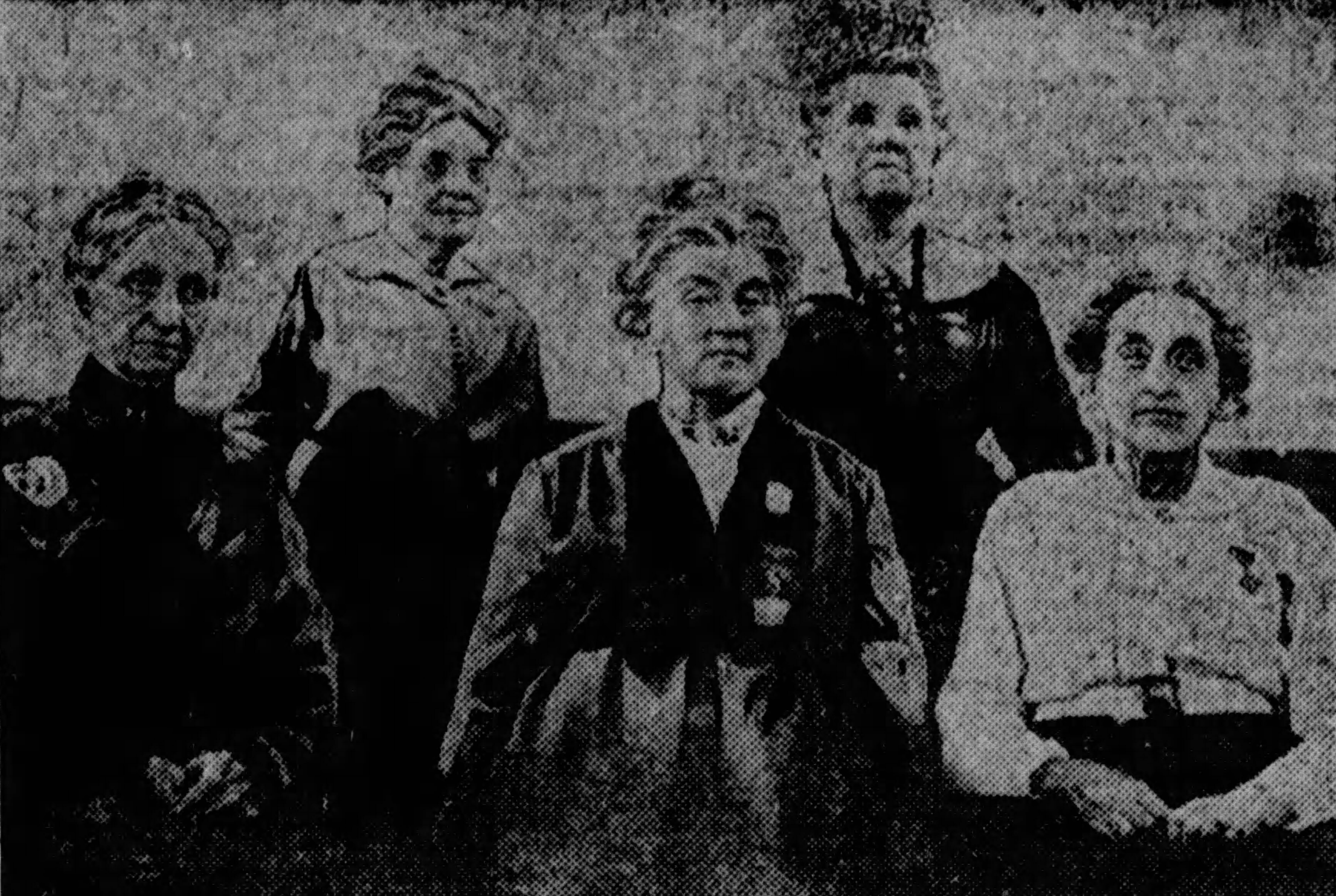
Five American Civil War nurses at 1916 Massachusetts encampment, left to right: Helen E. Smith, Susan C. Mills, Margaret Hamilton, Mary E. Smith, and Lovisa Tyson.

Hamilton left the service due to her own poor health in November 1864. Upon leaving the service, Hamilton also left the Sisters of Charity. She married a soldier of the 19th Maine Volunteer Infantry Regiment, Charles Roberts Hamilton, in November 1864, and the two had eight children together. Charles Roberts Hamilton was the youngest of thirteen children born to Daniel and Esther (Roberts) Hamilton of Belfast, Maine and later Swanville, Maine. Charles died April 9, 1900.

Hamilton ultimately left the Catholic Church and became a Baptist.

She was elected chaplain of the H. M. Warren Relief Corps of Wakefield, Massachusetts, for several years. In 1897 she was chosen secretary of the Massachusetts Army Nurse Association upon its formation. She was president of the National Association of Army Nurses of the Civil War, elected at the 1902 national meeting. She was a member of the Ladies Aid Association of the Massachusetts Soldiers' Home.

Hamilton died on January 11, 1922.

== Sources ==
- Woman's Relief Corps, Journal of the 43rd Annual Convention of the Department of Massachusetts, Woman's Relief Corps, Auxiliary to the Grand Army of the Republic. E. B. Stillings, 1922.
- Howe, Julia Ward, and Mary Hannah Graves, eds. Representative Women of New England. New England Historical Publishing Company, 1904. pp. 301–303.
