= Tericka Dye =

American former pornographic actress

Tericka Dye (born 1972/1973) is an American former pornographic actress who performed under the stage name of Rikki Andersin. Later known by the name Tera Myers, she made national headlines when, after retiring from the adult industry and becoming a high school science teacher in Kentucky, her brief pornographic career was discovered, leading to her dismissal.

== Film career ==
Dye said she became involved in pornography while working as an impoverished exotic dancer in California. After serving in the U.S. Army, Dye did a few movies in 1997, including Amazing's Tight Ass. Afterward, she re-enlisted. She was stationed at Fort Lewis as a member of the Military Police in the Army's Regional Confinement Facility. She appeared in a few more films after this, including Cream Entertainment Group's Major Slut, and was a contract star for Cream Entertainment. Dye appeared in at least eleven adult films overall. She later revealed that she suffered from bipolar disorder and appeared in her first pornographic movie at the age of 22 as a homeless and unemployed mother of two. She said she used a pseudonym during filming and that "I absolutely 100% regret doing that. I've always tried to look ahead and not focus on it. But I wasn't diagnosed at the time."

== Education and teaching career ==
Dye rejoined the Army after leaving the pornography industry and used the GI Bill to attend college. Dye received a bachelor's degree from Murray State University and spent time as a science teacher at Marshall County High School in Benton, Kentucky, where she once lived.

=== Dismissal from Reidland High School, 2006 ===
Dye was a science teacher and volleyball coach at Reidland High School in Paducah, Kentucky until 2006 when school officials learned of her pornographic video appearances. According to Ynot.com, "Dye was suspended from work, banned from school property, her contract not renewed once it expired, and she was never given a public hearing because she was paid through the end of her contract." School officials said her presence would disrupt the learning environment, but Dye said that she would be a good example to students since she had "risen above a troubled childhood with an alcoholic father" and turned her life around despite having bipolar disorder; she also said she needed the money to care for her four children.

The case drew national attention after Dye appeared on Dr. Phil to discuss her dismissal from the school. In May 2006 she said, "I'm a girl from the wrong side of the tracks who's made a lot of bad decisions in life. Anybody who's been in my classroom could tell you how much I love teaching and how much I love these students, and that should be what matters more than anything in my past." She received support from parents and other educators. In 2007 Dye's lawyer confirmed she would not pursue the appeal of a lawsuit against the McCracken County Public Schools and was moving out of Kentucky, though he did not disclose where.

=== Resignation from Parkway North High School, 2011 ===
Dye later worked as a teacher and girls' volleyball coach in the Parkway School District in St. Louis under the name Tera Myers.

In March 2011, Don Senti, interim district superintendent, said Dye was on administrative leave from her position at the school at her own request. Her decision, granted "out of respect for her privacy and that of her family," came after a student inquired about her appearance in a pornographic video. According to Parkway School District spokesperson Paul Tandy, Dye "was concerned about the impact [her past] would have in the building", and, on March 4, informed the school's principal after being confronted by the student.

The district said Dye had passed background checks before being hired as a teacher in 2007, but it did not know about her past until the student found out about it online, because the activity was legal and her references did not discuss it. A district representative said Parkway contacted the Kentucky school to verify her references in 2007, and no mention of her suspension or stint in porn was made.

It was announced that Dye would continue to be paid until the end of the semester, at which time she was to leave the Parkway School District. "We're surprised, very surprised," said Tandy. "At the same time, we feel for her and her family. We do believe she has tried to move on with her life ... Unfortunately, even though it happened 15 years ago, [the video] is still there." Students continued to defend her in 2011.
