= Teddy Dye =

New Zealand trade unionist

The Honourable Teddy Dye

Member of the New Zealand Legislative Council
- In office 9 March 1936 – 25 January 1942

Member of the Waihi Borough Council
- In office 29 July 1937 – 17 May 1941

Personal details
- Born: Edward Dye; 7 August 1879 Timaru, New Zealand
- Died: 25 January 1942 (aged 62) Auckland, New Zealand
- Party: Labour
- Occupation: Miner; trade unionist; dairy farmer

Edward Dye (7 August 1879 – 25 January 1942) was a New Zealand trade unionist and miner.

Dye was born in Timaru, and lived in Australia as a youth. He was president for twenty years of the Ohinemuri Miners' Union and the New Zealand Gold Mine Employees' Federation. Blacklisted after the 1912 Waihi miners' strike, he broke in a dairy farm from the bush for eight years before returning to the Waihi gold mines.

On 29 July 1937, Dye was elected a member of the Waihi Borough Council. He was re-elected for a further three years at the local elections the following year, but stood down at the 1941 local elections.

Dye was a member of the New Zealand Legislative Council, appointed by the Labour Government, from 9 March 1936 to 25 January 1942, when he died from miner's phthisis.
