= David Dyer =

David Dyer may refer to:

- David Dyer (cricketer) (born 1946), South African cricketer
- David Patterson Dyer (1838–1924), U.S. federal judge
- David W. Dyer (1910–1998), American lawyer and judge
