= Rebecca Lane Pennypacker Price =

American nurse (1837–1919)

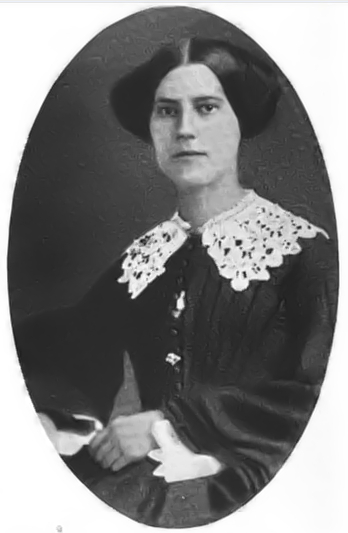
- Born: September 8, 1837; Phoenixville, Pennsylvania
- Died: May 17, 1919 (aged 81)
- Occupation: Nurse
- Known for: President of the National Association of Army Nurses of the Civil War

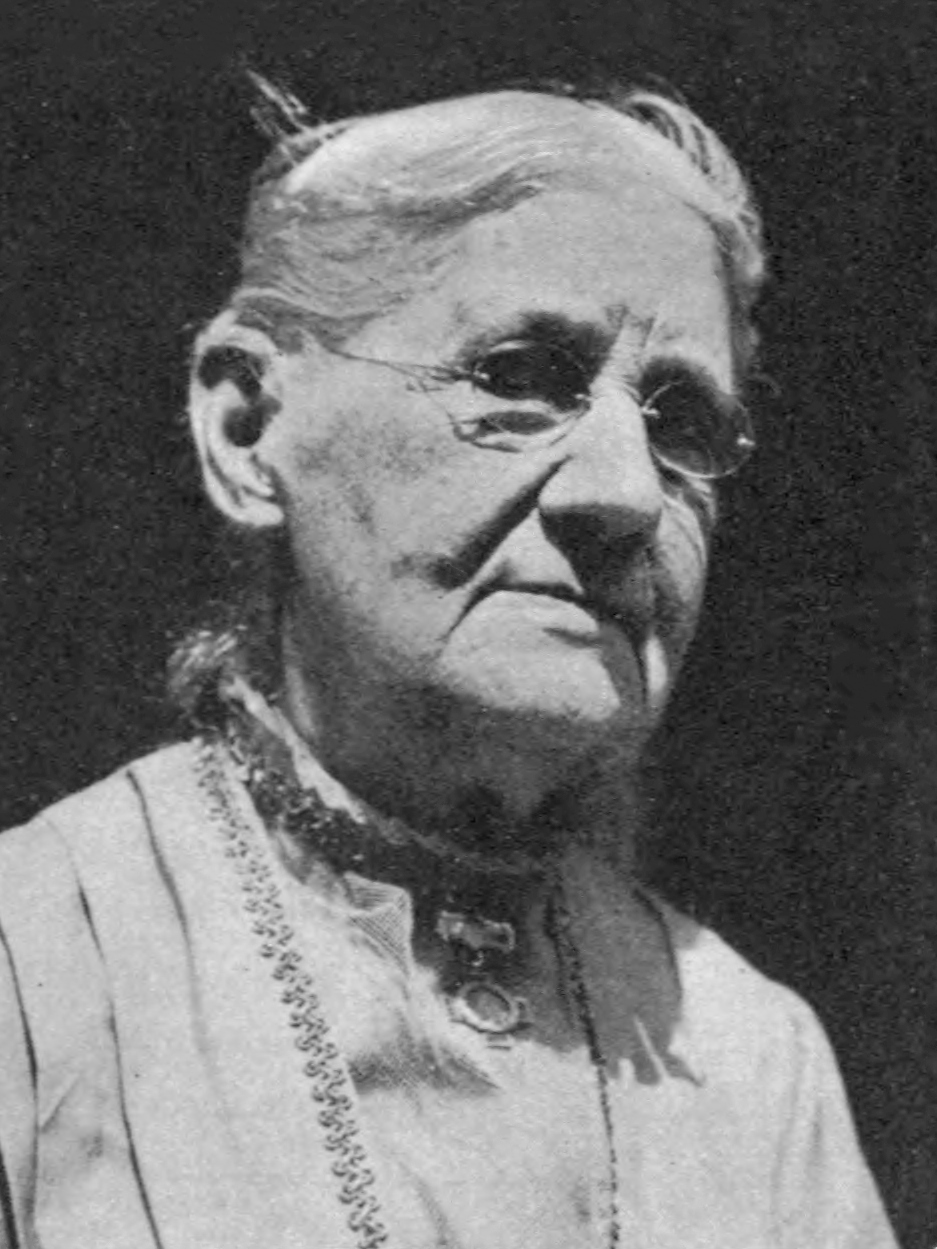
Rebecca L. Price, from a 1914 publication.

Rebecca Lane Pennypacker Price (September 8, 1837 – May 17, 1919) was a nurse who served in the American Civil War, and was the penultimate president of the National Association of Army Nurses of the Civil War in 1914.

== Early life ==
Rebecca Lane Pennypacker was born in Phoenixville, Pennsylvania, the daughter of Mathias Showalter Pennypacker and Elizabeth Buckwalter Pennypacker. Her mother was a hospital matron during the American Civil War. Governor Samuel W. Pennypacker was her first cousin; General Galusha Pennypacker was another cousin.

== Career ==
Rebecca L. Price was a leader of the Phoenixville Union Relief Society at the beginning the American Civil War, organizing sewists and knitters, running donation drives, and delivering supplies to troops. She was given a travel pass by Pennsylvania's governor Andrew Gregg Curtin to facilitate her work. She volunteered as a nurse at hospitals in Virginia, Baltimore and Philadelphia. She rode a cattle car to offer compassionate care to badly wounded soldiers and replenish clothing, bandages, food, and other provisions after the Battle of Gettysburg.

Later in life, Price was a manager of the Baptist Institute for Christian Workers in Philadelphia. She remained active with the Civil War nursing organizations, and in 1914 and 1915 was the president of the National Association of Army Nurses of the Civil War. As president, she spoke to a gathering of Civil War veterans on the 50th anniversary of the war's end in 1915, saying "We can do much to lead the rising generation to see horrors of war rather than its glories that they may give their lives to preserve these blessings through peace. Peace is what we want, and not war."

== Personal life ==
Rebecca Lane Pennypacker married Edwin Price in 1859. They had two children, a son, George E. Price (1874–1951), and a daughter, Cora Price (later Bowen) (1869–1961). Rebecca L. Price was widowed in 1914 and died in 1919, aged 81 years, at her home in Pottstown, Pennsylvania.

In 2015, the Phoenixville Historical Society marked Armed Forces Day with an event honoring Rebecca Lane Pennypacker Price's contributions as a nurse in the American Civil War.
