= David William Dye =

English physicist (1887 – 1932)

David William Dye FRS (30 December 1887 – 18 February 1932) was an English physicist.

He was born the third son of Alderman Charles Dye, who was the mayor of Portsmouth in 1906. After attending the local technical college in Portsmouth he studied for a BSc at London University. He then served an apprenticeship at the British Thomson-Houston Company at Rugby before joining the National Physical Laboratory in 1910, where he was appointed head of the Electrical Standards and Measurements Section in 1919.

He developed techniques for the use of tuning forks as a precision timing standard when maintained in continuous vibration, which provided a very accurate national standard wavemeter. The work led to the development of a standard clock accurate to one part in a million, a huge improvement over existing methods of measurement which were accurate to only one part in a thousand. He eventually turned to the piezo-electrical crystal to develop the first quartz clock. Louis Essen joined Dye's research group at the National Physical Laboratory in 1929 and went on to develop practical clocks after Dye's death.

By 1927, he had moved on to develop a magnetometer capable of measuring the vertical element of the Earth's magnetic field, which was so accurate that it was incorporated into the Abinger Magnetic Observatory.

In 1928, he was elected a Fellow of the Royal Society. His application citation stated that he

has established accurate and permanent standards of capacity and inductance suitable for radio frequencies, and has developed a self-contained standard of radio frequencies of high accuracy embodying a tuning fork control. Member of the National Committee for Wireless Telegraphy and of the International Committee for Radio Standards and Measurements. An authority on electrical standard measurements and precision measurements and on the magnetic properties of materials. Publications: - "Calculation of a Primary Standard of Mutual Inductance" (Proc Roy Soc, A 101); "The Valve maintained Tuning Fork as a Precision Time Standard" (ibid, A 103); "A Self-contained Standard Harmonic Wavemeter" (Phil Trans, A 224). Author of articles on Magnetic Measurements and on Radio Measurements in Glazebrook's Dictionary of Physics, and joint author of papers on magnetic measurements, measurement of high frequency current, &c.

== Bibliography ==
- Cook, A. (2001). "Time and the Royal Society". Notes and Records of the Royal Society. 55: 9–27. doi:10.1098/rsnr.2001.0123. S2CID 120948178.
- a., E. V. (1932). "David William Dye. 1887-1932". Obituary Notices of Fellows of the Royal Society. 1 (1): 75–78. doi:10.1098/rsbm.1932.0016. JSTOR 768964.
- Marrison, Warren A. (1948). "The Evolution of the quartz crystal clock". Bell System Technical Journal. 27 (3): 510–88. doi:10.1002/j.1538-7305.1948.tb01343.x. Archived from the original on 17 July 2011.
