= Cornelia Hancock =

American Civil War nurse

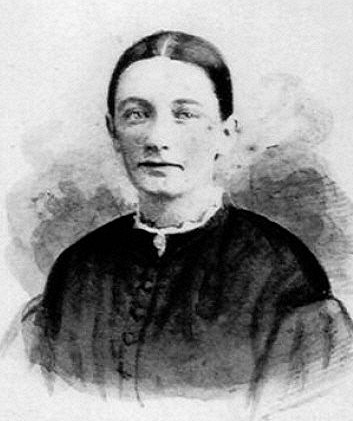
- Born: 8 February 1840; Hancock's Bridge, New Jersey, US
- Died: 31 December 1927 (aged 87); Atlantic City, New Jersey, US
- Resting place: Cedar Hills Friends Cemetery in Harmersville, New Jersey
- Occupation: Nurse
- Years active: 1863–1865
- Known for: Civil War nursing work

Cornelia Hancock (February 8, 1840 – December 31, 1927) was a celebrated volunteer nurse, serving the injured and infirmed of the Union Army during the American Civil War. Hancock's service lasted from July 6, 1863, to May 23, 1865.

== Early life ==
Hancock was born in the Hancock's Bridge section of Lower Alloways Creek Township, New Jersey, to Quakers of old colonial ancestry. The youngest of four children, Hancock was educated "in the Salem (county) academies." Her sister Ellen worked at the United States Mint in Philadelphia. Her only brother and her cousins joined the Union Army in 1862.

== Civil War service ==
Hancock's chance to serve came when her brother-in-law (Ellen's husband) Henry T. Child, a volunteer surgeon, offered to take her to the Gettysburg battlefield in July 1863.

However, Dorothea Dix, the superintendent of Union Army nurses, personally refused to enroll Hancock because she did not meet her requirements that the military's female nurses be "mature in years (at least 30), plain almost to homeliness in dress, and by no means liberally endowed with personal attractions.” In other words: at only 23, Hancock was too young and attractive to be an army nurse. Hancock was the only female nursing volunteer to be rejected.

Hancock went to Gettysburg anyway. "I got into Gettysburg the night of July sixth – where the need was so great that there was no further cavil about age,” she wrote in her journal. In a letter to her sister dated July 8, 1863, Hancock wrote, "We have been two days on the field; go about eight and come in about six—go in ambulances of army buggies...I feel assured I shall never feel horrifed at anything that may happen to me here-after." Hancock responded to an immense need: the Union lacked supplies as well as staff.

She had no formal training as a nurse; but after three weeks, she was tending to eight tenths of wounded. In October she tended to the large numbers of hungry and injured escaped slaves who were arriving in Washington, D.C. On February 10, 1864, Hancock joined the II Corps and served with them at the II Corps Hospital near Brandy Station, Virginia, at the Battle of the Wilderness and the Siege of Petersburg. She worked in the II Corps hospital at the Depot Field Hospital in City Point.

== Post-War ==
After the war, she opened a school for African Americans in Mount Pleasant, South Carolina. In Philadelphia, she founded several charity organizations. She was a board member of the Children's Aid Society 1883 to 1895 and helped children orphaned after the Johnstown Flood. She also served as president of the National Association of Army Nurses of the Civil War.

In 1914, Hancock retired to Atlantic City, New Jersey, to live with her niece. She died of nephritis in 1927, aged 87, and her ashes were buried at Cedar Hills Friends Cemetery in the Harmersville section of Lower Alloways Creek Township, New Jersey.

== Legacy ==
Her popular collection of wartime letters is no longer in print.

A commemorative flagstone was placed in her honor at the Lower Alloways Creek Friends Meeting House.
