= Caroline Burghardt =

American nurse and physician

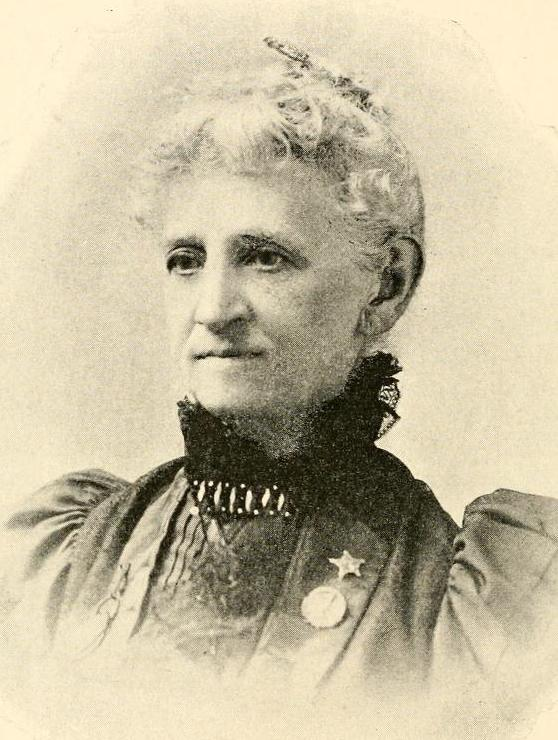
- Caroline Burghardt, from an 1897 publication.
- Born: June 10, 1834; Great Barrington, Massachusetts, US
- Died: February 6, 1922 (aged 87); Washington, D.C., US
- Known for: nurse in American Civil War, medical doctor, federal employee

Caroline Asenath Grant Burghardt (June 10, 1834 – February 6, 1922) was a Union nurse during the American Civil War, who later practiced as a medical doctor in Washington D.C.

== Early life ==
Burghardt was born in Great Barrington, Massachusetts, the daughter of John Budd Burghardt and Asenath Lucinda Grant. Her mother died when Caroline was a girl. She was working as a governess in New York at the outbreak of the Civil War. Poet and journalist William Cullen Bryant was an acquaintance of Burghardt's, and may have helped place her in a nursing role during the war.

== Civil War service ==
On April 19, 1861, Burghardt reported to Bellevue Hospital where she was accepted for nurse training by the board of surgeons. Her training lasted until June 8, 1861, when she traveled to Washington, D.C. to begin acting as a nurse in the war. Burghardt served as a nurse until September 6, 1865. She was stationed at numerous locations, such as Antietam, Gettysburg, Fortress Monroe, Winchester, and Alexandria. After Burghardt's service ended, Dorothea Dix composed a "testimony of hospital services" regarding Burghardt's work during the war. In this letter, Dix commented on Burghardt's "superior fidelity and skill."

== Career after the war ==
Burghardt continued her medical career well after the Civil War ended. In 1872, when she was 42 years old, Burghardt graduated from the medical school at Howard University. Afterwards, she practiced homeopathic medicine and began her own medical practice in Washington, D.C. She also held positions in the Treasury Department, the Commerce Department, and the Bureau of Navigation. She served a term as President of the Civil War Nurses' Association, and made appearances at Civil War commemorative events into the 1900s.

== Personal life ==
Burghardt received a pension of twelve dollars a month after February 28, 1891. She died in 1922, aged 87 years, in Washington D.C. Her grave is in Arlington National Cemetery.
