= David Dye (metallurgist) =

British metallurgists

Professor David Dye
- Education: University of Cambridge (BA, Ph.D)
- Scientific career
- Fields: nickel/cobalt Superalloys; Titanium and Zirconium alloys Micromechanics; Phase transformations Fatigue
- Institutions: Imperial College London
- Thesis: Mechanical effects arising from the welding of superalloys (2000)
- Doctoral advisor: Roger Reed
- Website: https://dyedavid.com/

David Dye is a Professor of Metallurgy at Imperial College London. Dye specialises in fatigue and micromechanics of aerospace and nuclear materials, mainly Ni/Co superalloys, titanium, TWIP steel, and Zirconium alloys.

== Life and career ==
=== Early life and education ===
Dye completed a Bachelor of Arts degree in Natural Sciences in 1997 at the University of Cambridge, followed by a PhD on the Mechanical effects of welding superalloys in 2000, supervised by Roger Reed.

=== Research and career ===
After graduating from the University of Cambridge, Dye worked for a short period as Junior Associate at Mitchell Madison Group from October 2000 until March 2001, before going back to the Department of Materials Science and Metallurgy, the University of Cambridge as a postdoctoral research associate also for a very short stint in 2001. He then joined the National Research Council (NRC) of Canada as Visiting fellow from late 2001 until 2003, working at the neutron spectroscopy facility at the AECL Chalk River Laboratories in Ontario, Canada. He then moved to the Department of Materials, Imperial College London as lecturer, and became a professor in 2015.

David Dye teaches metallurgy, and his research focuses primarily on the micromechanics, design, and fatigue processes of titanium and nickel/cobalt superalloys, with side interests in zirconium, twinning-induced plasticity steels, and superelastic NiTi-based alloys. Most of his work is done in collaboration with Rolls-Royce and other industries, including nuclear and aerospace.

Dye is an experimentalist. His work involves using Electron backscatter diffraction and traditional lab-based characterisation methods, transmission electron microscopy (TEM), neutron and X-rays synchrotron at facilities like ISIS Neutron and Muon Source, Diamond Light Source, European Synchrotron Radiation Facility, and in situ microbeam Laue synchrotron diffraction.

=== Public engagement ===
Dye runs a YouTube channel, personal blog, and has courses on Coursera to teach metallurgy, mathematics and data analysis, continuum mechanics, and engineering Alloys. Dye also is a scientific witness to the Science and Technology Committee of the UK parliament.

== Awards and honours ==
- 2002 and 2005 Grossman Award, ASM International
- 2005 Grunfeld Medal, Institute of Materials, Minerals and Mining (IOM3)
- 2010 Harvey Flower Titanium prize, Institute of Materials, Minerals and Mining
- 2014 Defence Aerospace award, Rolls-Royce
- 2017 Cook/Ablett Medal, Institute of Materials, Minerals and Mining
- 2018 EPD Division Science awards, The Minerals, Metals & Materials Society (TMS)
- 2022 Silver Medal, Acta Materialia

== Selected publications ==
- R.J. Talling, R.J. Dashwood, M. Jackson, D. Dye, On the mechanism of superelasticity in Gum metal, Acta Materialia, Volume 57, Issue 4, 2009, Pages 1188–1198, ISSN 1359-6454, doi:10.1016/j.actamat.2008.11.013..
- N.G. Jones, R.J. Dashwood, M. Jackson, D. Dye, β Phase decomposition in Ti–5Al–5Mo–5V–3Cr, Acta Materialia, Volume 57, Issue 13, 2009, Pages 3830–3839, ISSN 1359-6454, doi:10.1016/j.actamat.2009.04.031.
- N.G. Jones, R.J. Dashwood, D. Dye, M. Jackson, Thermomechanical processing of Ti–5Al–5Mo–5V–3Cr, Materials Science and Engineering: A, Volume 490, Issues 1–2, 2008, Pages 369–377, ISSN 0921-5093, doi:10.1016/j.msea.2008.01.055.
- K.M. Rahman, V.A. Vorontsov, D. Dye, The effect of grain size on the twin initiation stress in a TWIP steel, Acta Materialia, Volume 89, 2015, Pages 247–257, ISSN 1359-6454, doi:10.1016/j.actamat.2015.02.008.
