= Downtown Moncton =

- Downtown
- Interactive map of Downtown Moncton
- Coordinates: 46.090436°N 64.783888°W
- Country: Canada
- Province: New Brunswick
- City: Moncton
- Named for: Central Business District
- Communities: List of Communities

Area
  - Total: 6.1 km^{2} (2.4 sq mi)

Population
  - Total: 7,837
  - Density: 1,300/km^{2} (3,300/sq mi)
- Area code: 506
- Website: http://downtownmoncton.com/about-us/downtown-moncton-glance/

Downtown Moncton is a central neighbourhood in the city of Moncton, New Brunswick.

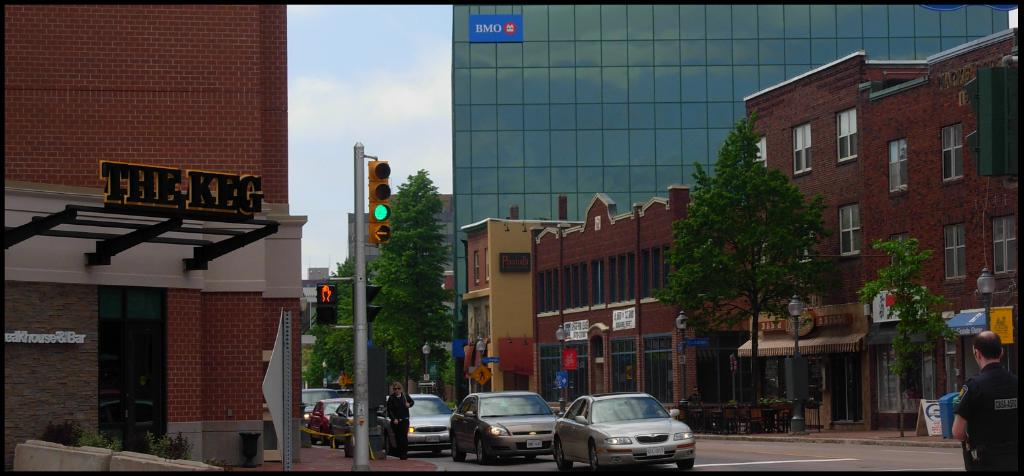
View of Downtown Moncton

== History ==
See History of Moncton and Timeline of Moncton history

== Places of note ==
Current name	Category
14 Church Street	Commercial
777 Main Street	Commercial
Aberdeen Cultural Centre	Culture
Acadian Bus Station	Transportation
Albion Block	Commercial
Andal Place	Commercial
Assomption Blvd Industrial Park	Industrial
Assumption Place	Commercial
Atlantic Lotto Building	Commercial
Bell Aliant Tower	Commercial
Blue Cross Centre	Commercial
Moncton Bore Park	Park
Moncton Caledonia Building	Commercial
Capitol Theatre (Moncton)	Culture
Cathédrale Notre-Dame de l'Assomption (Moncton)	Religious
Central United Church	Religion
Commerce House	Structure
Crowne Plaza Block	Lodging
Empire Block	Commercial
Foundry Street Building	Commercial
Dominion Public Building	Government
Moncton Free Meeting House	Culture
Flat Iron Building	Commercial
First Moncton United Baptist Church	Religion
Former Moncton and Regional Public Library	Government
Government of Canada Building, Moncton	Government
Highfield Square	Shopping
Hotel Beausejour	Lodging
Humphrey Block	Commercial
Higgins Block	Commercial
King Street Convent	Religious
MAGMA-AMGM	Religion
Marriott Residence Inn Hotel	Lodging
Masonic Temple	Religion
McSweeney Building	Commercial
Minto Hotel	Commercial
Moncton Train Station	Transportation
Moncton City Hall	Government
Moncton Courthouse	Government
Moncton Museum	Culture
Moncton Place	Commercial
National Banque Nationale	Commercial
Old Moncton Hospital	Government
(Former) Oulton College Building	Education
Paramount Complex	Commercial
Provincial Bank Building	Commercial
RD MacLean Co Ltd	Commercial
Rand's House	Residential
Riverfront Park	Park
Robinson Court	Shopping
Rogers Buildings	Commercial
Royal Bank Building	Commercial
Salvation Army Citadel	Religion
St Bernard Church	Religion
St George's Anglican Church	Religion
Subway Block	Commercial
Terminal Centre	Commercial
Théâtre l'Escaouette	Culture
Times Building	Commercial
Times & Transcript	Commercial
Transcript Building	Structure
Vaughan Harvey Shopping Area	Shopping
Victoria Park	Park
Victoria Block	Commercial
Cora's	

== See also ==
- List of neighbourhoods in Moncton
- List of neighbourhoods in New Brunswick
