= List of historic places in Moncton =

Historic buildings in New Brunswick, Canada

This article is a list of historic places in Moncton, New Brunswick entered on the Canadian Register of Historic Places, whether they are federal, provincial, or municipal.

== List of historic places ==
Name	Address	Coordinates	Government recognition (CRHP №)	Wikidata ID	Image
1916 City Hall Façade	20 Mountain Road; Moncton NB	46°05′38″N 64°46′28″W	Moncton municipality (6573)	Q3329733	More images
Aberdeen Cultural Centre	140 Botsford Street; Moncton NB	46°05′34″N 64°46′40″W	Moncton municipality (1992)	Q4666914	More images
Albion Block	844-852 Main Street; Moncton NB	46°05′17″N 64°46′44″W	Moncton municipality (4066)	Q138358827	More images
Aliant Tower	Corner of Botsford St. and Queen St. Moncton NB	46°05′23″N 64°46′35″W	Moncton municipality (5386)	Q4883108	More images
114 Alma St.	114 Alma St. Moncton NB	46°05′31″N 64°46′42″W	Moncton municipality (5965)	Q139600541	Upload Photo
10 Austin Street	10 Austin Street; Moncton NB	46°05′33″N 64°46′48″W	Moncton municipality (5318)	Q139600659	Upload Photo
Bank of Montreal Building	567-569 Main Street; Moncton NB	46°05′23″N 64°46′24″W	Moncton municipality (2993)	Q139600706	Upload Photo
The Bend	Petitcodiac River near Hall's Creek; Moncton NB	46°05′33″N 64°45′45″W	Moncton municipality (5556)	Q2998706	More images
Bonaccord House	250 Bonaccord Street; Moncton NB	46°05′40″N 64°47′08″W	Moncton municipality (5592)	Q139600789	Upload Photo
Bore Park	Main Street near King Street; Moncton NB	46°05′25″N 64°46′16″W	Moncton municipality (3526)	Q109829710	More images
72 Botsford Street	72 Botsford Street; Moncton NB	46°05′27″N 64°46′36″W	Moncton municipality (12924)	Q139600797	Upload Photo
86 Botsford Street	86 Botsford St. Moncton NB	46°05′28″N 64°46′47″W	Moncton municipality (4947)	Q139600812	Upload Photo
169 Botsford Street	169 Botsford Street; Moncton NB	46°05′37″N 64°46′40″W	Moncton municipality (6577)	Q139600835	Upload Photo
264 Botsford Street	264 Botsford Street; Moncton NB	46°05′47″N 64°46′39″W	Moncton municipality (6002)	Q139600852	Upload Photo
224 Cameron Street	224 Cameron Street; Moncton NB	46°05′32″N 64°47′25″W	Moncton municipality (5607)	Q139600986	Upload Photo
Canadiana Inn	46 Archibald Street; Moncton NB	46°05′20″N 64°46′56″W	Moncton municipality (5624)	Q139601010	Upload Photo
Capitol Theatre	811 Main Street; Moncton NB	46°05′18″N 64°46′44″W	New Brunswick (5736), Moncton municipality (3055)	Q545543	More images
Cathédrale Notre-Dame de l'Assomption	226 St. George St. Moncton NB	46°05′28″N 64°46′56″W	Moncton municipality (5578)		
Central United Church	150 Queen Street; Moncton NB	46°05′23″N 64°46′44″W	Moncton municipality (4948)		Upload Photo
Central United Church Manse	154 Queen Street; Moncton NB	46°05′21″N 64°46′44″W	Moncton municipality (5411)		Upload Photo
14 Church Street	14 Church Street; Moncton NB	46°05′19″N 64°46′41″W	Moncton municipality (5629)	Q139601039	More images
88 Church Street	88 Church Street; Moncton NB	46°05′28″N 64°46′45″W	Moncton municipality (12931)	Q139601047	Upload Photo
89 Church Street	89 Church Street; Moncton NB	46°05′28″N 64°46′44″W	Moncton municipality (9667)	Q139601073	Upload Photo
134 Church Street	134 Church Street; Moncton NB	46°05′33″N 64°46′47″W	Moncton municipality (5523)	Q139601088	Upload Photo
140 Church Street	140 Church St. Moncton NB	46°05′34″N 64°46′48″W	Moncton municipality (9642)	Q139601096	Upload Photo
Xenophon Cleveland House	189 Highfield Street; Moncton NB	46°05′33″N 64°47′11″W	Moncton municipality (6015)	Q139601130	Upload Photo
Dowd Residence	385 Robinson Street; Moncton NB	46°05′40″N 64°46′55″W	Moncton municipality (5459)	Q139601141	Upload Photo
Doyle Building	400 St. George Street; Moncton NB	46°05′22″N 64°47′24″W	Moncton municipality (5458)	Q138358849	More images
Elmwood Cemetery	200 Elmwood Drive; Moncton NB	46°06′30″N 64°46′33″W	Moncton municipality (4044)	Q139601157	Upload Photo
Empire Block	801-805 Main Street; Moncton NB	46°05′17″N 64°46′43″W	Moncton municipality (3059)	Q139601171	Upload Photo
Federal Building, Dominion Public Building	1081 Main Street; Moncton NB	46°05′51″N 64°47′06″W	Federal (3899)	Q55206256	More images
First Moncton United Baptist Church	50 Church Street; Moncton NB	46°05′24″N 64°46′43″W	Moncton municipality (5494)	Q138358871	More images
Flat Iron Building	897-899 Main Street; Moncton NB	46°05′16″N 64°46′52″W	Moncton municipality (2970)	Q138358906	More images
47 Fleet Street	47 Fleet St. Moncton NB	46°05′24″N 64°47′05″W	Moncton municipality (4877)	Q139601809	Upload Photo
Former Moncton and Regional Public Library	51 Highfield Street; Moncton NB	46°05′18″N 64°47′04″W	Moncton municipality (12922)	Q139601893	More images
Gorge Cemetery	Gorge Road; Moncton NB	46°09′06″N 64°52′11″W	Moncton municipality (18165)	Q139601921	Upload Photo
Gulf Fisheries Centre	343 Archibald Street; Moncton NB	46°05′53″N 64°47′07″W	Federal (10983)	Q14538814	Upload Photo
Higgins Block	679-687 Main Street; Moncton NB	46°05′20″N 64°46′33″W	Moncton municipality (4245)	Q139601945	Upload Photo
Highfield Street Pumping Station	5 Thanet Street; Moncton NB	46°06′04″N 64°47′24″W	Moncton municipality (4015)	Q139601958	Upload Photo
Highfield Street United Baptist Church	290 St. George Street; Moncton NB	46°05′25″N 64°47′07″W	Moncton municipality (5554)	Q138359034	More images
69 Highfield Street	69 Highfield Street; Moncton NB	46°05′19″N 64°47′05″W	Moncton municipality (5651)	Q138359054	More images
73 Highfield Street	73 Highfield Street; Moncton NB	46°05′20″N 64°47′06″W	Moncton municipality (6061)	Q138359075	More images
27 Hillcrest Drive	27 Hillcrest Dr. Moncton NB	46°05′01″N 64°47′45″W	Moncton municipality (5493)	Q139601989	Upload Photo
John A. Humphrey Residence	132 Mill Road; Moncton NB	46°06′34″N 64°46′03″W	Moncton municipality (4003)	Q139602003	Upload Photo
I.C.R. Monument	Millennium Boulevard; Moncton NB	46°05′26″N 64°48′09″W	Moncton municipality (6565)	Q139602014	Upload Photo
Irish Families Memorial	Riverfront Park; Moncton NB	46°05′13″N 64°46′26″W	Moncton municipality (6045)	Q139602049	More images
149 John Street	149 John Street; Moncton NB	46°05′36″N 64°47′32″W	Moncton municipality (6131)	Q139602092	Upload Photo
C. L. Jones Residence	3 Cross Street; Moncton NB	46°06′16″N 64°46′28″W	Moncton municipality (3967)	Q139602118	Upload Photo
Killam House	84 Highfield Street; Moncton NB	46°05′20″N 64°47′07″W	Moncton municipality (5984)	Q138359263	More images
Léopold-Taillon Building	165 Massey Avenue; Moncton NB	46°06′16″N 64°46′52″W	Moncton municipality (6575)	Q139602169	Upload Photo
Marjillee Lutes Residence	860 Front Mountain Rd. Moncton NB	46°08′26″N 64°53′25″W	Moncton municipality (5319)	Q139602184	Upload Photo
Lutz Mountain Meeting House	3143 Mountain Road; Moncton NB	46°08′11″N 64°54′06″W	Moncton municipality (4002)	Q139602201	Upload Photo
Magnetic Hill	Magnetic Hill Road; Moncton NB	46°08′09″N 64°53′22″W	Moncton municipality (4004)	Q7749561	More images
884-886 1/2 Main Street	884-886 1/2 Main St. Moncton NB	46°05′16″N 64°46′47″W	Moncton municipality (5999)	Q139602272	Upload Photo
J. A. Marven Residence	20 Austin Street; Moncton NB	46°05′33″N 64°46′49″W	Moncton municipality (5547)	Q139602323	Upload Photo
Mary's Home	207 Mountain Road; Moncton NB	46°05′45″N 64°47′11″W	Moncton municipality (2733)	Q139602356	More images
Masonic Temple	115 Queen Street; Moncton NB	46°05′24″N 64°46′39″W	Moncton municipality (4013)	Q138359557	More images
McSweeney Building	700 Main Street; Moncton NB	46°05′19″N 64°46′33″W	Moncton municipality (2784)	Q138359586	More images
Minto Hotel Sample Rooms	196 Robinson St. Moncton NB	46°05′16″N 64°46′47″W	Moncton municipality (3969)	Q139602442	Upload Photo
Moncton Free Meeting House	140-152 Steadman Street / 20 Mountain Road; Moncton NB	46°05′38″N 64°46′26″W	Federal (12029), Moncton municipality (1940)	Q3517678	More images
118 Mountain Road	118 Mountain Rd. Moncton NB	46°05′40″N 64°46′47″W	Moncton municipality (5996)	Q139602468	Upload Photo
Dr. Ambrose R. Myers Residence and Office	15 Alma Street; Moncton NB	46°05′21″N 64°46′36″W	Moncton municipality (5238)	Q139602485	Upload Photo
No. 2 Fire Station	199 St. George Street; Moncton NB	46°05′29″N 64°46′53″W	Moncton municipality (5339)	Q139602498	More images
Old Moncton Hospital	107-125 King Street; Moncton NB	46°05′36″N 64°46′17″W	Moncton municipality (3968)	Q139602566	Upload Photo
Peters House	35 Highfield Street; Moncton NB	46°05′15″N 64°47′03″W	Moncton municipality (2686)	Q138359602	More images
Prince Edward School	100 West Street; Moncton NB	46°05′12″N 64°47′39″W	Moncton municipality (5648)	Q139602600	Upload Photo
Provincial Bank Building	696-698 Main Street; Moncton NB	46°05′19″N 64°46′32″W	Moncton municipality (3892)	Q139602646	Upload Photo
201 Queen Street	201 Queen Street; Moncton NB	46°05′20″N 64°46′54″W	Moncton municipality (9643)	Q139602671	Upload Photo
Rand House	62 Botsford Street; Moncton NB	46°05′26″N 64°46′36″W	Moncton municipality (4045)	Q139602687	Upload Photo
70 Reade Street	70 Reade Street; Moncton NB	46°06′02″N 64°48′01″W	Moncton municipality (6016)	Q139602725	Upload Photo
Record House	93 Victoria St. Moncton NB	46°05′28″N 64°46′37″W	Moncton municipality (5527)	Q139602743	Upload Photo
Robinson House	83 Victoria Street; Moncton NB	46°05′28″N 64°46′40″W	Moncton municipality (4018)	Q139602753	Upload Photo
L. A. Roy Groceries	347 Mountain Road; Moncton NB	46°05′47″N 64°47′31″W	Moncton municipality (5598)	Q139602760	Upload Photo
Royal Bank Building	713-721 Main Street; Moncton NB	46°05′19″N 64°46′36″W	Moncton municipality (2943)	Q139602775	More images
Rubin's Ltd. Mural	720-730 Main St. Moncton NB	46°05′19″N 64°46′34″W	Moncton municipality (5579)	Q107125559	More images
St. Bernard's Church and Rectory	43 Botsford Street; Moncton NB	46°05′26″N 64°46′34″W	Moncton municipality (3428)		
St. George's Anglican Church	51 Church Street; Moncton NB	46°05′23″N 64°46′42″W	Moncton municipality (5257)	Q30597815	More images
75 St. George Street	75 St. George Street; Moncton NB	46°05′34″N 64°46′32″W	Moncton municipality (6083)	Q139602788	Upload Photo
St. John's United Church	75 Alma Street; Moncton NB	46°05′27″N 64°46′39″W	Moncton municipality (5615)	Q139602799	Upload Photo
Salvation Army Citadel	16 Church Street; Moncton NB	46°05′20″N 64°46′42″W	Moncton municipality (5606)	Q139602811	More images
Settlers' Landing Monument	Main Street; Moncton NB	46°05′33″N 64°45′53″W	Moncton municipality (6003)	Q139602837	More images
91 Steadman Street	91 Steadman St. Moncton NB	46°05′34″N 64°46′23″W	Moncton municipality (6576)	Q139602850	Upload Photo
Subway Block	885-889 Main Street; Moncton NB	46°05′16″N 64°46′49″W	Moncton municipality (3000)	Q139602857	Upload Photo
Sunny Brae Rink	Donald Avenue; Moncton NB	46°06′04″N 64°46′35″W	Moncton municipality (5625)	Q100914624	More images
Tankville School	1665 Elmwood Drive; Moncton NB	46°09′28″N 64°46′46″W	Moncton municipality (4007)	Q139602869	Upload Photo
C. D. Thomson Residence	184 Alma Street; Moncton NB	46°05′37″N 64°46′41″W	Moncton municipality (6572)	Q139602887	Upload Photo
Tiferes Israel Synagogue	56 Steadman Street; Moncton NB	46°05′29″N 64°46′22″W	Moncton municipality (5478)	Q117825858	More images
Times Building	18 Botsford Street; Moncton NB	46°05′21″N 64°46′34″W	Moncton municipality (3970)	Q139602904	Upload Photo
William S. Torrie House	48 Bonaccord Street; Moncton NB	46°05′18″N 64°46′59″W	Moncton municipality (1978)	Q139602921	Upload Photo
Transcript Building	828 Main Street; Moncton NB	46°05′17″N 64°46′43″W	Moncton municipality (4907)	Q138359645	More images
Treitz Haus	10 Bendview Court; Moncton NB	46°05′21″N 64°46′16″W	Moncton municipality (4868)	Q138359842	More images
Victoria Block	817-831 Main Street; Moncton NB	46°05′17″N 64°46′45″W	Moncton municipality (3132)	Q139602955	Upload Photo
Victoria Park, New Brunswick	Weldon Street; Moncton NB	46°05′33″N 64°47′23″W	Moncton municipality (4023)	Q7926921	More images
86 Weldon Street	86 Weldon Street; Moncton NB	46°05′18″N 64°47′15″W	Moncton municipality (12933)	Q139602959	Upload Photo
White Fathers African Mission	213 Bonaccord Street; Moncton NB	46°05′38″N 64°47′07″W	Moncton municipality (6074)	Q139602969	Upload Photo
5-11 Williams Street	5-11 Williams Street; Moncton NB	46°05′39″N 64°47′06″W	Moncton municipality (5995)	Q139602977	Upload Photo
Thomas Williams House	103 Park Street; Moncton NB	46°05′31″N 64°47′09″W	Moncton municipality (1969)	Q138360200	More images
R. N. Wyse Building	837-839 Main Street; Moncton NB	46°05′18″N 64°46′47″W	Moncton municipality (6560)	Q139602983	More images
R. N. Wyse Residence	204-206 Cameron Street; Moncton NB	46°05′29″N 64°47′24″W	Moncton municipality (4001)	Q139602990	Upload Photo

== See also ==
- List of historic places in Westmorland County, New Brunswick
- List of historic places in New Brunswick
- List of National Historic Sites of Canada in New Brunswick
