= List of buildings and structures in Metro Moncton =

Greater Moncton is the area encompassing Moncton, Dieppe, and Riverview in New Brunswick, Canada.

Name	Category	City	Neighbourhood	Built	Owner/Est Pop	Notes
The Magnetic Hill	Visitor Attraction	Moncton	Magnetic Hill			
Magnetic Hill Golf and Country Club	Sport	Moncton	Magnetic Hill			
Narrow-gauge railway	Visitor Attraction	Moncton	Magnetic Hill			
Wharf Village Shoppes & Restaurants	Visitor Attraction	Moncton	Magnetic Hill			
Magic Mountain	Visitor Attraction	Moncton	Magnetic Hill			
Magic Mountain Mini Putt	Visitor Attraction	Moncton	Magnetic Hill			
Magic Mountain Arcade	Visitor Attraction	Moncton	Magnetic Hill			
Casino NB	Visitor Attraction	Moncton	Magnetic Hill			
Magnetic Hill Zoo	Visitor Attraction	Moncton	Magnetic Hill			
Magnetic Hill Concert Site	Music Venue	Moncton	Magnetic Hill			
The Boardwalk Complex	Visitor Attraction	Moncton	Magnetic Hill			
Boardwalk Driving Range	Visitor Attraction	Moncton	Magnetic Hill			
Magnetic Hill Shopping Area	Shopping	Moncton	Magnetic Hill			(Area From Bulman Dr North-East to Moncton City Limits)
Magnetic Hill Estates	Residential	Moncton	Magnetic Hill			
Lutes Mountain Heritage Museum	Culture	Moncton	Magnetic Hill			
Christ Church	Religious	Moncton	Magnetic Hill			
Glad Tidings Pentecostal	Religious	Moncton	Magnetic Hill			
Christ Church	Religious	Moncton	Magnetic Hill			
Church-Jesus Christ-Latter Day	Religious	Moncton	New North End			
Christian Church of Moncton	Religious	Moncton	Magnetic Hill			
Glad Tidings Pentecostal	Religious	Moncton	Magnetic Hill			
Hillside Baptist Church	Religious	Moncton	New North End			
Mount Zion Presbyterian Church	Religious	Moncton	North-West End			
Moncton High School (1898)	Education	Moncton	Central Moncton			

== See also ==
- List of tallest buildings in Moncton
