= List of companies headquartered in Moncton =

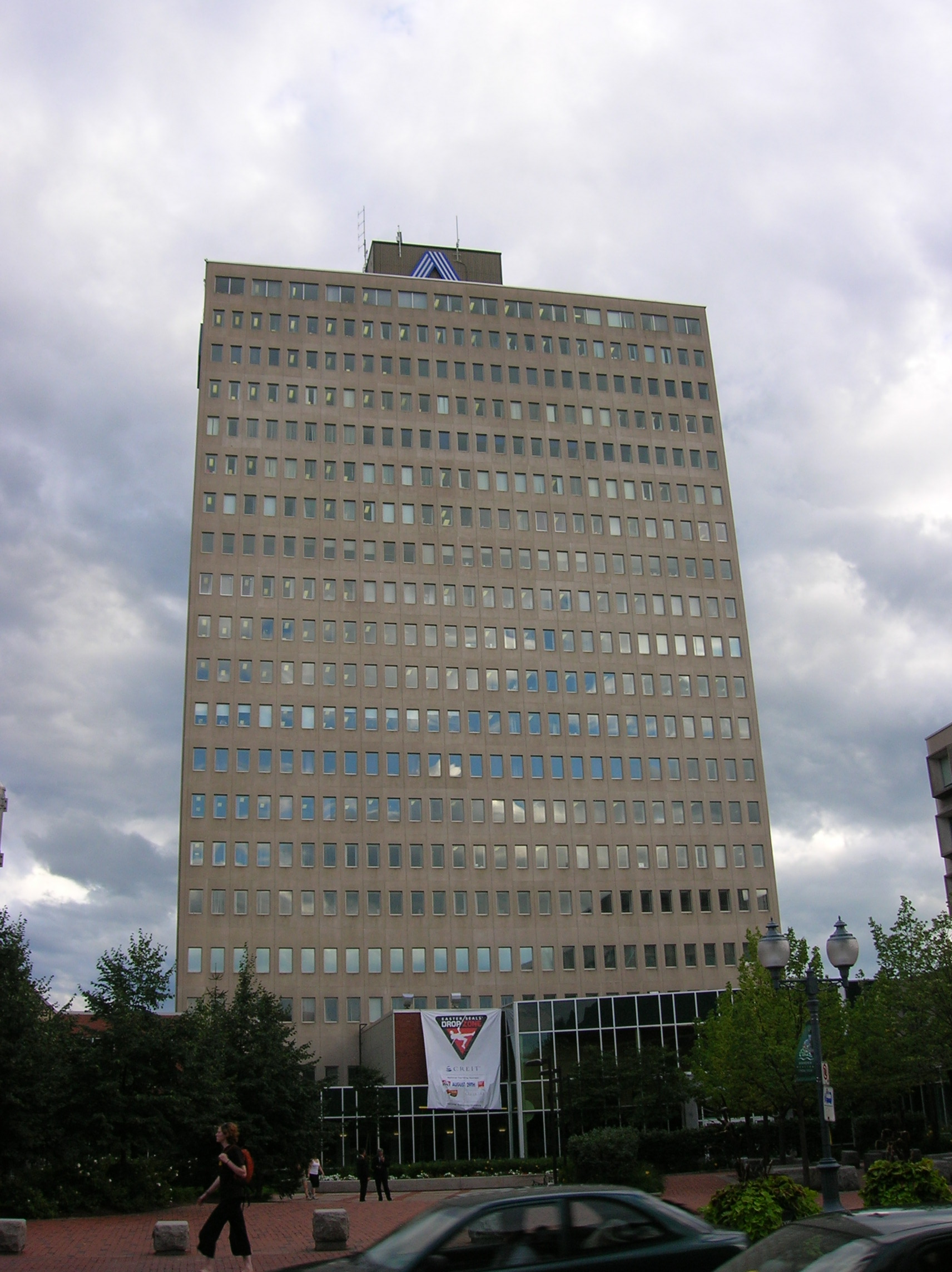
Assumption Place, headquarters of Assumption Life

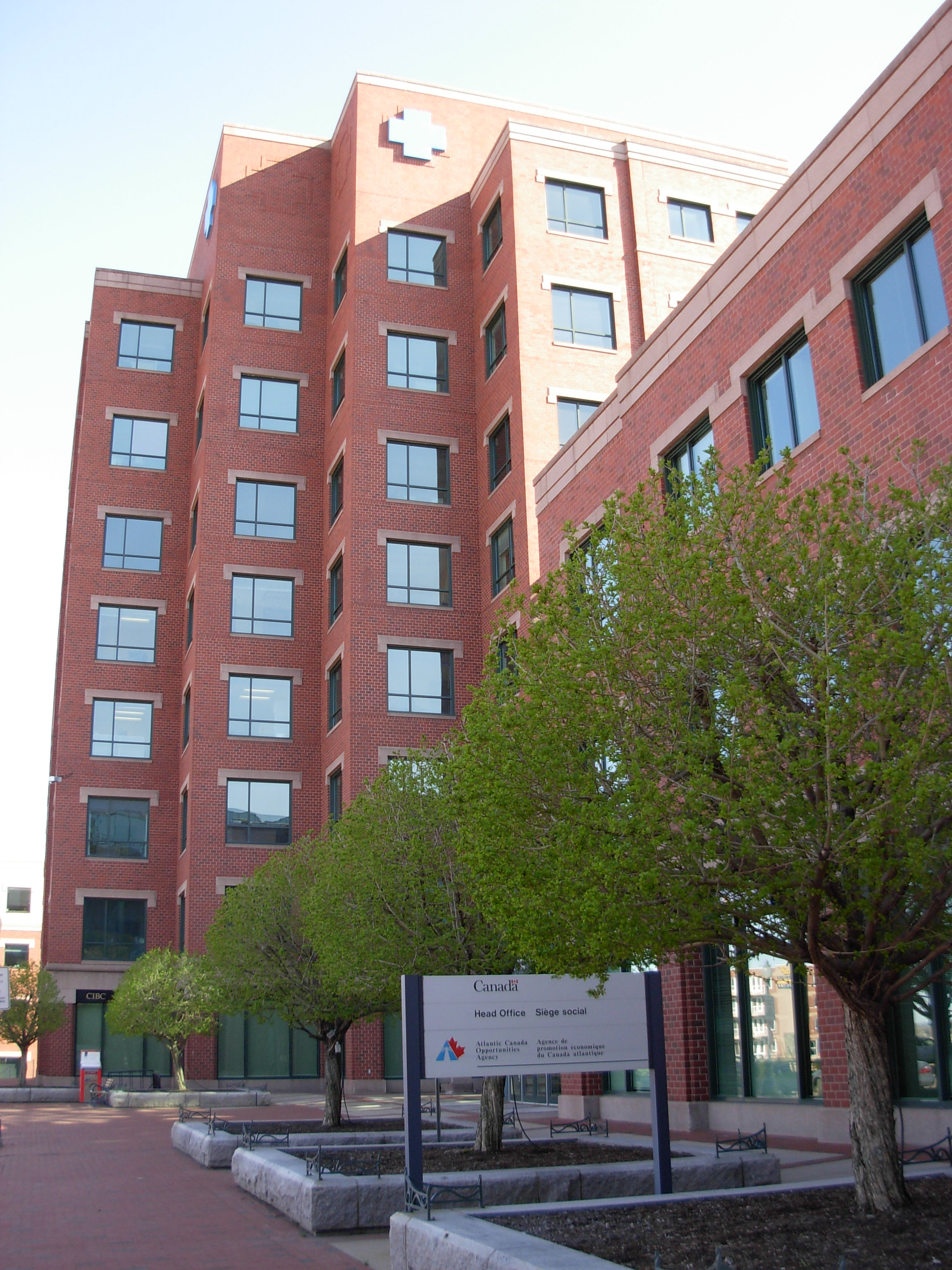
The Blue Cross Centre, headquarters of Medavie Blue Cross

== Companies (2014 onwards) ==
This is a partial list of companies that are headquartered in the Greater Moncton Area, including Dieppe and Riverview, New Brunswick, Canada:

Name	Industry	Reach	Founded	Employees
Armour Transportation Systems	Road transport	Eastern Canada, N.E. U.S.	1930	--
Assumption Life	Financial services	Canada	1903	339
Atlantic Lottery Corporation	Lottery	Atlantic Canada	1976	600
Gogii Games	Video games	Canada	2006	--
IGT Canada	Slot machines	Canada	--	--
Major Drilling Group International	Drilling	International	1980	4,526
Medavie Blue Cross	Life insurance	Atlantic Canada	1943	1,450
Pizza Delight Corporation	Restaurant chain	Canada	1968	3,500+
PropertyGuys.com	Real estate	Canada	1998	--

=== Arms of J.D. Irving Limited based in Moncton ===
Name	Industry
Irving Tissue (Majesta, Royale)	Paper products
Brunswick News	News media

== Former companies ==
This is a list of notable head offices formerly located in Moncton:

- Canadian National Railway (Atlantic Region)
- CN Marine
- Eaton's catalogue (Atlantic Region)
- Intercolonial Railway of Canada

== See also ==
- Chamber of commerce
- Acadian French
