= Magnetic Hill, New Brunswick =

Hill in Canada

Coordinates: 46.133605°N 64.882035°W

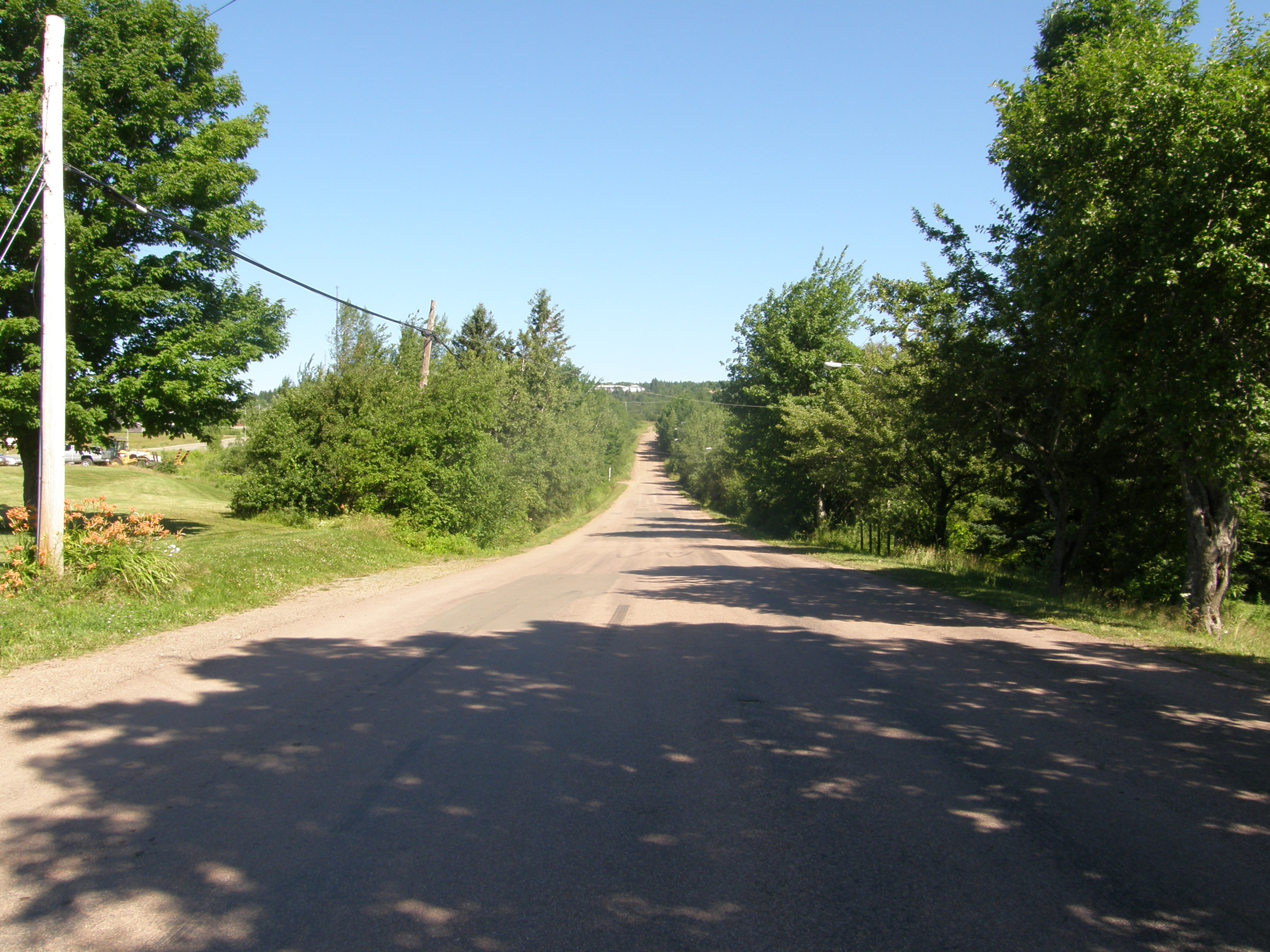
View from the front

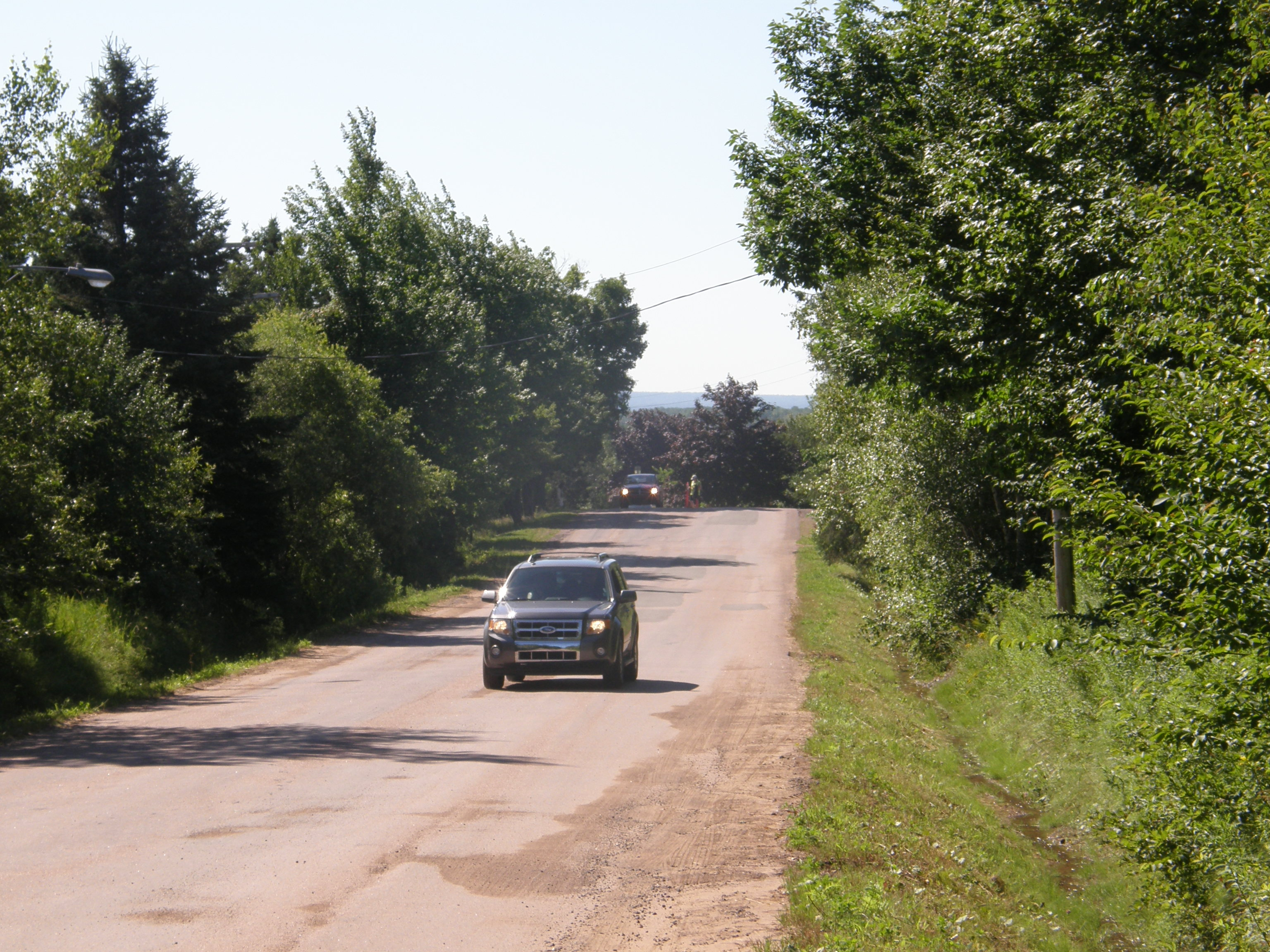
View in reverse

Photos of the Magnetic Hill. From the frontal view perspective, the white post in the middle of the 1st picture appears to be the lowest point in the road. When viewed in reverse from the white post, the lowest point is actually behind the car in the foreground of the 2nd picture.

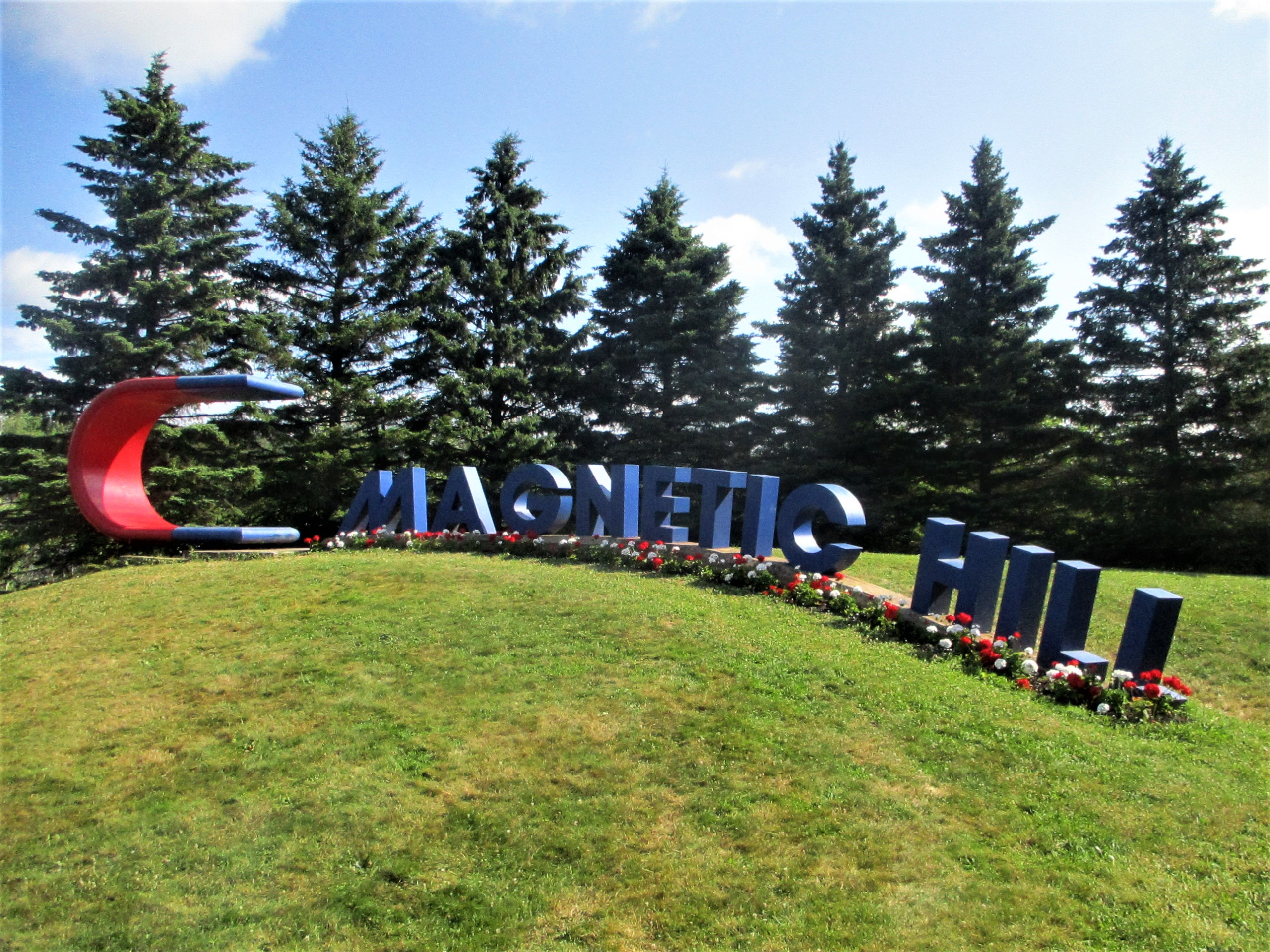
Magnetic Hill-Moncton

Magnetic Hill is a Canadian neighbourhood in the north-west area of Moncton, New Brunswick. Magnetic Hill is located around the intersection of Route 126 and Route 2. Magnetic Hill is partially within the community of Lutes Mountain.

== History ==
The name Magnetic Hill was taken from the area surrounding the Magnetic Hill Phenomenon.

== Places of note ==
Name	Category	Notes
The Magnetic Hill	Visitor attraction	
Magnetic Hill Golf and Country Club	Sport	
Wharf Village Shoppes & Restaurants	Visitor attraction	
Magic Mountain	Visitor attraction	
Magic Mountain Mini Putt	Visitor attraction	
Magic Mountain Arcade	Visitor attraction	
Casino NB	Visitor attraction	
Magnetic Hill Zoo	Visitor attraction	
Magnetic Hill Concert Site	Music venue	
The Boardwalk Complex	Visitor attraction	
Magnetic Hill Shopping Area	Shopping	Area from Bulman Drive northeast to the Moncton city limits
Magnetic Hill Estates	Residential	
Lutes Mountain Heritage Museum	Culture	
Glad Tidings Pentecostal	Religious	
Christ Church	Religious	
Christian Church of Moncton	Religious	
Glad Tidings Pentecostal	Religious	
Mount Zion Presbyterian Church	Religious	

== See also ==
- List of neighbourhoods in Moncton
- List of tallest buildings in Moncton
