= Assumption Life =

Assumption Mutual Life Insurance Company
- Trade name: Assumption Life
- Native name: Assomption Compagnie Mutuelle d’Assurance-Vie
- Company type: Mutual company
- Industry: Insurance
- Founded: 1903; 123 years ago in Waltham, Massachusetts
- Headquarters: Moncton, New Brunswick
- Key people: Sebastien Dupuis (President and CEO)
- Revenue: ▲CA $105.7 million (2007)
- Operating income: ▲CA $7.2 million (2007)
- Net income: ▲CA $4.1 Million (2007)
- Number of employees: 339
- Website: assomption.ca

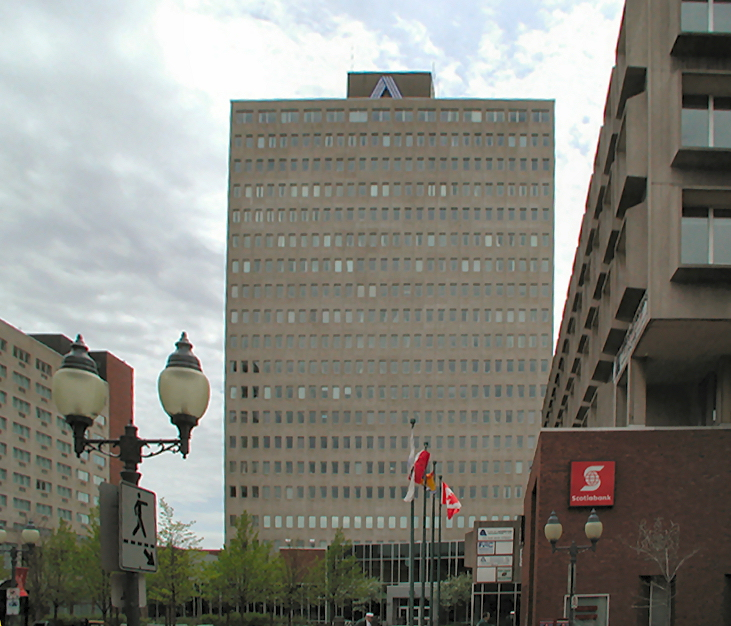
Assumption Place, a 20 storey office building in Downtown Moncton is the headquarters of Assumption Life

Assumption Mutual Life Insurance Company, operating as Assumption Life (French: Assomption Vie), is a Canadian life insurance and asset management company based in Moncton, New Brunswick.

== History ==
The company was established in 1903 by Acadians in Massachusetts as la Société l'Assomption, a small life insurance agency. The company moved to Moncton in 1913 and up until 1969 the company was run as a fraternal society before becoming a mutual organization. In 1972, Assumption Life moved into their new head office in Moncton, Assumption Place, which is by far the tallest building in the city.

== See also ==
- Michel Bastarache
- List of companies headquartered in Moncton
