= Armour Transportation Systems =

Coordinates: 46°05′30″N 64°50′37″W

- Company type: Transportation and Warehousing
- Founded: 1955
- Headquarters: Moncton, New Brunswick, Canada
- Number of employees: 1,900
- Website: www.armour.ca

Armour Transportation Systems is a transportation and warehousing company based in Moncton, New Brunswick, Canada. Founded in 1955 in a small village outside Moncton, Armour has grown to become one of the leading transport companies in Canada. The company has several divisions, Armour Transport is the brand used for transporting goods within Eastern Canada, whereas the companies long haul operations are done under the Pole Star, Triple B, and Hillman's brands. Armour has received many awards over the years including the Canada's 50 Best Managed Companies Award in 2006 and receiving platinum status from "Canada's 50 Best Managed Companies" in 2011. Armour was also selected as one of ten companies to be showcased in "Building the Best: Lessons from Inside Canada's Best Managed Companies" book. Furthermore, the organization has been consistently placed in the Top 12 Carriers in Canada according to Today's Trucking.

== History ==
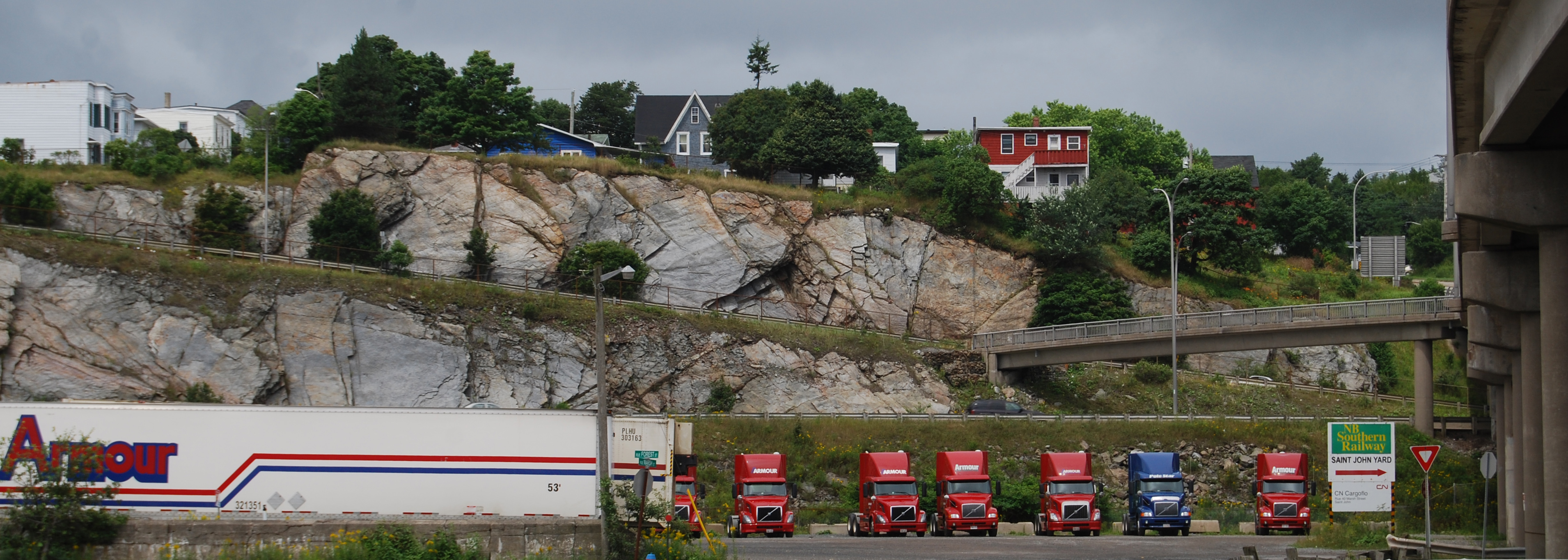
Trucks Parked in Saint John, NB.

G. Armour & Son was founded in 1955 by Gordon Armour in the small community of Taylor Village, New Brunswick. At that time, they had a fleet to vehicles. Wesley Armour then purchased the organization from his father in 1968. In a strategic decision, Wesley moved the office to Moncton where the company slowly began to expand once again. The 1970s followed as a decade of change, where the organization readily developed by purchasing more vehicles, hiring new employees, and opening more terminal branches. The name was changed to Armour Transportation Systems and by the 1980s the organization gained a long-haul division. During the 1990s, Armour Transportation expanded once more. They entered into logistics warehousing and added a courier division throughout the Atlantic Provinces. By 2003, Armour had added port to door container shipping to their long list of services. Today, the firm currently rests as one of the top transportation and logistics specialists in the country, with over 4,000 pieces of equipment, 26 terminal networks, and 1,900 employees throughout Canada and the United States.

== Divisions ==
Armour is made up of several divisions

- Armour Transport is the company's main brand which is responsible for transportation within Eastern Canada. Recently, Armour has also expanded its name to include port to door transportation with container shipping options. Other companies associated with Armour Transportation are Diamond's Transfer, Drury's Transfer, O'Meara's Transport & Parcel Express, Way's Transport and RJS Terminals. Armour Transportation Systems provides several specialized services including; temperature controlled LTL and truckload (heated and refrigerated), flatbed, stainless tankers, intermodal, logistics, freight brokerage, courier, warehousing, and cross-docking.
- PoleStar, Triple B and Hillman's are the divisions of Armour which handle all long-haul transporting, mainly to Western Canada, the United States and Mexico.
- Armour Courier Service handles small shipments within New Brunswick, Prince Edward Island, Newfoundland and Nova Scotia.
- Armour Logistics Services is the warehousing division of Armour which operates over 700,000 sq/ft of warehousing space.

== See also ==
- List of companies headquartered in Moncton
