= Government of Canada Building =

Government of Canada Building may refer to:

- Government of Canada Building, Scarborough, Ontario
- Government of Canada Building, Moncton, New Brunswick
- Government of Canada Buildings (North York), Ontario
