= Law Courts (disambiguation) =

"Law Courts" most commonly refers to courts of law. The term may also refer to:

- Australian buildings:
  - Law Courts, Brisbane
  - Law Courts, Sydney
- Law Courts of Brussels, Belgium
- Canadian buildings:
  - Law Courts (Edmonton)
  - Moncton Law Courts
  - Law Courts (Vancouver)
- Law Courts, Nicosia, Cyprus
- Dunedin Law Courts, New Zealand

== See also ==
- Maine Supreme Judicial Court, known as the Law Court when sitting as an appellate court
