= Moncton Public Library =

Library in Moncton, Canada

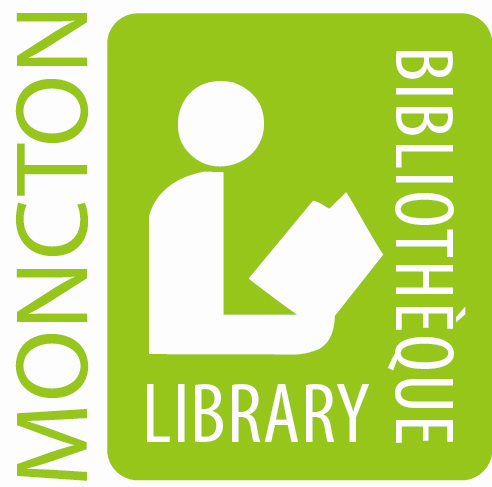
- 46.0886°N 64.7746°W
- Type: Public Library in Moncton, New Brunswick, Canada
- Established: 1913

Collection
- Items collected: Books, newspapers, sound recordings, databases, maps, drawings
- Size: 1.8M items

Other information
- Website: Moncton Public Library

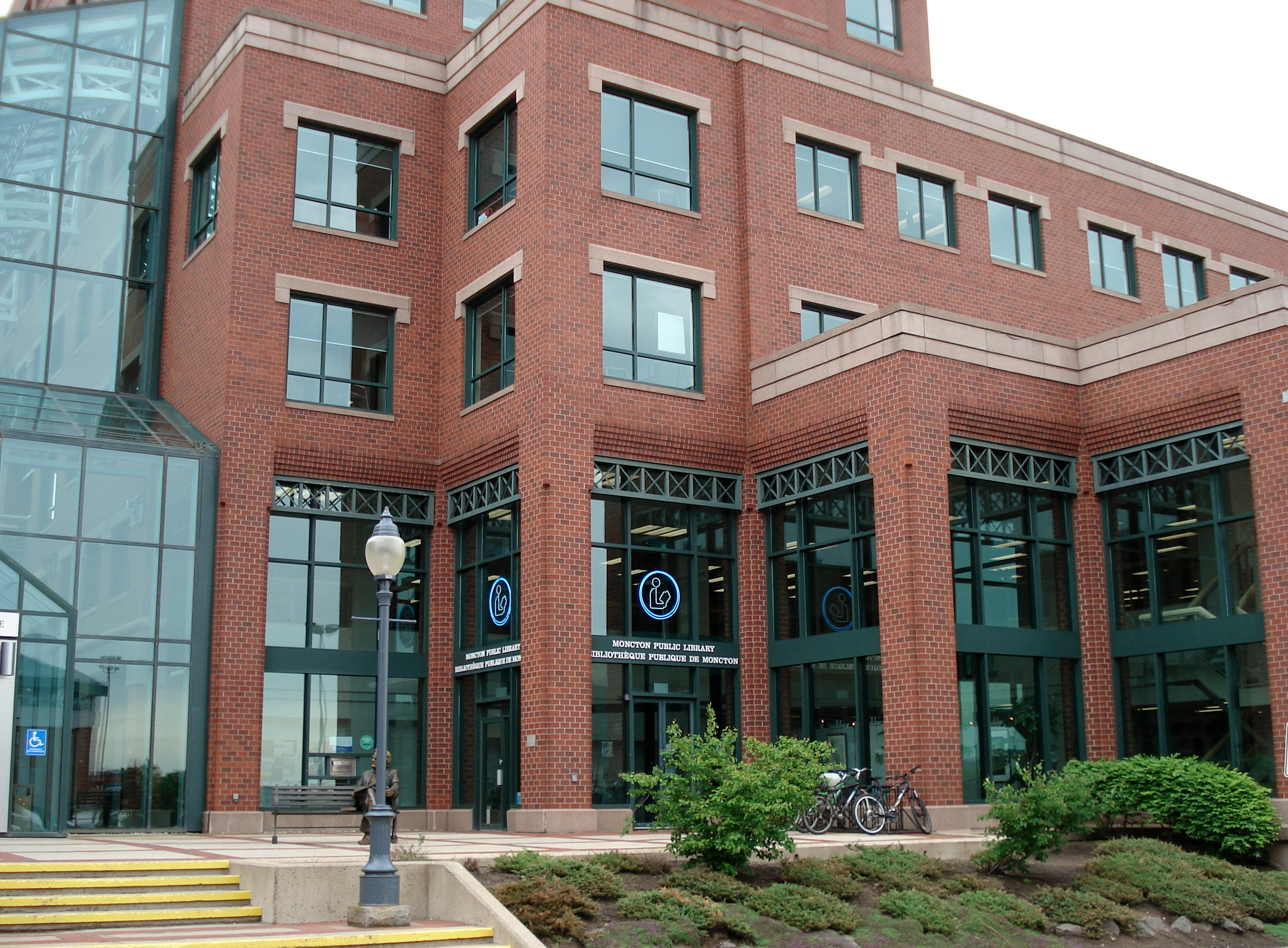
The main entrance of the Moncton Public Library.

The Moncton Public Library in Moncton, New Brunswick, Canada, aims to meet the educational, cultural, informational and recreational needs of its users. The Moncton Public Library provides access to a province-wide collection, with over 135,200 items on its shelves.

== History ==
The Moncton Public Library was founded in 1913. It was made possible thanks to the efforts of the Fort Cumberland Chapter of the IODE which started working on the project as early as 1911. The library was originally opened in the old City Hall and was destroyed by fire on February 25, 1914. Afterwards, it was moved to the Higgins Block, which is on the corner of Main Street and Botsford Street. On February 27, 1927, the library was moved to Archibald House, which burned down on March 2, 1948.

After the fire, the Moncton Public Library was moved to Kirby House, at 51 Highfield Street, where it was officially reopened on January 20, 1949. This building was demolished in October 1961 in order to build a new one for the library on the same land; it was inaugurated on September 22, 1962. The Moncton Public Library is currently in the Blue Cross Centre where it has been since 1989. The library's previous location on Highfield Street was renovated to accommodate office space in 1991.

On July 13, 2012, a statue of former Moncton resident Northrop Frye was unveiled in front of the library. It was created by artists Darren Byers and Fred Harrison.

=== Naming ===
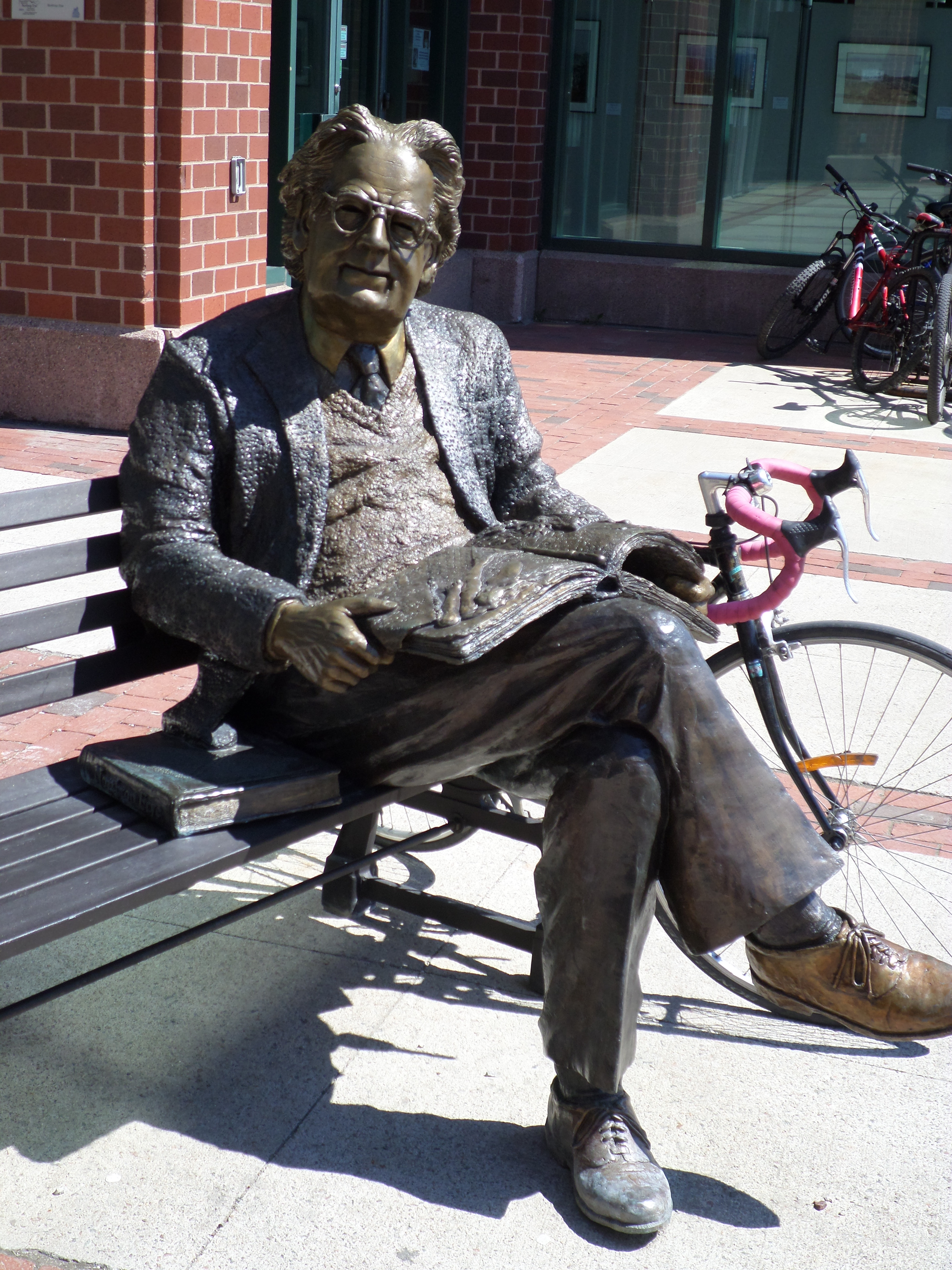
Northrop Frye statue outside the entrance of Moncton Public Library at Blue Cross Centre

In 1998 the City of Moncton's name bank committee suggested that the Moncton Public Library change its name to the Northrop Frye Library to honour the acclaimed literary critic Northrop Frye, who lived in Moncton during his early years. However, the library board of the time disagreed on the grounds that though Frye had a great international reputation and was a renowned and celebrated philosopher and critic, he had "done nothing for the Moncton Public Library itself". The board was also concerned that, if the library were to become the Northrop Frye Library, citizens might get the impression that the public library was instead an archive dedicated to Frye and his works. In order to honour this famous Monctonian, the library instead chose to name a meeting room after him.

== Collections ==
- Book collection includes bestsellers, fiction and non-fiction for all ages, as well as large-print books, audiobooks, CDs, DVDs, magazines, language learning kits, adult literacy materials, talking books for patrons with print disabilities, and braille books for children.
- The collection is more than just books: the library offers board games and a community puzzle swap, as well as an object library, which includes baking pans and cookware, skateboards, sleds, birding kits, bicycle repair kits, ukuleles, and a DeWalt drill kit. All objects can be borrowed with a library card.
- E-books and audiobooks can be borrowed via the New Brunswick Public Libraries Online Library with a New Brunswick library card. Books can be accessed through Libby, OverDrive, and pretnumerique.ca.
- Patrons with print disabilities can use their library card to register for books with CELA.
- Microfilm archive includes newspapers in English and in French from the Greater Moncton area dating back to the late 19th century, census information, and telephone directories.
- Heritage Room archive includes local historical and genealogical books and works by authors from the Albert/Westmorland/Kent area.
- A number of items related to Northrop Frye are on permanent display in the Heritage Room. A clock, a typewriter, and several books that belonged to Northrop Frye's family were donated by Earl Johnson, a neighbour of the Frye family. A desk, numerous portraits and caricatures of Frye, as well as a large and important collection of works by and about Frye were donated to the library by the American professor and renowned Frye scholar, Robert D. Denham.

== Programs ==
- Programs for children including Babies at the Library, Toddler Time, Storytime, Crafternoon, and Science/STEAM programs.
- Programs for teens/young adults including Dungeons & Dragons, Origami Club, and monthly programs on a variety of different crafts and interests.
- Programs for adults including book clubs, Film Critics Club, and monthly programs on a variety of different crafts and literacy topics. There are also programs for seniors, including Tech & Connect, a one-on-one appointment based program for helping with tech issues, and a Senior's Card Game Social.
- Programs for all ages including Conversation Circles in a variety of languages, Family Film, and Colouring Club.
- Monthly art gallery openings to introduce new and local artists. The gallery is located on the first floor of the library.
- A Makerspace on the second floor provides access to tools related to making and creating. This includes a Cricut machine, medium and large button makers, and a sewing machine. All tools are used in the Makerspace with a library card.
- 3D printing service allows patrons to request a design for a small fee.
- Services for patrons with print disabilities including an adaptive computer workstation with SystemAccess, Zoomtext, OpenBook and Kurzweil 3000.

== Fundraising ==
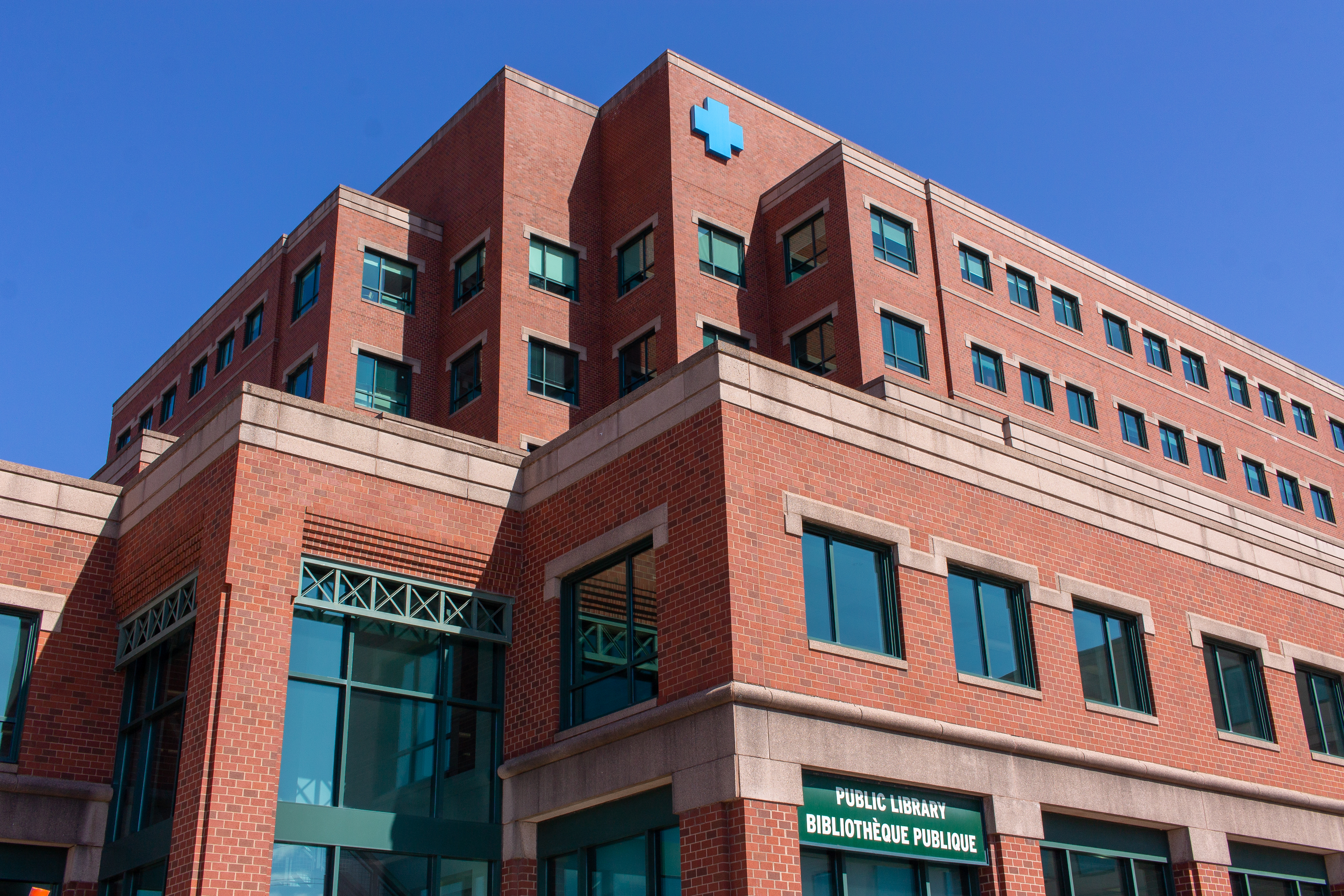
The Moncton Public Library viewed from the South.

The Magnum Opus Gala and Art Auction was the Moncton Public Library's main fundraising event from 2007 to 2010. Taking place in October the art auction was an opportunity to raise funds for improvement of library collections, but also offered "artists across Atlantic Canada the opportunity to get exposure for their work and the chance to sell a piece of their art."

In May 2026, the Moncton Public Library Board hosted the 5th 100 Artists fundraiser for the library. They collected 6x6 art pieces from community members that were then sold to guests during the fundraiser. All proceeds went to the library's collection.
