= Maison Lafrance =

Canadian university dormitory

Résidence Lafrance
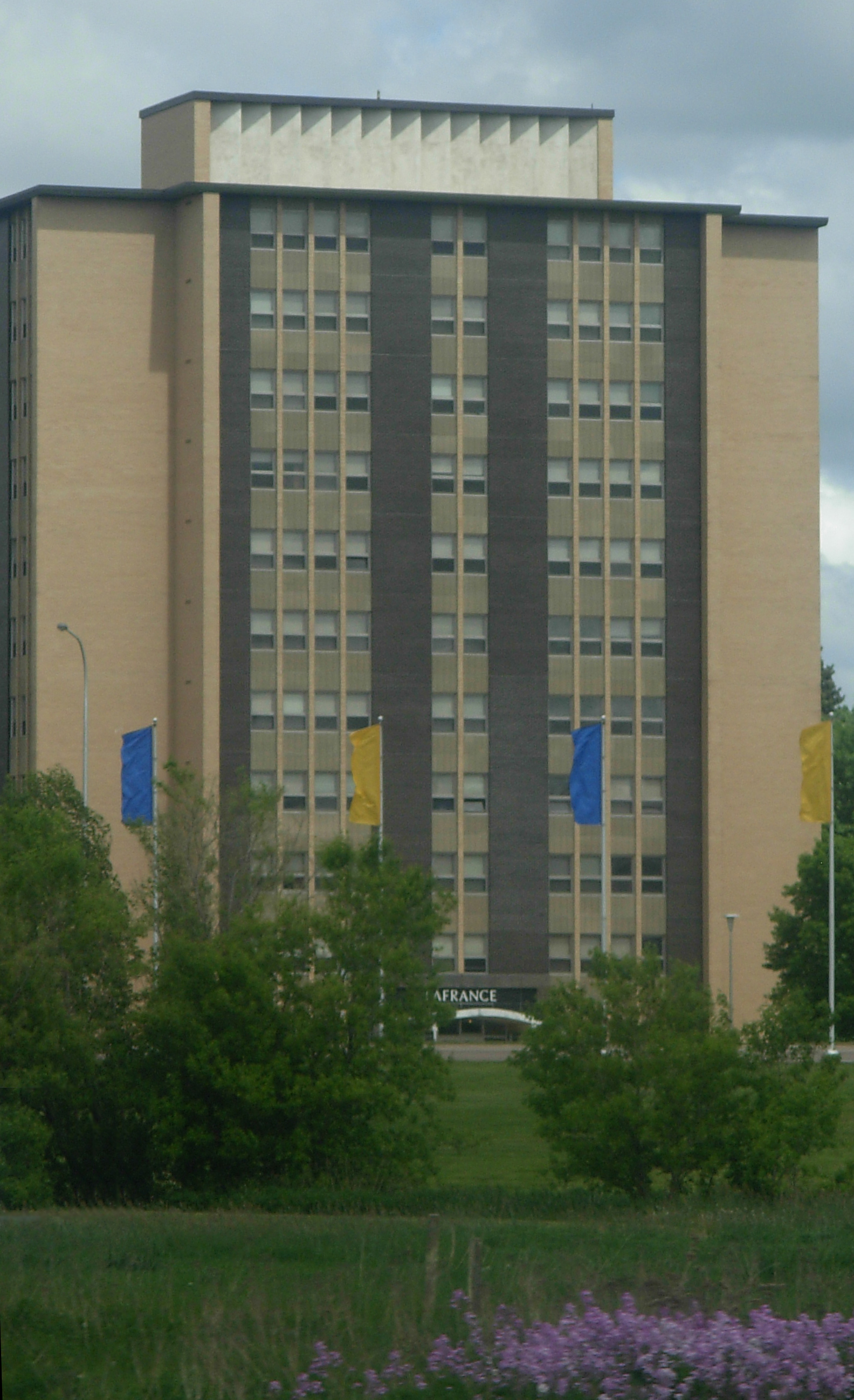
- Interactive map of the Résidence Lafrance area

General information
- Type: Dormitory
- Location: 59 Rue Clément-Cormier Moncton, New Brunswick, Canada
- Coordinates: 46.1028°N 64.7842°W
- Opening: 1962
- Owner: Université de Moncton

Height
- Roof: 41.0 m (134.5 ft)

Technical details
- Floor count: 11
- Lifts/elevators: 2

Résidence Lafrance, (transl. Lafrance Residence) is a co-ed dormitory on the campus of the Université de Moncton in Moncton, New Brunswick, Canada. It is named after abbot Xavier-François Lafrance, the first resident priest of the Tracadie parish.

With 160 rooms and 11 floors, it is the largest residence at the university. The building is one of the original structures built for the opening of the university in 1962. At 11 floors, the residence is one of the tallest buildings in Moncton.

The Residence Lafrance sits on 59 Rue Clement Cormier located next to the Université de Moncton its height is around 41 metres (135 ft).

== See also ==
- List of tallest buildings in Moncton
