= Assumption Place =

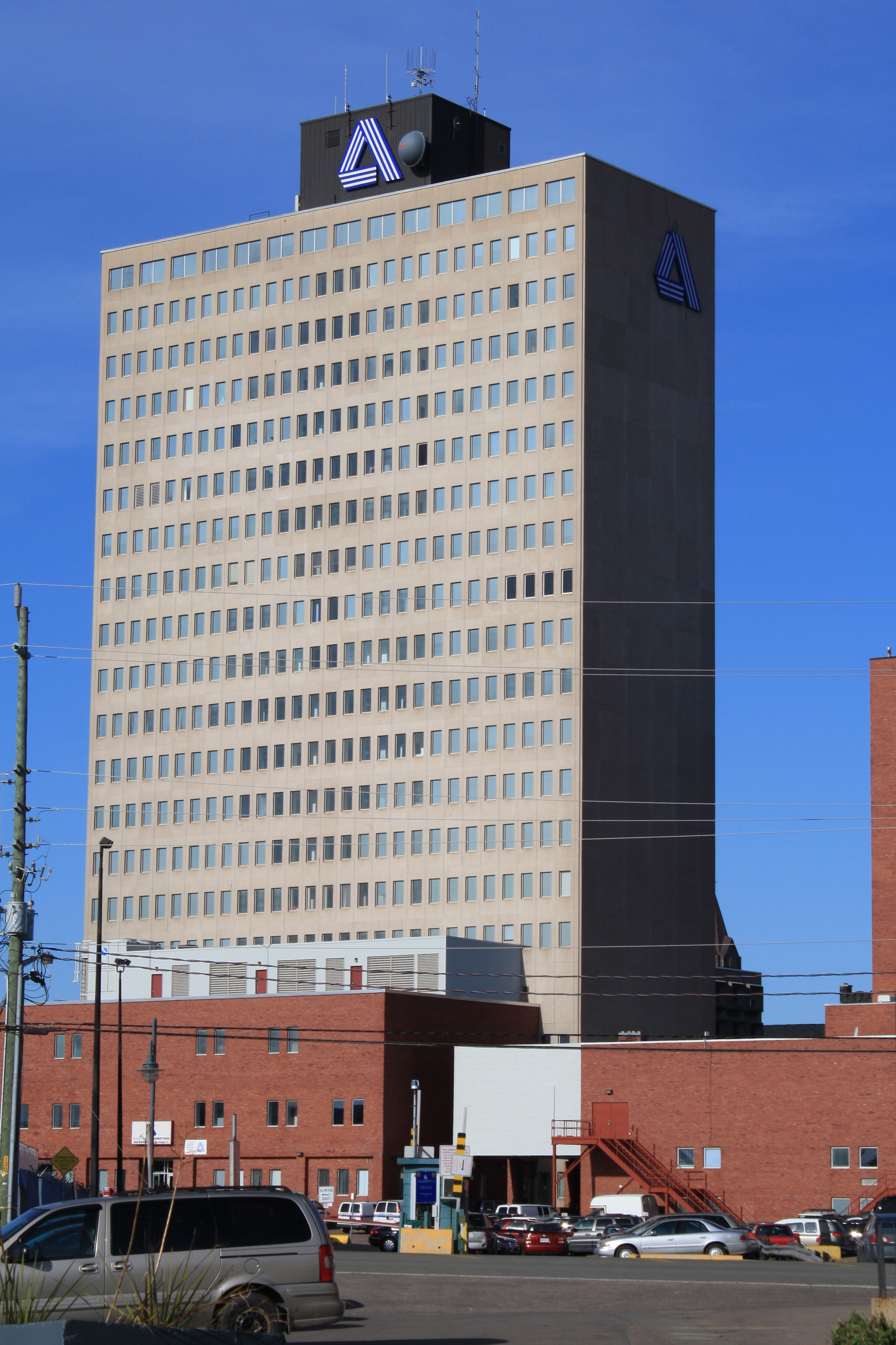
- Interactive map of the Assumption Place area

General information
- Type: Office
- Location: Moncton, New Brunswick, 766 Main Street
- Coordinates: 46.08802°N 64.77716°W
- Completed: 1972
- Owner: Assumption Place Ltd.

Height
- Roof: 80.8 m (265 ft)

Technical details
- Floor count: 20
- Floor area: 407,855 sq ft (37,891.0 m^{2})
- Lifts/elevators: 4

Website
- indigoneo.ca/en/car-park/b006-assumption-place

Assumption Place is an office building in Moncton, New Brunswick, Canada. It is the headquarters of Assumption Life. It is tied for the title of tallest office building in New Brunswick with the Brunswick Square in Saint John, New Brunswick. The building has the most levels of any building in New Brunswick at 20. In 1970 the City of Moncton approved the building. At that time NBTel realized the building would be high enough to block radio signals coming from the 135 ft (41 m) tower they had at that time in downtown Moncton. This was the reason for the construction of the NBTel Tower, now called the Bell Aliant Tower.

Place Assomption should not be confused with the former Assomption Building at 236 St George Street, which was built in 1955. Today that particular structure is known as Maison Commerce House.

== See also ==
- List of tallest buildings in Moncton
