= Moncton Law Courts =

Courthouse in Moncton, New Brunswick

- Palais de Justice Moncton
- Interactive map of the Moncton Law Courts area
- Alternative names: Moncton Courthouse

General information
- Status: Completed
- Type: Courthouse
- Location: 145 Assumption Blvd., Moncton, New Brunswick, Canada
- Coordinates: 46°05′12″N 64°46′34″W
- Opened: May 13, 2011
- Cost: CA$50 million
- Owner: Government of New Brunswick
- Landlord: Real Estate 360

Design and construction
- Developer: Citigroup Properties

The Moncton Law Courts (French: Palais de Justice Moncton) is a courthouse building in Downtown Moncton, New Brunswick. It is one of several courthouses which host hearings of the Court of King's Bench of New Brunswick and the Provincial Court of New Brunswick.

During construction, the complex came under fire for the almost double price tag of the initial cost of completion.
