= Magnetic Hill (Moncton) =

Gravity hill in New Brunswick, Canada

Coordinates: 46.136319°N 64.889696°W

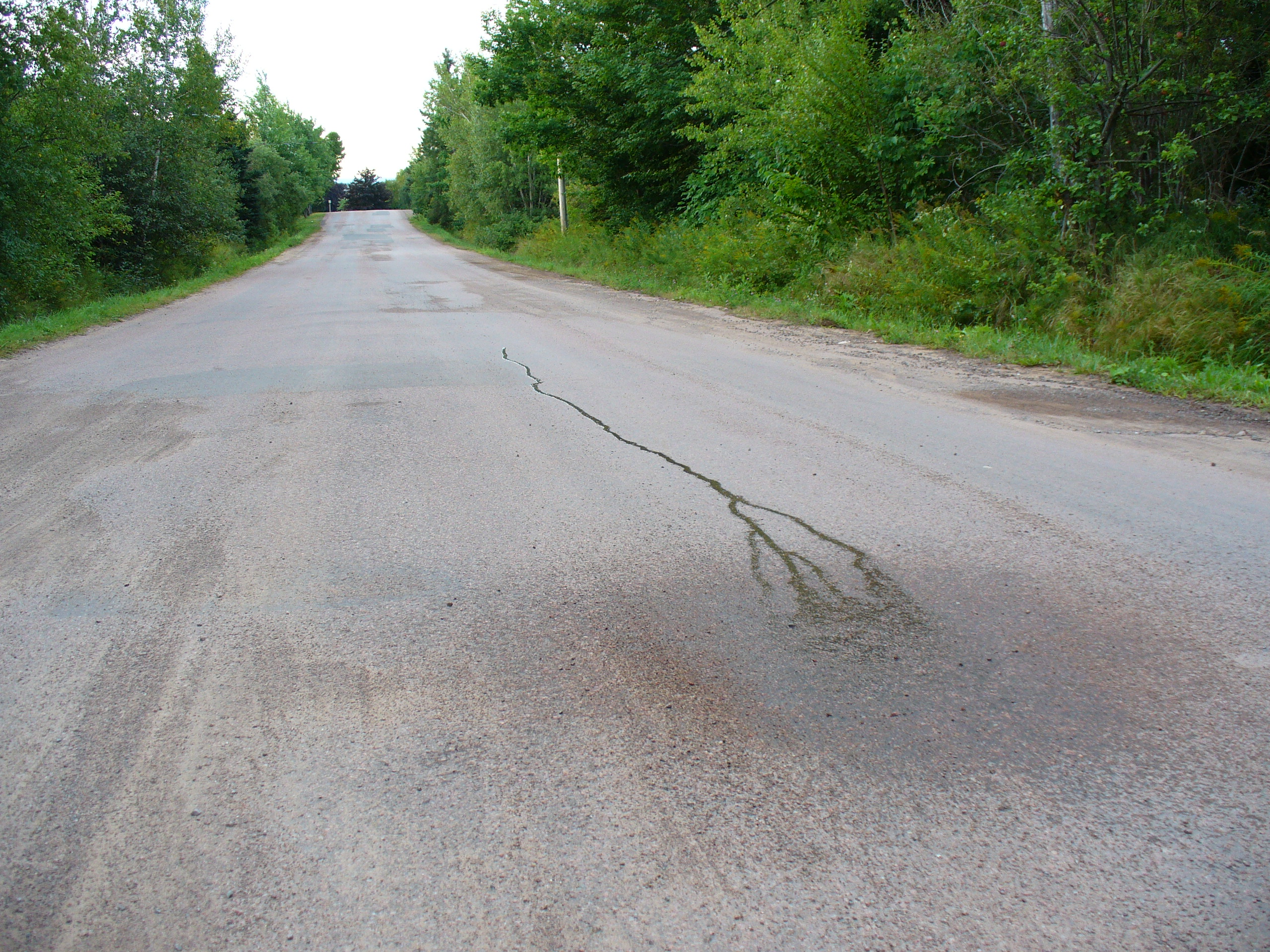
Water appearing to run uphill at Magnetic Hill

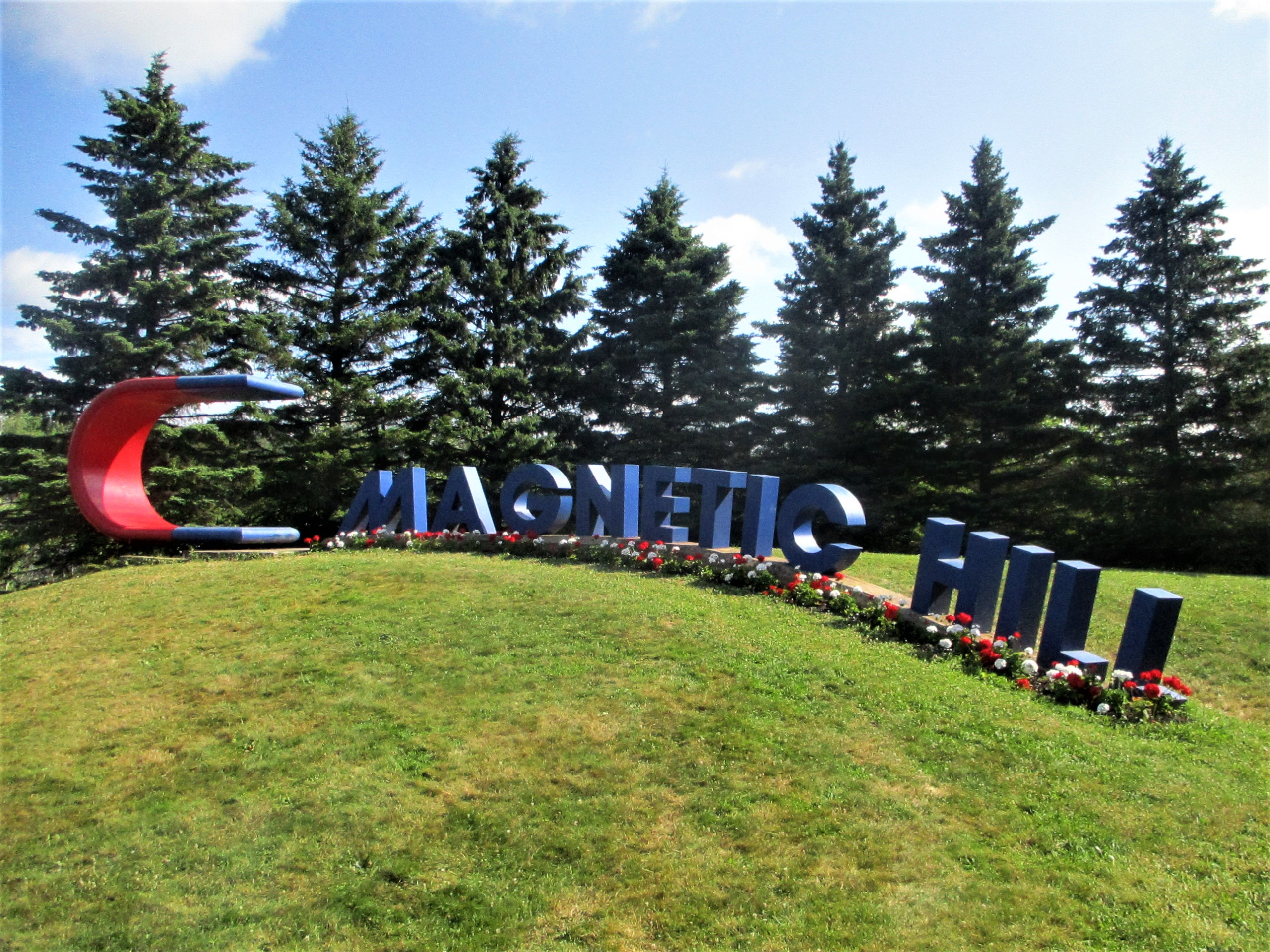
Magnetic Hill-Moncton

The Magnetic Hill is a Canadian gravity hill, a type of optical illusion created by rising and descending terrain. It is located at the northwestern edge of the city of Moncton in the Canadian province of New Brunswick.

The general area is at the base of a ridge named "Lutes Mountain", which rises several hundred feet above the surrounding Petitcodiac River valley.

== History ==
Cover of 1969 tourist pamphlet for Magnetic Hill

With the rise in tourism after the Second World War, the roughly 1 kilometre segment of gravel road became one of Moncton's prime tourist attractions (along with the tidal bore on the Petitcodiac River). Magnetic Hill is now a historic property.

== See also ==
- Magnetic Hill Concert Site
- Magnetic Hill Area
- Magnetic Hill Zoo
- Magic Mountain
- List of magnetic hills
- Lutes Mountain, New Brunswick
