= Victoria Park, New Brunswick =

Park in Moncton, New Brunswick, Canada

Coordinates: 46.092579°N 64.789553°W

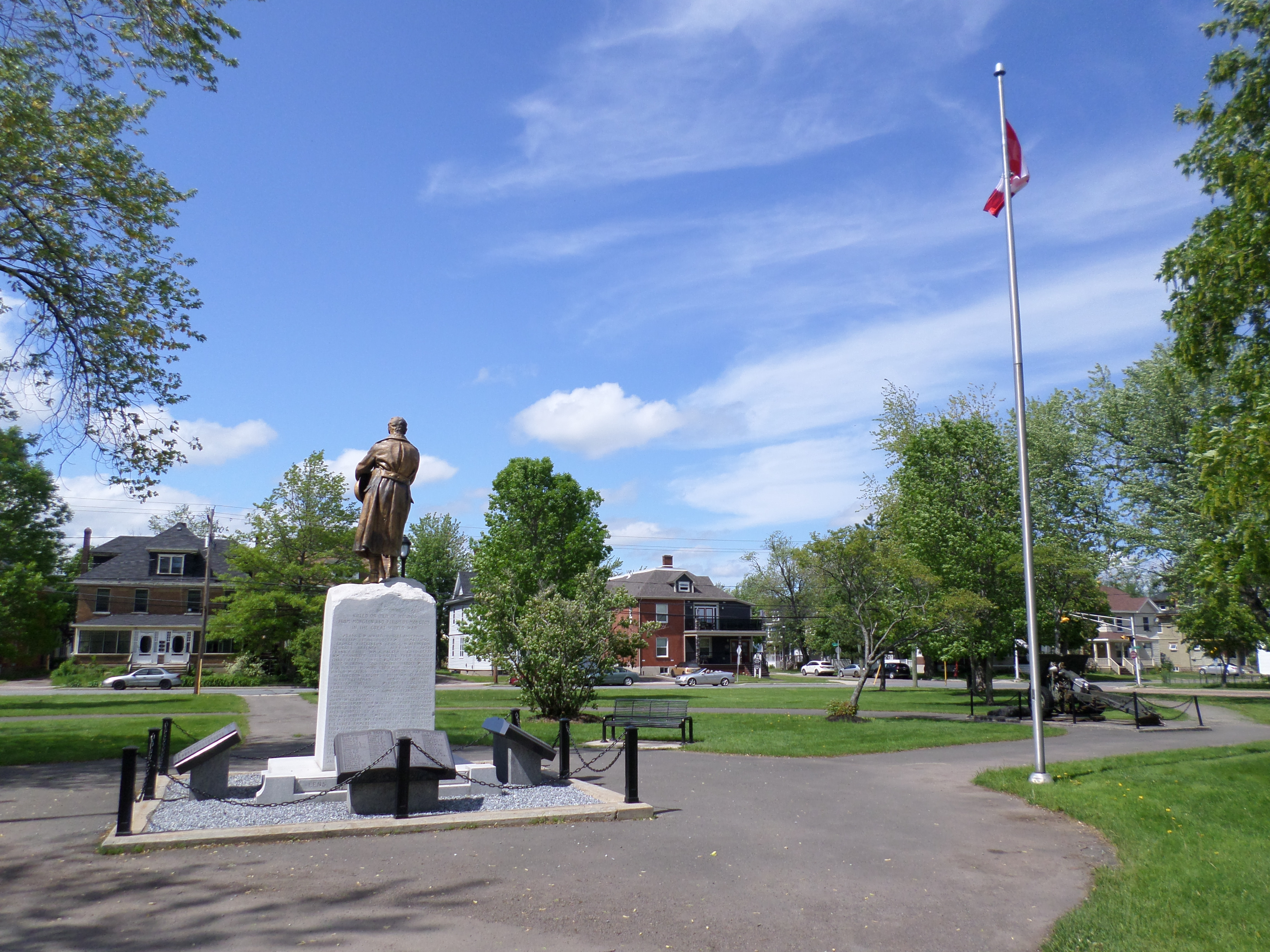
The World War I cenotaph at Victoria Park, a World War II artillery battery is also seen on the right

Victoria Park is a rectangular well-manicured and mature urban green space in Downtown Moncton containing monuments, a bandstand, fountain and walking paths. It is bound by John Street to the north, Cameron Street to the west, Weldon Street to the east and Park Street to the south. It is also contains a cenotaph and is the site of the city's annual Remembrance Day ceremony. Various footpaths allows visitors to navigate the different features of the park. Victoria Park has served as the backdrop for significant community events, including royal visits, commemorative celebrations and annual craft fairs.

== History ==
It was only a grassy field called the Moncton Commons when it was donated to the City of Moncton by the Moncton Land Company (John A. Humphrey, Michael Spurr Harris and Christopher P. Harris) in 1901. The original park concept, called Victoria Square, was developed over the following 14 years.

== Monuments ==
- 1921 monument to members of the Moncton Land Company.
- 1922 World War I Cenotaph by Emanuel Hahn.
- World War II artillery gun monument to the 8th Field Battery R. C. A. (Overseas) Association.
- 2000 twin monuments to fallen firefighters and police officers.

== See also ==
- Centennial Park
- Royal eponyms in Canada
