= Today's Trucking =

- 25th Anniversary special edition of Today's Trucking August 2012
- Categories: Business to Business
- Frequency: Monthly
- Circulation: 54,000
- Publisher: Joe Glionna
- First issue: August 1987
- Company: Newcom Media
- Country: Canada
- Based in: Toronto
- Website: todaystrucking.com

Today's Trucking is a Canadian magazine for the heavy duty trucking industry. The magazine is based in Toronto, Ontario, Canada.

== History and profile ==
Today's Trucking was founded in 1987 by Jim Glionna, Rolf Lockwood, Phil Knox, Tony Hohenadel and Wilson Smith. The magazine's current Editor-In-Chief, as of 2016, is John G. Smith. Today's Trucking is published monthly. The magazine was a bi-monthly publication (issued once every two months) until April 1988 when it became a monthly publication.

Until 2011, the magazine used to be delivered to subscribers only and it had around 29 000 subscribers. But as of 2011, Today’s Trucking replaced a sister magazine called Highway Star in truck stops. About 40 000 Highway Star magazines were delivered to truck stops across Canada until the magazine was discontinued in 2011. Its last issue was August 2011. As of 2012, Today’s Trucking was delivered to truck stops across Canada as well as by subscription. In total, 54 000 magazines were distributed across Canada.

Today's Trucking is owned by Newcom Media, which also owns Truck News, Truck West, Truck Tech, Truck & Trailer, Transport Routier, Plumbing & HVAC and Cars, as well as three trucking expositions: Truck World, Expocam and Vocational Truck & Equipment Expo.

In 2012, Today’s Trucking won the Canadian Society of Magazine Editors (CSME) award for Trade Magazine of the year. Truck Writers of North America (TWNA) presented founding editor, Rolf Lockwood, with the TWNA lifetime achievement award.

== Staff ==
- Founding editor: Rolf Lockwood
- Editor: Peter Carter (July 2004 – 2016)
- Editor: John G. Smith (2016–Present)
