= Magnetic Hill Zoo =

- Magnetic Hill Zoo's current logo, featuring an African Lion.
- Interactive map of Magnetic Hill Zoo
- 46.137441°N 64.884825°W
- Date opened: 1953
- Location: 125 Magic Mountain Road; Moncton, New Brunswick; E1G 6A9
- Land area: 16 hectares (40 acres)
- No. of animals: 400+
- No. of species: 70+
- Annual visitors: 200,000 (2024)
- Memberships: Canadian Association of Zoos and Aquariums
- Website: www.moncton.ca/magnetichillzoo

The Magnetic Hill Zoo (French: le Zoo de Magnetic Hill, formerly the Magnetic Hill Game Farm) is a 16-hectare (40-acre) zoo located inside the Magnetic Hill Park, in Moncton, New Brunswick. This park also features the Magnetic Hill, Magic Mountain and the Wharf Village. The zoo has over 400 animals, making it the largest zoo in Atlantic Canada. In 2008, the zoo was rated fourth on a list of Canada's top ten zoos.

The zoo has been an accredited member of Canada's Accredited Zoos and Aquariums (CAZA) since 1993.

== History ==
The Magnetic Hill Zoo began as the Magnetic Hill Game Farm in 1953. Originally, the game farm was home to orphaned and injured indigenous species like owls, bears, and deer. The city of Moncton took over the park in 1979 and began acquiring more exotic species which served as a catalyst for the renaming the farm to Magnetic Hill Zoo.

In 1995, the zoo began a 10-acre (4.0 ha) expansion called the African Oasis. At the same time, the zoo also expanded by adding the Primate Conservation Centre, frog bog, the koi pond, bird garden, the Camel-Zebra exhibit, and a children's playground.

In 1997–98, the Insectarium exhibit, a new entrance building, and new food facilities were built. The bears were moved to a new exhibit, which permitted them to live in a natural habitat for the first time. The zoo's education programs received an Achievement Award from CAZA- Canada’s Accredited Zoos and Aquariums.

A new reptile house exhibit, known as the Ecodome, was opened in 2003. The Ecodome was built on the site of the former bear "pit" exhibit. The Ecodome was awarded the Environmental Enrichment Award by CAZA. Exhibits for the barbary sheep and bison were also completed.

A new expanded Education Centre with three classrooms, washrooms, an office, kitchen, first aid room, and Discovery Centre were added in 2003.

Between 2003 and 2004, exhibits were expanded or refurbished, including habitats for the otters, wolves, watusi, and eland. A deer contact area was constructed.

In 2005, construction began on the Pridelands exhibit, a habitat for lions and ostrich. The exhibit's grand opening was held in July 2006 and won the Canada's Accredited Zoos and Aquariums Environmental Enrichment Award for the exhibit. A new food concession stand was also renovated in 2005 and the zoo was awarded the New-Brunswick Top Attraction Status.

In 2006, significant upgrades were made to the walking path system and signage in order to make the zoo more accessible to the public.

In 2008, a new Cougar Country Exhibit was built which was awarded the zoos third CAZA Environmental Enrichment Award.

In 2009, a new Jaguar Exhibit was built beside the Cougar Country Exhibit built the previous year. The zoo's animal collection was expanded to include mandrills, colobus monkeys, and two African lion cubs. The former Insectarium exhibit was renovated and reopened as ‘The Container’.

== Friends of the Zoo ==
The zoo is supported heavily by a fund-raising organization, Friends of the Zoo, which was founded in 1989 by Shirley Dingley, Deborah Fisher, Bruce Dougan, and Carolyn Dunlop. Friends of the Zoo focus primarily on raising funds to improve animal habitats at the zoo.

In 2014, the park unveiled the December long special event "Wild Lights". The Magnetic Hill Zoo displays hundreds of thousands of holiday lights throughout its 40-acre park. The park chooses different species to highlight each year, with conservation efforts and donations being focused on those species. The attraction is usually open during the entire month of December and closed on December 24 and December 25.

The "Boo at the Zoo" special event is usually held on the last two weekends of October. The park hosts a family-friendly Halloween themed zoo experience featuring decorations and mild, moderate to scary Halloween venues. Children are encouraged to wear their Halloween costumes to venture around the Zoo.

== Animals ==
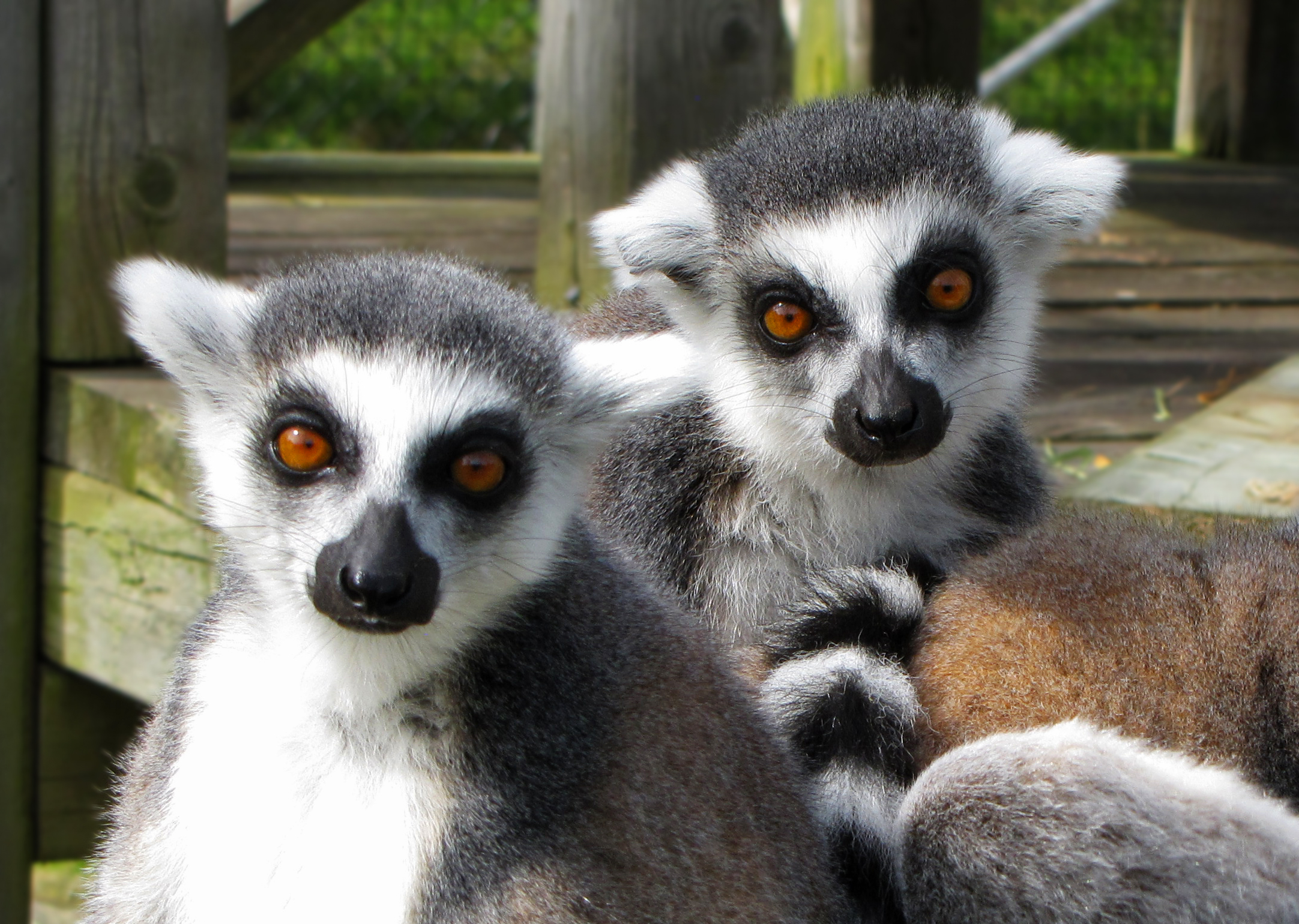
Two ring-tailed lemurs (Lemur catta) at the Magnetic Hill Zoo.

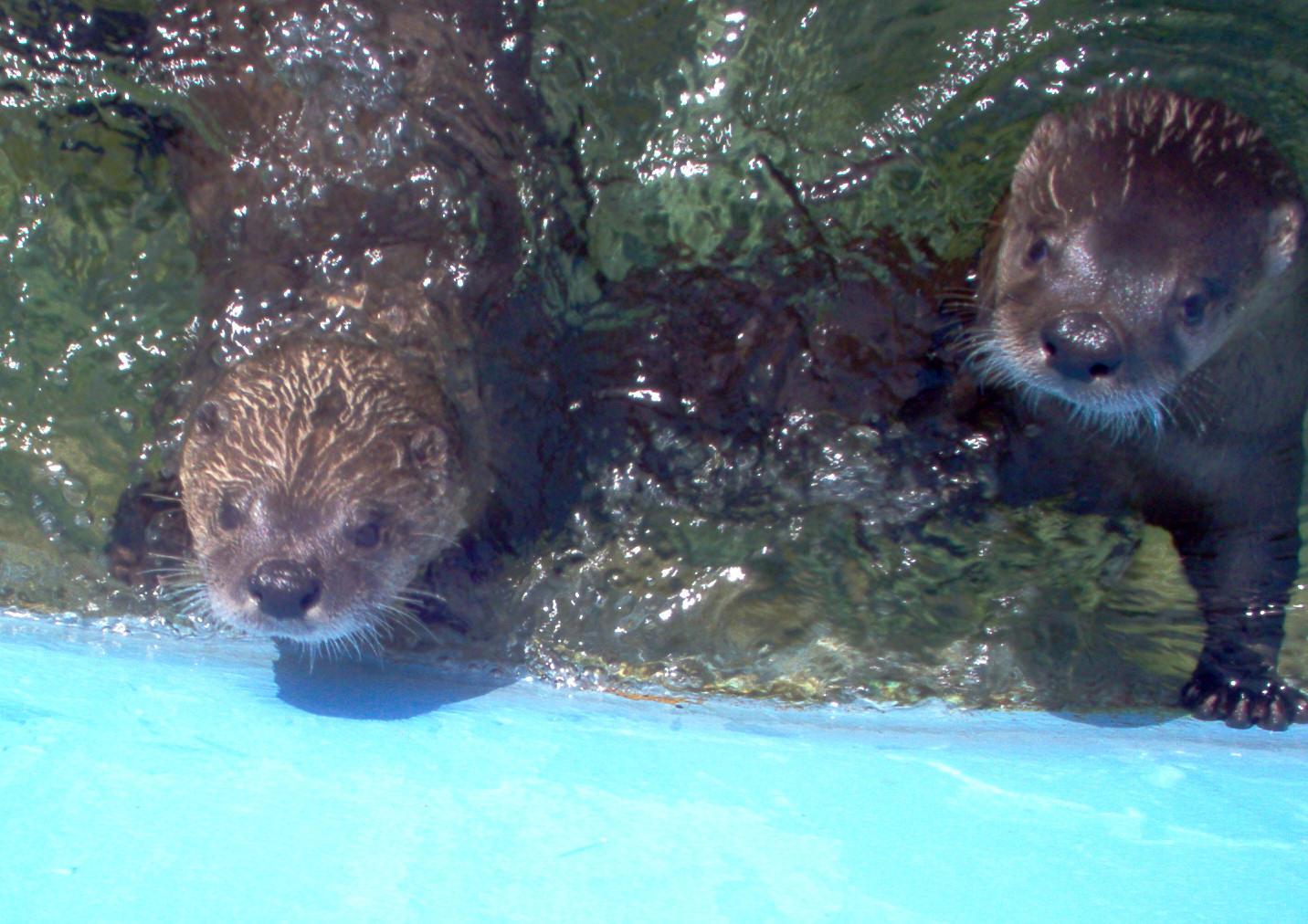
Two river otters (Lontra canadensis) at the Magnetic Hill Zoo.

Magnetic Hill Zoo has more than 400 animals, including over 70 domestic and exotic species of birds, mammals, insects, reptiles and fish. They are exhibited in 4 different exhibits.

=== Africa ===
This section houses animals from all over Africa. Their animals feature African lions, Burchell's zebras, dromedary camels, black-and-white ruffed lemurs, Ankole-Watusi cattle, ostriches, Barbary sheep, Angolan colobus monkeys, ring-tailed lemurs, lar gibbons, and siamangs.

=== Asia ===
This section is the newest and the smallest section. They have animals such as Amur tigers, Amur leopards and barn owls.

=== Americas ===
This section houses animals from around the Americas. They have animals like boreal caribou, American black bears, red foxes, white-tailed deer, Indian peafowl, Canada geese, black jaguars, squirrel monkeys, blue-and-gold macaws, greater rheas, fallow deer, alpacas, Andean condors, western cougars, Arctic wolves, Muscovy ducks, and white collared peccaries.

=== Discovery Zone ===
This section houses mainly domestic animals. They include emus, Caribbean flamingos, Dutch Bantam chickens, Kunekune pigs, donkeys, red-necked wallabies, Flemish Giant rabbits, silkie chickens, Tarpan horses, Nigerian Dwarf goats, reticulated pythons, guinea pigs, budgerigars, North American river otters, meerkats, red-eared slider turtles, bearded dragons, dwarf caimans, and common marmosets.

== See also ==
- List of zoos in Canada
- List of aquaria in Canada
