= Blue Cross Centre =

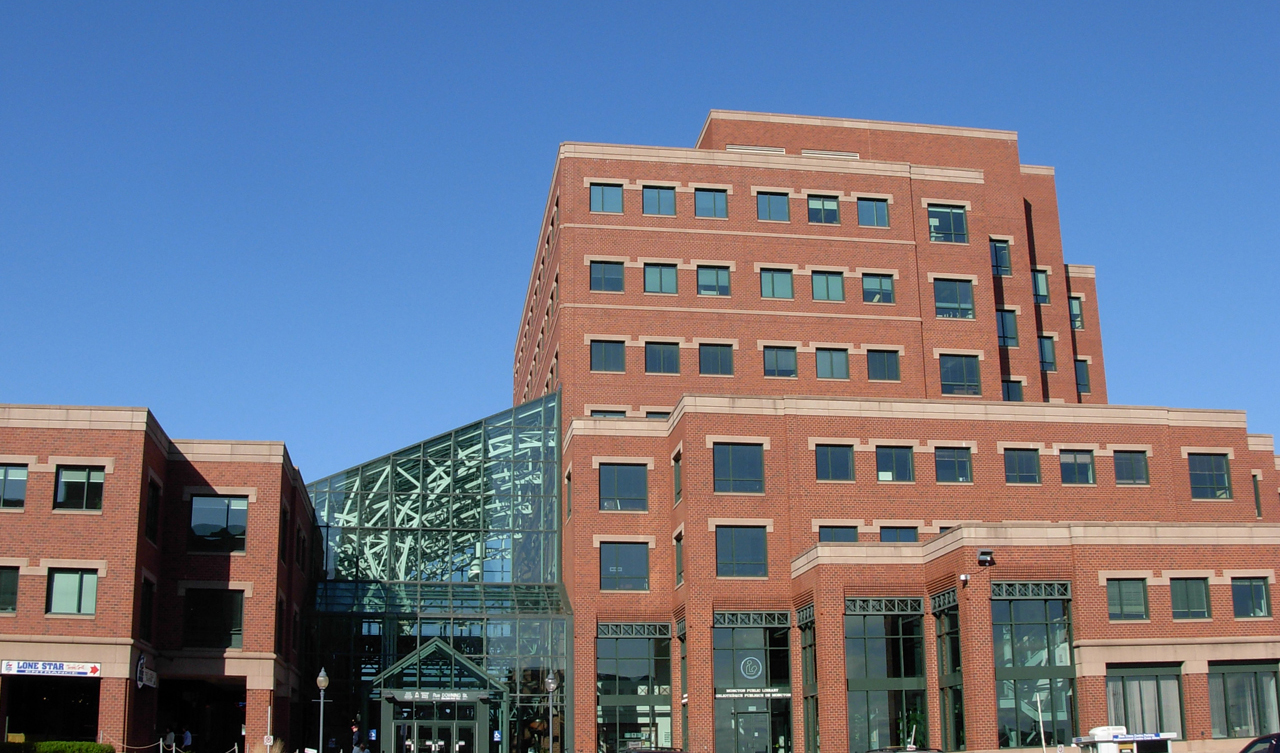
- Interactive map of the Blue Cross Centre area

General information
- Type: Office, Library
- Architectural style: Postmodern
- Location: 644 Main St. Moncton
- Coordinates: 46.08886°N 64.77467°W
- Completed: 1988
- Owner: Fortis Inc.

Height
- Roof: 43.0 m (141.1 ft)

Technical details
- Floor count: 9
- Floor area: 325,000 sq ft (30,200 m^{2})
- Lifts/elevators: 9

The Blue Cross Centre is a large and prominent office building located in the central business district of Moncton, New Brunswick.

The building features a three-story section facing Main Street and a nine-story tower to the south joined by an atrium. The building was constructed in 1988 and now encloses a total area of 30,200 m^{2} (325,000 sq ft). It includes a retail level as well as the main branch of the Moncton Public Library.

The building is currently owned and managed by Slate Office REIT. The largest tenants are the Medavie Blue Cross Insurance Company and the Atlantic Canada Opportunities Agency.

It is attached to the BMO building across Main Street via an enclosed, over-road pedestrian walkway.

== 2006 expansion ==
In 2006 The Blue Cross Centre added a new four-story building to its roster, which expanded the Blue Cross Center by 5,300 m^{2} (57,000 sq ft), for a total GLA of 30,200 m^{2}. The expansion is connected to the existing building through an enclosed pedestrian walkway.

== Atrium ==
The building encloses the two sides with an all-glass Atrium. The atrium incorporates several large planters, a fountain, 4 indoor overhead walkways, 2 glass elevators, and several shops.

== See also ==
- List of tallest buildings in Moncton
