= Resurgo Place =

Coordinates: 46.0940°N 64.7747°W

- Established: 1973
- Location: 20 Mountain Road Moncton, New Brunswick
- Type: Municipal

Resurgo Place in Moncton, New Brunswick, Canada is the new home of the Moncton Museum, the Transportation Discovery Centre and also houses the main Moncton Visitor Information Centre. It is located at 20 Mountain Road in downtown Moncton. After an extensive consultation process with community stakeholders and school children, the new name, Resurgo Place and a new logo was unveiled in March 2013. The name Resurgo which means “I rise again” is Latin and is the first motto (1890) of the City of Moncton.

The Free Meeting House (1821) and Cemetery which are located adjacent to Resurgo Place were designated as a National Historic Site in 1990.

The new 31,000 square foot facility, re-opened to the public on August 8, 2014, and includes new galleries, an interactive exhibition focusing on different modes of transportation, an education centre, a gift shop, a research centre and an indoor public area designed to preserve the sandstone façade of the former City Hall (1916). Hands on interactive programming will be available to the public as well as special events and programs. Travelling exhibits complement Resurgo Place's programming.

The new complex also houses collections, photographs and archives related to the history of Moncton. The Heritage Collection focuses on Moncton's rich history including displays devoted to Moncton's transportation history. Shipbuilding, the railway and aviation have played a major role in the development of Moncton as a city and as a commercial centre since the early 19th century.

== Affiliations ==
The Museum is affiliated with: CMA, CHIN, AMNB, and Virtual Museum of Canada.
