= List of tallest buildings in Moncton =

Tall buildings in Moncton
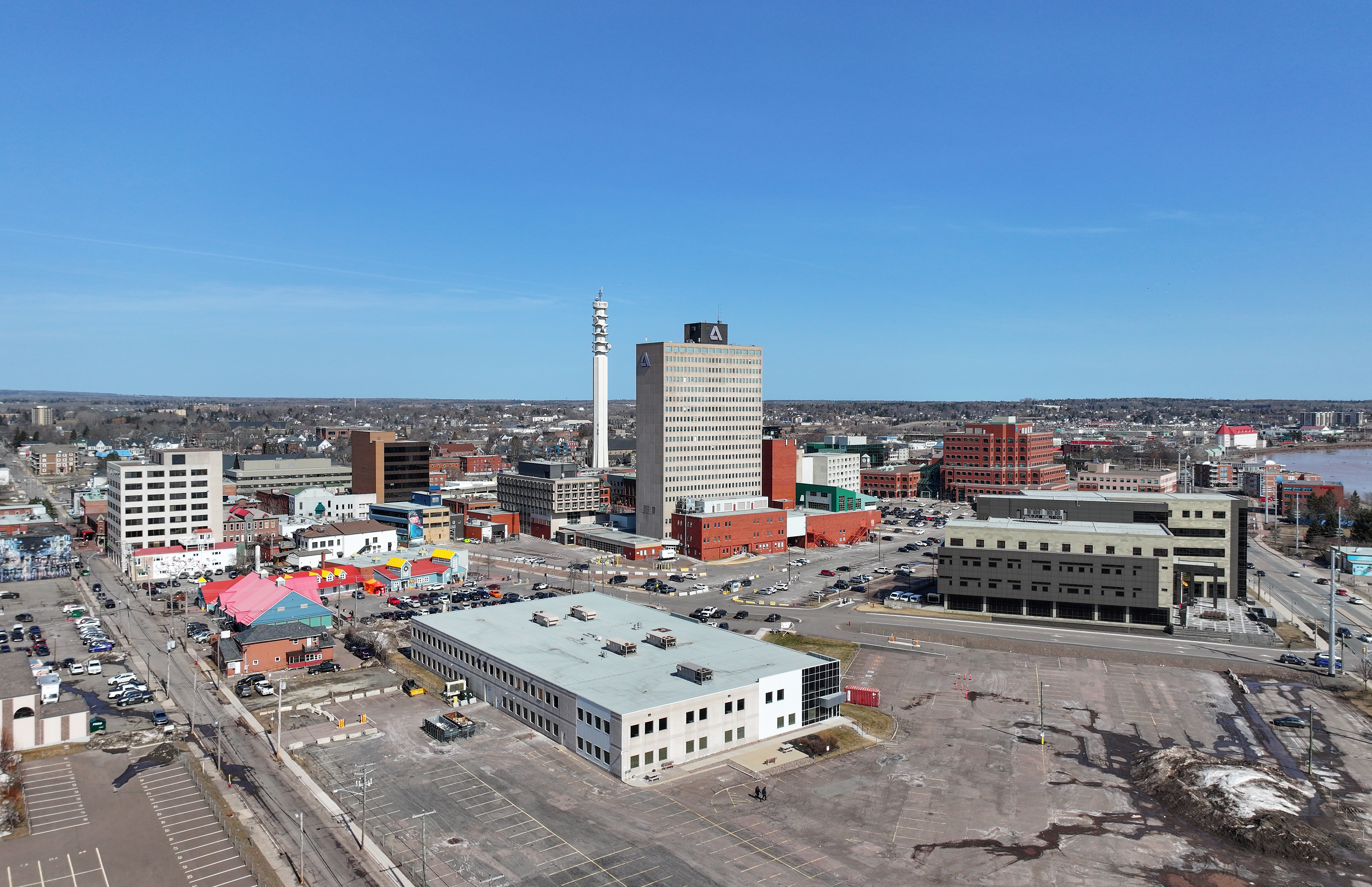
- Skyline of Moncton in 2025, with the Bell Aliant Tower and Assumption Tower prominently in view
- Population: 188k Metropolitan
- Cities included: Moncton, Riverview, Dieppe
- Tallest building: Assumption Place (1972)
- Tallest building height: 80.8 m (265 ft)
- Tallest structure: Bell Aliant Tower (1971)
- Tallest structure height: 127 m (417 ft)

Number of tall buildings (2026)
- 10 stories or more: 9
- Taller than 50 m (164 ft): 2
- Taller than 75 m (246 ft): 2
- Taller than 100 m (328 ft): 1

This list of tallest buildings in Moncton ranks buildings in Moncton, New Brunswick, by height. The City of Moncton and its metropolitan area (Dieppe and Riverview) is the largest in New Brunswick, a Canadian province in the Atlantic region. Its skyline is dominated by the Bell Aliant Tower, constructed in 1971 at a height of 127 m (417 ft), Residential/General: Roughly 34 to 35+ stories (assuming 3-4 m per floor). The Bell Aliant Tower is the fifteenth tallest free-standing structure in all four Atlantic provinces.

The tallest building in the city is the 20-storey, 80.8 m (265 ft) Assumption Place. The complex, with its two adjoining mid rise structure, was completed in 1972. The second tallest building in the city is The Three Sisters along the River Complex, standing at only 49 m (161 ft) tall with 16 storeys each except for building 3. As of 2026, the city contains 1 high-rise over 80 m (262 ft) and 11 high-rise buildings that exceed 35 m (115 ft) in height. The most recent high-rises built in Moncton is the Three Sisters along the River development, a residential complex consisting of three 16-storey high-rises.

== Tallest buildings ==
This list ranks Moncton high-rises and skyscrapers that stand at least 25 metres (82 ft) tall, based on CTBUH height measurement standards. This includes spires and architectural details but does not include antenna masts. Freestanding observation and/or telecommunication towers, while not habitable buildings, are included for comparison purposes; however, they are not ranked. One such tower is the Bell Aliant Tower. Aliant Tower consists of is a 127 metre high microwave tower of reinforced concrete on a concrete base located on the southwest corner of Botsford Street and Queen Street in Downtown Moncton.

Rank	Image	Building	Height	Floors	Completed	Notes	Ref
N/A	Bell Aliant Tower	Bell Aliant Tower	127 m (417 ft)	6	1971	A reinforced concrete broadcasting tower used to provide directional radio services. It is the fifteenth tallest structure in Atlantic Canada.	
1	Assumption Place	Assumption Place	80.8 m (265 ft)	21	1972	Tied with Brunswick Square in Saint John for the tallest building in New Brunswick.	
2	Notre-Dame-de-l'Assomption Cathedral	Our Lady of the Assumption Cathedral	75 m (246 ft)+	4	1955		
3=		Three Sisters along the River III	49.3 m (155 ft)	17	2026	Tower 3 of the Three Sisters residential complex. Also includes 164 rooms.	
3=		Three Sisters along the River II	49.3 m (155 ft)	16	2025	Tower 2 of the Three Sisters residential complex. Also includes 144 rooms.	
3=		Three Sisters along the River I	49.3 m (155 ft)	16	2023	Tower 1 of the Three Sisters residential complex. Also includes 150 rooms.	
4	Blue Cross Center	Blue Cross Centre	43 m (141 ft)	9	1988	Expanded 2006.	
5		Crowne Plaza Moncton	39.9 m (131 ft)	11	1979		
6	Lafrance Residence (on the right)	Lafrance Residence	39.3 m (129 ft)	11	1962	Residential building with 160 rooms.	
7		Government Of Canada Building	38.1 m (125 ft)	9	1977		
9	The Delta Beauséjour Hotel	The Delta Beauséjour Hotel	37.8 m (128 ft)	10	1972	Renovated,1998, 2008 and includes 310 rooms.	
9	Terminal Center	Canadian National Terminal Station	37 m (121 ft)	8	1963		
10		Five Five	33.6 m (110 ft)	9	2018		
11		Andal Place	33.5 m (110 ft)	8	1972-1973	Office building.	
12		Cameron Arms	32.9 m (108 ft)	10	1981	Residential and office mix.	
13	Lions Tower	Lions Tower	31.4 m (103 ft)	10	?	Residential building.	
14	Terminal Plaza	Terminal Plaza	29.9 m (98 ft)	7	1968		
15		Moncton Place	26.8 m (88 ft)	6	1996	Office building.	

== Tallest Proposed and under construction ==
Building	Height	Floors	Completion	Status	Type
The Infinity	103.6 m (340 ft)	33	N/A	Proposed	Residential, retail, parking garage
Gateway Tower 1	53 metres (144 ft - 180 ft)	18	Expected 2026	Under Construction	Residential
Gateway Tower 2	53 metres (144 ft - 180 ft)	18	N/A	Proposed	Residential

== Other buildings and structures ==
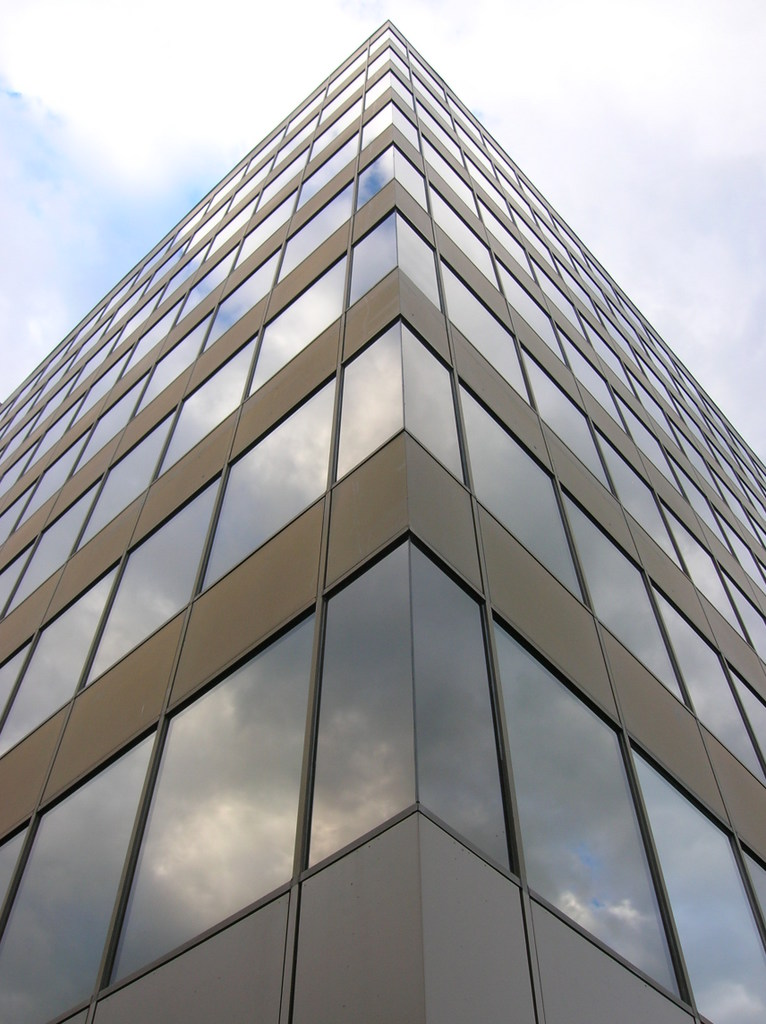
Government of Canada Building

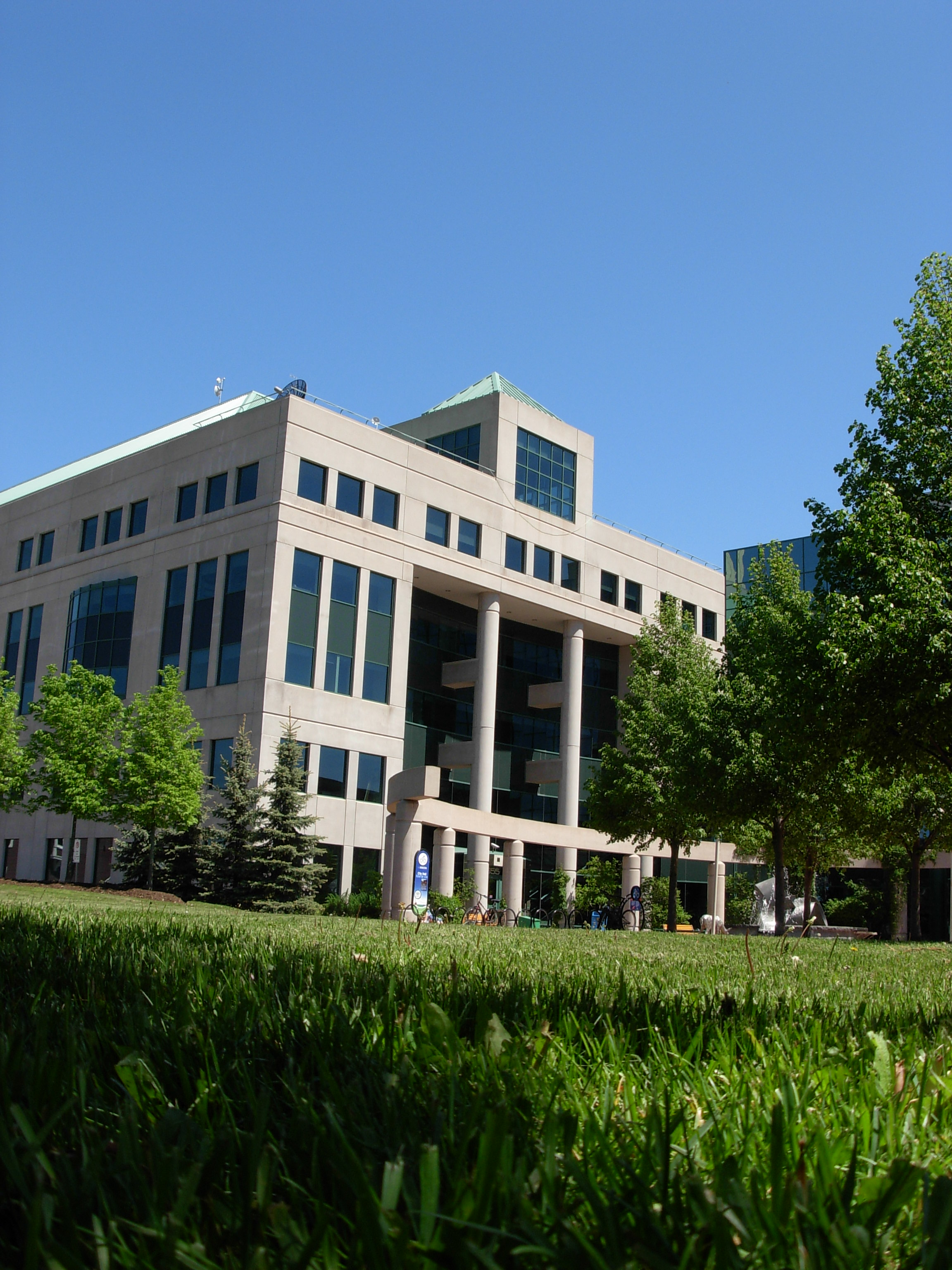
Moncton's City Hall is a modern 6 storey building, constructed in 1996.

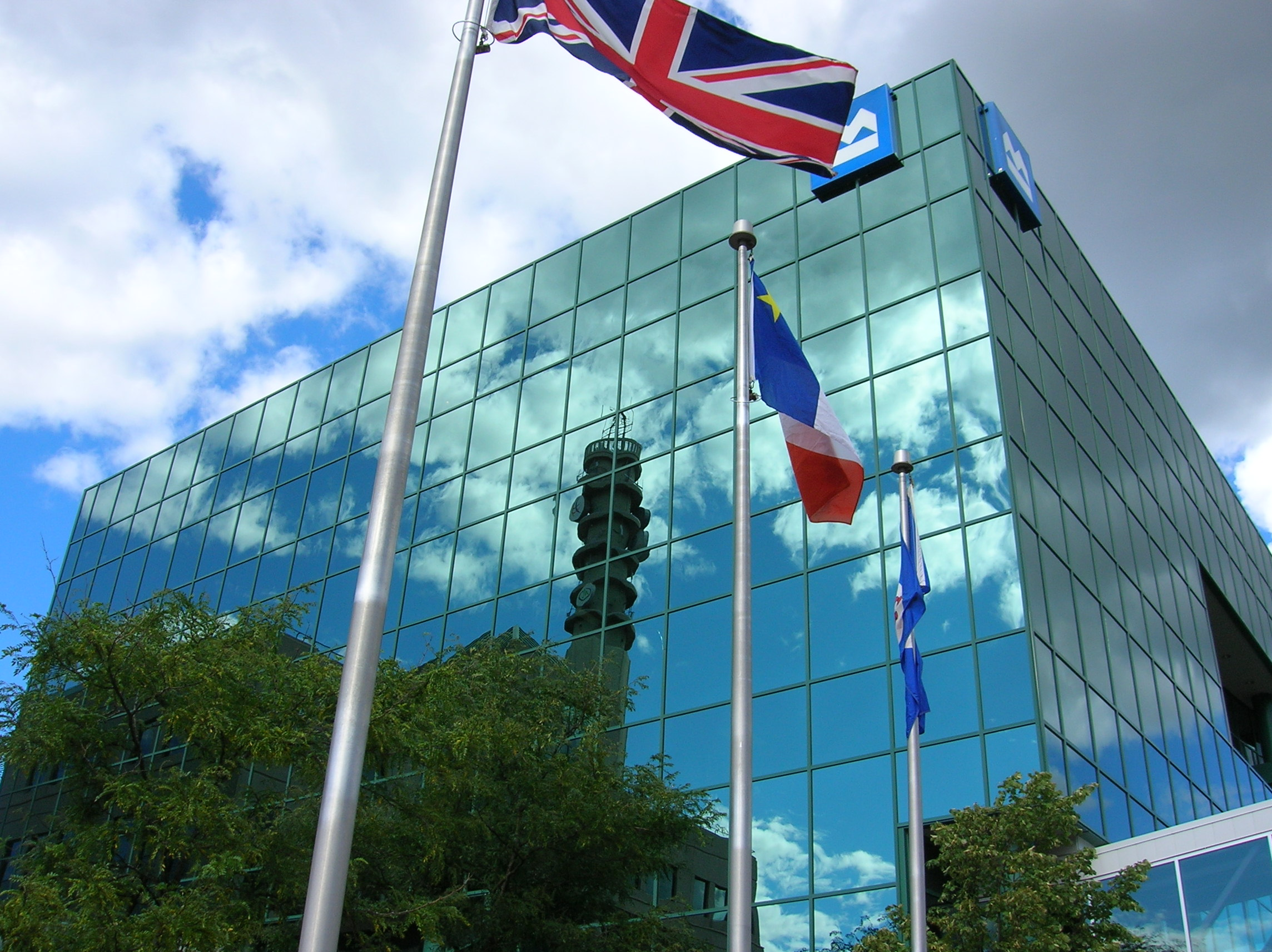
Moncton Place, a modern 6 storey Glass Tower building is the regional headquarters of the Bank of Montreal. This infrastructure has a pedway to the City Hall and the Blue Cross complex.

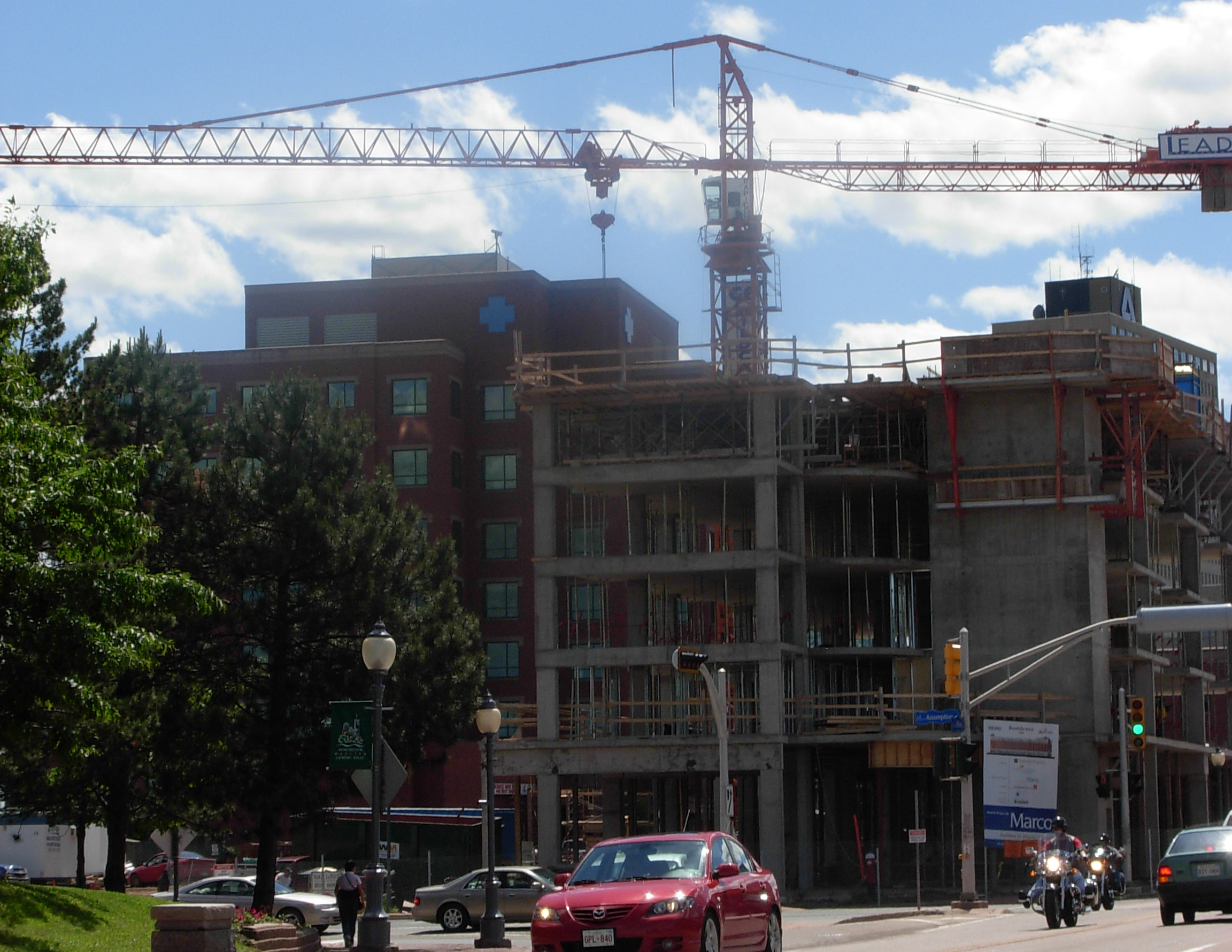
The Residence Inn by Marriott is a 6-storey, 23 metres, downtown Hotel located opposite the City Hall. It was completed and opened in 2008.

Andal Place
Constructed in 1973 and located at 860 Main Street, the low-rise 8-storey modernism style concrete building has an architectural height of 32 metres - roof 28 metres. TD Bank has been the main tenant since the early 1990s.

FEDERAL BUILDING, DOMINION PUBLIC BUILDING

Constructed between 1934 - 1936. The dignified Dominion Public Building occupies a prominent wedge-shaped site in downtown Moncton (1081 Main Stree). The symmetrical, four-storey, stone facade feature horizontal massing and classical details which are often on an exaggerated scale to achieve a monumental effect. Two-storey high round windows create a greater than actual impression of height. The designation is confined to the footprint of the building.LinksHome > Directory of Federal Heritage Designations > Federal Heritage Buildings

== See also ==
- List of buildings in Moncton
- List of tallest buildings in Atlantic Canada
