= Magic Mountain (New Brunswick) =

Water park in Canada

- Interactive map of Magic Mountain
- Location: 150 Magic Mountain Road; Moncton, New Brunswick; E1G 4V7
- Coordinates: 46.138°N 64.888°W
- Opened: June 26, 1987; 38 years ago
- Pools: 3 pools
- Water slides: 11 (3 kids) water slides
- Website: Official website

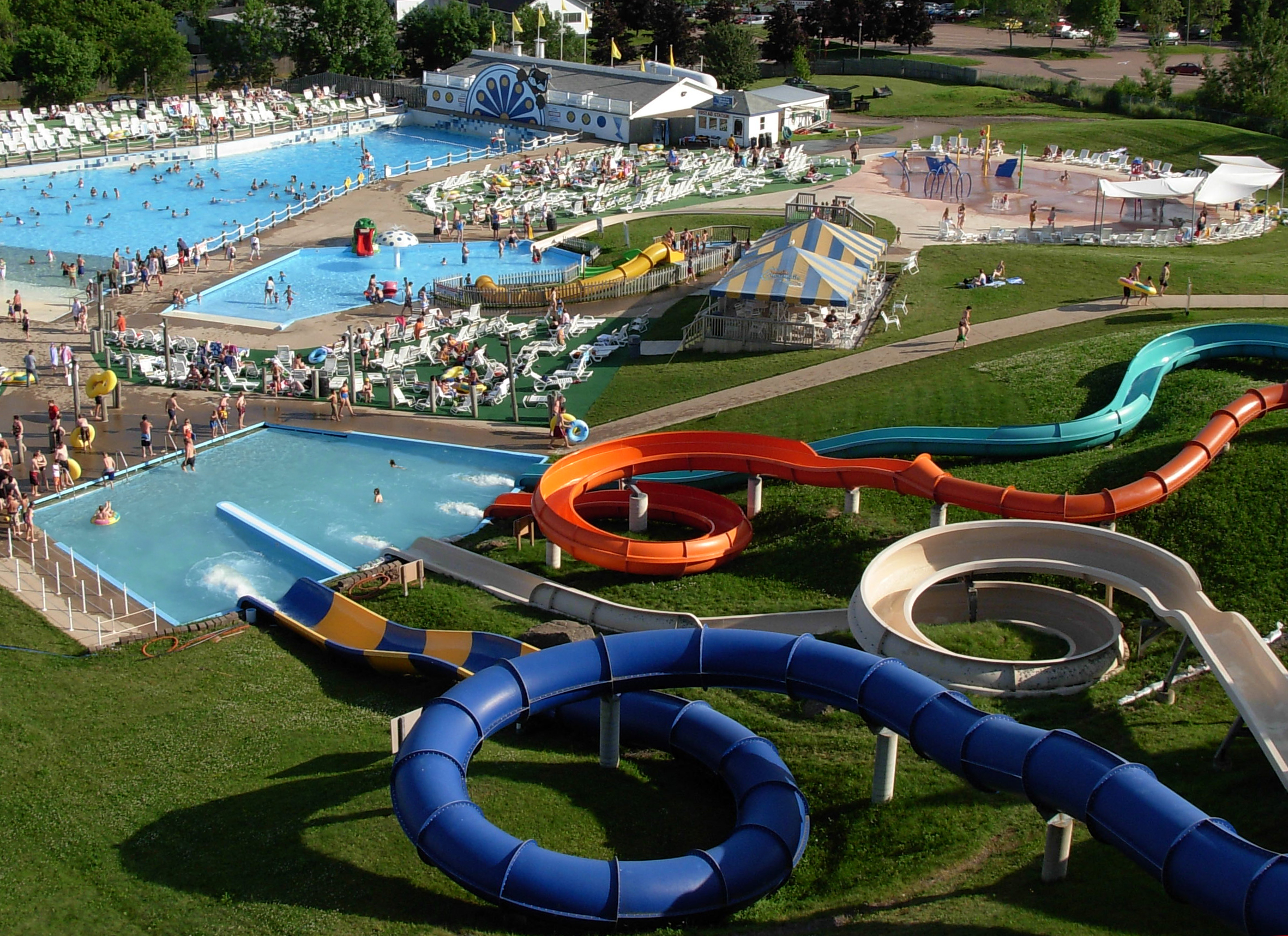
The view of the park from the top of the Kamikaze slide.

Magic Mountain (French: Parc aquatique Magic Mountain), is mainly a water park, which is located in Moncton, New Brunswick, Canada. It is part of the Magnetic Hill tourist site. The park is the largest man-made tourist attraction in Atlantic Canada.

== History ==
The park was created as an addition to the growing tourist site of Magnetic Hill, which already consisted of the hill itself, and the Magnetic Hill Zoo. Construction on the park commenced on August 12, 1986, and through the efforts of more than 600 construction workers it was completed in less than a year, opening on June 26, 1987. It requires more than 800,000 imperial gallons (3,600,000 L) of water to operate which is heated by propane heaters with a capacity of almost 7 million BTUs (7.4 gigajoules). In 1999 the park came under new ownership and since then several improvements have been made to the park. A children's "Splash pad", two new children's slides and two new body slides named "Pipeline" and "Sidewinder" were constructed. Other developments include:

- 2002 - the Tornado tube slide opened.
- 2005 - two new slides opened named Twist and Shout.
- 2006 - the Pro Racer was added.
- 2008 - an all new free-fall body slide replaced the old Kamikaze. Its name and height remains the same.
- 2011 - The Torpedo opens - Canada's first skybox drop capsule will give riders an opportunity to experience a weightless sensation.
- 2011 - The Turbo Tunnel opens - a dark body slide that propels a 720 degree figure 8 ride.

== Rides and attractions ==
- The Tornado - A 400-foot (120 m) enclosed tube slide.
- The Lazy River - A lazy river ride on which the rider sits in a tube and floats 1/4 mile (400 m) around a replica of a nineteenth century steamship.
- The Giant Twister Slides - Three body slides for the less daring riders.
- The Kamikaze - A speed slide that goes almost on a straight down drop. It is over 100 feet (30 meters) tall, sliders can reach speeds of over 60 km/h (35 mph).
- Pro Racer - A two-lane slide on which two people slide down at the same time on rubber mats.
- The Torpedo - A sky box drop capsule that lets riders experience a weightless sensation.
- The Turbo Tunnel - A dark body slide that propels riders 720 degrees.
- Puddle Jumpers Pond - A small children's wading pool with Gizmo the Frog, Pinky the Whale, and Magic Mushroom.
- The Wave pool - A large wave pool with waves up to 6 feet (1.8 meters) tall.
- Pier 36 Mini Golf - 36 holes of mini golf.
