= Government of Canada Building (Moncton) =

Office building in Moncton, New Brunswick, Canada

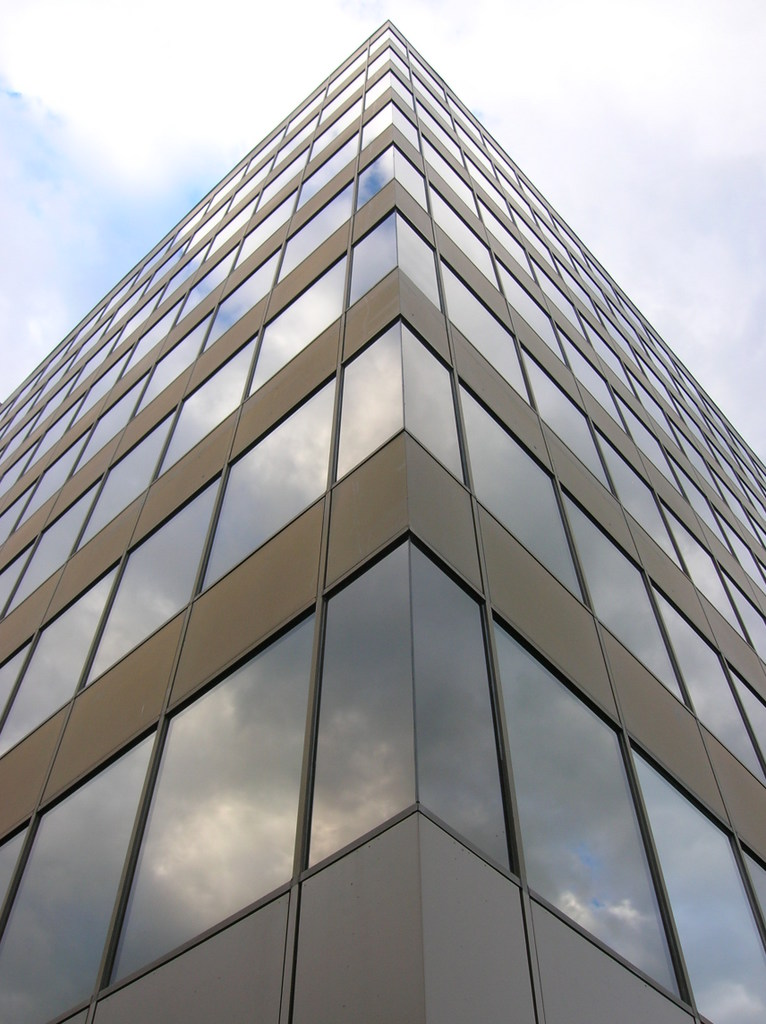
- Interactive map of the Government of Canada Building area

General information
- Type: Office
- Location: 777 Main St. Moncton
- Coordinates: 46.0886°N 64.7782°W
- Completed: 1977
- Owner: Heritage Management

Height
- Roof: 34.0 m (111.5 ft)
- Top floor: 9

Technical details
- Floor count: 9
- Floor area: 48,820 sq ft (4,536 m^{2})

The Government of Canada Building is one of the tallest buildings in Moncton, New Brunswick. The building is 34 meters tall and has 9 floors. The building was constructed in 1977 and is located at 777 Main Street in downtown Moncton. It is mainly used as offices for the Government of Canada as well as various lawyers. The entire top floor of the building is occupied by offices for Freedom 55 Financial and the Quadrus Group both divisions of the London Life Insurance Company.

The façade of this building underwent an aesthetic upgrade in 2008.

== See also ==
- List of tallest buildings in Moncton
