= Bell Aliant Tower =

Concrete tower in Moncton, New Brunswick, Canada

- The tower in 2026

General information
- Type: Telecommunications
- Location: Downtown Moncton
- Coordinates: 46°5′23.86″N 64°46′35.54″W
- Completed: 1971
- Owner: Bell Aliant

Height
- Antenna spire: 127 m (417 ft) (Equiv. to approx. 36 floors)

Technical details
- Lifts/elevators: 1

Bell Aliant Tower, formerly known as Aliant Tower and originally NBTel Tower, is a 127-metre-high (417 ft) tower of reinforced concrete located in Moncton, New Brunswick, Canada. It is used to provide directional radio services. It is the tallest structure in Moncton and the fifteenth tallest freestanding structure in Atlantic Canada.

== History ==
The NBTel Tower was the subject of litigation in John Maryon Int Ltd v. NB Telephone Co [1982] N.B.J. No. 387 (N.B. C.A.). In his decision on the case, Justice LaForest provided substantial background on the early history of the tower:

In early 1970 the New Brunswick Telephone Company, Limited (N.B.Tel) learned that plans had been approved by the City of Moncton for the construction of the Place L'Assomption development, a new high-rise business complex in the heart of the city. This development would block the transmission of microwave messages to and from N.B.Tel's 135 feet steel tower located in downtown Moncton. As a result, N.B.Tel decided to build a new and higher tower, and in June 1970 it invited several consulting engineers to submit proposals for the construction of the new tower.

John Maryon International Ltd. (Maryon International) was selected as consultant to design and arrange for its construction.

Construction work had in fact already started on September 21, 1970, when excavation for the foundation was begun. The slip form method of construction, whereby concrete is poured into forms continuously moving upwards, was recommended and used in constructing the tower shaft. The slip form began on November 4, 1970, and was finished on November 20, 1970. Other aspects of the work proceeded with similar celerity, and the tower was completed and fully operational by the following summer. It was officially opened at the beginning of June 1971.

During the construction phase of the tower, only two people ever stood on top of the red beacon at the top of the tower, Bob Sweet and John Brophi, both were engineers on the project.

At the time of its construction, Aliant Tower was the tallest microwave communications tower of its kind in North America. It remains the tallest radio tower in Atlantic Canada and is the fifteenth tallest freestanding structure in Atlantic Canada. It remains the tallest structure in Moncton dwarfing the neighbouring Place L'Assomption, one of the tallest office buildings in New Brunswick, by 46 metres. Aliant Tower is also recognized for its importance as a symbol of economical and technological growth in Moncton's history. In choosing Moncton as the location for this innovative tower, NBTel claimed to be predicting where the growth of the Province as a whole would take place. The tower's placement at the corner of Botsford Street and Queen Street is also significant. The tower sits on the site of Moncton's first telephone exchange, which was started in 1883 by George C. Peters with five subscribers.

== See also ==
- List of tallest buildings in Moncton
- List of tallest structures in Canada
