= Albert Formation =

Geologic formation in New Brunswick, Canada

- Stratigraphic range: Early Mississippian (Tournaisian); ~359–347 Ma
- Type: Formation
- Unit of: Horton Group
- Sub-units: Gautreau Member; Round Hill Member; Hiram Brook Member; Frederick Brook Member; Dawson Settlement Member
- Underlies: Moncton Formation
- Overlies: Memramcook Formation
- Thickness: Up to 1,800 m (5,910 ft)

Lithology
- Primary: Sandstone, siltstone, oil shale
- Other: Mudstone, limestone, comglomerate

Location
- Coordinates: 45.8779°N 64.6685°W
- Region: New Brunswick
- Country: Canada

Type section
- Named for: Albert County

The Albert Formation is a stratigraphic unit of Early Mississippian (Tournaisian) age in the Moncton Subbasin of southeastern New Brunswick. It was deposited in a lacustrine environment and includes fossils of fish and land plants, as well as trace fossils. It also includes significant deposits of oil shale. The oil shale beds are the source rocks for the petroleum and natural gas that has been produced from Albert Formation reservoirs at the Stoney Creek and McCully fields. In addition, the solid asphalt-like hydrocarbon albertite was mined from the Albert Formation at Albert Mines between 1854 and 1884.

== Lithology and mineralogy ==
The Albert Formation includes sandstone, siltstone, mudstone, and oil shale, with minor limestone and conglomerate. The oil shale beds are primarily kerogen-rich calcareous to dolomitic marlstones, clay marlstones, and laminated marlstones. The formation also includes local deposits of the evaporite minerals halite (rock salt), gypsum, anhydrite, and glauberite. The solid hydrocarbon albertite occurs as veins filling fissures in some of the beds, and is derived from the hydrocarbons in the oil shales.

== Environment of deposition ==
The Albert Formation has been interpreted as a composite alluvial fan, fluvial-deltaic, and lacustrine sequence. The coarser-grained lithologies are nearshore deposits, while the finer-grained rocks, including the oil shale beds, are an offshore, deeper-water assemblage. Fossils of whole fish preserved in the laminated oil shales indicate very low energy, anoxic conditions.

== Paleontology ==
The Albert Formation is known for its complete, articulated specimens of lower actinopterygian (palaeoniscoid) fishes, including the genera Rhadinichthys, Elonichthys, and Canobius. There are remains of land plants such as Lepidodendrales and Sphenopteris, as well as palynomorphs. Trace fossils include Paleodictyon, Helminthopsis, and Planolites.

== Economic resources ==
=== Oil and gas ===
The Albert Formation hosts the only two commercial onshore oil and gas fields in Canada's Maritime Provinces. The Stoney Creek field produced from sandstone reservoirs in the Albert Formation between 1909 and 1991, and estimates suggest that significant oil remains in place there. The McCully field, which was discovered in 2000, produces from tight gas sandstones in the upper part of the Albert Formation, above the main organic mudstone (oil shale) source rocks.

=== Albertite ===
Veins of the solid black hydrocarbon that was subsequently named albertite were first noted in the Albert Formation in 1820. In 1846, Abraham Gesner used albertite in developing the first method for distilling kerosene, and between 1854 and 1884 albertite was mined by underground methods at Albert Mines for use in the production of kerosene and illuminating gas.
