= Hopewell Parish =

Hopewell
- Parish
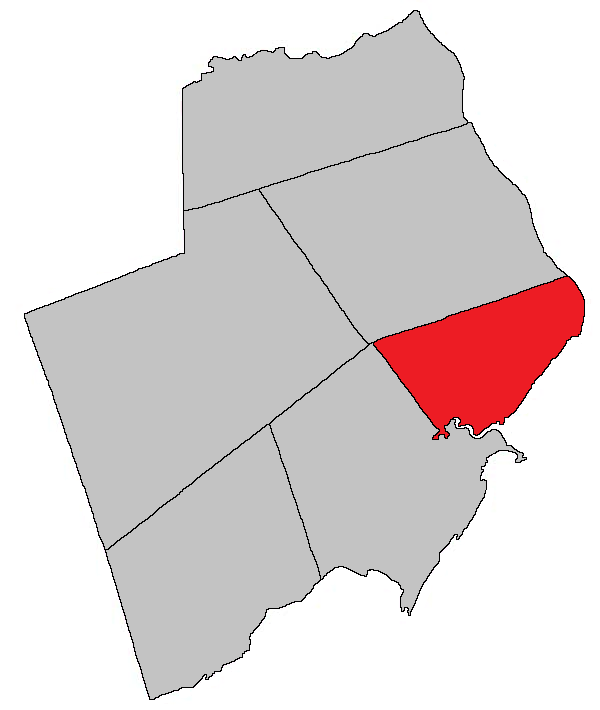
- Location within Albert County.
- Coordinates: 45.81°N 64.66°W
- Country: Canada
- Province: New Brunswick
- County: Albert
- Erected: 1786

Government
  - Type: unincorporated

Area
  - Land: 149.14 km^{2} (57.58 sq mi)

Population (2021)
  - Total: 597
  - Density: 4/km^{2} (10/sq mi)
  - Change 2016-2021: ▼7.7%
  - Dwellings: 310
- Time zone: UTC-4 (AST)
  - Summer (DST): UTC-3 (ADT)
- Figures do not include portion within the village of Hillsborough

Hopewell is a geographic parish in eastern Albert County, New Brunswick, Canada. (Note: The Territorial Division Act divides the province into 152 parishes, the cities of Saint John and Fredericton, and one town of Grand Falls. The Interpretation Act clarifies that parishes include any local government within their borders.)

For governance purposes, most of the parish is part of the village of Fundy Albert, with the northwestern corner part of the Southeast rural district.

Prior to the 2023 governance reform, the parish was divided between the village of Riverside-Albert and the local service district of the parish of Hopewell.

== History ==
Hopewell parish originates in a 1765 one-hundred-thousand acre Cumberland County township grant within the British Colony of Nova Scotia, following "Le Grand Dérangement". The proprietors of the township may have named it for Hopewell, Pennsylvania, possibly the home of some of the settlers of the township.

The bounds of the township grant were described as follows, "To begin due west form [sic] the point of land lying between the Memramcook and Petitcodiac on the west side of the Petitcodiac River and to extend from form [sic] thence west twenty miles and from thence south to the seacoast on the Channel of Chignecto…excepting the lands lying within the said limits excepting 200 acres of land granted to John Burbridge Esq."

Hopewell was erected as a parish in Westmorland County in 1786 when the province created its own system of counties and civil parishes. Unlike the rest of the province, Westmorland County's parishes did not have their boundaries explicitly described, instead stating only "to be bounded as in and by the several letters patent or grants of the said towns, under the great seal of the province of Nova Scotia". (Note: Uses of long s changed to modern form for readability.)

== Boundaries ==
Hopewell Parish is bounded:

- on the north by the northern line of a grant to Robert Dixon and Jesse Converse on Shepody Bay and its prolongation inland to a point about 1.35 kilometres north of Lumsden Road, where Elgin, Harvey, Hillsborough and Hopewell Parishes meet;
- on the east and southeast by Shepody Bay;
- on the south by Shepody Bay and the Shepody River;
- on the west by a line running up Crooked Creek to the site of a former bridge across the creek, near the end of Mill Road in Riverside-Albert, then running north 22º west (Note: By the magnet of 1838, when declination in the area was between 18º and 19º west of north. The Territorial Division Act clause referring to magnetic direction bearings was later changed to the problematic wording "by the magnet of the year in which the County or Parish was erected", which ignores lines changed after the erection of the county or parish, before being omitted in the 1952 and 1973 Revised Statutes.) to the northern line.

=== Evolution of boundaries ===
The original parish boundaries included Harvey Parish and parts of Alma and Elgin Parishes.

In 1837 the county line between Saint John and Westmorland Counties shifted westward and the orphaned part of Saint John County was added to Hopewell. The next year the western part of Hopewell was included in the newly erected Harvey Parish.

In 1850 a consolidation of the legislation and amendments divinding the province into counties and parishes removed references to the pre-Loyalist townships from the boundaries of Albert County parishes.

== Municipality ==
Riverside-Albert is located in the southwestern corner of the parish, along the Shepody River between the mouths of Crooked Brook and Chapman Creek.

== Local service district ==
The local service district of the parish of Hopewell contained all of the parish outside Riverside-Albert.

The LSD was established on 23 November 1966 to assess for fire protection following the abolition of county councils by the new Municipalities Act. First aid & ambulance services were added on 21 January 1976.

In 2020, the LSD assesses for community & recreation services in addition to the basic LSD services of fire protection, police services, land use planning, emergency measures, and dog control. The taxing authority was 616.00 Hopewell.

== Communities ==
Communities at least partly within the parish. bold indicates an incorporated municipality; italics indicate a name no longer in official use

- Cape Station
- Chemical Road
- Chester
- Curryville
- Demoiselle Creek
- Hopewell Cape
- Hopewell Hill
- Lower Cape
- McGinley's Corner
- Memel Settlement
- Mountville
- **Riverside-Albert**
- Shepody

== Bodies of water ==
Bodies of water (Note: Not including brooks, ponds or coves.) at least partly within the parish.

- Petitcodiac River
- Shepody River
- Crooked Creek
- at least nine other named creeks
- Shepody Bay

== Other notable places ==
Parks, historic sites, and other noteworthy places at least partly within the parish.

- Hopewell Rocks Provincial Park

== Demographics ==
Parish population total does not include Riverside-Albert

=== Population ===
Historical population
Year	Pop.	±%
1991	798	—
1996	812	+1.8%
2001	786	−3.2%
2006	798	+1.5%
2011	643	−19.4%
2016	647	+0.6%

=== Language ===
Mother tongue (2016)

Language	Population	Pct (%)
English only	610	94.6%
French only	15	2.3%
Both English and French	5	0.8%
Other languages	15	2.3%

== Access Routes ==
Highways and numbered routes that run through the parish, including external routes that start or finish at the parish limits:

- **Highways**
  - Route 114
- **Principal Routes**
  - None
- Secondary Routes:
- External Routes:
  - None

== See also ==
- List of parishes in New Brunswick
