= Chocolate River =

Chocolate River may refer to:

- Chocolate River, an alternate name for the Petitcodiac River
- Chocolate River Conservatory of Music
- Chocolate River, a fictional river of Wonka's Chocolate Factory in Charlie and the Chocolate Factory
