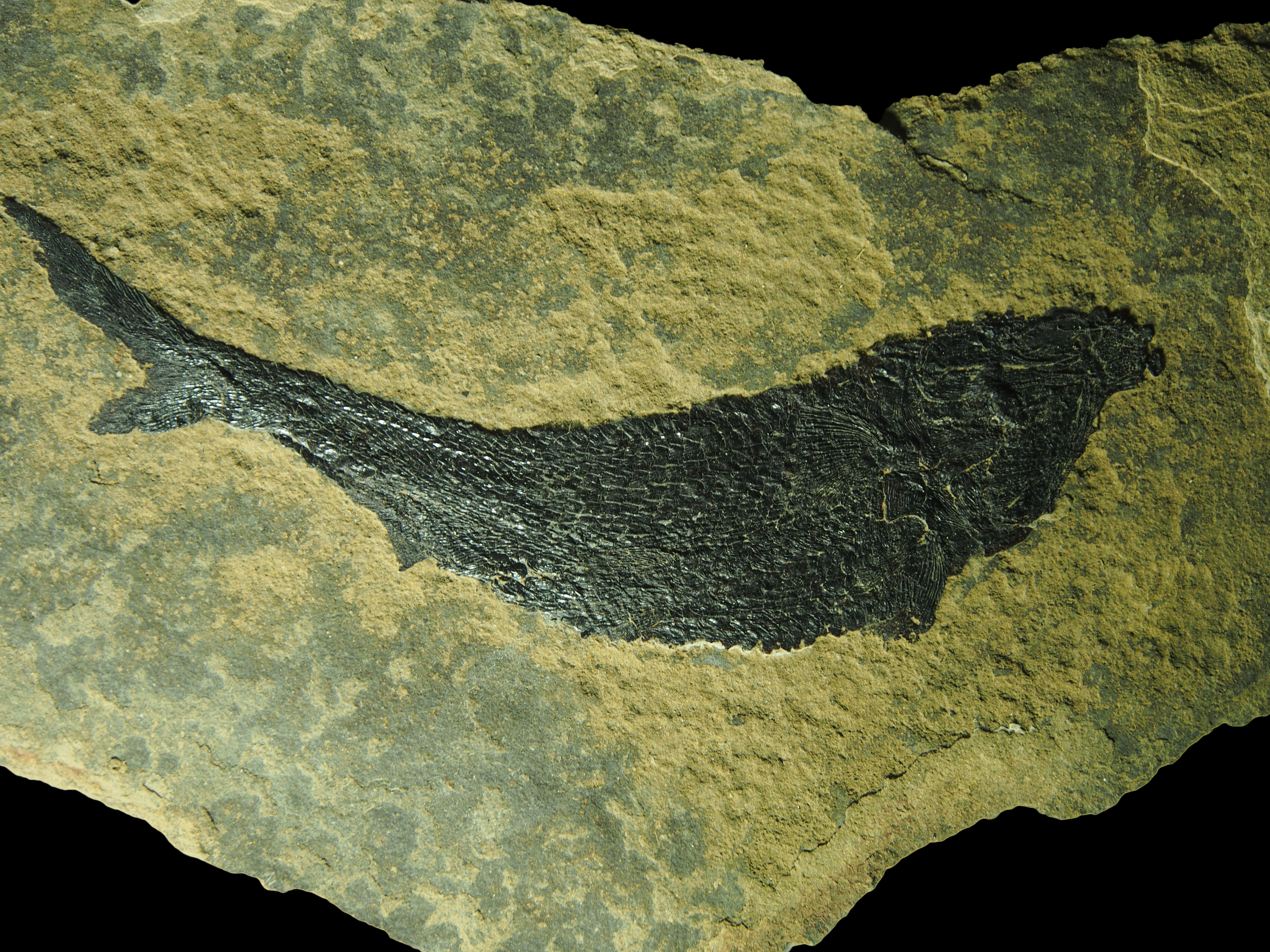
- Rhadinichthys alberti fossil from the Carboniferous of Hillsborough, Canada
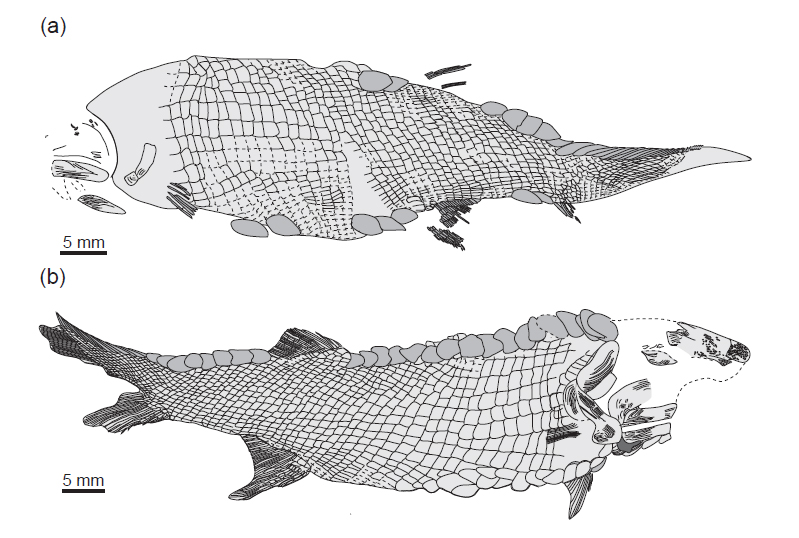
- Drawing of two fossils of R. alberti

Scientific classification
- Kingdom: Animalia
- Phylum: Chordata
- Class: Actinopterygii
- Family: †Rhadinichthyidae
- Genus: †Rhadinichthys; Traquair, 1877

Type species
- †Palaeoniscus ornatissimus Agassiz, 1835

= Rhadinichthys =

Rhadinichthys Temporal range: Late Devonian–Artinskian

Extinct genus of fishes

Rhadinichthys is an extinct genus of prehistoric bony fish. It is known from several species that lived in the Late Devonian epoch, the Carboniferous period and the Cisuralian epoch (early Permian) in what is now Europe, South Africa, and North and South America. Some isolated scales from the Cisuralian of Europe (Belgium, France, Russia) were also referred to this genus.

Rhadinichthys belongs to the family Rhadinichthyidae together with Cycloptychius, Cyranorhis, Mentzichthys and Wendyichthys.

== Species ==
The following species are referred to the genus Rhadinichthys.

- †R. ornatissimus (Agassiz, 1835) (type species) [R. lepturus Traquair, 1877]
- †R. alberti (Jackson, 1851)
- †R. argentinicus Tornquist, 1904
- †R. brevis Traquair, 1877
- †R. canobiensis Traquair, 1909 [R. geikei Traquair, 1881; R. delicatulus Traquair, 1881; R. elegantulus Traquair, 1890]
- †R. carinatus (Agassiz, 1835) [R. tenuicauda Traquair, 1877]
- †R. ferox Traquair, 1877
- †R. formosus Traquair, 1904
- †R. glabrolepis Elliott, 2018
- †R. grossarti Traquair, 1878
- †R. hancocki (Atthey, 1875)
- †R. hibernicus Traquair, 1911
- †R. laevis Traquair, 1911
- †R. macconochii Traquair, 1881
- †R. macrodon Traquair, 1877
- †R. monensis (Egerton, 1850)
- †R.? ornatocephalum Elliott, 2018
- †R.? plumosum Elliott, 2018
- †R.? rioniger Beltan, 1977
- †R. silvensis Yankevich, 1998
- †R. tuberculatus Traquair, 1881
- †R. wardi (Young, 1875)

== Synonyms ==
The following species of Rhadinichthys were subsequently referred to other genera.

- Rhadinichthys modulus Dawson, 1877 → Canobius
- Rhadinichthys deani Eastman, 1908 → Kentuckia
- Rhadinichthys fusiformis Traquair, 1881 → Mesopoma
- Rhadinichthys devonicus Clarke, 1885 → Moythomasia
- Rhadinichthys reticulatus Williams, 1886 → Moythomasia
- Rhadinichthys planti Traquair, 1886 → Trawdenia

== See also ==
- Prehistoric fish
- List of prehistoric bony fish
