= Cherry Island (New Brunswick) =

Island in New Brunswick, Canada

Native name: Misik Negusis (little island of trees)
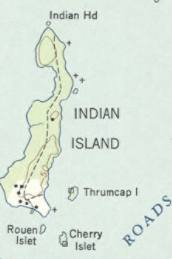
- Interactive map of Cherry Island

Geography
- Location: Bay of Fundy
- Coordinates: 44°55′09″N 66°58′02″W
- Highest elevation: 16 m (52 ft)

Administration
- Canada
- Province: New Brunswick
- County: Charlotte

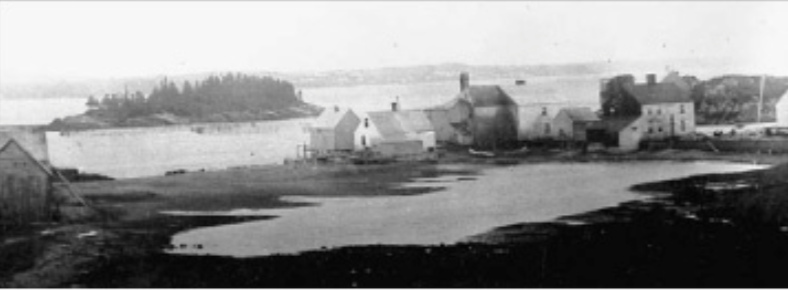
A pre-1900 photograph from Indian Island, showing Cherry Island on the left and Marble Island on the right; the white house in the centre is the Moses Residence.

Cherry Island (also called Cherry Islet) is located off the southern coast of Indian Island, between the larger Campobello Island and Deer Island in Charlotte County, New Brunswick, Canada.

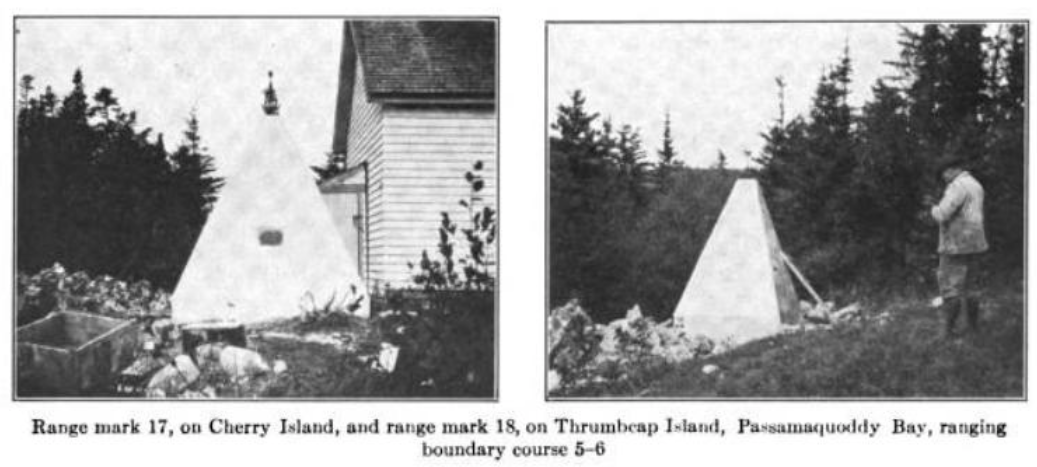
Geodetic trig points were installed on Cherry and Jouett's Islands by the International Border Commission.

There is a geodetic triangulation station on the southwest point of the island, a bronze disc set in a drilled hole in rock.

The island was granted to D. Campbell in 1806. It was one of five islands dismissed by author Abraham Gesner in 1847 as "small eminences of little importance".

In 1903, a fog-bell was added to the island, and Harvey V. Chaffey, descended from the original inhabitant of Indian Island, lived on Cherry Island to care for it until 1914, when Mendle Fountain, descended from the second inhabitant of Indian Island, moved his family to Cherry Island to care for the station until his death in June 1915. In 1916 a new fogbell was added, and additions to the dwelling. In 1914, a proper 8 metre light station was constructed adjacent to the fog-bell.

In 1969, a red-and-white-banded lighthouse station was built to supplement the fog-bell which sounds every 30 seconds. Two outbuildings of the lighthouse were maintained on the island until the 21st century, when they were demolished by the Government of Canada.

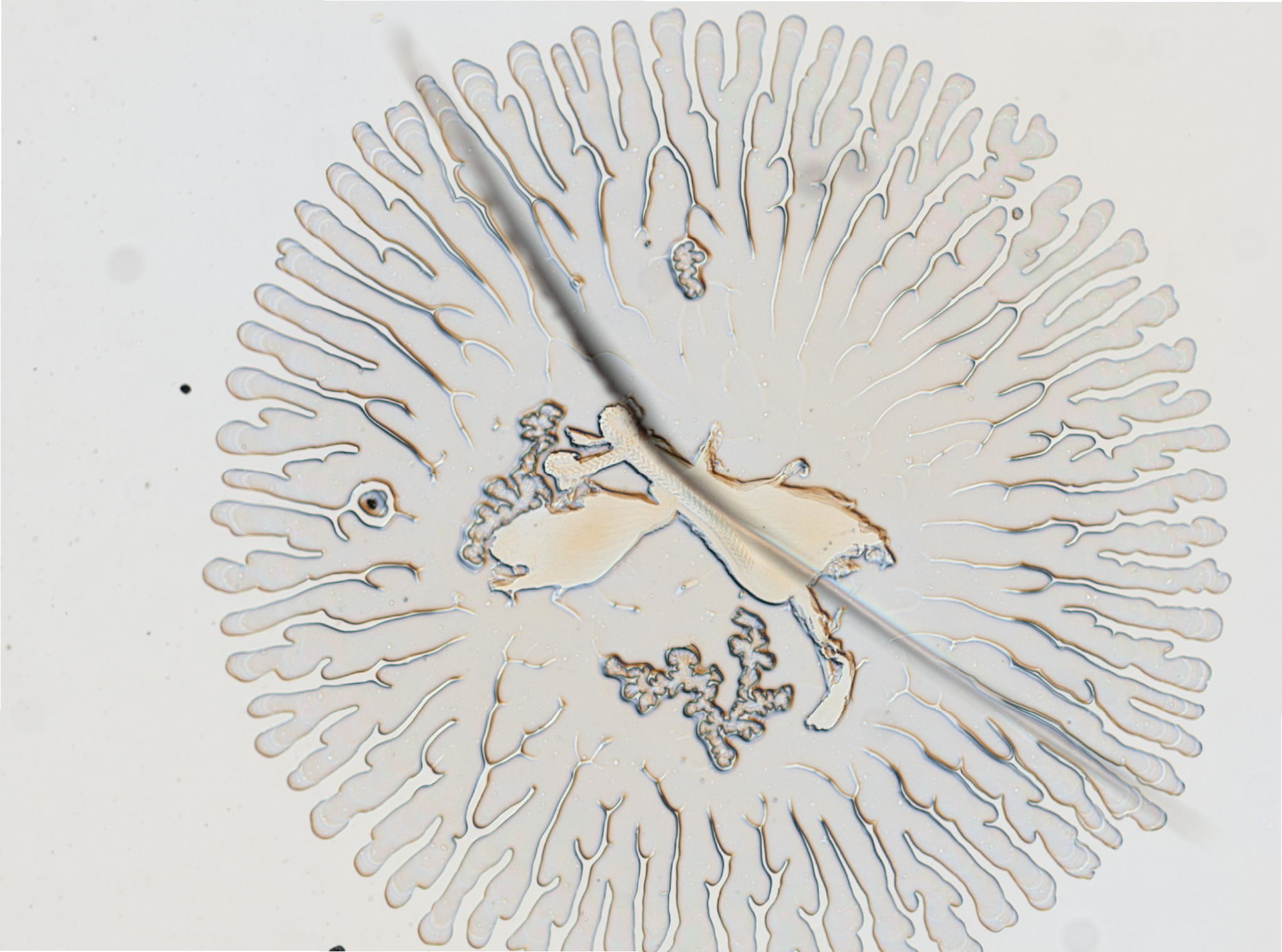
A Doto formosa sea slug collected on Cherry Island in 1875
