= Coat of arms of Moncton =

The coat of arms of Moncton is the municipal symbol of Moncton, New Brunswick, Canada. It is on the city's flag, as well.

== Design ==
=== Supporters ===
The supporters of this coat of arms are: a blacksmith on the left, and a farmer on the right.

=== Shield ===
The shield consists of: a beehive and wheat on the upper half, a locomotive on the lower left, and the Petitcodiac tidal bore on the lower right.

=== Motto ===
The motto Resurgo means I rise again.
