= Memramcook River =

Watercourse in Canada

Coordinates: 45.867°N 64.552°W

The Memramcook River is a river located in Westmorland County, in southeastern New Brunswick, eastern Canada.

== Geography ==
Its meander length is approximately 50 km (31 mi), of which approximately 20 km (12 mi) is a tidal estuary to its discharge point into the Petitcodiac River.

== See also ==
- Memramcook, New Brunswick
- Petitcodiac Riverkeeper
- Shepody Bay
- Bay of Fundy
