= Curryville, New Brunswick =

Coordinates: 45°50′6.3″N 64°37′59″W

Curryville is a Canadian community near the eastern edge of Albert County, New Brunswick, Canada. Situated along the Albert Mines Road and its intersections with Chemical Road and Grub Road, the village is bordered by Demoiselle Creek in the north and Cape Station in the south. Population is approximately 110 of 798 residents in Hopewell Parish. Prominent buildings include the former Curryville United Church and a former community hall, now a ceramic arts studio. Other features include various abandoned pits and quarries (gravel and sandstone) and remnants of the now dismantled Albert Railway (1877 to 1955).

== See also ==
- List of communities in New Brunswick
