= Sentinelles Petitcodiac Riverkeeper =

Canadian ecological non-profit organization

Sentinelles Petitcodiac Riverkeeper (SPR) is a registered non-profit organization and Riverkeeper group established in Three Rivers, New Brunswick, Canada, on 18 February 1999. The group's mission is to lead the restoration, protection and promotion of the ecological integrity of the Petitcodiac River and Memramcook River−Memramcook area watersheds, and the Shepody Bay estuary, all located in southeastern New Brunswick.

== Achievements ==
The SPR's efforts have contributed to the construction of a causeway bridge crossing the Petitcodiac River between Moncton and Riverview. According to the SPR's executive director, the construction of the bridge has restored the river's natural flow.
