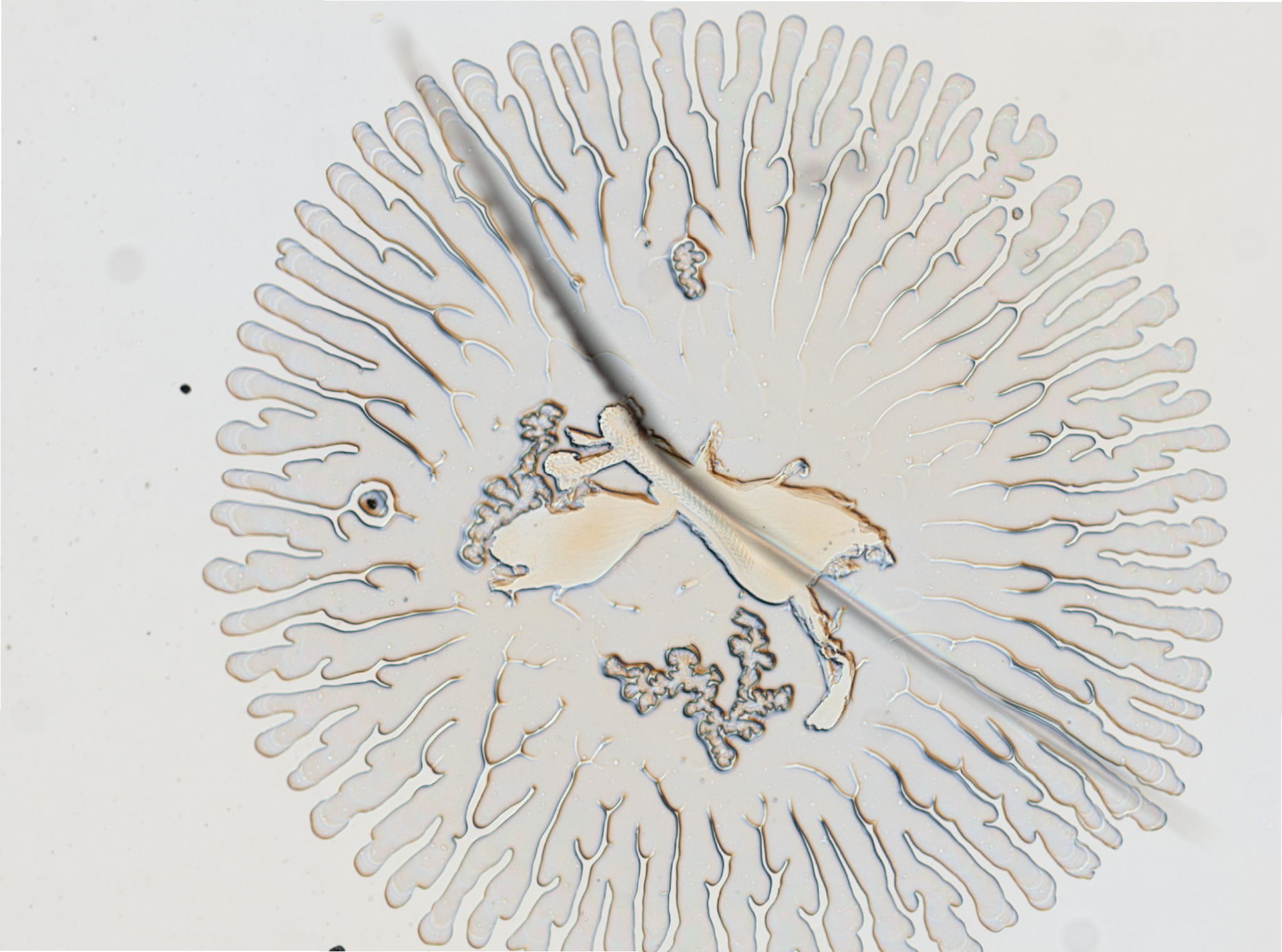
- Doto Formosa collected on Cherry Island, New Brunswick in 1875.

Scientific classification
- Kingdom: Animalia
- Phylum: Mollusca
- Class: Gastropoda
- Order: Nudibranchia
- Suborder: Dendronotacea
- Family: Dotidae
- Genus: Doto
- Species: D. formosa

Binomial name
- Doto formosa Verrill, 1875

= Doto formosa =

Species of gastropod

Doto formosa is a species of sea slug, a nudibranch, a marine gastropod mollusc in the family Dotidae.

== Distribution ==
This species was first described from Rhode Island, United States.

== Description ==
This nudibranch is pale brown with no markings.

== Ecology ==
Doto formosa feeds on hydroids.
