= Chocolate River Conservatory of Music =

Coordinates: 46°05′40″N 64°44′55″W

The Chocolate River Conservatory of Music (French: Conservatoire de musique Chocolate River) is a community oriented teaching facility focused in music. It is located in Dieppe, New Brunswick, Canada and resides in newly constructed (2005) building located in the thriving downtown area of the city. The facility offers programs in music theater, piano, percussion, string instruments, voice, and wind instruments. It is named after the Petitcodiac River, which is also locally known as the Chocolate River. The Chocolate River Music Conservatory closed in June 2008.
