= Albert Mines, New Brunswick =

Human settlement in New Brunswick, Canada

Coordinates: 45.877889°N 64.6685°W

Location of Albert Mines in New Brunswick

Albert Mines is a community in the southeastern corner (Map) of the province of New Brunswick, Canada. It is due south of the Village of Hillsborough and bordered by the communities of Demoiselle Creek (site of Hopewell Rocks) and Edgetts Landing. Prominent buildings today include the Albert Mines Baptist Church. The locale is notable in the history of the petroleum industry as being the source of the first ore used to distill kerosene. (Note: Technically, it was a mixture of Albertite and pitch that was used in the first public demonstration in 1846.)

== Mining history ==
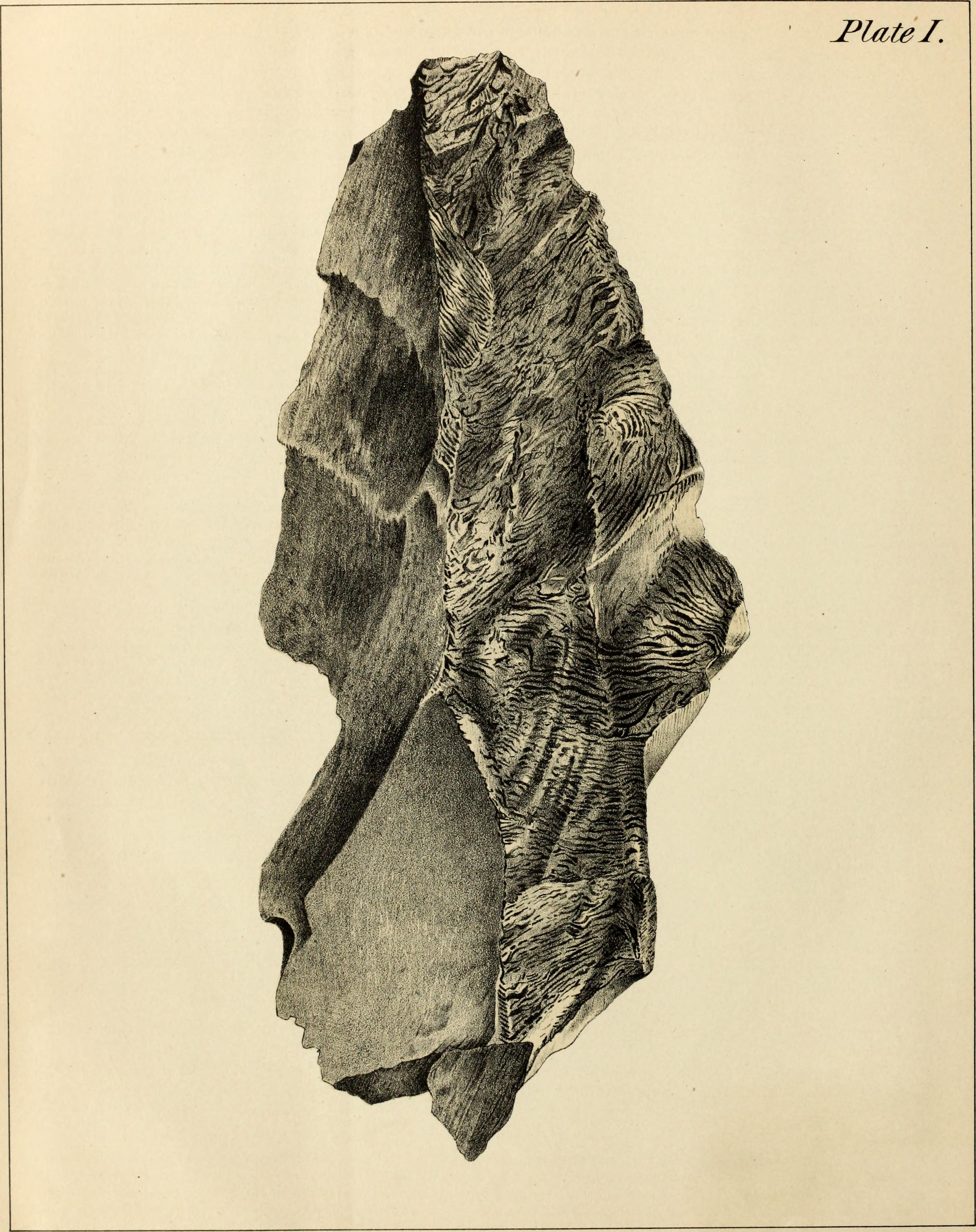
Drawing of the asphalt-like ore known as Albertite.

In 1820, a deposit of Albertite, variously described as "solid petroleum" or "asphalt" was discovered by Abraham Gesner, who understood its potential as an alternative to whale oil as a source of light. After developing a process to distill the ore into what he would call kerosene (paraffin in Europe) the ore was mined between 1854 and 1881, yielding an estimated 200,000 tons of Albertite. Mining disputes, including the nature of Albertite, were subject to legal action in the 1850s. A section of the Albert Railway ran through the area beginning 1877 until the track was dismantled in 1955

A century-old gypsum quarry supplied a National Gypsum mill in nearby Hillsborough and ceased production in the 1980s when the mill closed.

== See also ==
- Royal eponyms in Canada
