= Kentuckia =

Kentuckia Temporal range: Early Carboniferous (Tournaisian)

Scientific classification
- Kingdom: Animalia
- Phylum: Chordata
- Class: Actinopterygii
- Family: †Kentuckiidae; Gardiner, 1993
- Genus: †Kentuckia; Rayner, 1951
- Species: †K. deani

Binomial name
- †Kentuckia deani (Eastman, 1908)

Synonyms
- Rhadinichthys deani Eastman, 1908

Extinct genus of fishes

Kentuckia is an extinct genus of prehistoric marine "palaeoniscoid" ray-finned fish from the Early Carboniferous (Tournaisian) of North America. It contains a single species, K. deani from the Stockdale Formation of Kentucky, US. It is the only known genus in the family Kentuckiidae. It was initially described as a species of Rhadinichthys in 1907, until it was redescribed in its own genus in 1951. Another Devonian species, K. hlavini Dunkle, 1964 from the Famennian-aged Cleveland Shale of Ohio, is now no longer thought to belong to this genus.

Fossils of Kentuckia are abundant at one locality, with multiple specimens preserved in phosphate nodules. Although none of these nodules preserves a complete fish on its own, the partial fish preserved in these nodules are exceptionally well-preserved down to the soft tissues of the head, and allow for an approximate reconstruction of the fish's body plan and a detailed reconstruction of the internal anatomy of its neurocranium.

Due to the uncrushed, three-dimensionally-preserved skulls in the nodules, it is one of the earliest ray-finned fish with properly known dermal bones and neurocrania. This has allowed for an endocast of the fish's brain and associated soft tissues to be reconstructed, which found closer anatomical similarities between the brain of Kentuckia and later ray-finned fish than with earlier fish.

Some studies have found it to form a distinct clade with two other early ray-finned fish, Limnomis from the Late Carboniferous of Pennsylvania, US and Cuneognathus from the Late Devonian of Greenland.

== See also ==
- Prehistoric fish
- List of prehistoric bony fish
