= Demoiselle Creek, New Brunswick =

Community in New Brunswick, Canada

Coordinates: 45°51′17.2″N 64°39′15.6″W

Demoiselle Creek is a Canadian rural community in Albert County, New Brunswick.

Located in Hillsborough Parish (source), the community derives its name from the creek that runs through it. With approximately 50 residents, the community is bordered by the communities of Curryville and Albert Mines. The cave known as the "Underground Lake" is also located in this community. The cave is 141 m long and 13.1 m deep.

== History ==
The community was originally called Cape Demoiselle (or one of about 6 variations of the name "Demoiselle") and now covers an area of approximately 4 square miles (10 km^{2}). The actual geographic feature known as Cape Demoiselle was renamed Hopewell Cape.

The name "Demoiselle" means "little girl" in French. It was named by a ship captain for a rock formation that resembled a young woman's figure. Like many rural communities, Demoiselle is small and sparsely populated.

== See also ==
- List of communities in New Brunswick
