= Sackville, Nova Scotia =

Sackville can refer to several different communities in the Canadian province of Nova Scotia located along the Sackville River. No community has simply "Sackville" as an official name.

- Lower Sackville
- Middle Sackville
- Upper Sackville
