= Albertite =

Variety of asphalt

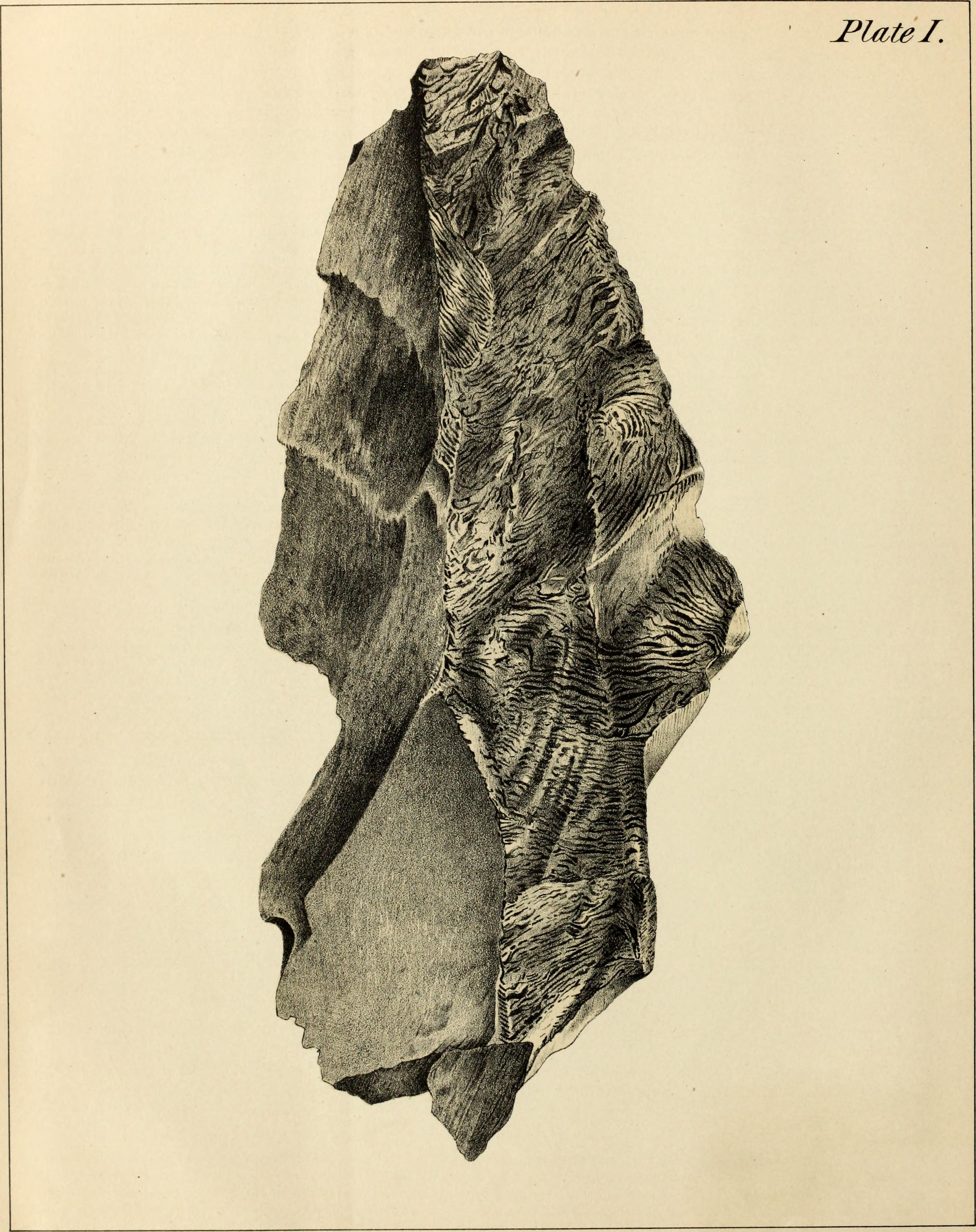
Drawing of the asphalt-like ore known as albertite

Albertite is a variety of asphalt found in the Albert Formation in Albert County, New Brunswick, and in a deposit at Dingwall, in the north-east of Scotland. It is a type of solid hydrocarbon.

Albertite has a black colour, a resinous luster, and a hardness of 2½. It is less soluble in turpentine than the usual type of asphalt. It was from a mixture of albertite and pitch that kerosene was first distilled in 1846 by Abraham Gesner, a New Brunswick geologist who had heard stories of rocks that burned in the area and gave the material its first scientific study.

== Origin ==
Albertite is formed from oil shale in which some of the hydrocarbons have been remobilised as liquid asphalt. The process is as follows:

- Crude oil (petroleum) is produced from source rocks (in the case of Albert Mines, oil shale).
- The petroleum migrates through fractures and becomes trapped in the apex of an anticline.
- The lighter oils gradually leak out through the weakly permeable caprock.
- The bituminous residues (tars, asphaltanes, etc.) are left behind in the fractures as albertite.

== Occurrence ==
Albertite is named after Albert County in New Brunswick, Canada, where it was first found in the area that became known as Albert Mines. There, the albertite occurs as discordant, cross-cutting veins in the core of an anticline. It was initially mistaken for coal. Most geologists of the 1800s were puzzled by how this "coal" came to be discordant to the local strata, as they did not understand the nature of its oil shale source rock, or the fact that the albertite was essentially solidified asphaltum.

Extraterrestrial albertite has also been detected on the dwarf planet Ceres.
