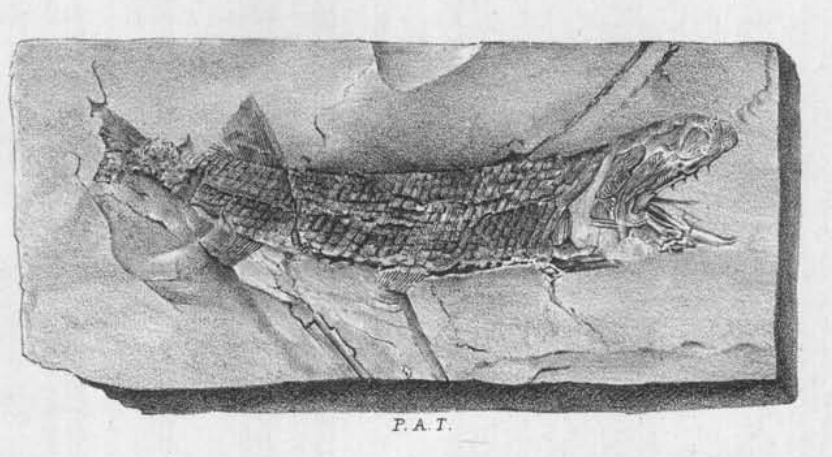
- Specimen of C. carbonarius

Scientific classification
- Kingdom: Animalia
- Phylum: Chordata
- Class: Actinopterygii
- Family: †Rhadinichthyidae
- Genus: †Cycloptychius; Young, 1866

Species
- †C. bidens Matveeva, 1958; †C. carbonarius Young, 1866; †C. concentricus Traquair, 1881; ?†C. loocki Evans, 2005

= Cycloptychius =

Cycloptychius Temporal range: Tournaisian–Moscovian Possible Artinskian occurrence

Extinct genus of fishes

Cycloptychius is an extinct genus of prehistoric freshwater & marine ray-finned fish that existed throughout much of the Carboniferous period in Eurasia, and possibly into the Early Permian in South Africa. It was a member of the Rhadinichthyidae, a family of basal ray-finned fish that was formerly placed in the now-paraphyletic order Palaeonisciformes.

It contains the following species:

- †C. bidens Matveeva, 1958 - Early Carboniferous (Tournaisian) of Krasnoyarsk Krai, Russia (Os’kin Formation)
- †C. carbonarius Young, 1866 - Late Carboniferous (Moscovian) of England (North Staffordshire Coalfield)
- †C. concentricus Traquair, 1881 - Early Carboniferous (Viséan) of Scotland (Glencartholm Volcanic Beds)
- ?†C. loocki Evans, 2005 - Early Permian (Artinskian) of South Africa (Whitehill Formation)

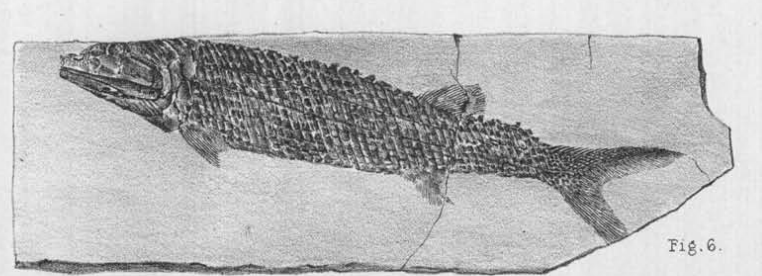
Specimen of C. concentricus

== See also ==
- Prehistoric fish
- List of prehistoric bony fish
