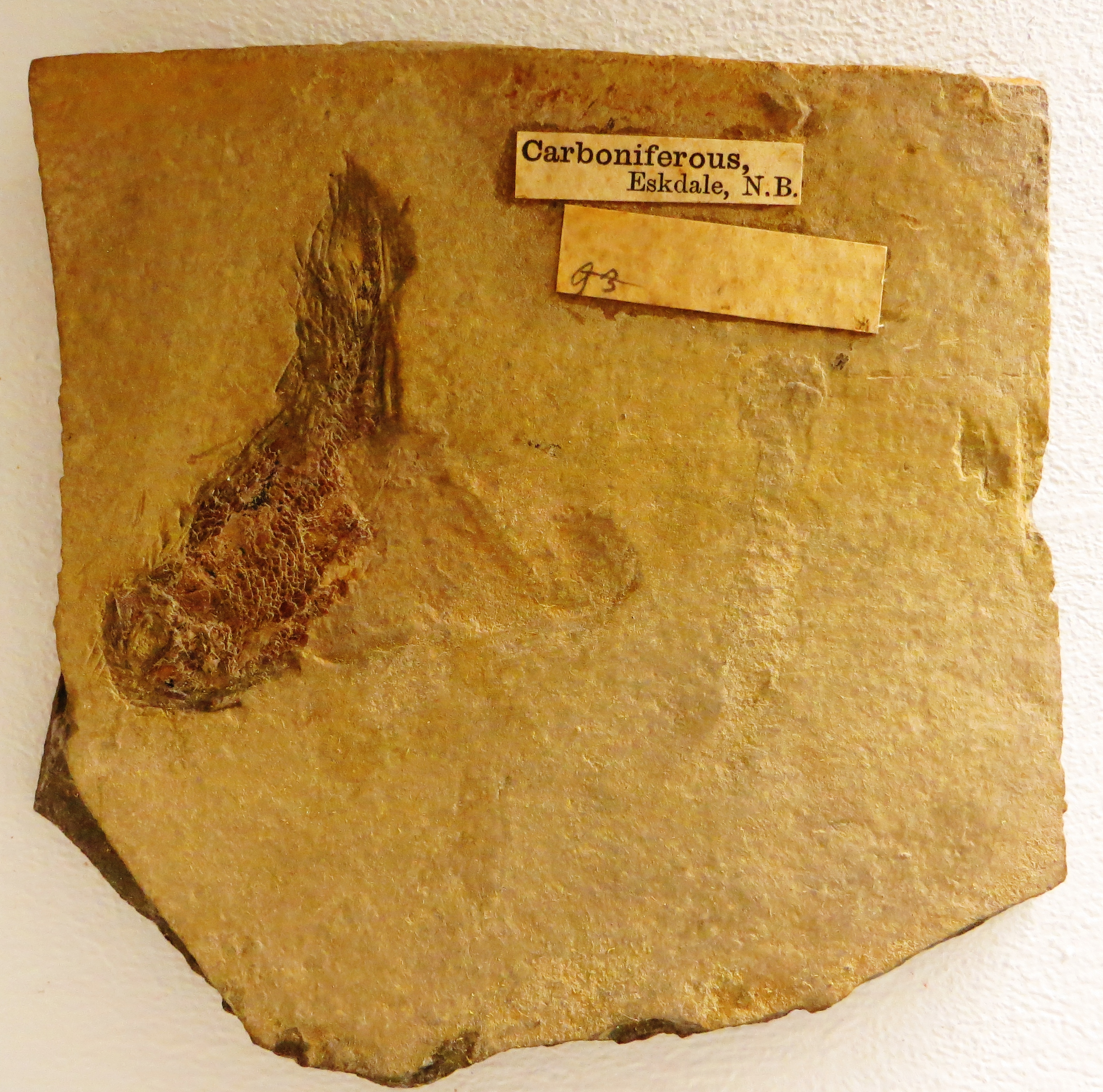

Scientific classification
- Kingdom: Animalia
- Phylum: Chordata
- Class: Actinopterygii
- Family: †Canobiidae
- Genus: †Canobius; Traquair, 1881

Species
- †C. elegantulus Traquair, 1881; †C. ramsayi Traquair, 1881

= Canobius =

Canobius Temporal range: Mississippian

Extinct genus of ray-finned fishes

Canobius (named for Canobie, the district where it was discovered) is an extinct genus of marine ray-finned fish that lived in the early Carboniferous period (Viséan) of Glencartholm, Scotland.

Two species are known from fossil specimens:

- †C. elegantulus Traquair, 1881
- †C. ramsayi Traquair, 1881

Potential indeterminate remains are known from the Tournaisian of Newfoundland and Labrador, Canada. Many other species were previously referred to this genus, but have since been reclassified.

Canobius was a small fish, 7 centimetres (3 in) in length. Compared with its earlier relatives, it had specialized jawbones and hyomandibulars which attached the upper jaw to the braincase, meaning that the jaws were hung vertically under the braincase. This allowed Canobius to open its jaws wider and expand its gill slits further at the same time. In turn, this meant that the fish could take in more oxygen, making it a more active creature. Canobius is presumed to have fed on plankton which is filtered from the water using its small teeth and gills.
