= Abraham Pineo Gesner =

Inventor of kerosene (1797–1864)

Abraham Pineo Gesner ONB
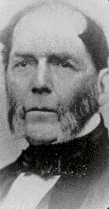
- Born: May 2, 1797; Cornwallis, Nova Scotia
- Died: April 29, 1864 (aged 66); Halifax, Nova Scotia
- Education: Guy's Hospital Medical School; St Bartholomew's Hospital; Dalhousie University
- Known for: Inventing kerosene
- Scientific career
- Fields: Geology, medicine
- Workplaces: Government of New Brunswick; North American Kerosene Gas Light Company

Abraham Pineo Gesner (Note: Pronounced /ˈɡɛsnər/) ONB (May 2, 1797 – April 29, 1864) was a Nova Scotian medical doctor and geologist who invented a process for the production of coal oil, which he called kerosene. Gesner was born in Cornwallis, Nova Scotia (now called Chipmans Corner) and lived much of his life in Saint John, New Brunswick. He died in Halifax, Nova Scotia. He was an influential figure in the development of the study of Canadian geology and natural history.

== Biography ==
=== Early life ===
Abraham Pineo Gesner was born on May 2, 1797, at Chipmans Corner, Cornwallis Township, just north of Kentville, Nova Scotia. He was one of 12 children raised by Henry Gesner and Sarah Pineo. His father was a Loyalist, who emigrated to Nova Scotia after the American Revolution. Gesner was noted to be a great reader and a diligent student.

In his early twenties, Gesner began a venture selling horses to plantations in the Caribbean and the United States, but this enterprise failed after he lost most of his horses in two shipwrecks. Financially drained, Gesner returned to the family farm and married Harriet Webster, daughter of prominent Kentville doctor Isaac Webster in 1824. Reportedly, Webster offered to take care of Gesner's debts if he would study medicine and secure a steady income for his family. In 1825, Gesner travelled to London to study medicine at St Bartholomew's Hospital under Sir Astley Paston Cooper, and surgery at Guy's Hospital under John Abernethy. While primarily a medical student, Gesner developed an interest in the earth sciences and took lectures in mineralogy and geology. Gesner also established a lifelong relationship with Charles Lyell.

=== Early career ===
Gesner qualified as a doctor of medicine and settled in Parrsboro, Nova Scotia in 1827 as a travelling physician. Gesner also continued to pursue his passion for geology, reading the writings of notable geologists and developing a habit of picking up mineral specimens that caught his attention while making his rounds on horseback. In 1836, Gesner published his first book, Remarks on the Geology and Mineralogy of Nova Scotia. The book expanded on an earlier geological study by Charles T. Jackson and displayed Gesner's ability to express complicated concepts in simple language. Following the publication of Remarks on the Geology and Mineralogy of Nova Scotia, Gesner focused his efforts on studying geology and the sciences connected to it.

In 1838, the government of New Brunswick appointed Gesner as Provincial Geologist, and he moved to Saint John to conduct a geological survey of the province. For five years, Gesner spent his summers on geological fieldwork and his winters classifying specimens and writing reports. Although Gesner's geological studies were of high quality by the standards of the 1840s, he had no experience in mining and failed to make a realistic appraisal of the province's mineral reserves. Following the publication of Gesner's geological surveys, local entrepreneurs opened coal and iron mines in Queens County and were quickly disappointed by the extent and quality of the ore. Unhappy investors questioned the validity of Gesner's surveys and the provincial government terminated his employment in 1843.

During the first summer of his geological surveys, Gesner found a bituminous substance on the Petitcodiac River in Albert County, which he named albertite to differentiate it from coal or asphalt.

While in Saint John, Gesner amassed an extensive collection of minerals and wildlife specimens, which he assembled into a museum in 1842. Gesner's museum was one of the first of its kind in British North America and had 2173 items in its catalogue. The museum was a financial failure, and when Gesner left New Brunswick, the Saint John Mechanics’ Institute acquired the objects. In 1890, the Natural History Society of New Brunswick took over the collection, which is today a part of the New Brunswick Museum.

Following the termination of his geological appointment in 1843, Gesner returned to his family homestead at Cornwallis, Nova Scotia, in order to be with his father who was then 87 years old. While working on the family farm, Gesner also continued to practice medicine, write books, give public lectures and conduct experiments. He published notes for emigrants to New Brunswick, outlined the industrial resources of Nova Scotia, and built an electrical motor driven by a voltaic battery. In 1846, the government of Nova Scotia appointed Gesner Commissioner of Indian Affairs, and the following year he submitted a report on the living conditions of the Miꞌkmaq population. While visiting Mi'kmaq habitations across the province for his report, Gesner was known to donate his own money to assist impoverished families.

In 1842, looking for coal, Gesner travelled to Quebec, where he discovered the first of the great fossil deposits of the future Miguasha National Park. However, little notice was taken of his report until the fossils were rediscovered in 1879.

=== Discovery of kerosene ===
Gesner likely began experimenting with hydrocarbons in the 1840s. Utilizing a sample of bitumen from Trinidad's Pitch Lake that he collected while shipping horses across the Atlantic, Gesner developed a method of extracting oils and gas from bituminous substances. Gesner found that the first product was not satisfactory as it had an offensive odour, the raw material was expensive to obtain, and his experiments suggested that one ton of Trinidad bitumen would produce only 42 gallons of oil. Switching his experiments from Trinidad's bitumen to albertite, Gesner found that the burning oil extracted from the substance produced a brighter and cleaner flame compared to lamps using whale oil. While undertaking a series of public lectures in Charlottetown, Gesner reportedly gave the first public demonstration of the preparation and use of the new lamp fuel in August 1846. Gesner first called his product "keroselain" from two Greek words, κηρός (wax) and λάδι (oil), but later contracted the name to kerosene.

Shortly after Gesner's father died on October 13, 1850, he moved his family to Sackville, a small town near Halifax, and in 1852 to Halifax. In Halifax, Gesner made the acquaintance of Thomas Cochrane, 10th Earl of Dundonald. The pair planned to set up a company that would illuminate Halifax by using albertite from Albert County, New Brunswick, and bitumen from Trinidad's pitch lake. However, Cochrane's terms of service expired in April 1851, and he returned to England before the pair could bring the project to fruition. Gesner attempted to continue the project on his own, but Halifax's city council awarded the gas license to a rival group, the Halifax Gas Company. Moreover, although Gesner attempted to receive a lease to mine bitumen in Albert County, another entrepreneur, William Cairns, had already purchased the rights to mine coal in the area. After Cairns had Gesner's men forcibly expelled from the site of the bitumen deposit, Gesner brought suit against Cairns for trespassing. The trial centered on whether the albertite deposit was coal or asphalt. The jury, told by the judge that Cairn's license to mine coal included "other mines and minerals," ultimately sided against Gesner, resulting in albertite's misidentification as "Albert Coal" for the next 30 years. In early 1853, following the outcome of the trial, Gesner and his family moved to New York City, where he had earlier exhibited his kerosene and amassed significant publicity.

=== The North American Kerosene Company ===
After arriving in New York, Gesner focused on finding financial backing for his kerosene venture. In March 1853, Gesner partnered with shipbroker Horatio Eagle, who issued an eight-page circular entitled, Project for the Formation of a Company to Work the Combined Patent Rights of Dr. Abraham Gesner, Nova Scotia, and the Right Hon. the Earl of Dundonald of Middlesex, England. The pamphlet offered for sale $100,000 in shares of a new company called the Asphalt Mining and Kerosene Company, later renamed the North American Kerosene Company. The pamphlet outlined the numerous uses for kerosene oils and noted that Gesner was the company's chief chemist, hired on for a "moderate salary." On June 27, 1854, Gesner obtained U.S patents 11,203, 11,204, and 11,205 for "Improvement in kerosene burning fluids," but he transferred patent rights to the North American Kerosene Company. In the patents, Gesner described three distinct types of kerosene, which he labelled kerosenes A, B and C. Kerosene A was the most volatile fraction, known today as gasoline. Kerosene B was slightly less volatile and was intended mainly for mixing with the other grades. Kerosene C was the lamp fuel, which came to be known as "coal-oil" or "carbon-oil."

Under Gesner's guidance, the North American Kerosene Company began constructing a coal oil refinery on a seven-acre tract at Newtown Creek, Long Island, the first of its kind in North America. By 1856, the firm was selling kerosene for use as lamp fuel. According to an article in the New York Commercial Advertiser in August 1859, the plant cost $1.25 million to build, employed 200 men, used 30,000 tons of coal per year, and exported 5,000 gallons of kerosene per day. Modern engineers have praised Gesner's efficient design of the factory, differing very little from manufactories built as late as 1914. While the enterprise had not made Gesner extremely wealthy, he lived comfortably in Brooklyn, New York, where he was a prominent figure in the local church and community.

By the late 1850s, the North American Kerosene Company began to face increased competition as various coal oil competitors entered the scene. In response to the increased competition, the North American Kerosene Company published a pamphlet on March 28, 1859, that advised customers that kerosene is their registered trademark and that oils made by others can not use the name. One prominent rival manufacturer, Samuel Downer of Boston, Massachusetts, made an agreement in early 1859 to license the name and Gesner's refinement process. When James Young, a Scottish chemist, who had independently developed a process of distilling a petroleum fuel into a product he named "paraffin oil," became aware of the North American Kerosene Company's claims, he filed for patent infringement and won. Although Young only began his distillation experiments in 1848, two years after Gesner's first public demonstration of Kerosene, he was first to file an American patent for his process in 1852. Thereafter, the North American Kerosene Company had to pay royalties to Young.

Following the discovery of oil in Enniskillen Township and Pennsylvania, the North American Kerosene Company began using petroleum to produce kerosene instead of coal at about one third the cost. Sometime after the trial, the company replaced Gesner with Luther Atwood as chief chemist. The Newton Creek plant eventually passed into the hands of Charles Pratt and Company, a subsidiary of Standard Oil, and continued to operate until May 1951. In 1952, a junk dealer bought the refinery and sold the equipment for scrap.

=== Marriage and children ===
Gesner married Harriet Webster, daughter of prominent Kentville doctor Isaac Webster in 1824. Together, they had seven sons and three daughters, but three children died in infancy. Three of his sons, Brower (1834–1873), John Frederick (1839–1899), and George Weltden (1829–1904), pursued careers in geology and chemistry.

=== Later life and death ===
For a time, Gesner remained in New York, practising medicine and continuing his research into hydrocarbons. In 1861, Gesner published A Practical Treatise on Coal, Petroleum and Other Distilled Oils, which was extremely influential in the future development of the petroleum industry and remarkable for the accuracy of his predictions on the future course the refining business would take. Gesner was humble about his contribution to the development of the petroleum industry, writing in A Practical Treatise on Coal that "The progress of discovery in this case, as in others, has been slow and gradual. It has been carried on by the labors, not of one mind, but of many, so as to render it difficult to discover to whom the greatest credit is due."

After the publication of A Practical Treatise on Coal, Gesner became a distillation consultant, visiting the oil fields in Enniskillen Township sometime around 1860. Gesner might have helped James Miller Williams in the development of his petroleum refinery in Hamilton in 1861.

In 1863, Gesner returned to Halifax, Nova Scotia, where he was offered the chair of Natural History at Dalhousie University, but he died on April 29, 1864, before he could take up the position. Gesner was buried in an unmarked grave at Halifax's Camp Hill Cemetery.

== Legacy ==
In 1933, Imperial Oil Ltd., then a Standard Oil subsidiary, erected a memorial at Gesner's grave in Camp Hill Cemetery to pay tribute to his contribution to the petroleum industry. The monument reads "His treatise on the geology and mineralogy of Nova Scotia, 1836, was one of the earliest works dealing with those subjects in this province and about 1852 he was the American inventor of the process of kerosene oil. Erected by Imperial Oil Ltd. as a token of appreciation and for his important contribution to the oil industry."

In 2007, Gesner was inducted into the Canadian Petroleum Hall of Fame for his contributions to the petroleum industry and in 2013 he was added to the Nova Scotia Institute for Science's Hall of Fame. In 2016, Gesner was posthumously inducted to the Order of New Brunswick by the province of his longtime residence.

Several streets are named in his honour. The City of Halifax renamed a street at the west end of Fairview between Melrose and Adelaide in honour of Gesner. Formerly a part of Dunbrack Street, the construction of the Dunbrack Street/North West Arm Drive connector during the 1980s prompted the renaming of this segment. In Ottawa, there is a street named for Gesner in the west part of Ottawa's Katimavik-Hazeldean neighbourhood, where the residential streets are named for Canadian inventors. Whether by plan or by coincidence, it dead-ends at an Esso (Imperial Oil) gas station.

Starting in 1998, the Fundy Geological Museum in Parrsboro Nova Scotia, a former residence of Gesner, has awarded an "Abraham Gesner Work Scholarship" to a local student who shows keen interest in the sciences.

In 2000, he was honoured by the placement of his image on a postage stamp by Canada Post.

His birthplace at Chipmans Corner, Nova Scotia was marked by a National Historic Site monument in 1954. In 2019, a large sculptural monument by artist Ruth Abernethy honouring Gesner's work was added to the Chipman Corner birthplace commemoration site.

== Publications ==
- — (1836). Remarks on the geology and mineralogy of Nova Scotia. Halifax. ISBN 9780665353871.
- — (1839). First report on the geological survey of the province of New-Brunswick. Saint John. ISBN 9780665448102.
- — (1840). Second report on the geological survey of the province of New-Brunswick. Saint John. ISBN 9780665448119.
- — (1841). Third report on the geological survey of the province of New-Brunswick. Saint John. ISBN 9780665448126.
- — (1842). Fourth report on the geological survey of the province of New-Brunswick. Saint John. ISBN 9780665448133.
- — (1842). Synopsis of the contents of Gesner's Museum of Natural History, at Saint John, N.B., opened on the fifth day of April, 1842. Saint John.
- — (1843). Report on the geological survey of the province of New Brunswick : with a topographical account of the public lands and the districts explored in 1842. Saint John. ISBN 9780665448140.
- —; John Ross (1846). Report on the Londonderry iron and coal deposits / by Dr. Gesner. And, A prospectus with a view to forming a company to work the same / by the proprietor, John Ross. Saint John. ISBN 9780665349386.
- — (1847). New Brunswick; with Notes for Emigrants: Comprehending the Early History, an ... London: Simmonds & Ward.
- — (1849). The industrial resources of Nova Scotia : comprehending the physical geography, topography, geology, agriculture, fisheries, mines, forests, wild lands, lumbering, manufactories, navigation, commerce, emigration, improvements, industry, contemplated railways, natural history and resources, of the province. Halifax. ISBN 9780665353857.
- — (1850). Prospectus of Dr. Gesner's patent kerosene gas obtained from bitumen, asphaltum, or mineral pitch. New York: Trehern & Williamson. ISBN 9780665515811.
- — (1861). A practical treatise on coal petroleum and other distilled oils. New York: Balliere Brothers. ISBN 9780665477638.
- —; George Weltden Gesner (1865). A practical treatise on coal petroleum and other distilled oils. New York: Balliere Brothers. ISBN 9780665477645.
