= Petitcodiac River =

River in south-eastern New Brunswick, Canada

Petitcodiac River _{Rivière Petitcodiac (French)}
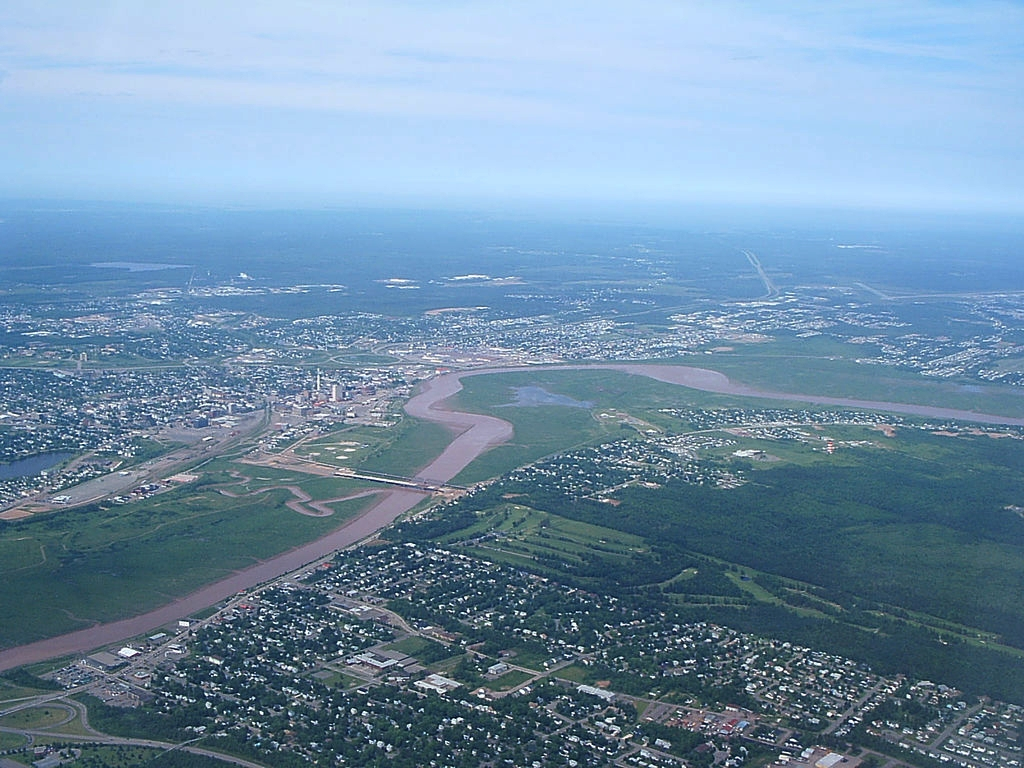
- An aerial view of the bend in the river at Moncton

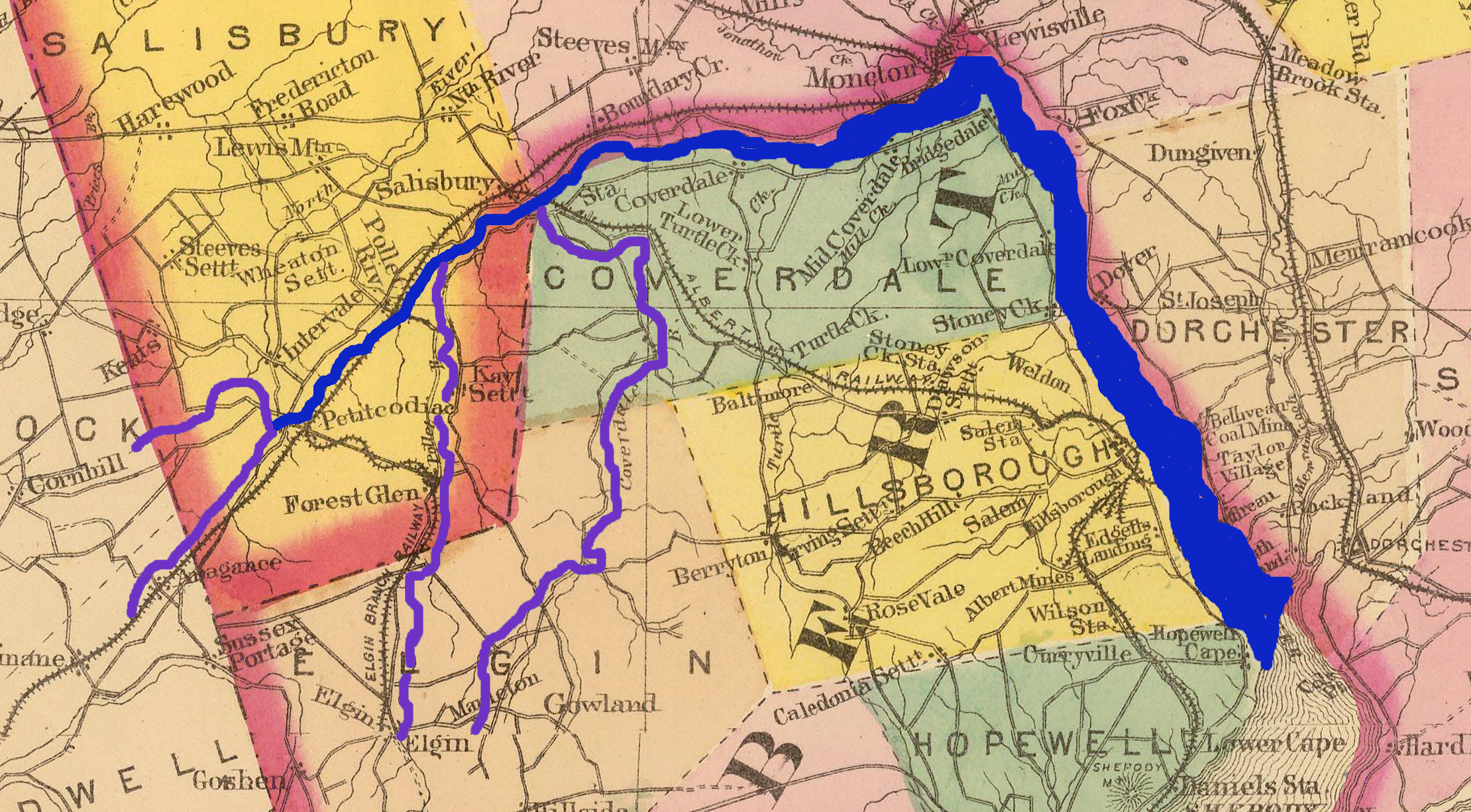
- A map of the Petitcodiac River, highlighted in dark blue. Purple indicates its four major tributaries.
- Etymology: Mi'kmaq language Epetkutogoyek, meaning "the river that bends like a bow"
- Nickname: Chocolate River

Location
- Country: Canada
- Province: New Brunswick
- Counties: Westmorland, Albert, Kings
- Cities: Moncton, Dieppe

Physical characteristics
- Source confluence: Anagance River and North River, Westmorland County, New Brunswick
  - coordinates: 45°55′37″N 65°11′20″W
- Mouth
  - location: Shepody Bay, Albert County, New Brunswick
  - coordinates: 45°51′58″N 64°34′28″W
- Length: 79 km (49 mi)approx.
- Basin size: 2,071 km^{2} (800 sq mi)
- Discharge
  - location: Riverview Causeway
  - average: 27.3 m^{3}/s (960 cu ft/s)
  - minimum: 0.36 m^{3}/s (13 cu ft/s)
  - maximum: 730 m^{3}/s (26,000 cu ft/s)

Basin features
- Tributaries
  - left: North River, Mill Creek, Jonathan Creek, Halls Creek, Fox Creek
  - right: Anagance River, Little River, Pollett River, Turtle Creek, Weldon Creek

The Petitcodiac River (/pɛtiˈkoʊdiæk/) is a river located in south-eastern New Brunswick, Canada. Local tourist businesses often refer to it as the "chocolate river" due to its distinctive brown mud floor and brown waters. Stretching across a meander length of 79 kilometres (49 miles), the river traverses Westmorland, Albert, and Kings counties, draining a watershed area of about 2,071 square kilometres (800 sq mi). The watershed features valleys, ridges, and rolling hills, and is home to a diverse population of terrestrial and aquatic species. Ten named tributaries join the river in its course toward its mouth in Shepody Bay. Prior to the construction of a causeway in 1968, the Petitcodiac River had one of the world's largest tidal bores, which ranged from 1 to 2 metres (3.3–6.6 ft) in height and moved at speeds of 5 to 13 kilometres per hour (3.1–8.1 mph). With the opening of the causeway gates in April 2010, the river is flushing itself of ocean silts, and the bore is returning to its former size.

The Mi'kmaq were the first to settle near the river, who used it as part of a portage route between Shubenacadie and the village of Petitcodiac, where they had a winter camp. In 1698, the region was colonized by Acadians from Port Royal, Nova Scotia; however, they were later expelled in 1755 during the Seven Years' War. During this period, Acadian resistance fighters based in Village-des-Blanchard (now Hillsborough) fought under the command of French leader Charles Deschamps de Boishébert in the Battle of Petitcodiac, attempting to repel British troops but ultimately suffering the destruction of most of their settlement. Three years later, British troops returned to the river and launched the Petitcodiac River Campaign. In the 1840s, the Greater Moncton area experienced a shipbuilding boom, which was halted following the arrival of the steam train, leading to the town's de-incorporation. These changes gradually marginalized the Petitcodiac River.

In 1968, a controversial rock-and-earth fill causeway was constructed between Moncton and Riverview to prevent agricultural flooding and to carry a crossing between the two communities. The causeway caused many problems for the river and its surrounding ecosystem. An estimated 10 million cubic metres (13 million cubic yards) of silt was deposited in the 4.7 km (2.9 mi) of river downstream from the causeway in the first three years following construction. The causeway restricted the movement of fish and reduced the region's salmon catches by 82 percent. Water quality has also dropped thanks to industrial expansion around the area. In 2003, Earthwild International designated the Petitcodiac River as the most endangered river in Canada because of these problems. On 14 April 2010, the causeway's gates were opened permanently as part of a $68 million three-phase project designed to restore the river. The causeway was replaced with a bridge, completed in September 2021.

== Etymology ==
A commonly held belief suggests that the name "Petitcodiac" originates from the French term "petit coude," meaning "little elbow." However, the actual derivation of the name is rooted in an indigenous word, likely from Wolastoqey or possibly Mi'kmaq language. According to Wolastoqey Elder and linguist Dr. Peter Paul of Woodstock Reserve, the name refers to a wall of water rushing in: "now they call that petakuyak. [It] means 'sound of thunder,' well, the rush of water coming in like a thunderstorm." If the term has a Mi'kmaq origin, it could be linked to "Petkootkweăk," meaning "the river that bends like a bow", possibly a reference to the river's right angle bend near Moncton. The Acadians adapted the name to Petcoudiac or Petitcoudiac, which was later modified to Petitcodiac by British settlers.

The river gained the nickname "Chocolate River" due to its heavy sedimentation, resulting in a distinctive brown tint. With the construction of the Petitcodiac River Causeway, an additional 10 million cubic metres (13 million cubic yards) of sediment began to accumulate in the 4.7 km (2.9 mi) stretch downstream from the causeway.

== Geography ==
=== Course ===
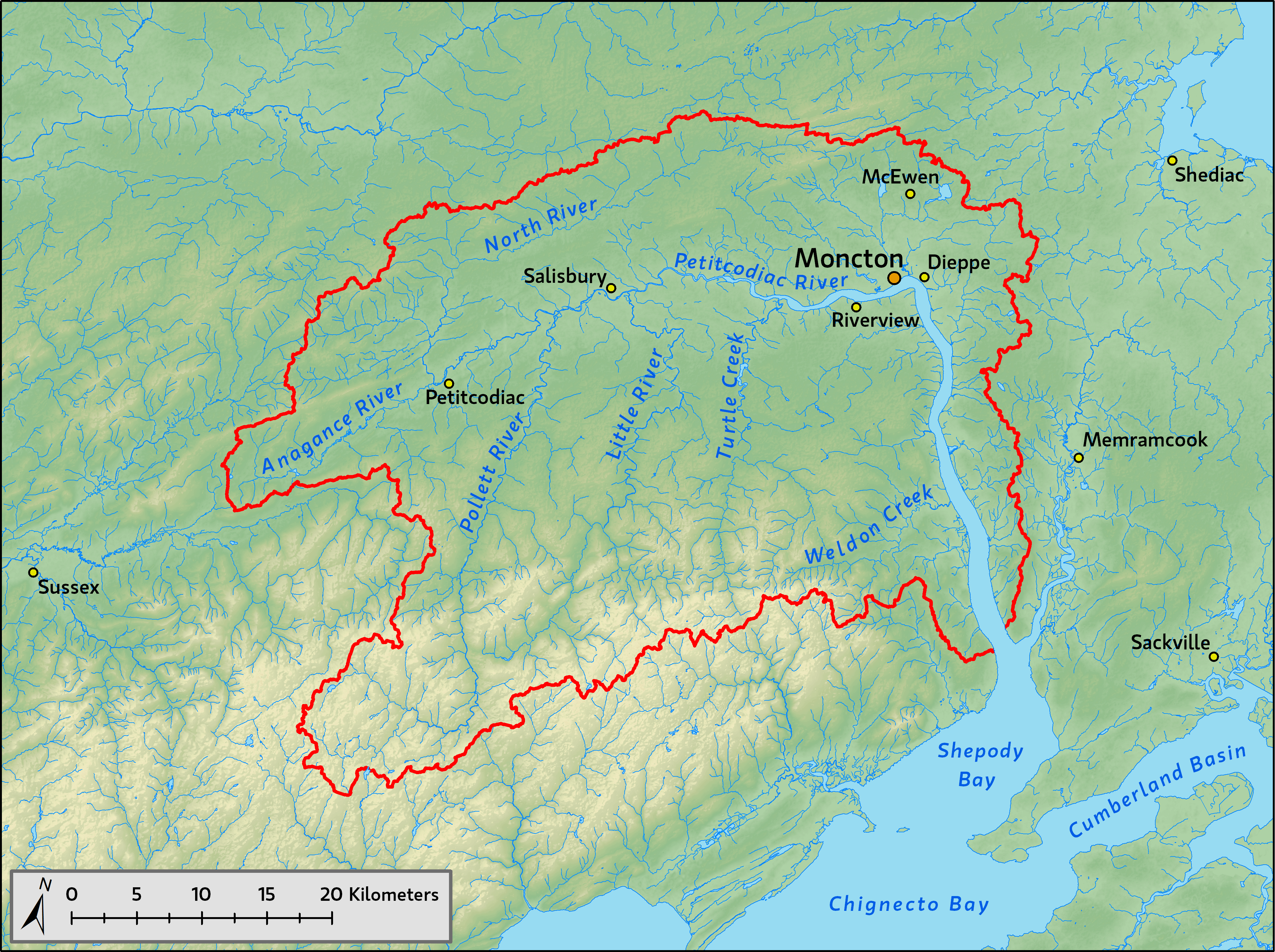
A map of the Petitcodiac River watershed displaying the river and its six largest tributaries.

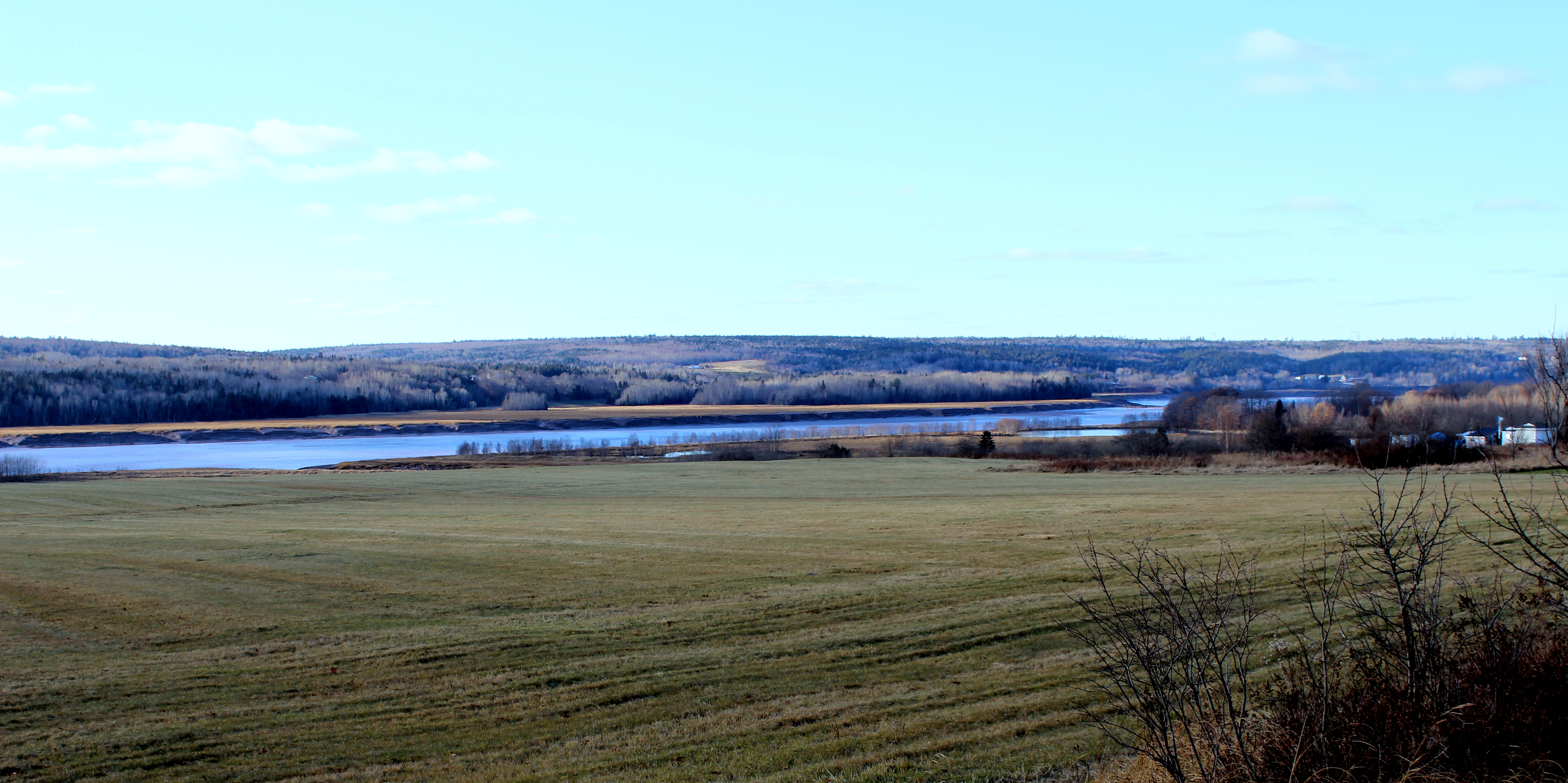
Petitcodiac River, view from New Brunswick Route 925, near Gautreau Village (Memramcook)

The river measures about 79 km (49 mi) from its source near Three Rivers to its mouth at Shepody Bay; its source derives from the confluence of the Anagance and North rivers in western Westmorland County. The Anagance River arises from its tributaries, Hayward Brook and Holmes Brook, and drains 81 km^{2} (31 sq mi) from the south-east of the Petitcodiac River, while the North River drains 264 km^{2} (102 sq mi) from the north. From the confluence, the river passes under the bridge on Route 106 in Petitcodiac; the road then follows the river to Moncton on the left side of the river. Route 1 crosses the river a few kilometres downstream to join Trans-Canada Highway 2. The community of River Glade precedes Petitcodiac River's right tributary, Pollett River, with a watershed of 314 km^{2} (121 sq mi). As the waterway runs past Salisbury, its final major right tributary, Little River (formerly known as Coverdale River), joins it. Little River's watershed is 275 km^{2} (106 sq mi). The river passes Coverdale and is joined by Turtle Creek before widening as it approaches Moncton.

The causeway, built in 1968, formed a wall blocking all but 100 m (330 ft) of water as the river flowed downstream toward the Gunningsville Bridge. Before the causeway's construction, the river's area would expand through Moncton, attaining a width of 1.6 km (one mile). A series of banks to both sides precede the 90-degree turn to the south, a feature that gave Moncton its original name, Le Coude (The Elbow). The river passes Dieppe on its eastern side and Hillsborough on its western side before it approaches its mouth.

The Memramcook River, which has a watershed area of 412 km^{2} (159 sq mi), joins the Petitcodiac River near its mouth. The Petitcodiac River then widens and drains into Shepody Bay, where there is a 122 km^{2} (47 sq mi) wetland. Once past the Hopewell Rocks, Shepody Bay merges with the Cumberland Basin, which runs south-west toward Chignecto Bay. Chignecto Bay drains into the Bay of Fundy, which flows into the Gulf of Maine, which proceeds south-east into the Atlantic Ocean through the Northeast Channel.

=== Watershed ===
The Petitcodiac River watershed is about 2,071 km^{2} (800 sq mi). The average yearly precipitation in the watershed is 1,100 millimetres (43 in), with average temperatures of 17.5 °C (63.5 °F) in the summer and −7.5 °C (18.5 °F) in the winter. The watershed is located in the Kings, Westmorland, and Albert counties in south-east New Brunswick, with some of it crossing into the Caledonian Highlands to the south-east. It borders the Bay of Fundy and three other designated watersheds in the province: the lower Saint John River to the north-west, the Shediac Bay to the north-east, and the Kennebecasis River to the south. Although the Petitcodiac River's watershed is geographically distinct from that of the nearby Memramcook River, some groups merge the two for categorisation purposes.

The area has been occupied by Europeans since the late 17th century. Moncton's population has grown rapidly since the 19th century, rising from fewer than 100 people in 1825, to over 15,000 people in 1917, and to 126,000 people in 2006. In spite of this growth, most of the area remains relatively undisturbed: 80 percent of the watershed is covered with forest, a tenth is used for agriculture and three percent is occupied by wetlands. Only four percent of the area is used for commercial, residential, or private usage. Nevertheless, the Petitcodiac Watershed Monitoring Group noted in 2001 that this growth is one of the main factors for the ongoing "environmental degradation" of the river.

== Hydrology ==
=== Water quality ===
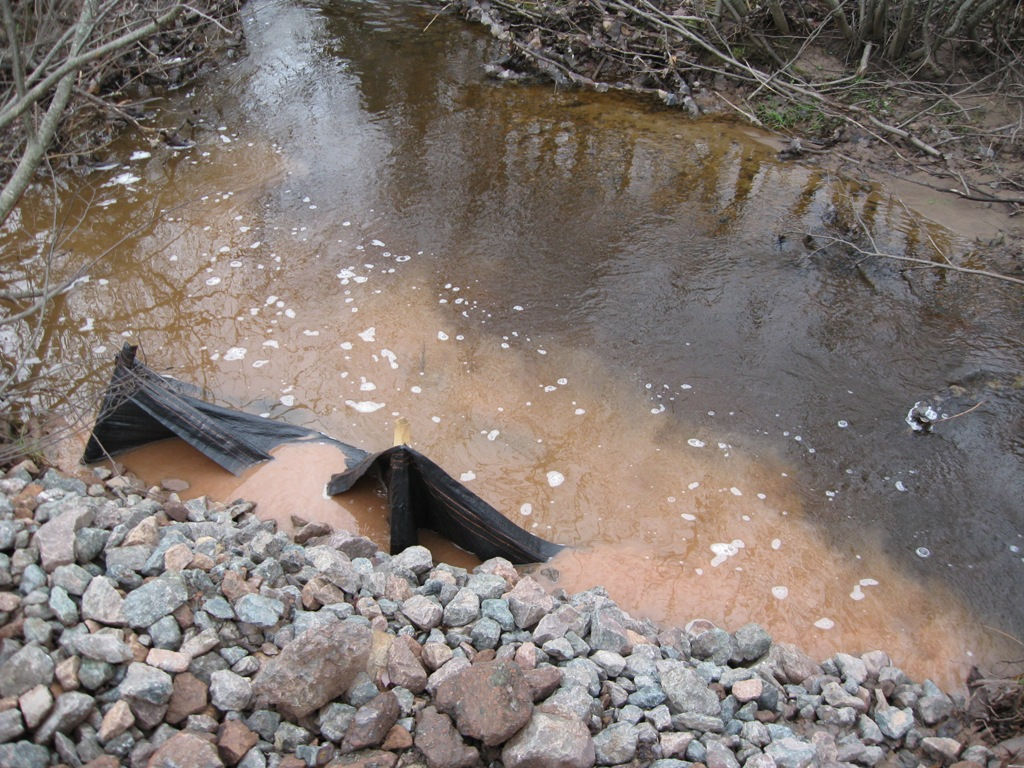
A polluted waterway in the Petitcodiac River watershed

The Petitcodiac River was listed in 2003 as the most endangered river in Canada by Earthwild International, and was listed second, behind Quebec's Rupert River, in 2002. The causeway was cited as one of the major factors behind the river's degraded health. The Canadian Council of Ministers of the Environment's Water Quality Index gave two study sites an "excellent" rating, 20 sites a "good" rating, 27 sites a "fair" rating, and five sites a "marginal" rating.

Since 1999, the Petitcodiac Watershed Alliance (known as the Petitcodiac Watershed Monitoring Group at the time) has collected water samples from May to October to study bacteria, nutrient, pH, dissolved oxygen (DO), and sediment levels. Two sampling sites, one upstream from the causeway and one downstream, were used during the 2009 study. The river had an average temperature of 27 °C (81 °F) in August at the upstream location, in contrast to the average of 20.1 °C (68.2 °F) at the same site over the total period of the study. E. coli levels were high upstream, and above recreationally safe levels downstream in June, July, and August. Nitrates and phosphates failed to meet the safe quality threshold on occasion. A publication by the New Brunswick Department of Environment in 2007 showed that the watershed did not meet the quality guidelines for E. coli in 10 percent of samples, for dissolved oxygen in 5 percent of samples, and pH in 3 percent of samples; in contrast, the river was always within safe nitrate levels.

During their 2001 study, the Petitcodiac Watershed Alliance noted the effects of agriculture on the river's water quality, and recommended to work with local farmers to install cattle fencing around streams which run through their properties, and "eventually phase out" cosmetic pesticide usage. The Petitcodiac Riverkeeper holds a stronger position on the issue: the organisation notes that pesticides "find their way into the surface and ground water by leaching into the soil or as part of stormwater runoff." They request that, while measures have been taken in 2009 by the provincial government to regulate cosmetic pesticide usage, the province must forbid its usage altogether and require chemical manufacturers to disclose health warnings and all ingredients on labels. The New Brunswick Department of Environment also warned of the erosion caused by the removal of the river's riparian zones, which is a common "land use practice".

Although mining around the area essentially stopped with the closure of the gypsum mines in 1982, uranium mining has surfaced as a potential problem for the river. The province was the subject of a controversy in 2007 when it gave Vale Limited (formerly known as CVRD Inco) the right to mine for uranium at Turtle Creek, where the Greater Moncton water reservoir is maintained. Environmentalists warned of the dangers related to the move, fearing that contaminants could be pushed into the surrounding water. The Petitcodiac Riverkeeper also noted uranium mining's "irreversible effects to the health of ecosystems, watersheds, wildlife, agriculture, recreation, and public health", and joined 30 other environmental groups in asking the provincial government to establish a ban on the act. The province would later restrict uranium mining to 300 m (980 ft) from residential areas and ban it from protected drinking water areas. Another controversy in 2006 involved exploration for oil and gas deposits in the same area, but access was blocked by the municipal government.

Shortly after the building of the causeway, a 35 ha (86-acre) landfill was built near the river. Various materials were disposed of in the area, including petroleum waste oil, pipe and foam insulation, sewage sludge, and medical waste. While the landfill was shut down in 1992, samples by the Environmental Bureau of Investigation and the Petitcodiac Riverkeeper showed that ammonium levels around the leachate exceeded Canadian quality guidelines by as much as 15 times, and contained heavy metals, petroleum hydrocarbons, and PCBs. A mortality rate of 100 percent was found for test trout and daphnia when exposed to water samples. Gemtec Limited, the company responsible for planning and closing the landfill, and the City of Moncton were charged on 12 March 2002, for offences relating to the Canadian Environmental Protection Act (1999) and the Fisheries Act. The city pleaded guilty on 23 September 2003, paid a $35,000 fine, and was ordered to help reduce the leachate flow from the landfill. Three years later, Gemtec Limited was fined a total of $6,000 and was ordered to contribute a total of $22,000 to the federal Environmental Damages Fund and the Jonathan Creek Committee.

=== Discharge ===
The river aids in the drainage of ten significant bodies of water: Weldon Creek, Fox Creek, Mill Creek, Halls Creek, Jonathan Creek, Turtle Creek, Little River, Pollett River, Anagance River, and North River. A report in 2000 showed that it handles an average discharge of 27.3 m^{3}/s (960 cu ft/s) at the causeway yearly, with a recorded high of 730 m^{3}/s (26,000 cu ft/s) in 1962 and a low of 0.36 m^{3}/s (13 cu ft/s) in 1966. The same report estimated mean values for the minimum and maximum discharges for every two-year, 10-year, and 100-year flood events, and minimum discharges for every two-year, five-year, and 100-year "drought" events:

Mean maximum and minimum discharges at the Riverview Causeway
	Minimum		Maximum		
	m^{3}/s	cu ft/s	m^{3}/s	cu ft/s	
Two-year low	1.5	53	293	10,300	Two-year high
Five-year low	0.92	32	457	16,100	Ten-year high
100-year low	0.32	11	655	23,100	100-year high
Record low	0.36	12	730	25,780	Record high

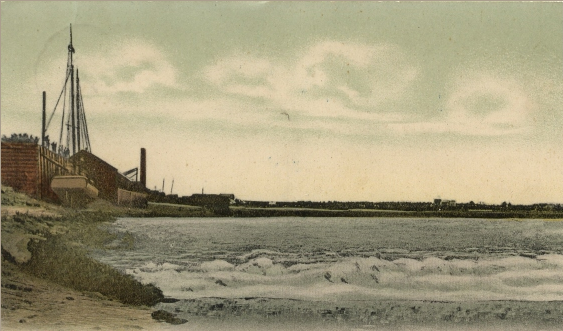
A reproduction of the tidal bore in 1906

=== Tidal bore ===
The Petitcodiac River tidal bores—retrograde waves moving upstream over downstream waves—occur twice a day and come from the world's highest tides in the Bay of Fundy. The first European mention of the bore was by British Lieutenant Colonel George Scott on 17 November 1758, during a downstream voyage from Moncton to Fort Frederick, near Saint John. The Admiralty referred to the tidal bore in a hydrographic chart published in 1861, observing that "[after] its passage the rise of the tide is very rapid until high water is attained", and that "[during the lowest tides] the Bore still appears but its broken front usually is only a few inches high."

The bores ranged from 1 to 2 m (3.3–6.6 ft) in height, with speeds from 5 to 13 km/h (3.1–8.1 mph). In 1825, Peter Fisher noted that the "noise of the Bore is heard a great distance, and animals immediately take to the highland, and manifest visible signs of terror if near it." Before the causeway (1968), values were compared with the tidal bores of the Qiantang, Hooghly and Amazon rivers. After the causeway was built, the bores reached heights from about 5 to 75 cm (2.0–29.5 in).

== Wildlife ==
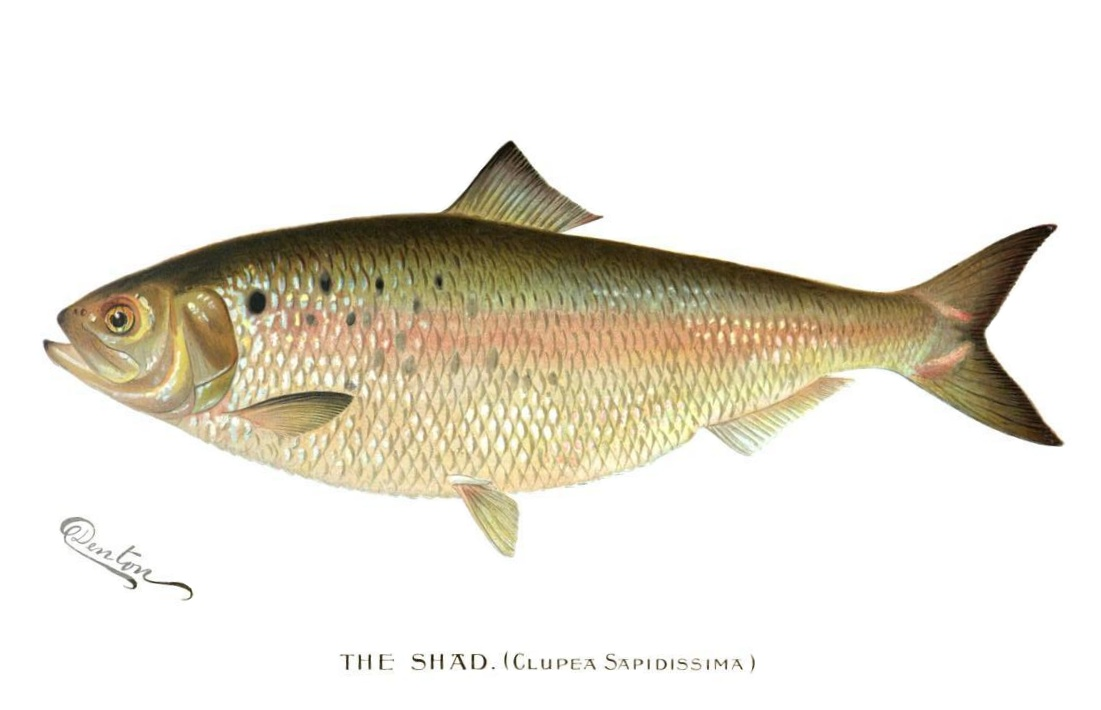
A shad. The American shad is one of the four fish species that have disappeared from the river since 1968.

Before the construction of the causeway, the Petitcodiac River was home to many aquatic species. Fish originally included hundreds of thousands of Atlantic tomcod and rainbow smelt, tens of thousands of gaspereau and American shad, thousands of American eel, Atlantic salmon, brook trout, lamprey, and striped bass and hundreds of Atlantic sturgeon. Other fish include the blueback herring, the brown bullhead, the chain pickerel, the smallmouth bass, the white perch, and the white sucker. Marine mammals were uncommon, but normally consisted of pilot whales, Atlantic white-sided dolphins, harbour porpoise, harbour seals, and porbeagles. Freshwater mollusc species included the brook floater, the dwarf wedgemussel, the eastern elliptio, the eastern floater, the eastern pearlshell, and the triangle floater. Many other aquatic organisms are thought to have once entered the watershed due to the low salinity of the water.

Six species have disappeared from the river since the mid-1980s. The Petitcodiac River was the only known Canadian habitat of the dwarf wedgemussel, and was later isolated to just nine American watersheds after its elimination from the Petitcodiac. The Atlantic salmon is no longer present in the watershed, and has since been listed as an endangered species in Canada. The American shad was a favourite with fishermen, and represented two-thirds of the entire Canadian shad landings from 1870 to 1900; catches peaked at 0.91 to 2.72 million kilograms (two to six million pounds) per year. Three other species have been eliminated from the river: the striped bass, the Atlantic sturgeon, and the Atlantic tomcod. However, a project of the Petitcodiac Riverkeeper, funded by the Government of Canada's Environmental Damage Fund in 2005, noted that the removal of the causeway would result in a "good" chance of bringing back the eliminated species, and an "excellent" chance of increasing the numbers of species deemed to have been reduced in numbers. No data has been released for the Atlantic salmon or the striped bass.

Various insects and arachnids reside around the Petitcodiac River. Among them is the stonefly, the mayfly, the caddisfly, the simulium, the subfamily of tanypodinae, and the Hydracarina. Non-native species, such as the black-footed spider, the beech scale, the white-marked tussock moth, and the mountain ash sawfly have also made their home in the Petitcodiac River watershed. At the southern extremities of the watershed, 50 to 90 percent of the world's semipalmated sandpipers feed on the mud shrimp at Shepody Bay. Around 269,445 stop there before migrating to South America, a number which accounts for at least 7.7 percent of the total population. Among others, the semipalmated plover (around 2 percent of the North American population), the short-billed dowitcher, the red knot, the sanderling, and the least sandpiper are also known for migrating through the Important Bird Area.

A diverse number of plant species reside in the watershed as well. Red, white, and black spruce, red maple, white birch, and trembling aspen are the most common. Jack pine is commonly found in regions that fires have repeatedly ravished, while cedar is found in bogs and areas where gypsum and limestone are present. Higher altitude slopes and ridgetops house sugar maple, beech, and yellow birch trees. Zelazny et al. note that "[the] high frequency of disturbed sites dominated by aspen stands reveals the degree of historical and recent human disturbance along the Petitcodiac River." The Petitcodiac River's riparian zone houses a number of trees, including willows, white spruce, white pine, and speckled alder. Other trees, such as the tamarack and white pine, can also be found in the watershed. Plants such as the rufous bulrush tend to grow near calcareous areas, and hemlock can be found in small, pure stands. Alien plant species include the mother-of-thyme, the Japanese barberry, the Scotch broom, the yellow flag, and Canada bluegrass.

In 1937, the 37,000-year-old skeleton of a mastodon was discovered by workers near Hillsborough. It was in near perfect condition and was transported to the New Brunswick Museum in Saint John, where it has been displayed ever since.

== Geology ==
The Petitcodiac River watershed covers an area north and east of the Caledonian Highlands; a low-elevation (on average 67 m; 220 ft) region with rolling hills, valleys, and ridges. In fact, most of the region was below sea level, beneath the former DeGeer and Goldthwait seas, during the quaternary period. Non-calcareous Pennsylvanian (and younger) sandstones, conglomerates, silt, and red- to grey-tinted mudstone now compose the majority of the bedrock. The northern shore of the Petitcodiac River, including the Anagance and North rivers, is primarily made up of shale with volcanic rocks, mixed igneous rocks, and felsic pebble conglomerates. The southern shore, including the Little and Pollett rivers, is composed of Precambrian or Lower-Palaeozoic sedimentary, igneous, and volcanic rocks, and limestone. Both shores include red to grey Mississippian sandstone. Red beds, or red-tinted sedimentary rocks, have a higher occurrence around Strait Shores. Other significant Mississippian-era rock patches appear in two areas around the watershed. The first is located near the north-western border of the watershed, near Lutes Mountain and Cornhill. The second ranges from the east of the Memramcook River to the west of Hillsborough, in Beech Hill. The Petitcodiac River watershed also features karst topography, where gypsum and limestone around Mississippian rocks dilute into the circulating groundwater. This creates sinkholes, depressions, and caves. Examples of rare karst occurrences appear west of the village of Three Rivers, where large sinkholes alternate between small ridges to form honeycomb-shaped patterns. Hillsborough is the home of one of the longest gypsum cave networks in eastern Canada, and is a key habitat for bats in hibernation.

The majority of the watershed's topsoil is composed of sand, clay, and silt, under which normally lies a layer of ablation moraines. Fairly rich soils made of alluvium and tidal deposits are found along the Petitcodiac and Memramcook rivers, and have often been exploited for agricultural purposes. A publication by the New Brunswick Department of Natural Resources notes that the soils in Salisbury, made from calcareous sandstone and mudstone, are fine-textured and, when properly drained, "are the most fertile glacial tills" in the watershed. In contrast, they note, soils deriving from local conglomerates are more coarse and sandy, and are less fertile.

Albertite, a type of asphalt, was first found in Albert County in 1849 by the Canadian geologist Abraham Gesner, inventor of kerosene. Over 200,000 tonnes of the mineral were shipped to Boston within 30 years. Large deposits of gypsum found eight kilometres (five miles) from the mining site were shipped around the globe as well. The Petitcodiac River was used as the primary means for transporting the minerals at the time.

== History ==
=== Colonisation (1604–1698) ===
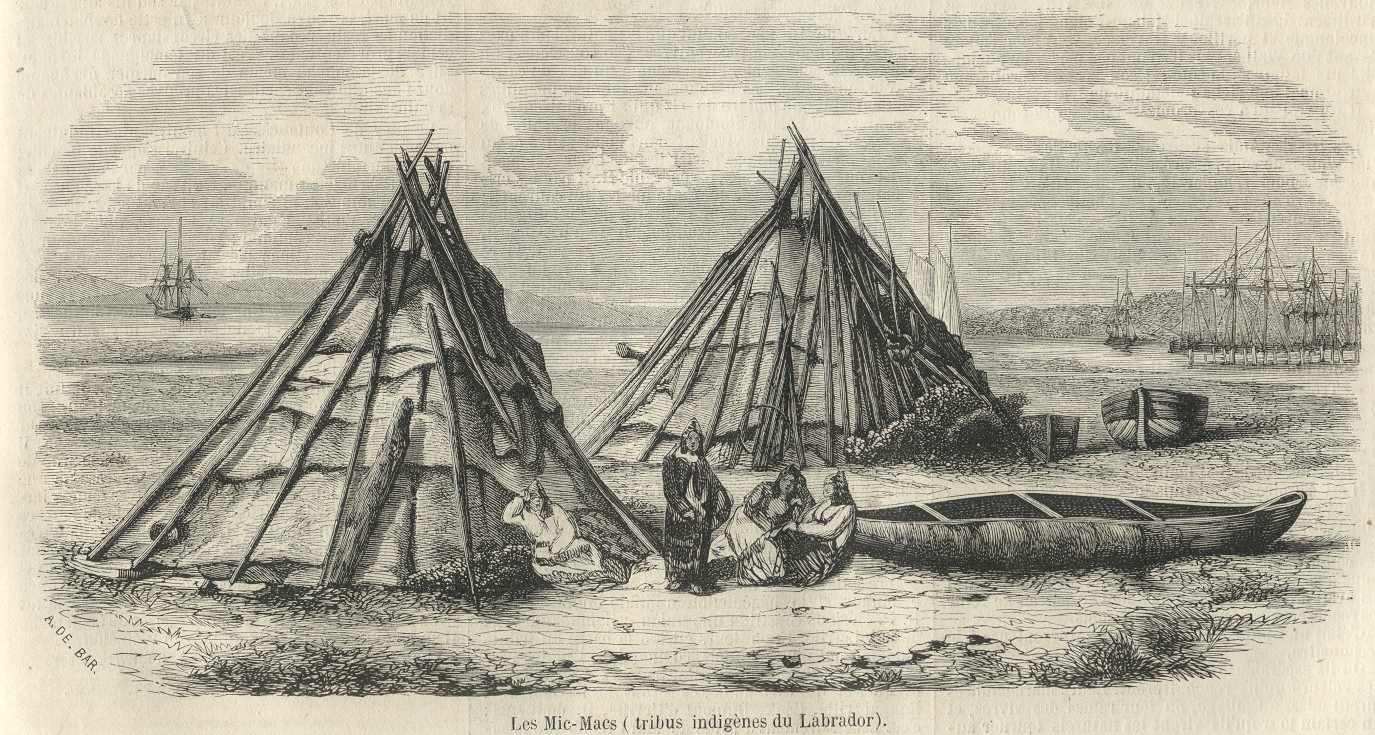
A Mi'kmaq tribe in Labrador

The Petitcodiac River region was first settled by the Mi'kmaq, who used the river's upstream current as part of a portage route between Shubenacadie and a winter camp at the confluence of the Anagance and North rivers. The first Europeans arrived in early 1604, when a French expedition to Acadia (now Nova Scotia and New Brunswick), led by the explorer Pierre Dugua de Mons and accompanied by cartographer Samuel de Champlain and future Acadian governor Jean de Biencourt, sailed into the Bay of Fundy. Hoping to find an ideal site for a settlement, they passed Advocate Harbour and the Saint John River before Dugua chose to settle on Saint Croix Island in present-day Maine. Although they did not explore the Petitcodiac region, they returned to the coasts of eastern Nova Scotia, where they founded Port Royal. In 1676, Jacques Bourgeois, a colonist from the Nova Scotian settlement, settled in the area of Beaubassin (now the Tantramar Marshes). By 1685, its population had grown to 129, with 19 out of the 22 families living permanently in the region. Pierre Thibodeau, also from Port Royal, founded Chipody (Chipoudie) near Shepody Bay in 1698. At this time, the inhabitants often referred to the Petitcodiac, Memramcook, and Shepody River area as "Trois-Rivières" (Three Rivers) (not to be confused with Trois-Rivières, Quebec).

=== Acadian History (1698–1763) ===
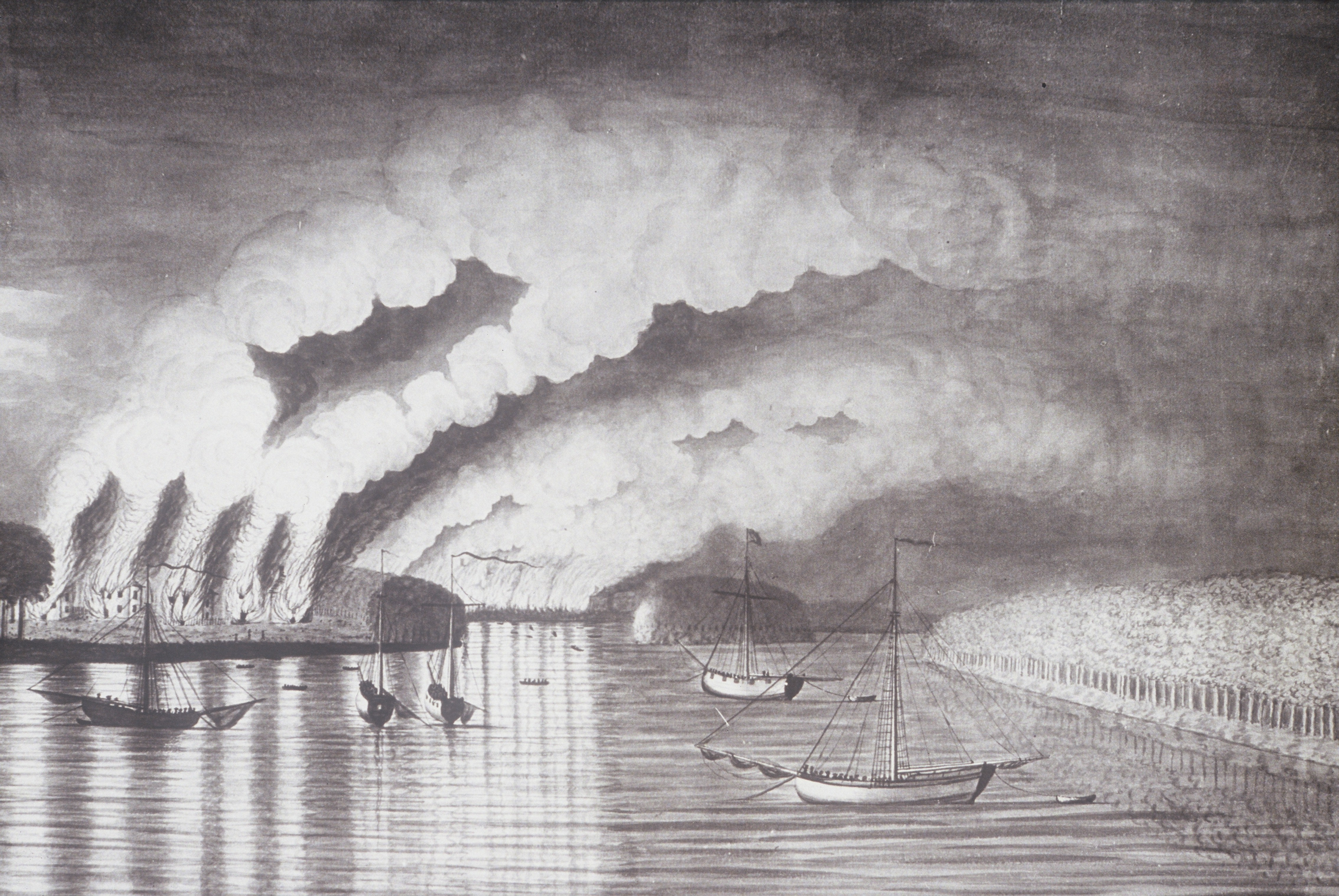
The St. John River Campaign, part of expulsion

The French and Indian War erupted in 1754 amid tensions between the British and the French over control of the Ohio Valley. Initially, the inhabitants of Acadia were uninvolved in the conflict because the French had already ceded the land to Britain under the Treaty of Utrecht (1713). The Acadians were asked to take an oath declaring complete fidelity toward the British monarch on several occasions, but they refused. At first, they were not punished for doing so. A declaration of neutrality was signed in 1730 and was accepted by Nova Scotia governor Richard Philipps. This earned the Acadians the nickname the "neutral French". At the outbreak of war in 1754, the British again demanded unconditional oaths of fealty, perceiving the Acadians as a possible threat. In spite of resistance led by Jean-Louis Le Loutre, representatives eventually agreed to sign, but their reluctance persuaded Governor Charles Lawrence to order the Acadian population expelled from British territory.

About 1,100 Acadians living around the Petitcodiac River were affected by this decision. Two hundred British troops led by Major Joseph Frye were sent to destroy the settlements of the Three Rivers, beginning with Shepody and Village-des-Blanchard (now Hillsborough). French resistance commander Charles Deschamps de Boishébert, hoping to evacuate as many Acadians as possible, was unable to march the distance between Nerepis and the Shepody settlement in time, but fought at the second threatened village on 28 August 1755. Boishébert's troops, composed of inhabitants from the area and from Shepody, counter-attacked, suffering only one loss to twenty-three British casualties. This defeat is thought to have been the reason for the British abandonment of the campaign at the Three Rivers. The commander and the evacuated Acadians, whom Edward Larracey estimated to total around 700, suffered a massive famine from 1756 to 1758, largely caused by the scarce resources following the battle.

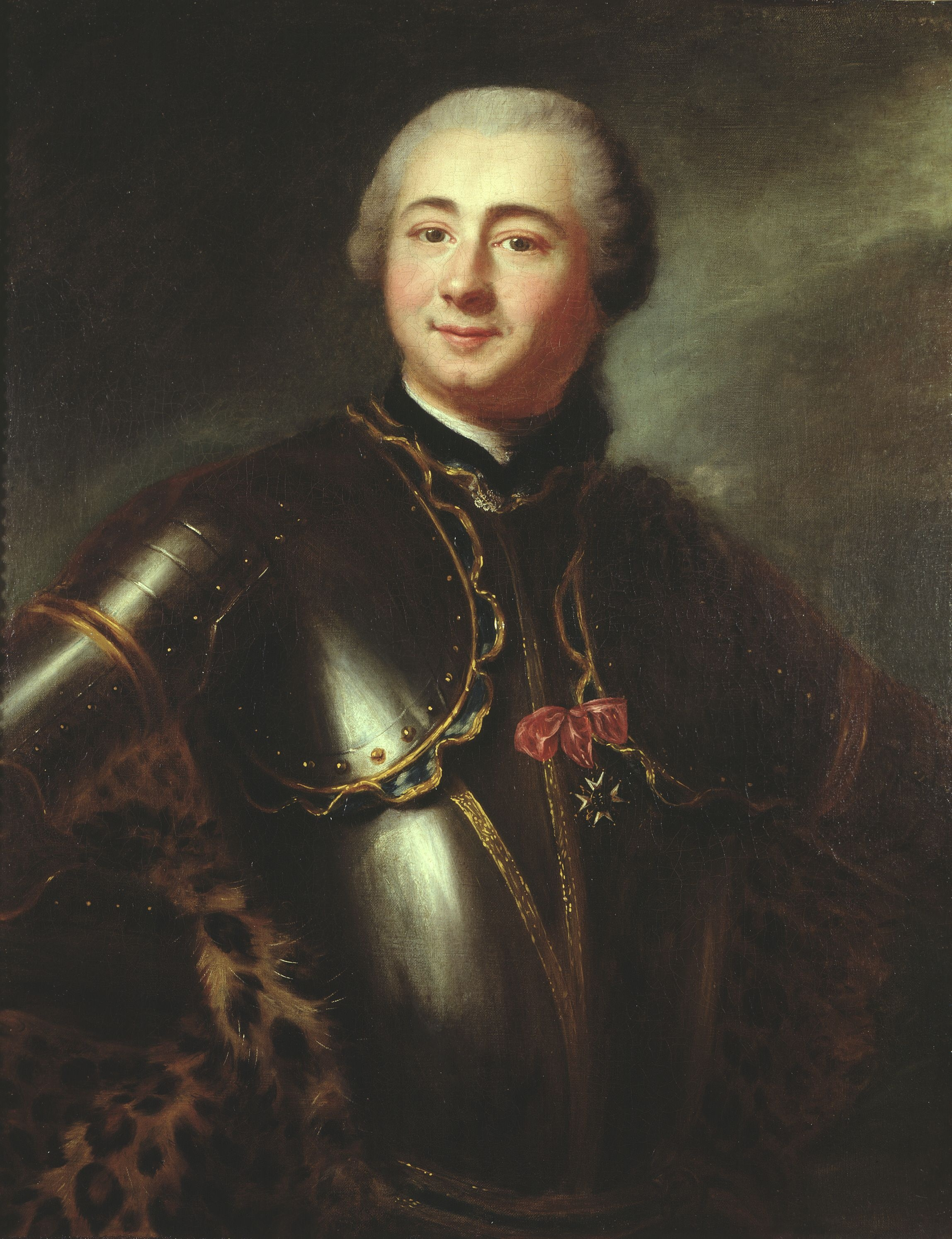
Charles Deschamps de Boishébert

In 1758, Joseph Broussard, also known as Beausoleil by the locals, led raids against British vessels sailing in the Bay of Fundy and the Cumberland Basin. This provoked the British into initiating two raids of their own. The first took place in February in Shediac, where Lieutenant Colonel George Scott tried to find Boishébert. When they were returning, Boishébert ambushed them, killing two of Scott's gunmen. The second raid took place at the settlement of Shepody in March, where the British were shocked to find that the Acadians had already begun rebuilding their homes. On 28 June, Scott learned of reports that cattle were stolen outside of Fort Beausejour; the British issued an order for Captain Beloni Danks to send 75 men up the Petitcodiac River. They arrived in Moncton the following night, and about 30 Acadians began firing at their vessel. However, Danks held his offensive position, and the British killed 19 Acadians, taking nine others prisoner. He and his troops continued to sail up the river the next day; they sent 60 men to burn a settlement 9.7 km (6 mi) west of Moncton. Historians presume that the area had already been deserted.

Acadians continued to survive in the region, overcoming the results of the raids. Scott sailed back to the region to search for Beausoleil and to weaken the Acadians before the winter. He arrived in Moncton near midnight on 12 November, but the tide of the Petitcodiac River prevented him from sending more than twelve men. They came back the next morning with 16 prisoners. Scott was told that the area was virtually defenceless, so he sent three parties to La Chapelle (now Bore Park in Moncton), Silvabro (now Lewisville), and Jagersome (now Dieppe). Scott recorded no deaths or prisoners, but all buildings in sight were burned, and cattle were brought back onto the vessel. Additional raids by Scott between 14 and 17 November captured a dozen Acadian prisoners, burned settlements, and uncovered Beausoleil's own schooner. The crew sent an Acadian prisoner on the 17th to request the surrender of the remaining residents, but when he returned, he reported that they had all begun to flee to Cocagne, Shediac, and the settlements around the Miramichi River. This prompted Scott to return to Fort Frederick in Saint John.

A few of the Acadians migrating to the Miramichi River probably died of hypothermia during the trip due to the 1758–59 winter. Those who survived joined the refugees already present, who had been persuaded by Boishébert to seek refuge there. Inadequate housing and supplies, among other reasons, led to the deterioration of the reputation of the French commander, and only 700 Acadians remained there by late 1759. Meanwhile, the raiding rapidly took its toll on the residents who stayed around the Three Rivers, as food supplies became scarce and reconstruction became impossible. The fall of Quebec City in September 1759 also eliminated the possibility of assistance from that area. On 16 November 1759, the 190 Acadians in the region sent a delegate to Fort Beauséjour (which had been renamed Fort Cumberland) to announce their surrender to the newly promoted Colonel Frye. The settlements of Miramichi, Richibucto, and Bouctouche surrendered the next day, with a delegate sent to the fort to represent their 700 refugees. Frye requested and received permission from Governor Lawrence to take them in for the winter. The Acadian refugees were offered land on the Isthmus of Chignecto in early 1760, but most requested their original lands around the Three Rivers, which the governor granted.

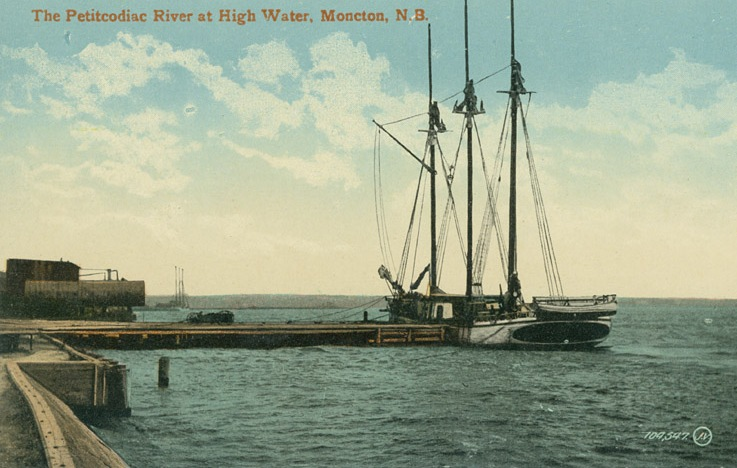
A sailing ship on the Petitcodiac River in 1910.

=== Resettlement and Modern History (1763–present) ===
After the Treaty of Paris (1763), exiled Acadians began to return to the area, but their numbers around the Three Rivers remained under 200 by 1769. Settlers from Philadelphia began to migrate to the Petitcodiac River area in 1766: the Trites, Jones and Stieff families moved to present-day Moncton, but the Stieff family (now Steeves), later moved south-east to Hillsborough. Nine families bought land up to 21 km (13 mi) west from the bend of the river, ranging from 1,718 to 2,193 acres (695–887 ha) per grant. In 1829, the population of Moncton reached 100, composed mainly of descendants of these settlers.

Moncton's shipbuilding era began in 1840 with the arrival of Stewart Russell, a shipbuilder from Hopewell. Russell built the Aginora, which sailed down the Petitcodiac River to trade at the ports in Saint John and New England. The ship and its crew sank in a storm on 24 December 1850, during a trip to Boston for Christmas. A ferry service on the Petitcodiac River was launched around 1841, thanks to a license obtained by Simon Outhouse. The Larch, built by Stephen Binney in 1845, was another important vessel, becoming the largest to sail on the river. But it was not until the arrival of Joseph Salter in 1846 that the shipbuilding boom began: a shipyard founded by Binney and Salter produced 24 vessels from 1847 to 1859, and employed almost 500 of the 1,000 inhabitants in Moncton. Salter would become the first mayor of Moncton in April 1855, the year the town was incorporated.

The European and North American Railway was extended to link Pointe-du-Chene to Moncton in 1857, with an eventual goal of reaching Saint John in 1860. The move, according to Larracey, caused the town to become "but a station stop along a railway line". This coincided with the failure of Moncton's shipbuilding industry and a population drop from a peak of 2,000 to about 500. The town declared bankruptcy and was unincorporated in 1862, but it later regained its status in 1875, after it became the Intercolonial Railway's headquarters for its shops in 1871. While the Petitcodiac River continued to aid in the shipping of goods into the 20th century, shipbuilding essentially ended in the 1890s. The final vessel built in Moncton was the Woolastook II on 14 May 1980, while the final ship to sail up the Petitcodiac River was the Inox from France, which arrived on 12 July 1986, (and was, ironically, stranded in Moncton until 3 November due to the river's tidal fluctuations).

In 1924, the Petitcodiac Tidal Power Company proposed a tidal power project. This called for a dam to be built between Hopewell Cape and Fort Folly Point. The company sold shares to raise funds for the project and a series of on-site and airborne studies were conducted by the federal government, but the project fell through by 1928. As rail transport became more common, it displaced river transportation around the Great Depression. In addition, the Greater Moncton International Airport offered an airmail service from Moncton to Montreal by 29 December 1929. These factors further marginalised the Petitcodiac.

The Gunningsville Bridge, which crosses the Petitcodiac River to link Moncton and Riverview, was built in 1867. It was damaged and rebuilt on four different occasions. The first was following the Saxby Gale of 1869, which forced the town to rebuild the bridge in 1872. It went under "extensive repairs" mid-1892, but ice build-up from the Petitcodiac continued to pose a threat for the wooden structure, leading to the construction of a new steel version from 1915 to 1919. This fourth bridge would suffer through many collisions, including one with the Mayflower in September 1929, which caused the ship to capsize and drown two men. The Gunningsville Bridge would last 86 years before it would be demolished a final time, making way for a 425-metre-long (1,394 ft) four-lane bridge crossing. Covered bridges were also built over the Petitcodiac River, the final extant one being "Hasty", built in 1929.

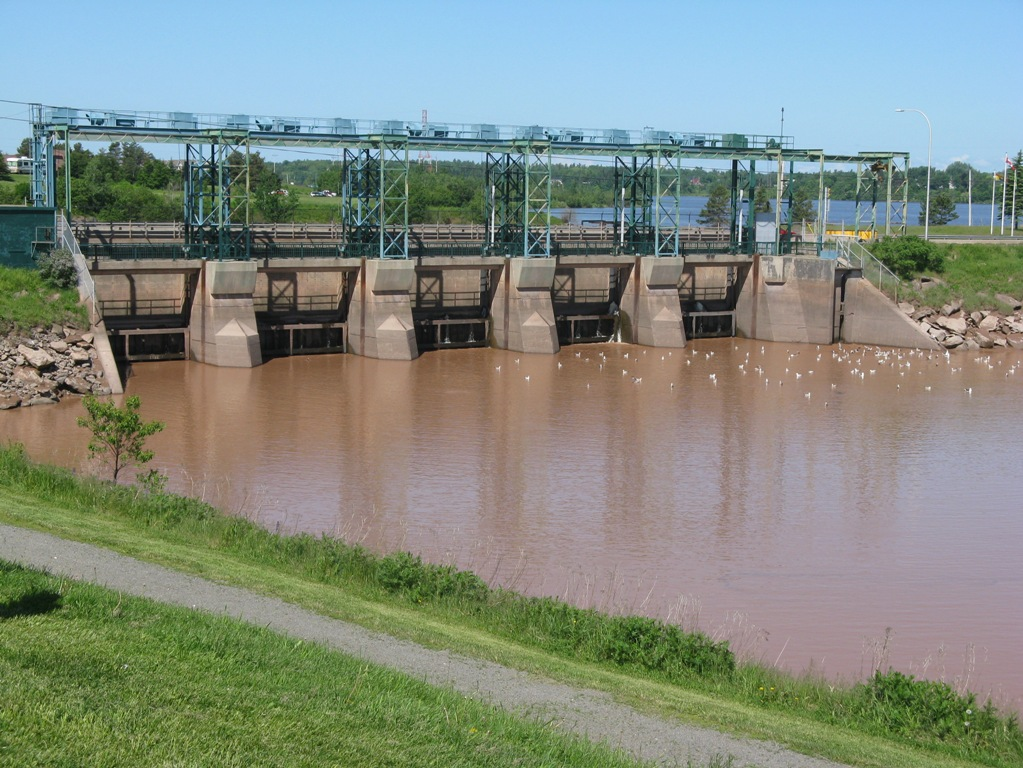
A view of the Petitcodiac River Causeway from the east (downstream) side, featuring the former causeway gates.

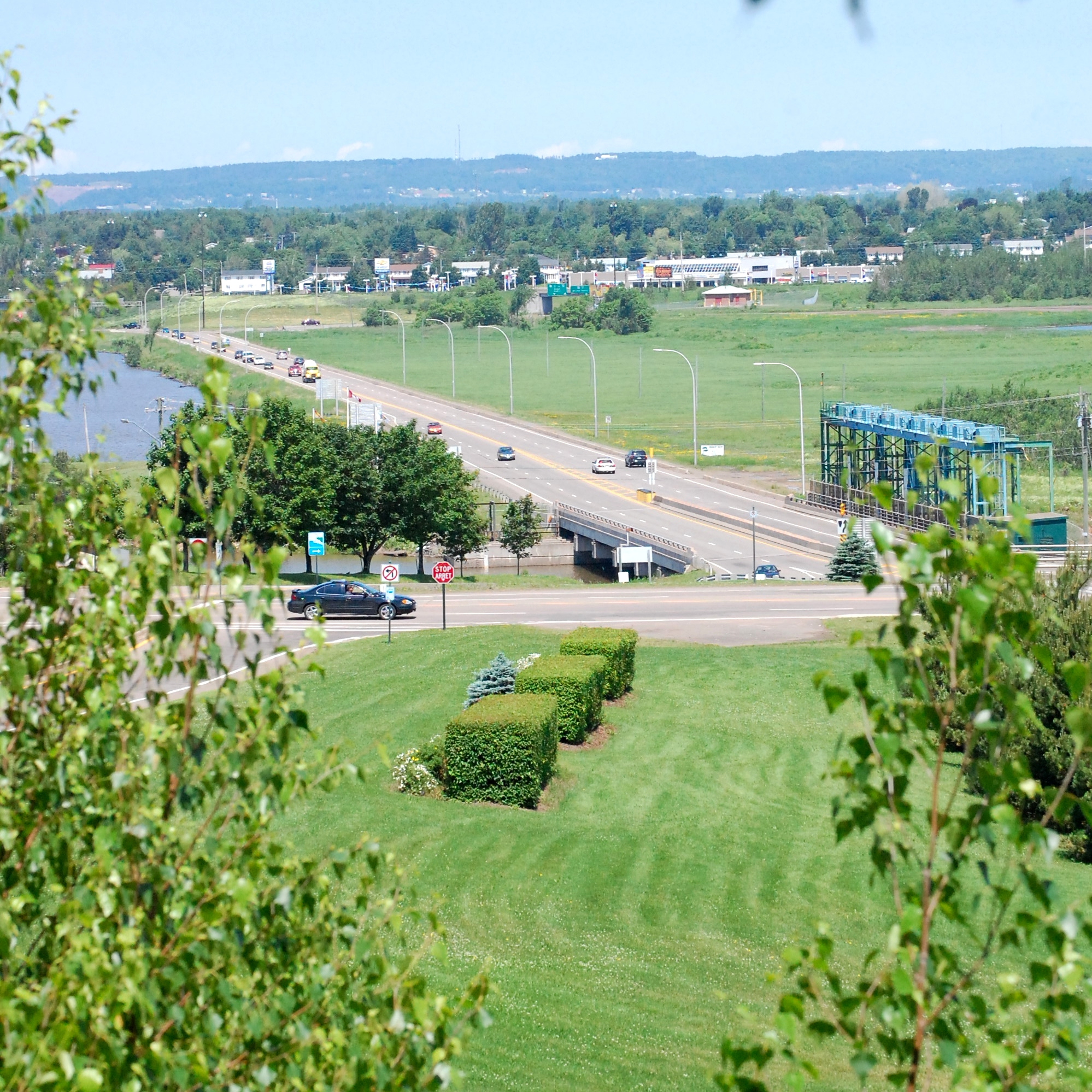
A view of Route 114 from Riverview, held up by the Petitcodiac River Causeway.

=== Causeway Controversy (1968–present) ===
In 1968, the provincial and federal governments completed the construction of a causeway between the communities of Moncton and Riverview, to provide a crossing over the river, and to keep water levels from impeding agricultural production. This was a benefit for the federal government at the time, which had constantly maintained the dykes in the area. It also benefited the provincial government, as the federal government was willing to fund the $3 million project, but not a bridge. Although the causeway was equipped with a fishway, problems arose when fish were unable to cross it freely due to sedimentation build-up; some 82 percent of the salmon were prevented from travelling upstream by the structure. The sediment accumulated in the 4.7 km (2.9 mi) of river downstream from the causeway, with over 10 million cubic metres (13 million cubic yards) of silt deposited in the first three years following construction. Several reports from 1969 to 1971 described its impact on the aquatic ecosystem, and proposals for amendments to the causeway gates were released, but no action was taken. In 1976 and 1977, reports pointed out several problems related to the gates' function due to erosion, winter ice jams, and "unsatisfactory fishway operation".

It was not until 1978 that New Brunswick's Department of Transportation commissioned a study of the problems. The final report recommended three alternatives for action: to continue operation "as-is", to continue operation without the gates, or to eliminate gate leakage and amend the operation protocol. The third alternative was chosen two years later, but did not substantially improve fish migration as expected. The provincial government decided to open the gates between 15 April and 7 July 1988, to allow fish to migrate up the stream. This was repeated from 26 September to 31 October 1988, and in the spring of 1989 and 1990 during low tides. In 1991, New Brunswick's Department of Oceans and Fisheries recommended opening the gates from April to December each year. A provincial government committee report recommended an additional seven options for the modification of the causeway in May 1992, but the government did not act upon any of these options due to the low "cost-benefit" factor. More reports documented problems related to the passage of fish in the river until 1995, when the Department of Transportation agreed to open one gate from April to December, as suggested four years earlier. A project was then organized in December 1996 to begin a trial for the systematic opening of the gates during the year, but conditions could not be physically met, and it was terminated on 1 June 1999.

In February 2001, the Niles Report proposed an additional four modifications to the causeway project: to either replace the fishway, open the gates during peak fish migration, open the gates permanently, or replace the entire causeway with a bridge. An Environmental Impact Assessment study was commissioned in 2003 to develop and summarise these options, and on its completion in 2005, it announced the recognition of "Option 3" and "Option 4" as possible solutions. The first option had been ruled out following the evaluation of other fish passage models, which were deemed inapplicable to the river. The second, suggesting systematic gate-opening periods, was ruled out because of the inability to cater to every marine species' migration periods. Option 4 was split into three sub-options, mainly to list possible bridge lengths: 170, 280, and 315 metres (190, 310, and 344 yards). The provincial government later accepted the proposal on 6 December 2006, and selected "Option 4B" on 7 August 2007, which called for a 280 m (310 yd) bridge in the place of the causeway.

The project was divided into three phases, expected to cost a total of $68 million. Phase 1 consisted of the prevention of erosion along the shorelines, improvements to the nearby drainage system, and the construction of dikes and aboiteaux; the work was carried out from 7 July 2008, to 14 April 2010. Phase 2 consisted of opening the gates to monitor river flow, both upstream and downstream, for two years. Phase 3 commenced in 2012 and consisted of the bridge's development and the removal of the causeway, which was completed on 17 September 2021. Confusion arose as to whether or not the project would be funded by the federal government. They refused, in spite of an earlier comment from the Department of Fisheries and Oceans, which had hinted at a possible negotiation. Unwilling to wait, the provincial government came forward with an initial $20 million on 7 July 2008, to begin the first phase.

The approach of Phase 2 was met with various complaints. A biology professor at the Université de Moncton noted that $200,000–$250,000 worth of pesticide would be required to keep the mosquito population around the city of Moncton from doubling once the gates open. Flood warnings were issued by the provincial Department of Supply and Services for the town of Riverview, warning that high river tides could lead to the flooding of over 3 hectares (7.4 acres) of sport fields and structures built in low-lying areas; however, they added that the causeway's flood gates were able to descend if required, eliminating the chances of such repercussions from a possible inundation. Residents near the headpond west of the causeway criticized the project, citing the decrease in property values of about 480 homes (by approximately 30 percent, according to the EIA report), the $68 million price tag, unstable ice conditions, and a lower water quality. In spite of legal threats by the Lake Petitcodiac Preservation Association (LAPPA) and various residents, the causeway opened its gates on 14 April 2010, coinciding with the beginning of various studies.

Since the opening, the river improved significantly, surpassing original expectations for the project. An AMEC engineer participating in the firm's studies, Jacques Paynter, said that the banks of the river had begun widening "at a noticeable pace", with the tidal bore growing closer to its pre-1968 levels: "We were actually anticipating a fairly modest increase in height. It seems to be already exceeding what we might have expected." He noted that an estimated 40,000 gaspereau had returned to the river, and called for more studies to determine the impact of the causeway's opening.

== Recreation ==
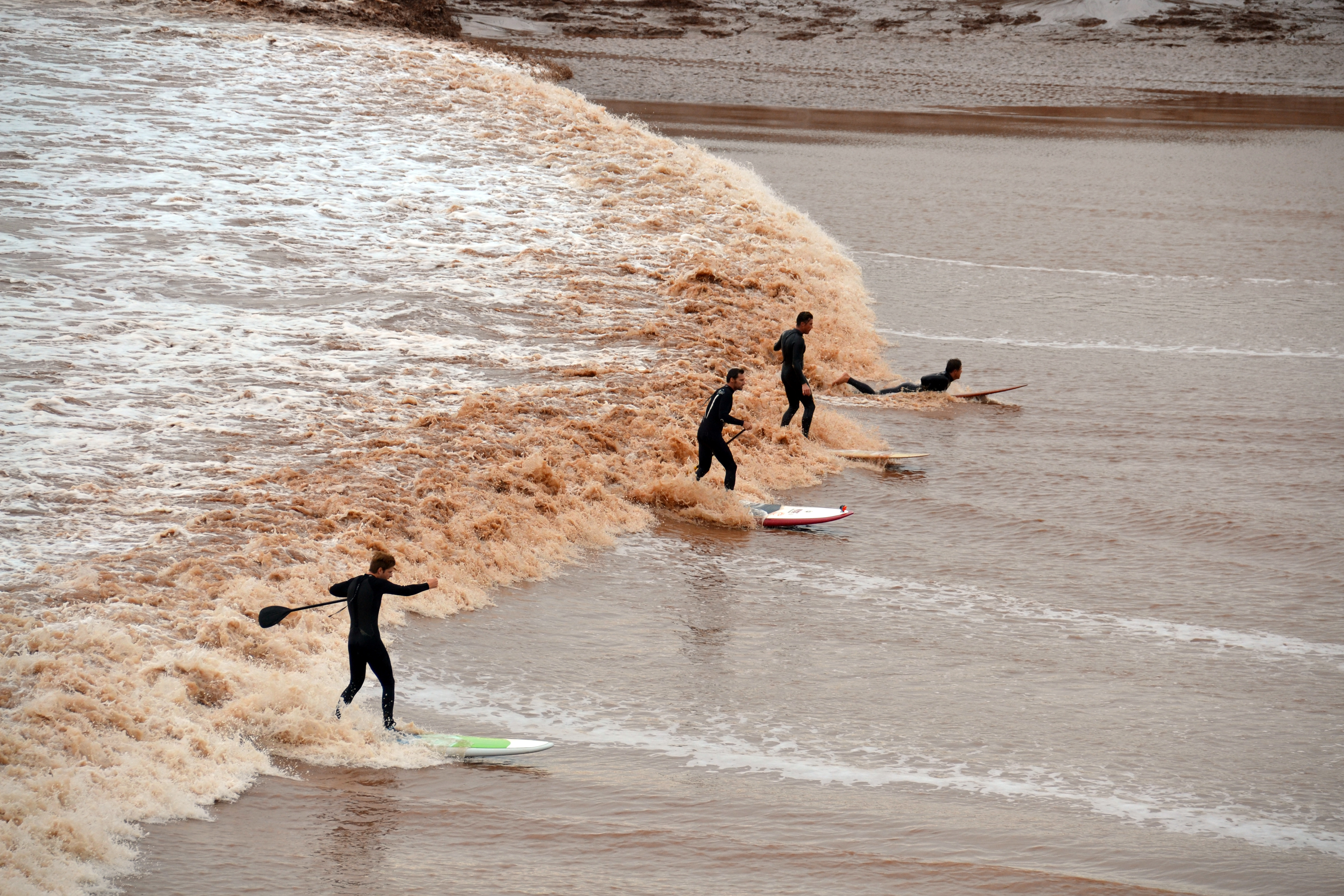
Surfing the Tidal Bore

Residents around the Petitcodiac have used the river for various recreational purposes. Trips were made annually via the river from Moncton to Beaumont for Feast of Saint-Anne celebrations with the locals. The Blakeson, a towboat owned by Blakeny and Sons, offered "moonlight cruises" in the early 1930s for 50 cents (approximately $6.50 in 2010 values). The service was popular until the towboat capsized in front of embarking passengers, causing them to lose interest. During their Environmental Impact Assessment in September 2005, AMEC cited recreational fishing and birdwatching as major pre-causeway activities. A fishery for Atlantic salmon existed downstream from the causeway for several years post-1968. The Moncton Naturalists' Club also publishes their Birding in the Moncton Area, a birdwatching guide covering sites from Sackville to Mary's Point. Other activities downstream from the causeway include boating, canoeing, kayaking, seal and harbour-porpoise viewing, and tour boating. On 24 July 2013, the North American record for surfing a single river wave was set by Wessels and Whitbread of California, who rode the Petitcodiac River's tidal bore 29 km (18 mi).

Before the opening of the causeway gates on 14 April 2010, the Petitcodiac River's 21 km (13 mi) headpond (west of the causeway), colloquially known as Lake Petitcodiac, was promoted by LAPPA as a recreational haven for residents in the area. According to the association, over 10,000 estimated hours of boating took place on the lake, in addition to canoeing, kayaking, motor boating, water skiing, jet skiing, sailing, and swimming. Fishing tournaments, dragon boat regattas, dog sledding, and snowmobiling were popular at the time as well. However, a study by the PWMG showed that fecal coliform levels in the headpond from June, July, and September 2009 exceeded 2,419 parts per 100 millilitres; more than 12 times the 200/100 ml recommended by the Canadian Water Quality Guidelines for recreational purposes.

Bore Park, located in the area formerly known as La Chapelle, became a popular tourist location by 1907 for watching the Petitcodiac's tidal bore move up the river twice a day. The area features information about the wave, as well as a clock indicating the time of its next appearance. Bore Park is a part of Riverfront Park, Greater Moncton's 5 km (3.1 mi) section of the Trans Canada Trail, where tourists may walk, bike, or skate along the riverfront. The trail continues west to Hillsborough and Fundy National Park, and east to Sackville, Nova Scotia, and Prince Edward Island. Jonathan Creek, Fox Creek, Halls Creek, and Mills Creek also offer trails that run along their streams.

== Lists ==
The following lists are ordered from the mouth of the river to its source.

=== Crossings ===
The river is crossed by 11 bridges.

Route	Description	Sources
	Gunningsville Bridge	
Route 114	The Honorable Brenda Robertson Bridge (Findlay Boulevard)	
	Salem and Hillsborough Railroad bridge, Salisbury	
Route 112	Coverdale River Road bridge, Salisbury	
	"Hasty" covered bridge, River Glade	
	Sanatorium Road bridge, River Glade	
	Canadian National Railway bridge, River Glade	
Route 1	Route 1 expressway crossing, River Glade	
	Plantation Road bridge	
	Canadian National Railway bridge, Three Rivers	
Route 106	Old Post Road bridge, Three Rivers	

=== Tributaries ===
The Petitcodiac River features ten named tributaries, which drain a total of 28 additional streams.

Name	Watershed area	Source	River bank	Mouth coordinates	Sources
Weldon Creek	89 km^{2} (34 sq mi)	Area near Weldon and Salem	Right	45°56′59″N 64°40′0″W	
Fox Creek	29 km^{2} (11 sq mi)	Area near Dieppe and Chartersville	Left	46°4′0″N 64°40′59″W	
Mill Creek	51 km^{2} (20 sq mi)	Town of Riverview	Left	46°4′0″N 64°43′59″W	
Halls Creek	125 km^{2} (48 sq mi)	City of Moncton (Sunny Brae and Tankville)	Left	46°5′42″N 64°46′4″W	
Jonathan Creek	50 km^{2} (19 sq mi)	City of Moncton (Centennial Park)	Left	46°4′0″N 64°46′59″W	
Turtle Creek	192 km^{2} (74 sq mi)	Area near Turtle Creek and Berryton	Right	46°3′0″N 64°52′59″W	
Little River	275 km^{2} (106 sq mi)	Area near Colpitts Settlement	Right	46°1′59″N 65°1′0″W	
Pollett River	314 km^{2} (121 sq mi)	Area near Kay Settlement	Right	45°59′13″N 65°5′27″W	
Anagance River	81 km^{2} (31 sq mi)	Hayward Brook, Holmes Brook	Right	45°55′37″N 65°11′20″W	
North River	264 km^{2} (102 sq mi)	Area around Intervale	Left	45°55′59″N 65°10′59″W	

== See also ==
- List of rivers of New Brunswick
- Petitcodiac Riverkeeper
- Riverfront Trail, Greater Moncton
