= List of neighbourhoods in New Brunswick =

In 2001, there were 103 municipalities in New Brunswick, including 7 cities, 27 towns and 69 villages. Many municipalities have been created from amalgamations of several former municipalities, or by annexing unincorporated areas. Province wide, municipalities include approximately 60% of the population and 20% of the land mass. Prior to several amalgamations that occurred from 1991 to 1998, the province had over 120 municipalities.

== List of neighbourhoods ==
This article lists neighbourhoods in municipalities in New Brunswick, the former municipalities that form the new municipality are listed and the year they joined the new municipality if known. Unincorporated areas that joined municipalities are mentioned as well, if known. Explanations on the basis of the amalgamations are given wherever possible.

| Name | Part of | Amalgamation date | Pop. 2012 | Pop. 2010 | Other |
|---|---|---|---|---|---|
| Rough Waters | Bathurst | | | | |
| Blair Athol | Balmoral | | | | |
| Bass River | Bathurst | | | | |
| Jacquet River | Belledune | 1994 | | | |
| Lily Lake Road | Campbellton | 1958 | | | |
| St Albert | Campbellton | 1958 | | | |
| Richardsville | Campbellton | 1979 | | | |
| Darlington | Dalhousie | 1982 | | | |
| St-Jacques | Edmundston | 1998 | | | |
| St-Basile | Edmundston | 1998 | | | |
| Verret | Edmundston | 1998 | | | |
| Florenceville | Florenceville-Bristol | 2008 | | | |
| Bristol | Florenceville-Bristol | 2008 | | | |
| Devon | Fredericton | 1945 | | | |
| Marysville | Fredericton | 1973 | | | |
| Barkers Point | Fredericton | 1973 | | | |
| Nashwaaksis | Fredericton | 1973 | | | |
| Silverwood | Fredericton | 1973 | | | |
| Grand Bay | Grand Bay-Westfield | 1998 | | | |
| Westfield | Grand Bay-Westfield | 1998 | | | |
| Pamdenec | Grand Bay-Westfield | 1988 | | | and part of the Parish of Westfield |
| North Head | Grand Manan | 1995 | | | |
| Seal Cove | Grand Manan | 1995 | | | |
| Grand Harbour | Grand Manan | 1995 | | | |
| Ingalls Head | Grand Manan | 1995 | | | |
| Woodwards Cove | Grand Manan | 1995 | | | |
| Castalia | Grand Manan | 1995 | | | |
| Newcastle | Miramichi | 1995 | | | |
| Chatham | Miramichi | 1995 | | | |
| Douglastown | Miramichi | 1995 | | | |
| Loggieville | Miramichi | 1995 | | | |
| Nelson-Miramichi | Miramichi | 1995 | | | |
| Nowlanville | Miramichi | 1995 | | | |
| Gondola Point | Quispamsis | 1998 | | | |
| Wells | Quispamsis | 1998 | | | |
| Albert | Riverside-Albert | 1966 | | | |
| Riverside | Riverside-Albert | 1966 | | | |
| East Riverside-Kingshurst | Rothesay | 1998 | | | |
| Fairvale | Rothesay | 1998 | | | |
| Wells | Rothesay | 1998 | | | Western Section |
| Carleton | Saint John | 1785 | | | |
| Indiantown | Saint John | | | | |
| Fairville | Saint John | | | | |
| Lorneville / Pisarinco | Saint John | 1969 | | | |
| Milford | Saint John | | | | |
| Millidgeville | Saint John | | | | |
| Mount Pleasant | Saint John | | | | |
| Parrtown | Saint John | 1785 | | | |
| Portland | Saint John | 1889 | | | |
| Randolph | Saint John | | | | |
| Loch Lomond | Saint John | | | | |
| Simonds Parish | Saint John | 1967 | | | |
| Lancaster Parish | Saint John | 1967 | | | |
| Lancaster | Saint John | 1967 | | | |
| Milltown | Saint Stephen | 1973 | | | |
| Tracadie | Tracadie-Sheila | 1991 | | | |
| Sheila | Tracadie-Sheila | 1991 | | | |

City of Moncton

Neighbourhoods in Moncton
| Neighbourhood | Amalgamated | Est. Pop | Landmarks |
|---|---|---|---|
| Caledonia | | | |
| Central Moncton (Old East End) | | | |
| Centennial | | | Centennial Park |
| Cherryfield | | | |
| Downtown Moncton | | | |
| Harrisville | | | |
| Humphrey | | | |
| Lakeview | | | |
| Lewisville | 1973 | | |
| Magnetic Hill | | | |
| Mapleton | | | |
| New North End | | | |
| New West End | | | |
| North-West End | | | |
| Old North End | | | |
| South End (Old West End) | | | |
| Sunny Brae | 1954 | | Sunny Brae rink |
| Sunny Brae North | | | |
| Tankville | | | |

== See also ==
- List of people from New Brunswick
- List of communities in New Brunswick
