= Moncton High School =

Moncton High School may refer to:

- Moncton High School (1898)
- Moncton High School (2015)
