= Humphrey, New Brunswick =

Community in New Brunswick, Canada

Coordinates: 46.119774°N 64.771872°W

Humphrey is a community in the Canadian province of New Brunswick, located near Moncton.

== History ==
See History of Moncton and Timeline of Moncton history

== Places of note ==
Name	Category	Notes
Forest Glen School	Education	

== See also ==
- List of neighbourhoods in Moncton
- List of neighbourhoods in New Brunswick
