= Harrisville, New Brunswick =

Community in New Brunswick, Canada

Coordinates: 46.117692°N 64.721832°W

Harrisville is a community in the Canadian province of New Brunswick, located near Moncton. It is notable for being in the vicinity of the Greater Moncton International Airport.

== History ==
See History of Moncton and Timeline of Moncton history

== Harrisville Shopping Area ==
Name	Category	Year built	Current Size (sq. ft)	Other
Kent Building Supplies	Home Renovations	2013		
Marriott Hotel	Hotel	2013		

== See also ==
- List of neighbourhoods in Moncton
- List of neighbourhoods in New Brunswick
