= Central Moncton =

Neighbourhood in Moncton, NB, Canada

Coordinates: 46.098352°N 64.796934°W

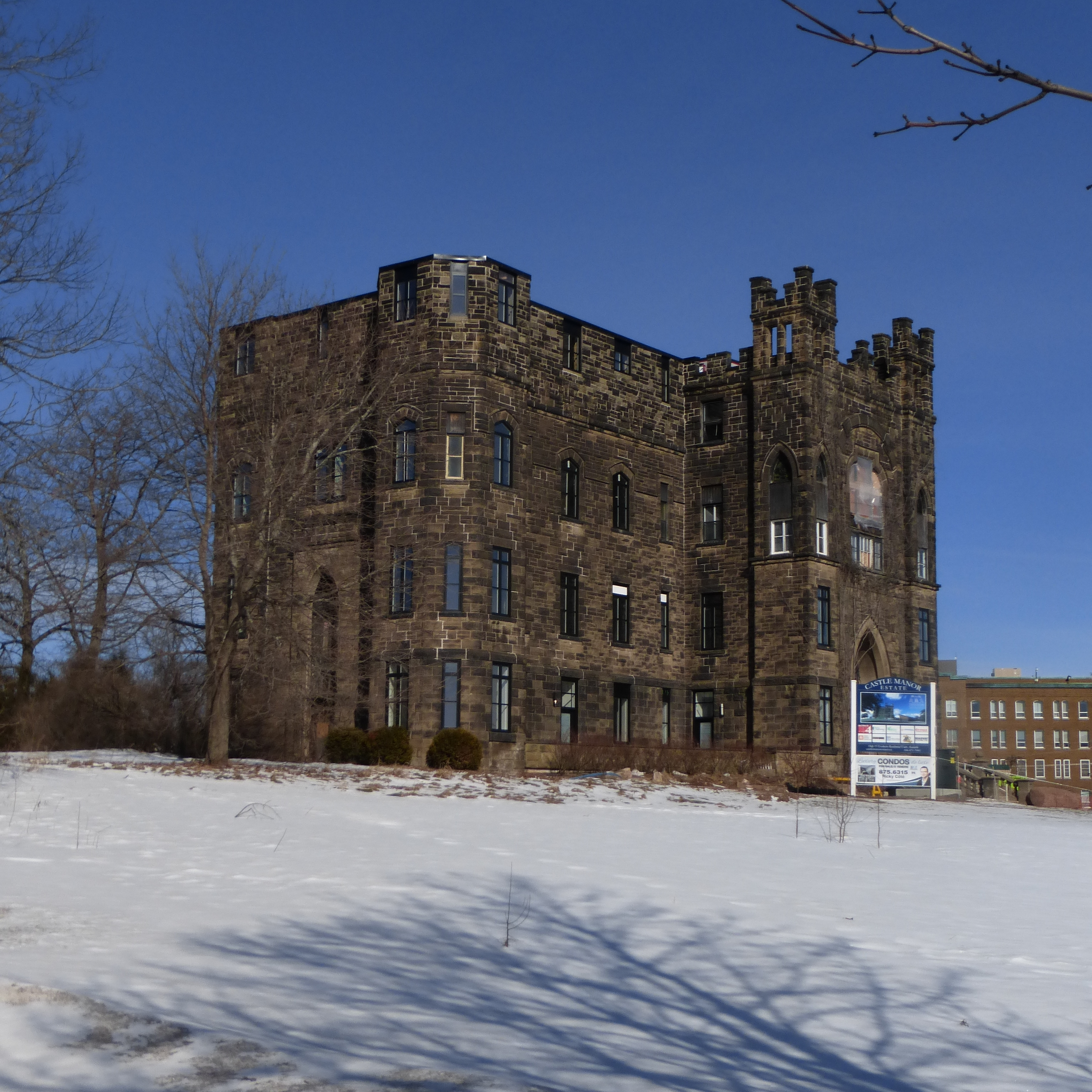
The former Alcorn Manor, designed by René-Arthur Fréchet, is a landmark in Central Moncton

Central Moncton is a neighbourhood in Moncton, New Brunswick, Canada. Its boundaries include Vaughan Harvey to the West, Connaught Ave and Wheeler Blvd to the North and Botsford Street to the East with John St and Mountain Road to the south.

== History ==
See History of Moncton and Timeline of Moncton history

== Places of note ==
Name	Category	Notes
Central Moncton Shopping Area	Shopping	(From Macbeath Avenue of Mountain Road to University/John Intersection General Area)
Kiwanis Park	Sports	
Hall's Creek Bridge	Structure	Current structure erected in 1982. First bridge to link Moncton to Leger's Corner was built in 1867.
Queen Elizabeth School	Education	
George Dumont Hospital	Healthcare	
Moncton High School (1898)	Culture	
Ecole Beausejour	Education	Francophone Junior High School from the 1960s to the 1990s
CBC/Radio-Canada	Structure	Public broadcasters radio and TV. Opened in the 1960s
Alcorn Manor	Structure	
Beausejour Gymnos Gymnastics Club	Structure	

== See also ==
- List of neighbourhoods in Moncton
