= Centennial, Moncton =

Coordinates: 46.090615°N 64.816675°W

Centennial is a neighbourhood in Moncton, New Brunswick.

== History ==
See History of Moncton and Timeline of Moncton history

== Places of note ==
| Name | Category | Notes |
|---|---|---|
| Centennial Park | Park | |
| Pacific Subdivision | Residential | (Pacific Ave, Millennium Blvd, 10th St, St George Blvd) |
| Collishaw/Millennium Blvd Industrial Park | Residential | |
| YMCA Moncton | Entertainment | |
| Bernice MacNaughton High School | Education | |
| Harrison Trimble High School | Education | |

== See also ==
- List of neighbourhoods in Moncton
