= Caledonia, New Brunswick =

Neighbourhood of Moncton, New Brunswick, Canada

Coordinates: 46.133218°N 64.748354°W

Caledonia is a neighbourhood of the city of Moncton. It is the furthest northeast neighbourhood in Greater Moncton.

== History ==
See History of Moncton and Timeline of Moncton history

== Places of note ==
Name	Category	Owner/Est Pop	Notes
Greater Moncton SPCA	Commercial		
Caledonia Industrial Park	Industrial		
Irishtown Nature Park	Government		

== See also ==
- List of neighbourhoods in Moncton
