= List of neighbourhoods in Moncton =

Moncton, New Brunswick, is made up of 19 localities (Neighbourhoods).

== Neighbourhoods ==
Neighbourhood	Amalgamated	Est. Pop	Landmarks
Caledonia			
Central Moncton (Old East End)			
Centennial			Centennial Park
Cherryfield			
Downtown Moncton			
Harrisville			
Humphrey			
Lakeview			
Lewisville	1973		
Magnetic Hill			
Mapleton			
New North End			
New West End			
North-West End			
Old North End			
South End (Old West End)			
Sunny Brae	1954		Sunny Brae rink
Sunny Brae North			
Tankville			
