= East Point Shopping =

Coordinates: 45.301617512887205°N 66.02552870170256°W

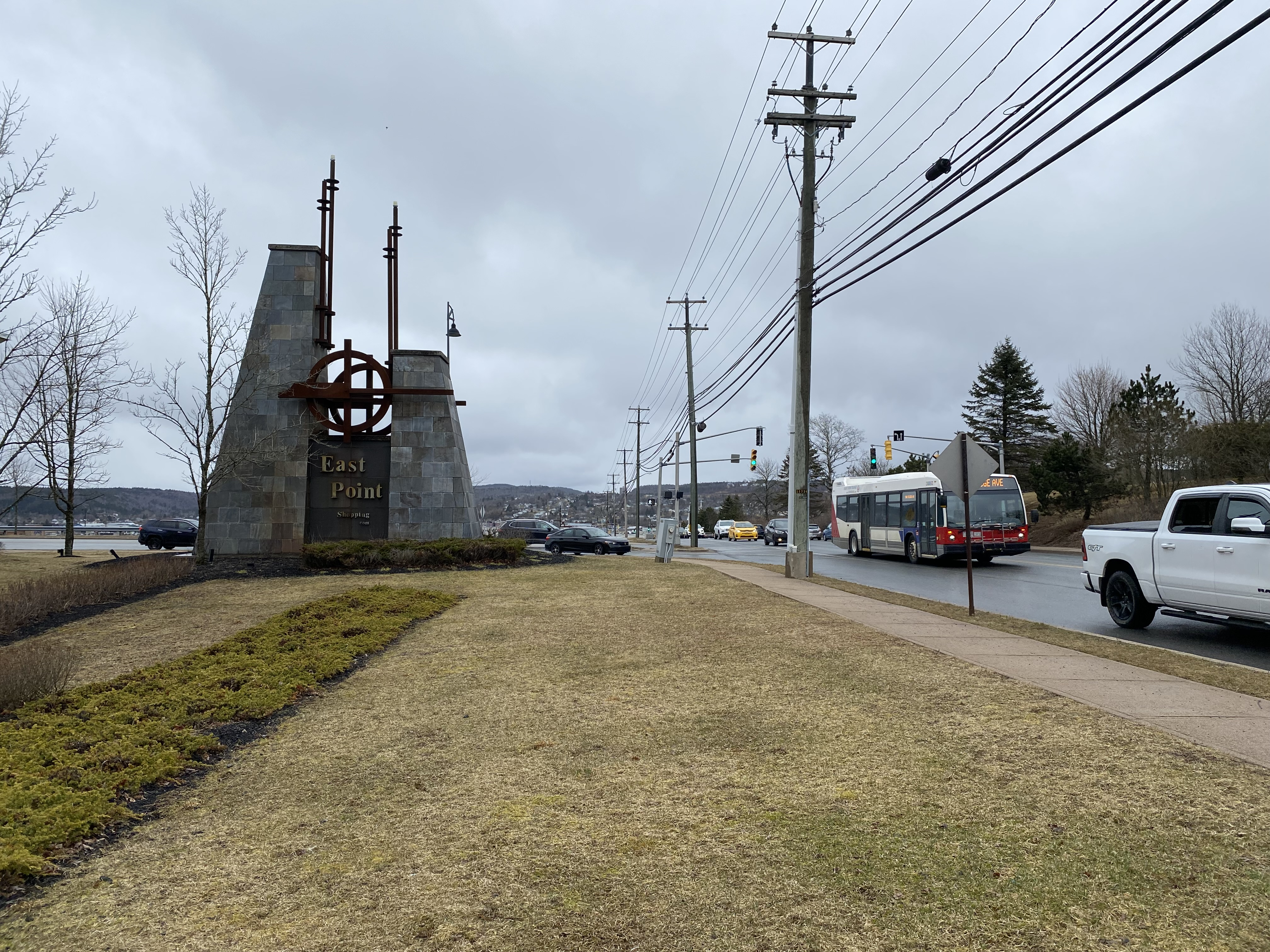
East Point Shopping sign

East Point Shopping is a shopping district located in Saint John, New Brunswick, Canada. It includes stores, restaurants, as well as various service and hotel space. Created by East Point Inc., East Point Shopping encompasses over 80 acres of development land. It is owned by Horizon Management.

In 2019, East Point Shopping proposed residential space for its first time with four new buildings containing 200 total units.

== See also ==
- List of neighbourhoods in New Brunswick
