= Climate of Moncton =

The climate of Moncton is mostly maritime, typical of most cities located in the Maritime Provinces of Canada, but the climate demonstrates strong seasonal continental influences. Despite being less than 50 km (31 mi) from the Bay of Fundy and less than 30 km (19 mi) from the Northumberland Strait, the climate can seem more continental than maritime during the summer and winter seasons, whereas maritime influences tend to temper the transitional seasons of spring and autumn.

== Seasons ==
=== Winter ===
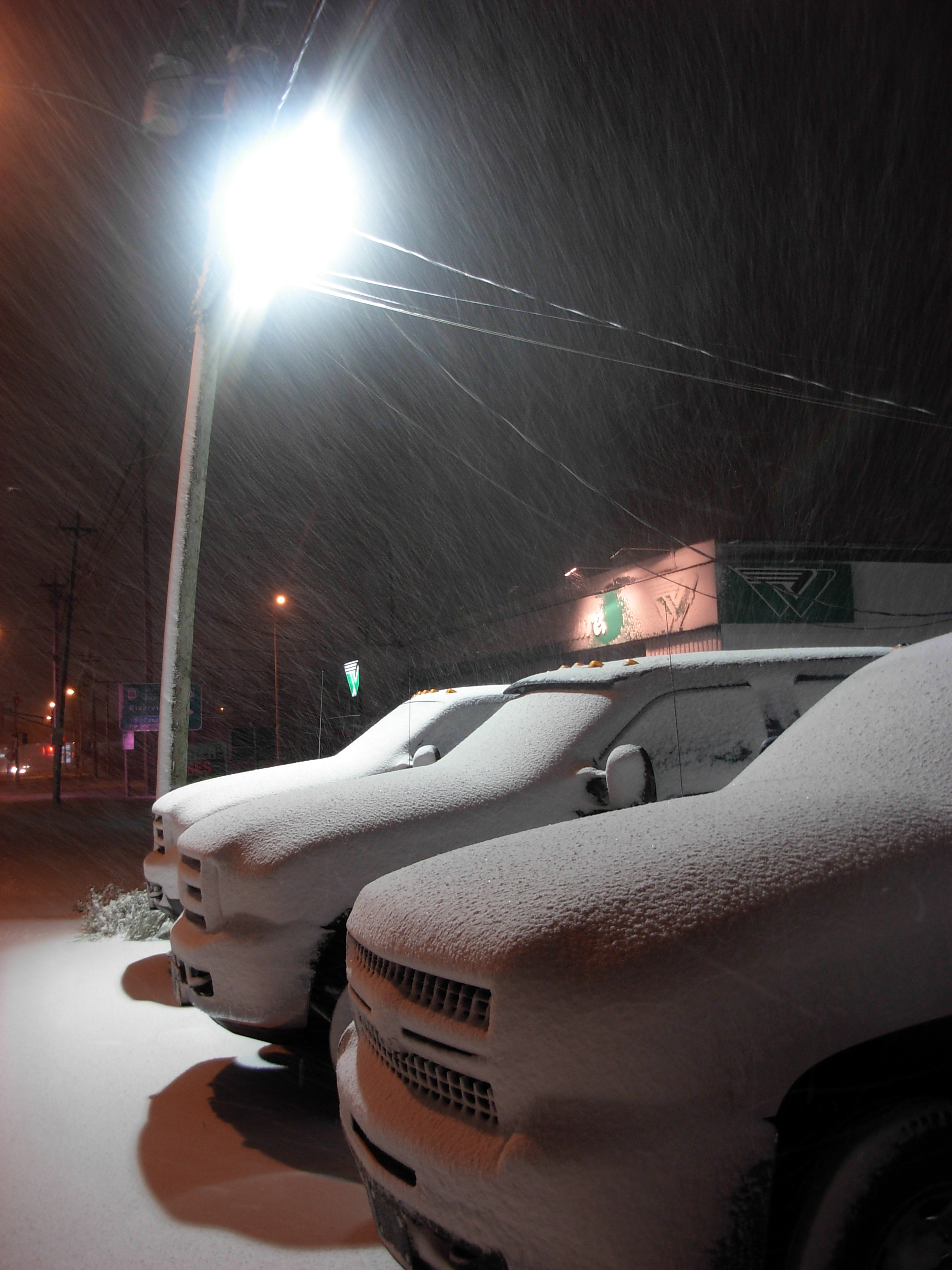
A winter scene in Moncton's north end

Winter days are cold but generally sunny with solar radiation generating some warmth. Daytime high temperatures usually range just below the freezing point. Multiple short cold snaps typically occur each winter. Temperature lows can occasionally drop into the -20s (Celsius); however, temperatures colder than -23C are very rare. Similarly, there are typically occasional "January thaws" each winter when considerable snow melt can occur. Major snowfalls can result from nor'easter ocean storms moving up the east coast of North America, following the jet stream from the southeastern United States. Large amounts of precipitation can result from the counterclockwise rotation of these storms picking up moisture from the Atlantic Ocean and dumping it on southeastern New Brunswick as the storms pass by to the south and east of the region. This can be amplified locally by "sea effect" snow squall activity due to northeasterly winds passing over the nearby Gulf of St. Lawrence on the trailing edge of the storm. In February 1992, a nor'Easter lasted for two days and dropped 162 cm (65 inches) of snow on the Moncton area. That record was not beaten until Winter of 2015. Major snowfalls more typically average 20–30 cm (8–12 in) and are frequently mixed with rain or freezing rain.

=== Spring ===
Spring is frequently delayed because the sea ice that forms in the nearby Gulf of St. Lawrence during the previous winter requires time to melt and this cools the prevailing onshore winds. The ice burden in the gulf however has diminished considerably over the course of the last decade, which may be a consequence of global warming. The springtime cooling effect has subsequently weakened. Daytime temperatures above freezing are typical by mid March. Trees are usually in full leaf in May.

=== Summer ===
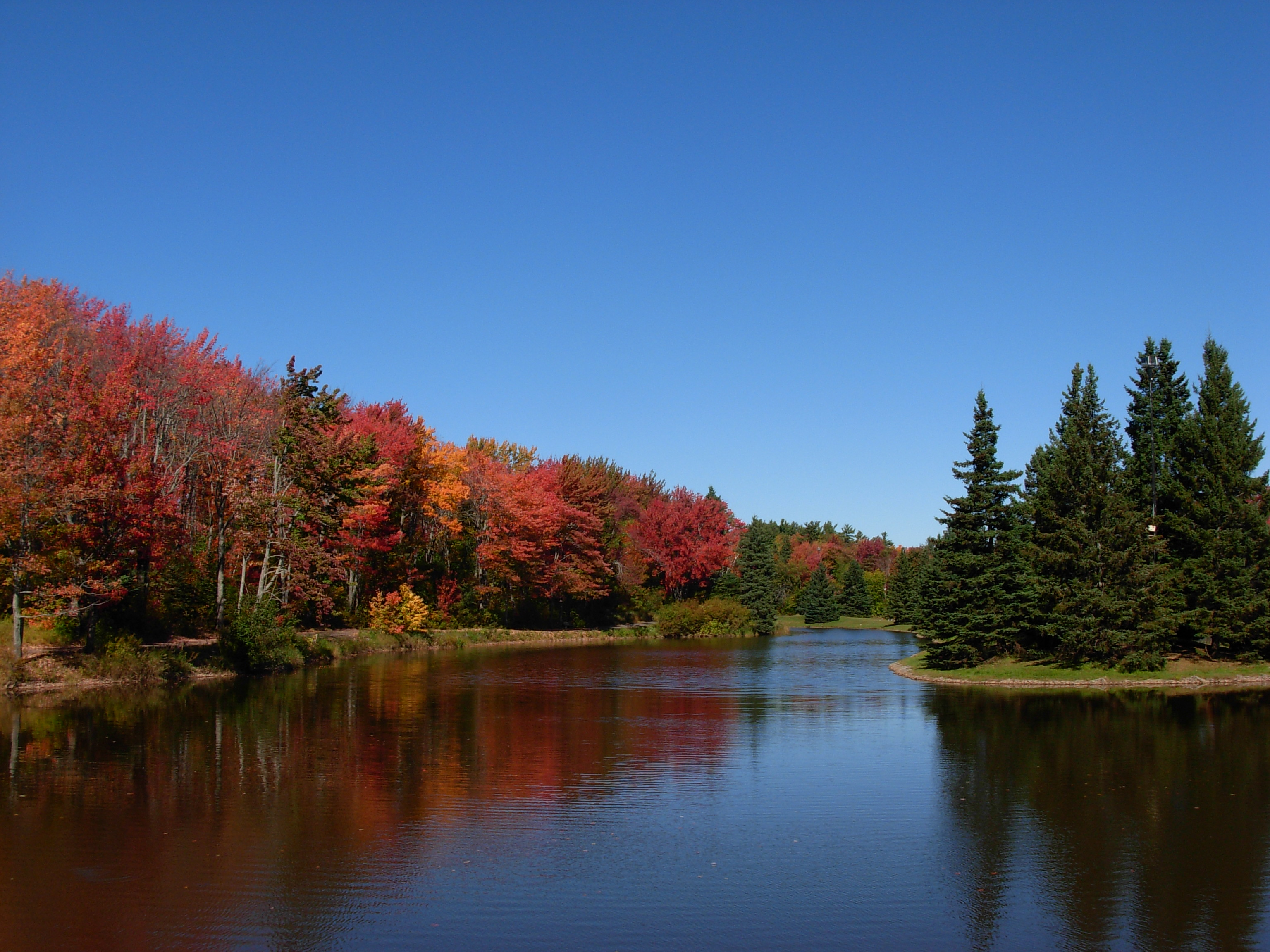
An autumn scene in Moncton's Centennial Park

Summers are warm, with occasional hot days, and may be humid due to the seasonal prevailing westerly winds strengthening the continental tendencies of the local climate. Daytime highs average around 25 °C (77 °F) but exceed 30 °C (86 °F) on occasion. Rainfall is generally moderate, but can fluctuate from year to year. Occasional droughts can occur, typically in late July or August.

=== Autumn ===
Autumn is influenced by the retention of heat in the nearby Gulf of St. Lawrence and daytime temperatures remain mild through October. First snowfalls usually do not occur until mid to late November and consistent snow cover on the ground does not typically happen until mid to late December. The Fundy coast of New Brunswick occasionally experiences the effects of post-tropical storms.

The stormiest weather of the year, with the greatest precipitation and the strongest winds, usually occur during the fall/winter transition (mid December to mid January).

== Statistics ==
Climate data for Moncton (1981−2010)
Month	Jan	Feb	Mar	Apr	May	Jun	Jul	Aug	Sep	Oct	Nov	Dec	Year
Record high humidex	18.2	15.8	17.5	30.0	37.6	40.6	43.5	44.5	40.9	32.5	28.2	20.3	44.5
Record high °C (°F)	16.1 (61.0)	15.3 (59.5)	18.9 (66.0)	28.5 (83.3)	34.2 (93.6)	34.4 (93.9)	35.6 (96.1)	37.2 (99.0)	33.3 (91.9)	26.3 (79.3)	22.9 (73.2)	17.8 (64.0)	37.2 (99.0)
Mean daily maximum °C (°F)	−3.7 (25.3)	−2.4 (27.7)	2.0 (35.6)	8.5 (47.3)	16.0 (60.8)	21.2 (70.2)	24.7 (76.5)	24.0 (75.2)	19.5 (67.1)	12.8 (55.0)	6.1 (43.0)	−0.2 (31.6)	10.7 (51.3)
Daily mean °C (°F)	−8.9 (16.0)	−7.6 (18.3)	−2.9 (26.8)	3.5 (38.3)	10.0 (50.0)	15.2 (59.4)	18.8 (65.8)	18.2 (64.8)	13.6 (56.5)	7.6 (45.7)	1.9 (35.4)	−4.8 (23.4)	5.4 (41.7)
Mean daily minimum °C (°F)	−14 (7)	−12.7 (9.1)	−7.8 (18.0)	−1.4 (29.5)	4.0 (39.2)	9.1 (48.4)	12.9 (55.2)	12.2 (54.0)	7.7 (45.9)	2.3 (36.1)	−2.4 (27.7)	−9.4 (15.1)	0.1 (32.2)
Record low °C (°F)	−32.2 (−26.0)	−31.7 (−25.1)	−27.4 (−17.3)	−16.1 (3.0)	−6.1 (21.0)	−2.1 (28.2)	1.2 (34.2)	0.6 (33.1)	−3.3 (26.1)	−10 (14)	−17.4 (0.7)	−29 (−20)	−32.2 (−26.0)
Record low wind chill	−49.4	−46.0	−39.3	−27.7	−12.6	−4.9	0.0	0.0	−9.0	−14.7	−27.1	−43.5	−49.4
Average precipitation mm (inches)	103.3 (4.07)	90.9 (3.58)	115.6 (4.55)	97.6 (3.84)	96.9 (3.81)	94.6 (3.72)	92.1 (3.63)	80.8 (3.18)	93.5 (3.68)	113.4 (4.46)	107.2 (4.22)	114.4 (4.50)	1,200.4 (47.26)
Average rainfall mm (inches)	28.8 (1.13)	28.4 (1.12)	49.2 (1.94)	62.3 (2.45)	92.5 (3.64)	94.6 (3.72)	92.1 (3.63)	80.8 (3.18)	93.5 (3.68)	112.1 (4.41)	87.3 (3.44)	54.2 (2.13)	875.7 (34.48)
Average snowfall cm (inches)	78.1 (30.7)	64.7 (25.5)	64.5 (25.4)	31.2 (12.3)	3.8 (1.5)	0.0 (0.0)	0.0 (0.0)	0.0 (0.0)	0.0 (0.0)	1.2 (0.5)	19.4 (7.6)	62.4 (24.6)	325.3 (128.1)
Average precipitation days (≥ 0.2 mm)	16.6	13.7	14.7	15.3	15.6	15.1	14.1	12.2	11.7	13.8	16.0	16.5	175.5
Average rainy days (≥ 0.2 mm)	5.9	4.8	7.7	12.3	15.4	15.1	14.1	12.2	11.7	13.7	12.9	8.1	134.0
Average snowy days (≥ 0.2 cm)	14.2	12.0	10.9	6.5	0.90	0.0	0.0	0.0	0.0	0.41	5.5	12.3	62.7
Mean monthly sunshine hours	116.2	124.3	139.9	165.6	207.5	232.8	256.3	241.1	173.3	149.4	95.1	101.1	2,002.2
Percentage possible sunshine	41.3	42.7	37.9	40.8	44.8	49.4	53.8	55.0	45.9	44.0	33.4	37.5	43.9
Source: Environment Canada
