= Cherryfield =

Cherryfield may refer to:

- Cherryfield, Maine, United States
- Cherryfield, New Brunswick, Canada
- Cherryfield, Nova Scotia, Canada
