= Purple Knights =

Purple Knights may refer to:

- Bridgeport Purple Knights, athletic teams that represent the University of Bridgeport, in Bridgeport, Connecticut, U.S.
- Saint Michael's Purple Knights, athletic teams that represent Saint Michael's College, in Colchester, Vermont, U.S.
- Purple Knights, athletic teams that represent Moncton High School, in Moncton, New Brunswick, Canada
- Purple Knights, athletic teams that represent Beloit Memorial High School, in Beloit, Wisconsin, U.S.
