= Mapleton Park, New Brunswick =

Park in Moncton, New Brunswick, Canada

Mapleton Park
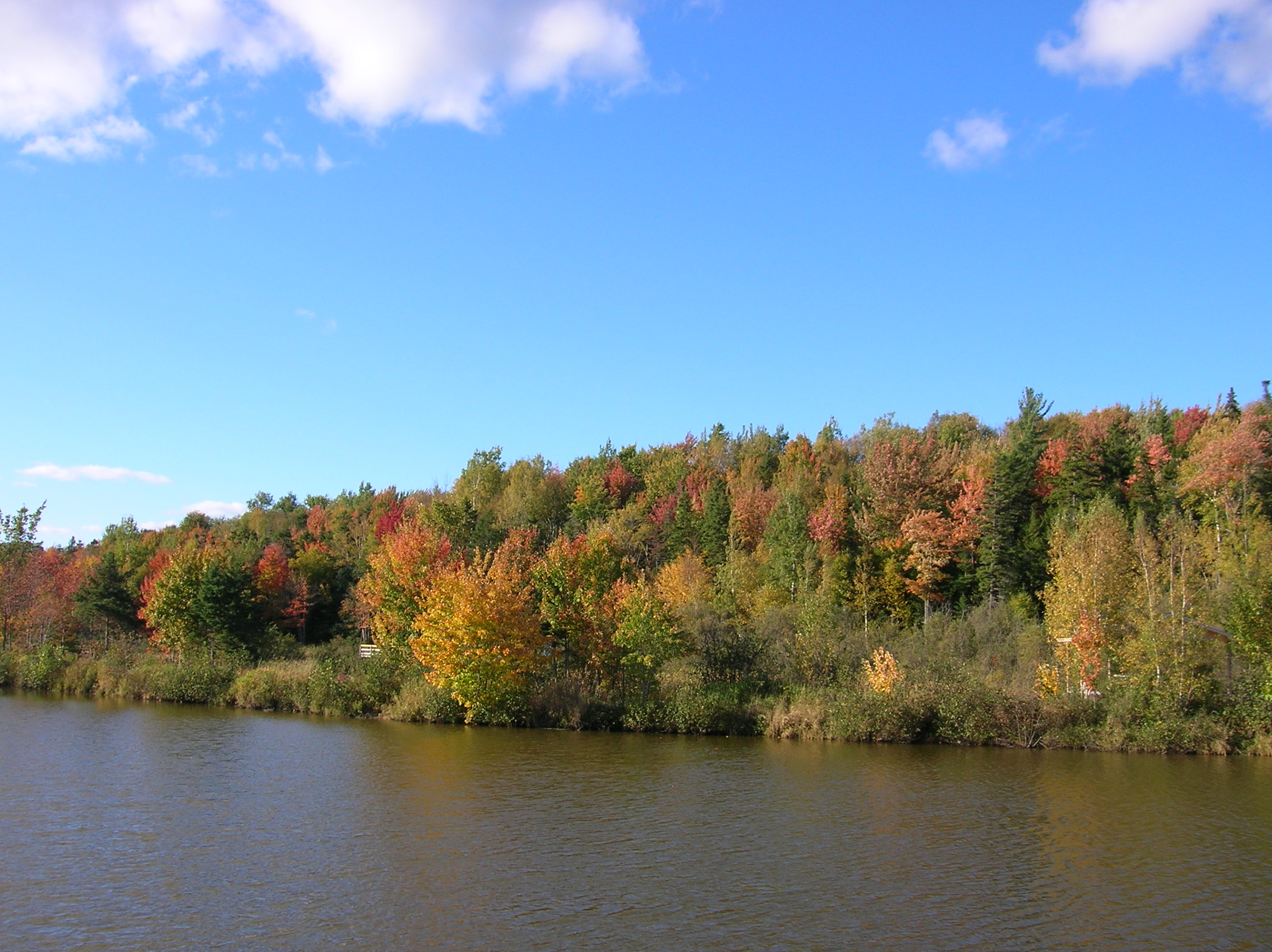
- Mapleton Park in autumn
- Interactive map of Mapleton Park
- Type: Urban park
- Location: Moncton, New Brunswick
- Coordinates: 46.127°N 64.844°W
- Area: 300 acres (120 ha)
- Operator: City of Moncton
- Status: Open all year

Mapleton Park is an urban nature park located in Moncton, New Brunswick, Canada. It is located in the rapidly growing northwest part of the city adjacent to the Trans Canada Highway and measures 1.21 km^{2} in area.

== Places of note ==
- Mapleton Rotary Lodge
- Skating Pond
- Hiking Trails

== See also ==
- Centennial Park
- Irishtown Nature Park
- Moncton Urban Parks
