= Mapleton, Moncton =

Neighborhood in New Brunswick, Canada

Mapleton
- Neighbourhood
- Interactive map of Mapleton
- Country: Canada
- Province/State: New Brunswick
- City: Moncton

Mapleton is a Moncton Neighbourhood (former community) located in Moncton, New Brunswick. The community is situated in the Northern area of the city of Moncton. Mapleton is located mainly around the intersection of Route 2 exit 454 and Mapleton Road extending south past Route 15 to the intersection of Route 126. Mapleton is a mix between commercial, park, and residential area.

== Places of note ==
Name	Category	Owner/Est Pop	Notes
Mapleton Shopping Area	Shopping		
Valhala Estates Subdivision	Residential		
Crandall University	Education		
Mapleton Park	Park		

== See also ==
- List of neighbourhoods in Moncton
- List of tallest buildings in Moncton
