= Tankville =

Coordinates: 46.148919°N 64.792042°W

Tankville is a neighbourhood in the city of Moncton. Tankville was officially amalgamated with Moncton in 1973.

== History ==
See History of Moncton and Timeline of Moncton history

== Places of note ==
Name	Category	Owner/Est Pop	Notes
Royal Oaks	Residential		
Royal Oaks Golf Club	Golf Course		
Pinetree Mini Homes	Residential		
Tankville Museum	Culture	City of Moncton	
Moncton High School	Education		
Moncton/McEwen Aerodrome	Airport		
