= René-Arthur Fréchet =

Canadian architect, 1879–1950

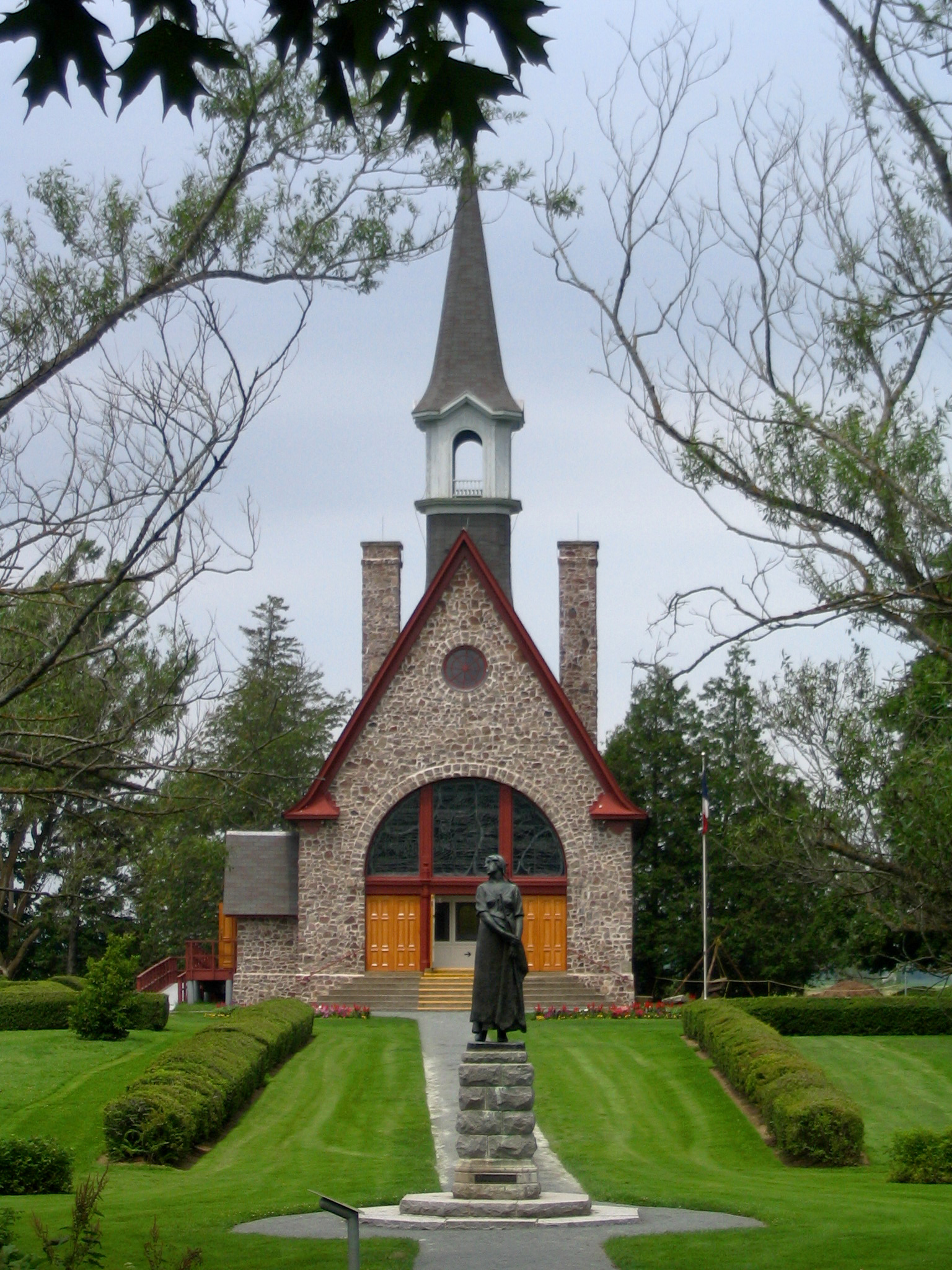
- Memorial Church in Grand Pré (1910)
- Born: June 6, 1879; Montreal, Quebec
- Died: May 28, 1950 (aged 70); Moncton, New Brunswick
- Education: Laval University
- Occupation: Architect
- Practice: Religious and domestic
- Buildings: Memorial Church in Grand Pré (1910)
- Projects: Numerous churches in New Brunswick and Nova Scotia, Capitol Theatre, Moncton

René-Arthur Fréchet (June 6, 1879 – May 28, 1950) was a Canadian architect who was active in New Brunswick and Nova Scotia, modern day Acadia. He designed many churches and public buildings, a number of which are now protected for their architectural significance.

== Life ==
Born in Montreal, Quebec, Fréchet obtained a degree in architecture from Laval University in 1898 and the same year he obtained a job with the Intercolonial Railway as an architect. Two years later, in 1900, he moved to Moncton, New Brunswick, for the railway, and resided at the Minto Hotel. In 1905, he opened his own architecture firm, developing a specialty in religious and domestic architecture. However, he was not limited to these architectural fields. Notably, he designed the Capitol Theatre in Moncton in the mid-1920s.

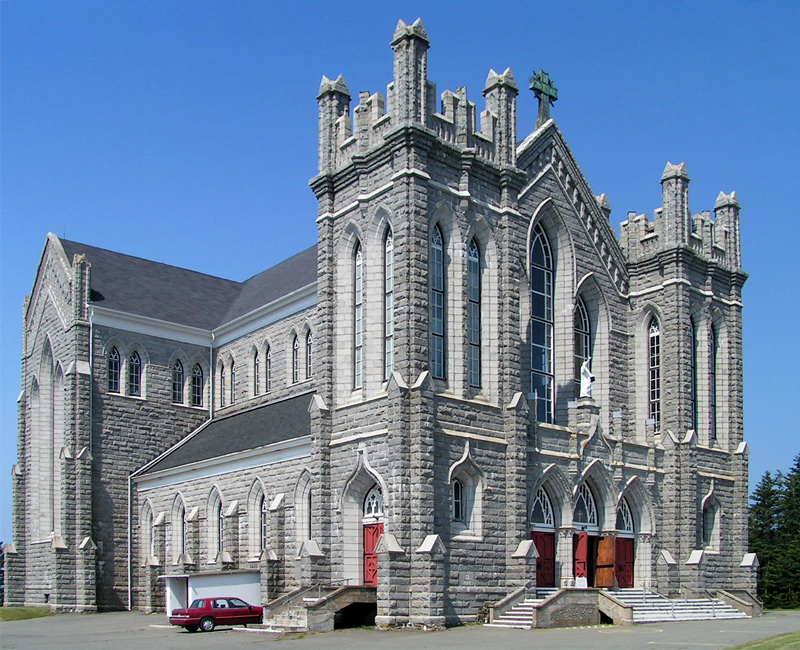
St. Bernard Church (1910)

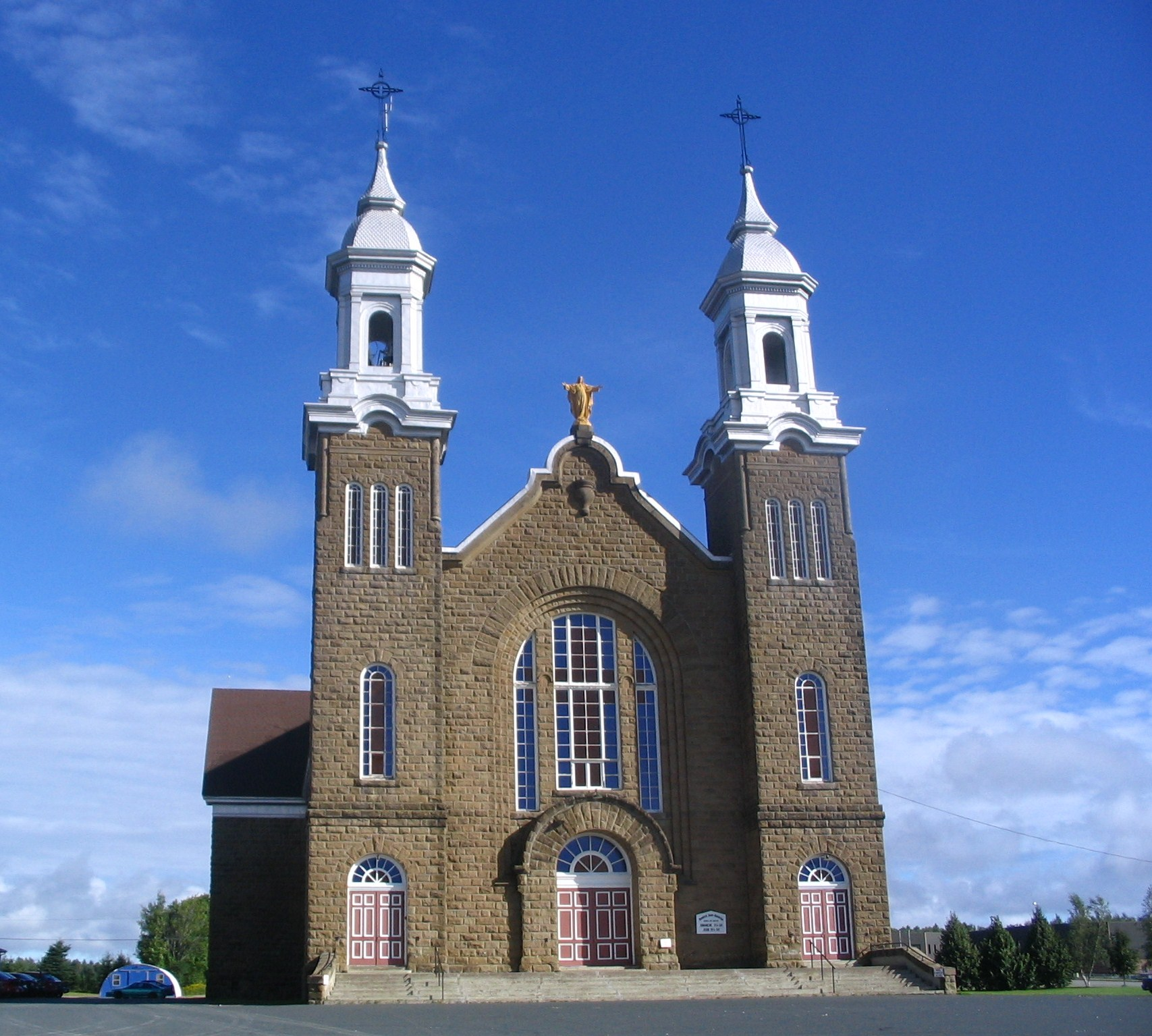
Paquetville Church (1914)

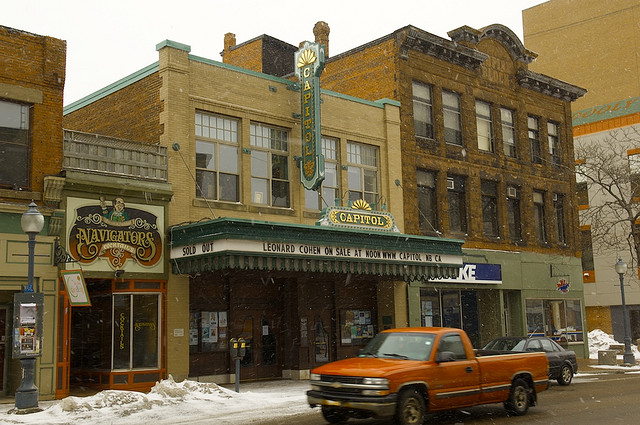
Capitol Theatre, Moncton (1926)

Fréchet became involved in the Acadian community. In 1903, he married Elvina Cormier, daughter of local merchant Simon Cormier. Fréchet was a member of the provisional management team for the French-language Acadian newspaper L'Évangéline, a founding member of the revitalized newspaper (1920s, see Valentin Landry), a city councillor for Moncton City Council for several years, and a member of Société Nationale l'Assomption.

René-Arthur Fréchet died on May 28, 1950, in Moncton. Two days later, Émery Leblanc published a letter in L'Évangéline in memory of Frechet, highlighting his accomplishments.

== Works ==
In Moncton:

- Mary's Home, Mountain Road
- Provincial Bank of Canada, Main Street (1909)
- Brunswick Hotel, Main Street (now Crowne Plaza, significantly altered)
- Capitol Theatre, Main Street
- Academy of the Sacred Heart
- St. Bernard's Roman Catholic Church, Botsford Street
- Hôtel-Dieu and nurse's residence, Providence Street, now partly obscured
- Good Shepherd Sisters Building (now the Léopold-Taillon Building, University of Moncton)

Elsewhere in New Brunswick:

- Saint-Antoine l'Ermite Church, Champdoré
- St. Joseph's Church, Shediac
- Léger Pharmacy, Shediac (1912)
- Church of St. Francis Xavier, Charlo
- 21 Gray Street, Fredericton (1919)
- John Peck House, Hillsborough (1919)
- Creaghan Building, Miramichi (1924)
- Church of St. John the Baptist and St. Joseph, Tracadie (1925)
- Bourgeois House, Tracadie (1938)
- Government of Canada Building, North Head (1939)

In Nova Scotia

- Memorial Church, Grand-Pré National Historic Site
- St. Bernard Church, St. Bernard, Nova Scotia

== Legacy ==
In 2012, a park in the Sunny Brae neighbourhood of Moncton was named to recognize the legacy of René-Arthur-Fréchet. Fréchet had been virtually forgotten at the time of the park's naming, and in 2016 residents petitioned to have it given another name. The publicity revitalized his memory.
