= Timeline of Moncton history =

This is a timeline of the history of Moncton.

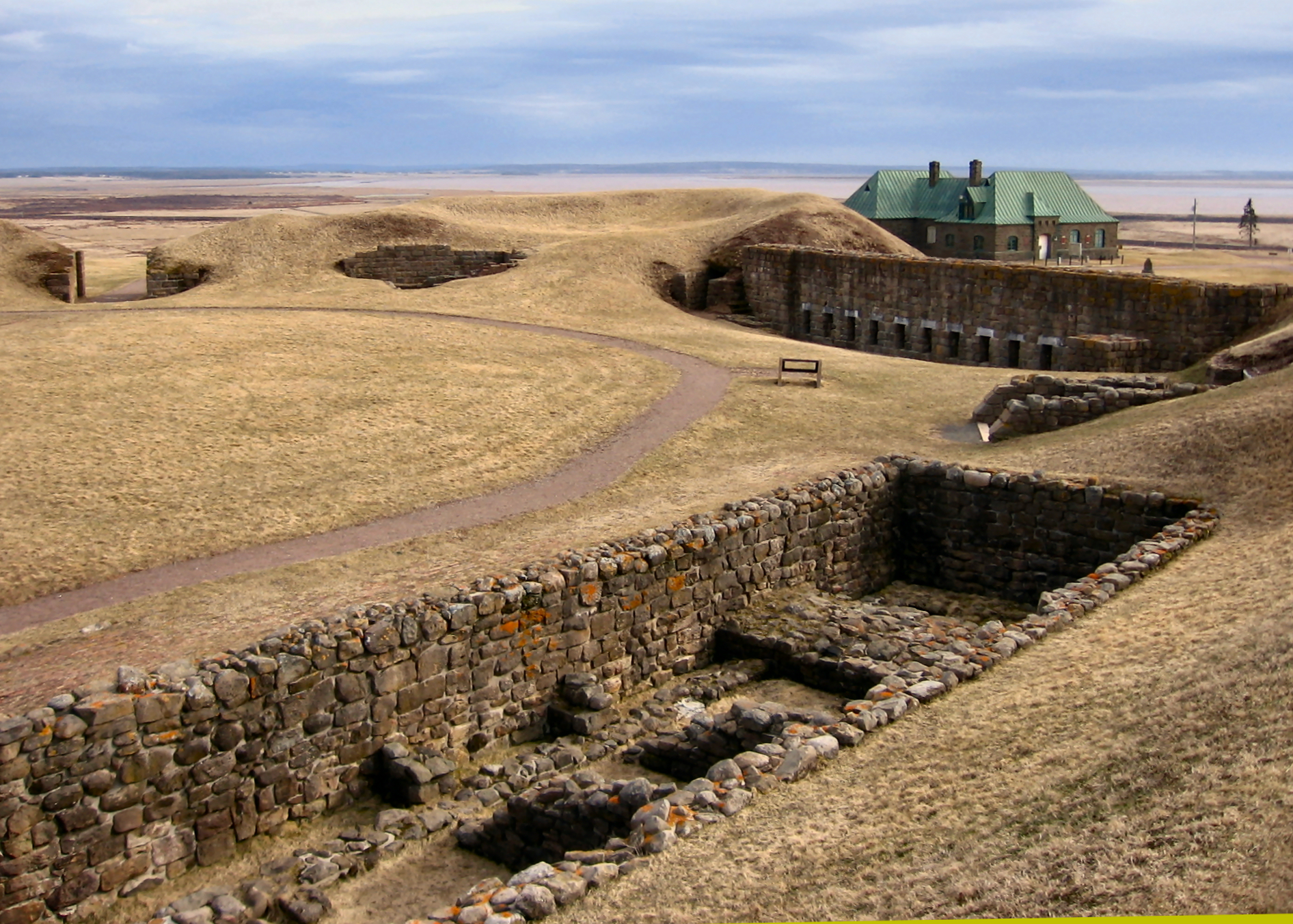
Fort Beausejour in 2006

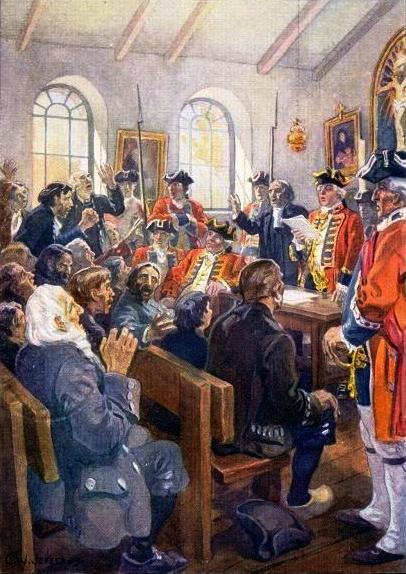
The Deportation of the Acadians had a significant impact on the history of Moncton

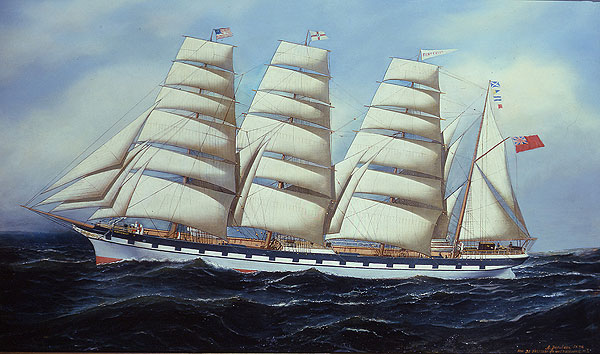
Wooden Shipbuilding was responsible for the initial growth of the community

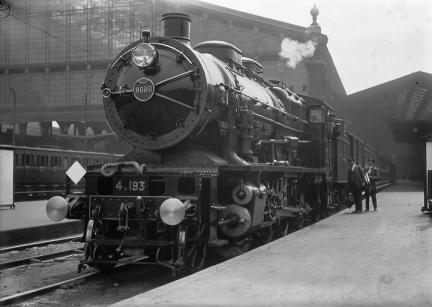
The rail industry re-energized the community after the collapse of the shipbuilding industry

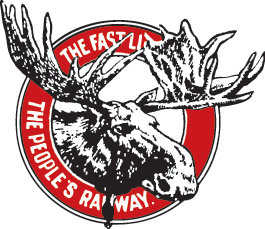
The Intercolonial Railway was headquartered in Moncton

Moncton has become the transportation hub of the Maritimes

== Aboriginal period ==
- The original aboriginal inhabitants of the Petitcodiac River valley were the Mi'kmaq. Moncton is situated at the southern end of a traditional native portage route between the Petitcodiac River and Shediac Bay on the nearby Northumberland Strait.

== 17th century ==
- 1670s – Chignecto settlement at the head of the Bay of Fundy established by the Acadian people.
- 1686 – The earliest reference to the "Petcoucoyer River" on the de Meulles Map.
- 1700 – Chipodie Acadian settlement established at the mouth of the Petitcodiac River.

== 18th century ==
- 1733 – Community of "Le Coude" (The Elbow) established near Halls Creek, at site of present-day Moncton.
- 1751 – Fort Beauséjour at Aulac is built by France in response to the British construction of nearby Fort Lawrence.
- 1755 – British forces under the command of Lieutenant Colonel Robert Monckton take Fort Beausejour and rename it Fort Cumberland.
- 1755 – Expulsion of the Acadian people, including from the Petitcodiac River valley. Some Acadians escape into the woods and begin to conduct a resistance campaign against the British.
- 1758 – Battle of Stoney Creek, end of the Acadian resistance.
- 1761 – English Tantramar Township established.
- 1766 – Captain John Hall arrives from Pennsylvania with a land grant from the Philadelphia Land Company and establishes Monckton Township with eight immigrant "Deutsch" families. The community is named "The Bend of the Petitcodiac".
- 1780s – Acadians begin to return from exile and resettle in New Brunswick.

== 19th century ==
- 1810s – Wooden shipbuilding industry begins to become an important factor in the local economy.
- 1836 – Regular stage coach and mail service starts, connecting Halifax, Monckton Township and Saint John.
- 1855 – "The Bend" is incorporated as the town of "Moncton"; misspelling is due to a clerical error. The first mayor of the new town is the shipbuilder Joseph Salter.
- 1857 – The European and North American Railway opens its line between Moncton and Shediac.
- 1859 – E&NA RR opens second line between Moncton and Saint John.
- 1860s – Wooden shipbuilding industry collapses. Westmorland Bank falls into bankruptcy. Severe economic recession occurs in Moncton.
- 1862 – Moncton loses its incorporated status.
- 1868 – Times & Transcript founded.
- 1869 - Hurricane Saxby Gale caused extensive damage to the city including the Gunningsville Bridge.
- 1871 – Moncton selected to be the headquarters of the Intercolonial Railway of Canada.
- 1875 – Moncton able to reincorporate with the motto "Resurgo" (I rise again).
- 1890 – Moncton achieves city status.

== 20th century ==
- 1906 – Massive fire destroys ICR shops. City successfully lobbies federal government to have the shops rebuilt, preserving the local railway industry.
- 1912 – Moncton selected as the eastern terminus of the National Transcontinental Railway.
- 1913 – Moncton Public Library opened.
- 1918 – ICR and NTR merge, forming the Canadian National Railway. Moncton becomes headquarters of the CNR Maritime division.
- 1920 – Eaton's catalogue warehouse opens in Moncton.
- 1922 – "CNRA", Moncton's first radio station, goes on the air.
- 1926 – The Capitol Theatre opens.
- 1928 – Moncton Airport established, first commercial air traffic into and out of the city.
- 1929 – Moncton Flight College established.
- 1930 - Al G. Barnes Circus Train Wreck near Moncton.
- 1934 - CKCW-AM radio goes on the air.
- 1935 - Georgetown and Parkton Amalgamated with Moncton and became neighbourhoods.
- 1935 – Moncton High School founded.
- 1936 - The last hanging in New Brunswick.
- 1940 – CFB Moncton is established as the main military supply base in Atlantic Canada.
- 1954 – Moncton's first TV station, CKCW-TV goes on the air.
- 1959 – Dieppe Commandos founded.
- 1963 – Université de Moncton is founded.
- 1968 – The Petitcodiac River causeway is built.
- 1970s – Social unrest as Acadians become politically assertive over minority rights.
- 1973 - Lewisville and Tankville Amalgamated with Moncton.
- 1974 – Moncton Museum established.
- 1980s – Severe economic recession occurs due to several major employers terminating operations in the city, including the Eaton's catalogue division, the CNR shops and CFB Moncton.
- 1981 – Codiac Transit (now Codiac Transpo) founded.
- 1984 – Pope John Paul II visits Moncton and stages papal mass for 75,000 celebrants.
- 1990s – "Moncton Miracle" occurs as the economy restructures with a shift towards information technology and call centres, as well as a refocussing upon the retail, distribution, transportation and light manufacturing sectors.
- 1990 – Crystal Palace Amusement Park opened.
- 1996 – The Wildcats of the QMJHL are established.
- Atlantic Baptist University relocates to a new campus and achieves full university designation.
- 1997—Moncton disbands its municipal police force and acquires a contract with the RCMP.
- 1999 – Moncton hosts the Francophonie Summit with the heads of state from 54 nations attending the conference.

== 21st century ==
- 2001 – North American airspace is closed following the World Trade Center attacks; ten international flights are diverted to Moncton.
- 2002 – Moncton becomes Canada's first officially bilingual city.
- 2002 – The Moncton Airport achieves International designation.
- 2005 – New Gunningsville Bridge opened.
- 2006 – Metro Moncton becomes the largest population centre in New Brunswick.
- 2008 – Moncton 2010 Stadium broke ground.
- 2014 – Three Royal Canadian Mounted Police officers were killed and two others injured in a shooting spree committed by 24-year-old resident Justin Bourque.
- 2014 – Crystal Palace amusement park closed to make way for Bass Pro Shops.
- 2015 – 2015 FIFA Women's World Cup.
- 2018 – The Avenir Centre, moncton's newest downtown events centre, and new home of the Wildcats and the Magic (NBL Canada), opened its doors on September 8.
- 2020 – COVID-19 pandemic in New Brunswick.

== See also ==
- History of Moncton
- Petitcodiac Riverkeeper
