= Lakeview, New Brunswick =

Neighbourhood in New Brunswick

Lakeview
- Neighborhood
- Interactive map of Lakeview
- Coordinates: 46°4′N 64°50′W
- Country: Canada
- Province: New Brunswick
- City: Moncton
- Time zone: UTC-4 (AST)
  - Summer (DST): UTC-3 (ADT)
- Area code: 506

Lakeview is a Neighborhood in Moncton, New Brunswick which borders New West End and the community of Allison, New Brunswick.

== Places of note ==
| Name | Category | Owner/Est Pop | Notes |
|---|---|---|---|
| White Frost Mini Home Park | Residential | | |
| Woodlawn Subdivision | Residential | | |
| Uplands School | Education | | |

== See also ==
- List of neighbourhoods in Moncton
- List of neighbourhoods in New Brunswick
