= Lewisville, New Brunswick =

Coordinates: 46.107339°N 64.76037°W

Lewisville is a neighbourhood in the city of Moncton, New Brunswick.

== History ==
- Alanson Lewis came to Moncton with his wife Mary Merritt and their entire family in the spring of 1783 from Poughkeepsie, NY, as displaced Loyalists following the American Revolution.
- James Lewis and Sevil Lewis settled here in 1866. In 1898 Lewisville had a population of 200.
- Lewisville was officially amalgamated into the city of Moncton in 1973.

== See also ==
- List of neighbourhoods in Moncton
- List of neighbourhoods in New Brunswick
