= North-West End, Moncton =

Coordinates: 46.116978°N 64.890747°W

North West End is a neighbourhood in Moncton, New Brunswick. The northwest end is bordered with New Brunswick Route 2 to both the north and west, Ryan St and Horseman Rd to the east, and Route 128 to the south. This area extends beyond the border of Moncton into part of Berry Mills.

== History ==
This is an amalgamation of smaller neighbourhoods and subdivisions which include the following below.

- In 2014, the neighbourhood was placed in lockdown during the Moncton shooting.

== Places of note ==
Name	Category	Owner/Est Pop	Notes
Mount Zion Presbyterian Church	Religious		
Northrop Frye School	Education		
Crystal Springs Subdivision	Residential		
