= Sunny Brae, New Brunswick =

Neighbourhood in Moncton, New Brunswick

Coordinates: 46.106327°N 64.782515°W

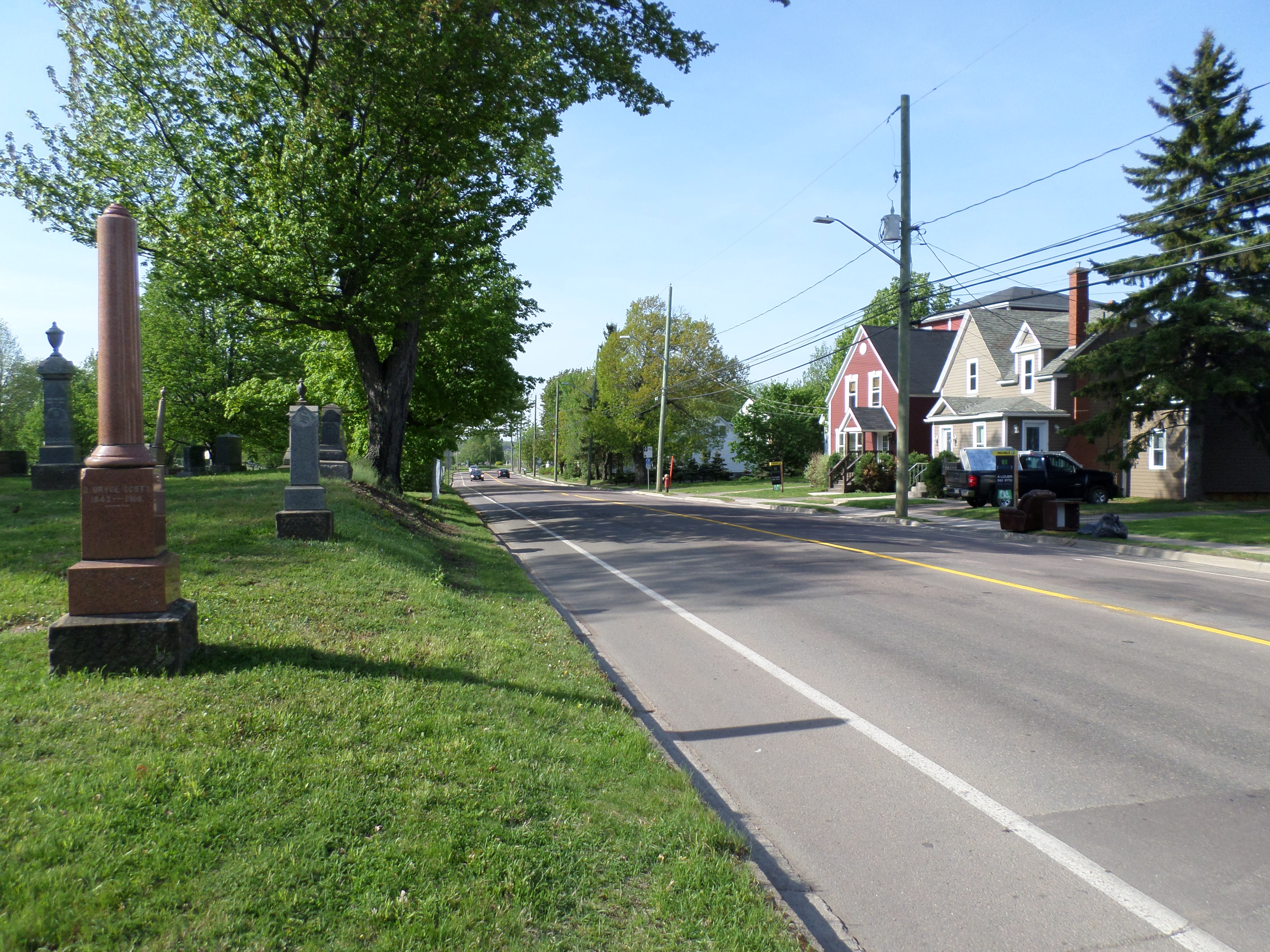
Looking north on Elmwood Drive with Elmwood cemetery located in Humphreys on left. Sunny Brae on left side of road. To the right is Sunny Acres.

Sunny Brae is a neighbourhood in Moncton, New Brunswick.

== History ==
Federal census population history of Sunny Brae
Year	Pop.	±%
1921	1,171	—
1931	1,364	+16.5%
1941	1,368	+0.3%
1951	2,048	+49.7%
Source: Statistics Canada

In 1867, Sunny Brae existed as farm land with perhaps as few as two houses in the area. One of the earliest settlers in Sunny Brae was Alexander Wright who came from Scotland and it was suggested that he gave it the name "Sunny Brae". In the 1870s, Rev. Stephen Humphrey owned most of the farmland and it was subdivided into lots known as the Russell survey. The lots were gradually taken up by settlers. A church bearing the Humphrey name currently serves the area, and has for many decades.

In 1904, Sunny Brae was a community with a post office, two stores and a population of 200.

Sunny Brae was incorporated as a town from 1915 to 1954, when it amalgamated with the city of Moncton. It now exists as a neighbourhood, with no markings to suggest its name or borders.

The neighbourhood is served by the bus line 61 Elmwood of Codiac Transpo.

Today Sunny Brae is among the oldest established neighbourhoods in the city. Located within it is a middle school bearing its name, which was founded in the late 1950s.
