= Capitol Theatre (Moncton) =

Theatre in Moncton, New Brunswick, Canada

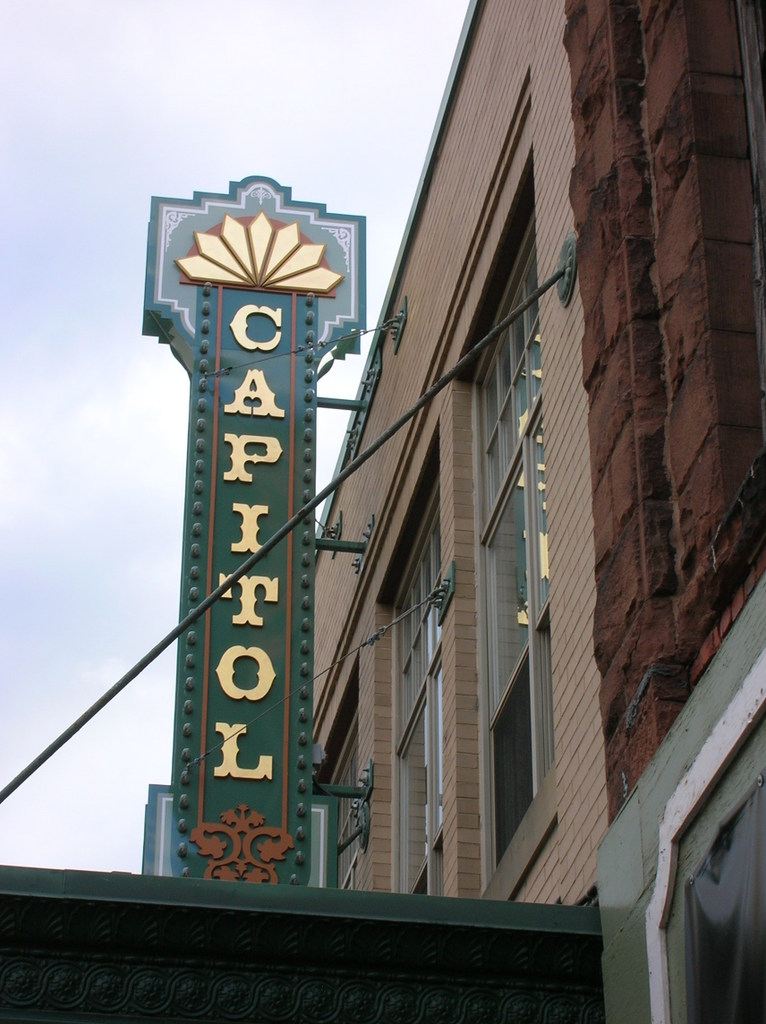
- The Capitol Theatre
- Interactive map of Capitol Theatre
- Location: 811 Main Street; Moncton, New Brunswick; E1C 1G1
- Coordinates: 46.08825°N 64.779068°W
- Capacity: 800

Construction
- Opened: 1922
- Rebuilt: 1993

Website
- www.capitol.nb.ca

The Capitol Theatre (French: Théâtre Capitol) in downtown Moncton, New Brunswick, Canada, is a restored 1920s-era vaudeville house, now home to several venues and serving as the centre for cultural entertainment for the city.

== History and Heritage Value ==
The Capitol Theatre Main Hall is an Italianate opera house-style auditorium adjoined by the Empress Theatre, a smaller auditorium venue on the second level at the rear. The Capitol Theatre also houses an art gallery.

The Capitol Theatre was designed in 1920 by architect René-Arthur Fréchet with Romanesque décor by the theatre designer Emmanual Briffa. It was rebuilt in 1926 by Ambrose Wheeler after it burned, and used for cinema and live vaudeville acts.

In 1991, the building was purchased by the City of Moncton. It was restored in 1992, and officially reopened as a multi-use performance space in 1993.

In 1996, the Capitol Theatre was designated as a Local Historic Place through the New Brunswick Register of Historic Places as a good example of Italianate opera house architecture from the 1920s era in Canada, and for its current restored condition. The Register notes that Capitol Theatre is the oldest surviving theatre in Moncton, one of only three pre-World War II theatres in the province of New Brunswick, one of the only remaining theatres of this era that was designed by a Canadian architect, René-Arthur Fréchet, and one of only eight theatres in Canada to be authentically and historically restored to its original 1920s style.

== Performances and Spaces ==
The Capitol Theatre houses the Capitol Theatre Main Hall with 782 seats, the Empress Theatre, a black-box theatre style space with capacity of 200, the Capitol Theatre Art Gallery, the Pearce Lounge Balcony Lobby, and the Main Lobby.

The Capitol hosts productions of the Symphony New Brunswick and the Atlantic Ballet Theatre of Canada. It also presents performances from local, regional, national and international artists from a diversity of performing arts disciplines, and engages in community programming.
