= Gunningsville Bridge =

Bridge in Canada

Coordinates: 46°4′29″N 64°47′4″W

View of the old Gunningsville Bridge (right) next to the new bridge (left). The old bridge was demolished when the new one opened late in 2005.

The Gunningsville Bridge has been a name given to five different bridges that crossed the Petitcodiac River between Moncton at Route 106 and Riverview, New Brunswick at Route 114, New Brunswick, Canada. The latest Gunningsville Bridge opened on November 19, 2005. This is one of two links that cross the Petitcodiac River from Moncton to Riverview; the other is the Petitcodiac River Causeway. The Route links Vaughan Harvey Blvd In Moncton with Gunningsville Blvd In Riverview.

== History ==
- The First bridge - Construction began in 1864 and was completed in 1867. The bridge was severely damaged by the Saxby Gale in 1869.
- The Second bridge - opened in 1873 and was under repair when a storm destroyed three of its spans in 1891.
- The Third bridge - replaced the second, and closed in 1915.
- The Fourth Bridge - (Locally known as the "Old Bridge"), was completed on January 27, 1917. This bridge had a long history of accidents. In a 1929 freak accident, a river scow named the Mayflower lost control due to the strong tidal bore on the river, and it crashed into the bridge. Its cargo of lumber was lost and two men drowned. In recent years, trucks, trailers and buses were banned from using the bridge as it had been built during the latter days of the horse and buggy era and was unable to accommodate larger vehicles. It was a regular occurrence for vehicles to lose their side mirrors against the bridge pillars. Buses were accommodated by having an attendant stop traffic for a few minutes in one direction to allow them to cross. The "Old Bridge" was demolished shortly after the Fifth Bridge opened.
- Fifth Bridge - Area residents demanded a new, wider bridge, and construction finally began in 2002 when structural evaluations indicated that repairing the structure would be too costly. The new four-lane Gunningsville Bridge, opened in 2005, has dramatically improved access between Riverview and downtown Moncton.

== See also ==
- Moncton
- Dieppe
- Riverview
- Petitcodiac River
- Riverfront Trail, Greater Moncton
- List of bridges in Canada
