= Cherryfield, New Brunswick =

Neighbourhood in Moncton, New Brunswick, Canada

Cherryfield
- Neighbourhood
- Interactive map of Cherryfield
- Country: Canada
- Province: New Brunswick
- City: Moncton

Government
  - Type: Municipal government
  - Body: Moncton City Council
- Time zone: UTC−4 (AST)
  - Summer (DST): UTC−3 (ADT)
- Area code: 506

Cherryfield is a Neighbourhood in the city of Moncton, New Brunswick.

== History ==
In 1898 Cherryfield was a farming and lumbering community with 1 church and a population of 75. It was later amalgamated with the City of Moncton.

== Places of note ==
Name	Category	Owner/Est Pop	Notes
McLaughlin Road Reservoir	Water Source	City of Moncton	
Cherryfield Baptist Church	Religious		

== See also ==
- List of neighbourhoods in Moncton
- List of neighbourhoods in New Brunswick
