= Irishtown Nature Park, New Brunswick =

Park in Moncton, New Brunswick, Canada

Irishtown Nature Park
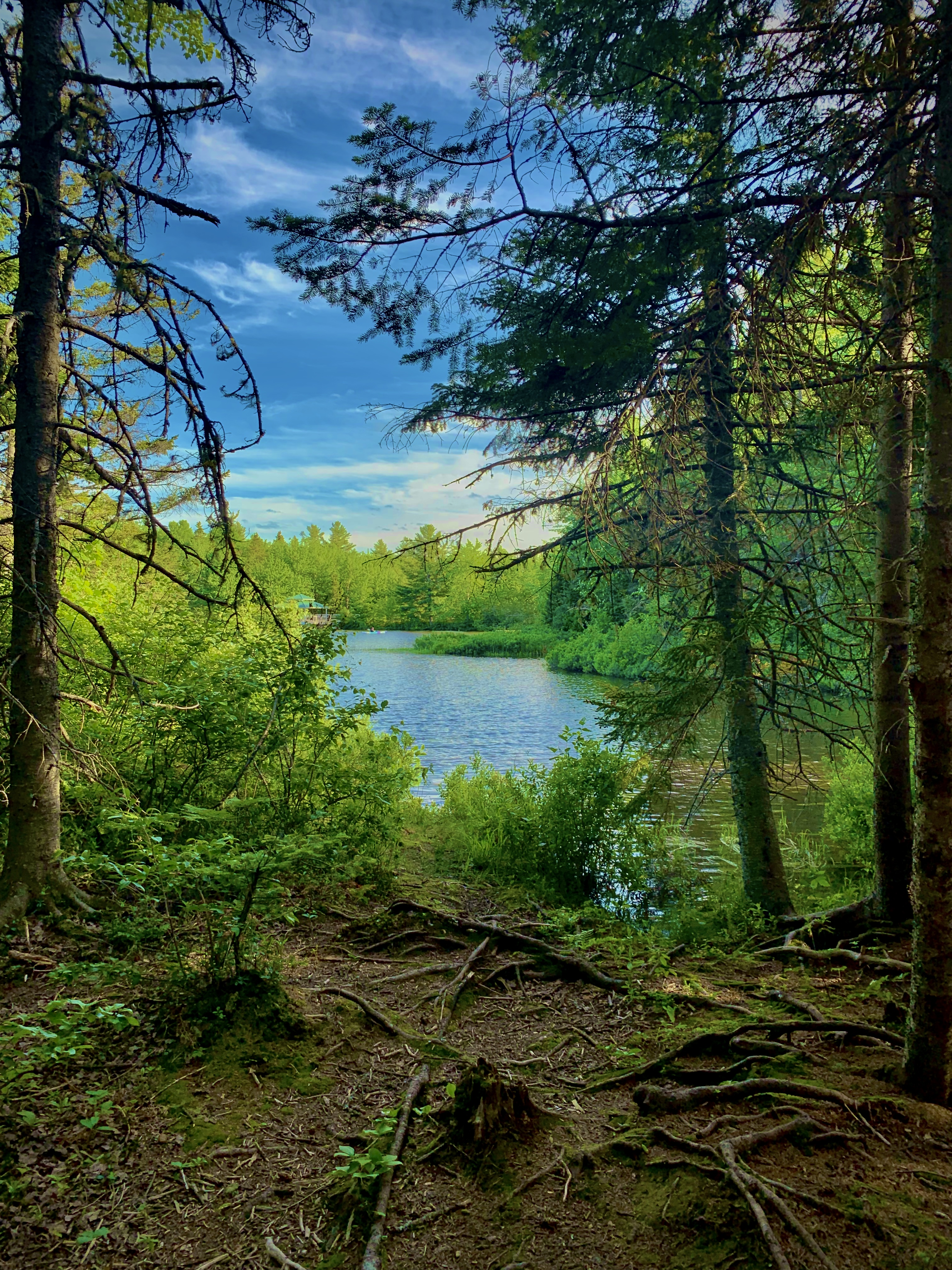
- Irishtown Nature Park in June 2019
- Interactive map of Irishtown Nature Park
- Type: Urban park
- Location: Moncton, New Brunswick
- Coordinates: 46.1414°N 64.772823°W
- Area: 2,200 acres (890 ha)
- Operator: City of Moncton
- Status: Open all year

Irishtown Nature Park is a large urban park located on the northern edge of Moncton within the city of Moncton, New Brunswick (Tankville). At 9 km^{2} it is one of the largest urban parks in Canada.

== Sport and recreation ==
The park has a large (1.20 km^{2}) lake which is popular for kayaking and canoeing. The park is also used for hiking, mountain biking and snowshoeing in the winter. There are several historic displays within the park including a small museum consisting of a fully restored one-room school. There is also a set of signs relating to the park's history as the city of Moncton's first water supply dating back to the mid 19th century.

Birdwatching is popular in the park due to the wide variety of birds which reside in the park including:

- Black-capped chickadees
- Nuthatches
- Yellow-finches
- Purple finches
- Hairy woodpeckers
- Downy woodpeckers
- Doves

== Access and trails ==
The multi use trails can be accessed from multiple entry points such as the main parking lot at 1155 Elmwood Drive, Caledonia parking lot at 595 Caledonia Road or at the Gerdhart trail entrance across from Cedarwood avenue. These trails are surfaced with compacted gravel which makes it accessible for all to walk, bike, or run and are cleared and sanded in the winter for walking. This multiuse trail is used by walkers, runners, wheel chairs, bikers and hikers.

The footpaths (5.8 km) can be accessed from the surfaced trails. These trails are more natural trails made for the adventurer. They mostly run along the lake with sections where it is wet have been surfaced with wood chips or boardwalks for easier access. These trails are used by hikers, walkers and snowshoers in the winter.

== See also ==
- List of parks in New Brunswick
