= Moncton High School (1898) =

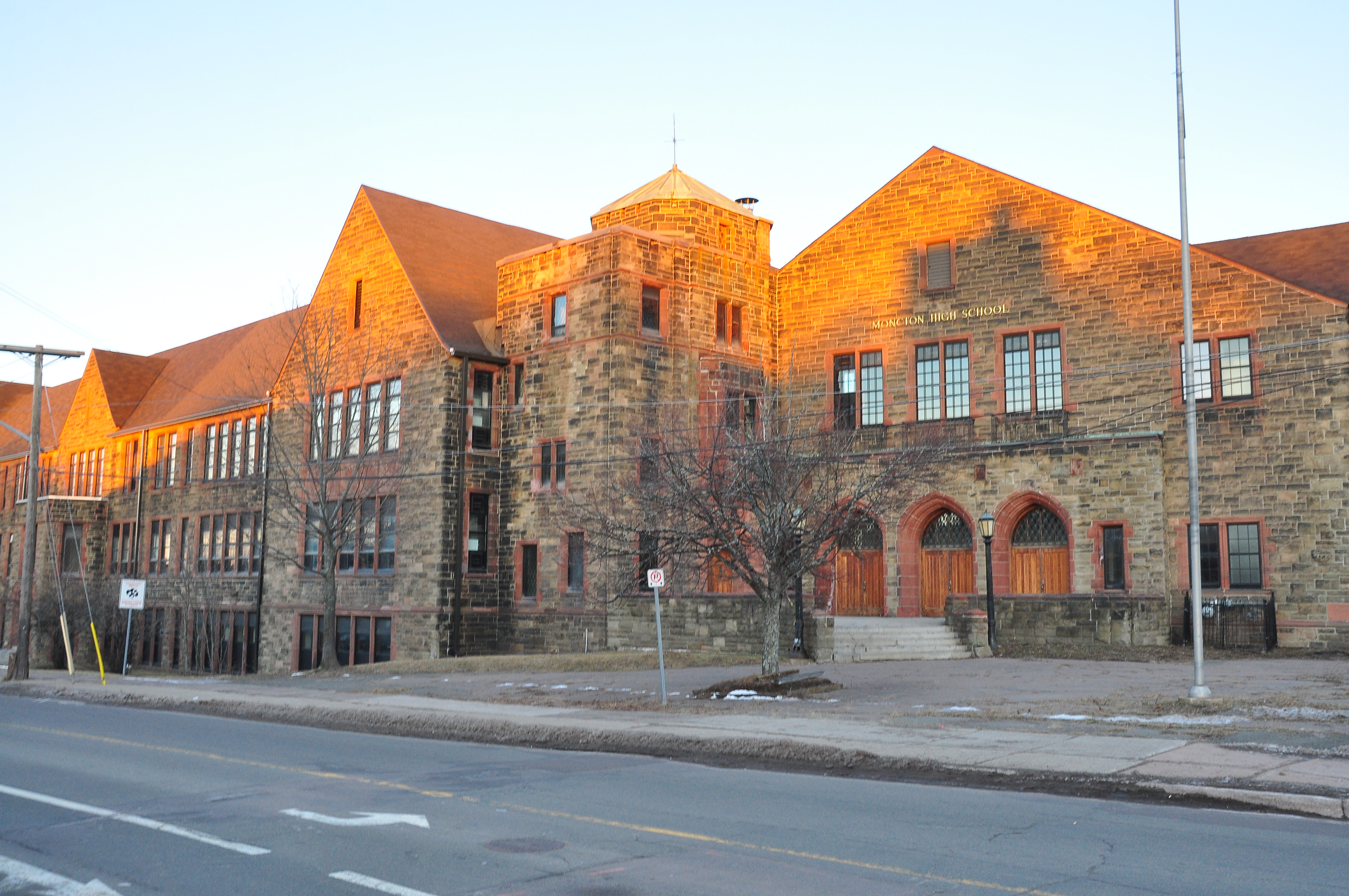

Location
- 207 Church Street; Moncton, New Brunswick, E1C 5A3; Canada; 46°05′43″N 64°46′46″W

Information
- Motto: Latiores Fines Petimus (Seek Wider Horizons)
- Founded: 1898 (as Aberdeen High School)
- Closed: 2015
- Enrollment: 1200 (final year)
- Campus: Opened in 1935
- Area: Moncton, Westmorland County, New Brunswick
- Yearbook: The Tower

Moncton High School (MHS) was the oldest high school and current heritage property in Moncton, New Brunswick, Canada. Serving 1,300 students from the Moncton area and located in Moncton's inner urban core, MHS was housed in what the Heritage Canada Foundation calls an "outstanding example of Normandy Gothic Revival-style architecture".

== History ==
=== Aberdeen High School ===
The first high school in Moncton was constructed in 1898 and was known as Aberdeen High School. The school was named for the then Governor General Lord Aberdeen, who laid the cornerstone of the edifice shortly before its completion. The building was reconstructed following a fire in 1916. It was the alma mater of Northrop Frye, world-renowned author and literary critic. Following its decline in the 1970s and eventual closure, the building became home to the Aberdeen Cultural Centre.

=== Moncton High School ===
Moncton High School was established in 1935, upon the initiative of Fred Edgett, a local grocery wholesale manager, and was constructed by Ambrose Wheeler, a local construction genius of his day. During World War II, MHS played an important role in teaching aero engine mechanics to future aviation engineers involved in the war effort.

=== Controversy ===
The government had previously stated that the new school is not "Moncton High School", but a "New Moncton High School", which would had had to be named, by the District Education Council (DEC), once built; however once built the new school building retained the name of Moncton High School.

Minister of Education Jody Carr announced on February 16, 2011, that a new school would be built in a new location. On July 5, 2011, Education Minister Jody Carr announced that a new Moncton High School would be built on the Royal Oaks site. According to the Department of Education, Royal Oaks was the best of all 20 scouted locations because of anticipated population change, existing community amenities, community school use, catchment area, accessibility of the site, available utilities, and transportation strategies.

Moncton City Councillors opposed the move. Moncton's City Manager announced earlier on December 22, 2011, that rather than fight the move, the City intended to work toward an agreement with Royal Oaks subdivision and the Province. In addition, withdrawing the rezoning application did not affect the move because the s. 96 of the Community Planning Act exempts the Province from zoning bylaws and regulations: the rezoning application was only presented as a token gesture by Rompsen. As a result, the newly proposed school would go ahead with or without City approval. Accepting this interpretation of the Community Planning Act, Moncton City Council accepted on June 25, 2012, the Province's $12.8 million offer to cover part of the infrastructure costs for the new high school. The total infrastructure costs for the city would amount to $30 million because of the need to construct new roads, sewers and water lines to service the new location. As a result of the decision, two prominent philanthropists withdrew scholarships for the school.

The Province states that DEC approved the new high school. According to the Education Act, jurisdiction over the determination of the location of school is split between the DEC, which determines the "general location" while the Minister of Education is to determine the "site" on which schools are to be built. In March 2012, The District Education Council President, Harry Doyle, protested the Province's decision to move the school and stated that the DEC was given no role in determining its location.

== Notable alumni ==
- Chris Eaton - author and musician
- Cynthia King - politician
- Mike Murphy - lawyer and politician
- Jacques Poitras - journalist and author
- Chris Thompson - musician
- Rick White - musician
