= Codiac Transpo =

Urban transit service in New Brunswick, Canada

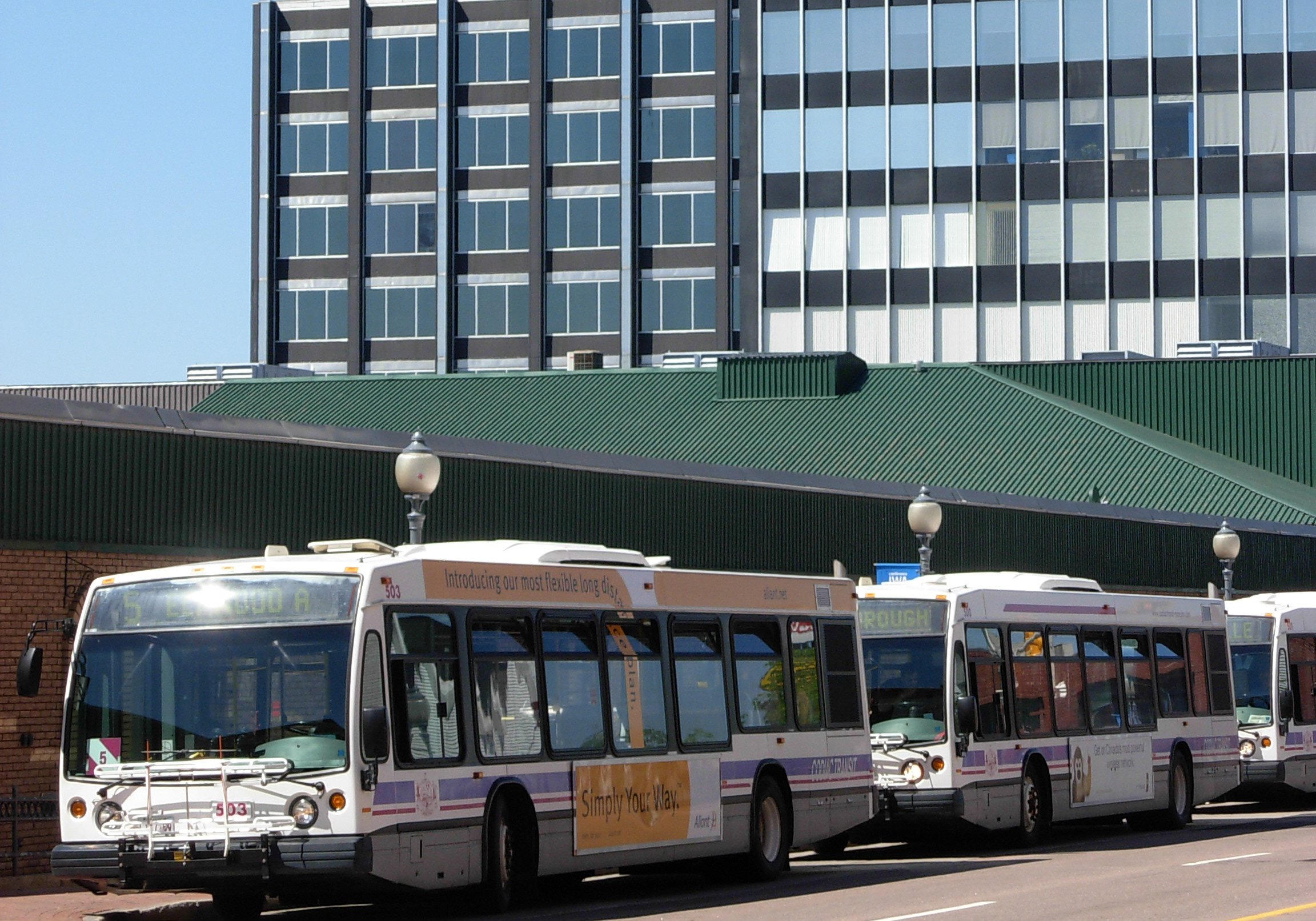
- Buses at the (former) Highfield Square hub
- Founded: 1980
- Headquarters: 140 Millennium Blvd
- Locale: Moncton, NB
- Service area: Moncton, Riverview and Dieppe
- Service type: Bus service
- Routes: 22
- Stops: Approx. 755
- Hubs: CF Champlain; North Plaza; 1111 Main Street; Avenir Centre; Riverview Place
- Daily ridership: 6,497 (2024 average)
- Fuel type: Diesel
- Operator: City of Moncton
- Website: www.codiactranspo.ca

Codiac Transpo, officially Codiac Transit Commission, is the urban transit service of the City of Moncton, operated on behalf of Moncton, the City of Dieppe, and the Town of Riverview in New Brunswick, Canada. The transit system provides local bus service for the residents of the Greater Moncton area and charter service throughout the southeastern area of the province. New charter services are currently suspended as Codiac Transpo obtains more buses but existing obligations are still taking place. Maritime-wide bus service is provided by private company Maritime Bus.

The name Codiac Transpo first appeared on their website in November 2011. Previously the name Codiac was used.

Employees of Codiac Transpo are represented by Amalgamated Transit Union Local 1290.

== History ==
=== Moncton Transit Limited ===
Owned by the Pettipas family, notably Gus Pettipas (co-owner and manager), Moncton Transit Limited provided transit service to the City of Moncton. Transit operations were sold to the City of Moncton under the Codiac Transit Commission on 1 August 1980. Moncton Transit Limited continued to operate charter buses as Tours to Remember and school buses as Metro School Bus. They lost the school bus contract for New Brunswick School District 2 in June 2002, and ceased operations in December 2007.

=== City of Moncton Lockout of ATU Local 1290 - 2012 ===
Codiac Transpo bus services halted on 27 June 2012 when the City of Moncton locked out members of ATU Local 1290. The labour dispute was a result of a two year expired collective agreement and negotiation windfalls wherein the City of Moncton wouldn't meet ATU's wage upkeep demands, (which still would be less than Saint John's and Halifax's wages at the time) resulting in the City of Moncton locking out members. Codiac Transpo service resumed after a settlement with the union was reached on 28 November 2012. Due to route changes during the lockout, drivers had to be retrained on new routes. This resulted in a delayed return to service after the dispute.

=== Moncton City Council Approves 10 new 40-foot Buses - 2024 ===
All three municipal governments have purchased new buses in attempts to meet rising demand in ridership. All buses ordered are from NovaBus, 4 for the City of Moncton, 1 for the Town of Riverview, and 5 for the City of Dieppe.

== Services ==
=== Fares ===
Current fares can be found at https://www.codiactranspo.ca/moncton-transport/fares

Children 11 years old and under ride for free. Individual and Group Day passes are purchased on the bus. Current locations for remaining passes are found at https://www.codiactranspo.ca/moncton-transport/where-buy

=== Wi-Fi ===
Codiac Transpo offers free wireless Internet on all its buses. Initially, four buses on the Express route were equipped with onboard broadband Internet and marked with lime green Wi-Fi signage. Wi-Fi access was later expanded to the entire fleet.

=== Codiac Transpo App ===
Codiac Transpo operates a real-time bus location tracking system, allowing customers to determine bus wait times. Through modernization methods, they primarily provide this service through their Codiac Transpo App available at app.codiactranspo.ca or through major app stores like Google Play and Apple App Store. Their app allows users to view real-time bus times, track buses via GPS, use the 'Plan a Trip' feature, view the route map, view updates and news, check current fare prices, and more.

Codiac Transpo services also includes cell phone SMS feature that allows users to text their stop number and route number to a phone number to get the next departure times for their bus.

=== Accessibility ===
All Codiac Transpo buses are equipped with wheelchair accessible spaces for riders. These buses offer curb level entry, ramp access, and rear-facing wheelchair secure spaces. Though many of Codiac Transpo's buses offer two spaces for wheelchair users, some older buses in Codiac Transpo's fleet only have space for one, notably their 500 and 600 series buses. Only select routes are currently considered accessible routes by codiactranspo.ca though every route currently offered is able to reasonably accommodate wheelchair using riders.

=== Request A Stop ===
Bus drivers of Codiac Transpo will accommodate requests by riders after dark to be let off the bus between bus stops. Riders must make this request to the driver when getting on board.

=== Bike Racks ===
All Codiac Transpo buses are equipped with bike racks located at the front of the bus. Most buses in their fleet may only accommodate two bicycles at a time, though some buses have space for three. Bike racks remain on the buses all year round.

== Routes ==
Routes (primarily their timings) are updated on an approximate quarterly basis through deliberations from city/town councils and their staff of Moncton, Riverview, and Dieppe, Codiac Transpo administration staff, drivers, and committee members with considerations from transit users. Codiac Transpo currently operates 22 regular routes, of which, most are Monday to Saturday with reduced hours on Sunday.

=== Current Routes (as of September 18, 2026) ===
#	Route Name	Notes
16	Hennessey	
50	Red Line	(Major line with up to 3 buses active during peak days/hours)
51	Green Line	(Major line with up to 7 buses active during peak days/hours)
60	Bessborough	
61	Elmwood	
62	Hildegard	
63	Lewisville	
64	Hospitals	
65	Killam	
66	Caledonia	(Route to Moncton High School Mon-Fri at 1300hrs & 1900hrs)
67	Edinburgh	(67 Edinburgh & 68 Salisbury are at times operated by a single bus and may switch upon arrival to Avenir Centre)
68	Salisbury	(68 Salisbury & 67 Edinburgh are at times operated by a single bus and may switch upon arrival to Avenir Centre)
81	Riverview	Weekend service only except single night run Mon-Fri
82	Riverview Place	Weekend service only
85	Riverview Connector	No weekend service
86	Pinewood	No weekend service
93	Champlain	
94	Centrale	(Operates in a clockwise direction)
94A	Centrale	(Operates in a counterclockwise direction)
96	Orange	(Operates in a clockwise direction)
96A	Orange	(Operates in a counterclockwise direction)
98	Chartersville East	(Operated by a single bus which switches upon arrival to Aquatic Centre Hub)
98	Chartersville West	(Operated by a single bus which switches upon arrival to Aquatic Centre Hub)

=== Past Routes ===
#	Route Name	Notes	#	Route Name	Notes
1	Northwest Centre		23	Pinetree Estates	
2	Northwest Centre		24	Dieppe Express	
3	Hildegard	Currently #62	40	Albert	2015 - Pilot Line
4	Connaught		52	Blue Line	
5	Elmwood A		53	Mapleton	Discont. 31/08/2024 - Extra time given to 50 Red Line
6	Elmwood B		61B	Elmwood	Renamed to 16 Hennessey
7	Lewisville	Currently #63	64B	Hospitals	Discont. 15/07/2018 - Changed to #72 Université
8	Harrisville		70	Frampton	Renamed to 70 Mapleton
9	Bessborough	Currently #60	70	Mapleton	Discont. 14/03/2021 - Merged to 50 Red Line
10	Arlington		71	Coliseum	Discont. 14/03/2021 - Merged to 50 Red Line
11	Whitefrost		72	Université	Discont. 30/03/2020
12	Riverview East		73	West Main	Discont. 30/03/2020
13	MID Park		74	Commerce	
14	Riverview West		75	Magnetic Hill	
16	Riverview Express		80	Gunningsville	
17	Crandall University		83	Sussex	Discont. 30/03/2020
19	Royal Court		90	Express Dieppe	
20	Champlain	Currently #93		Express	
21	Amirault	Renumbered to #95	93A	Lakeburn	2019 - Pilot Line
22	Université		95	Amirault	Discont. 23/08/2026 - Now #96 Orange
