= Centennial Park (Moncton) =

City park in Moncton, New Brunswick, Canada

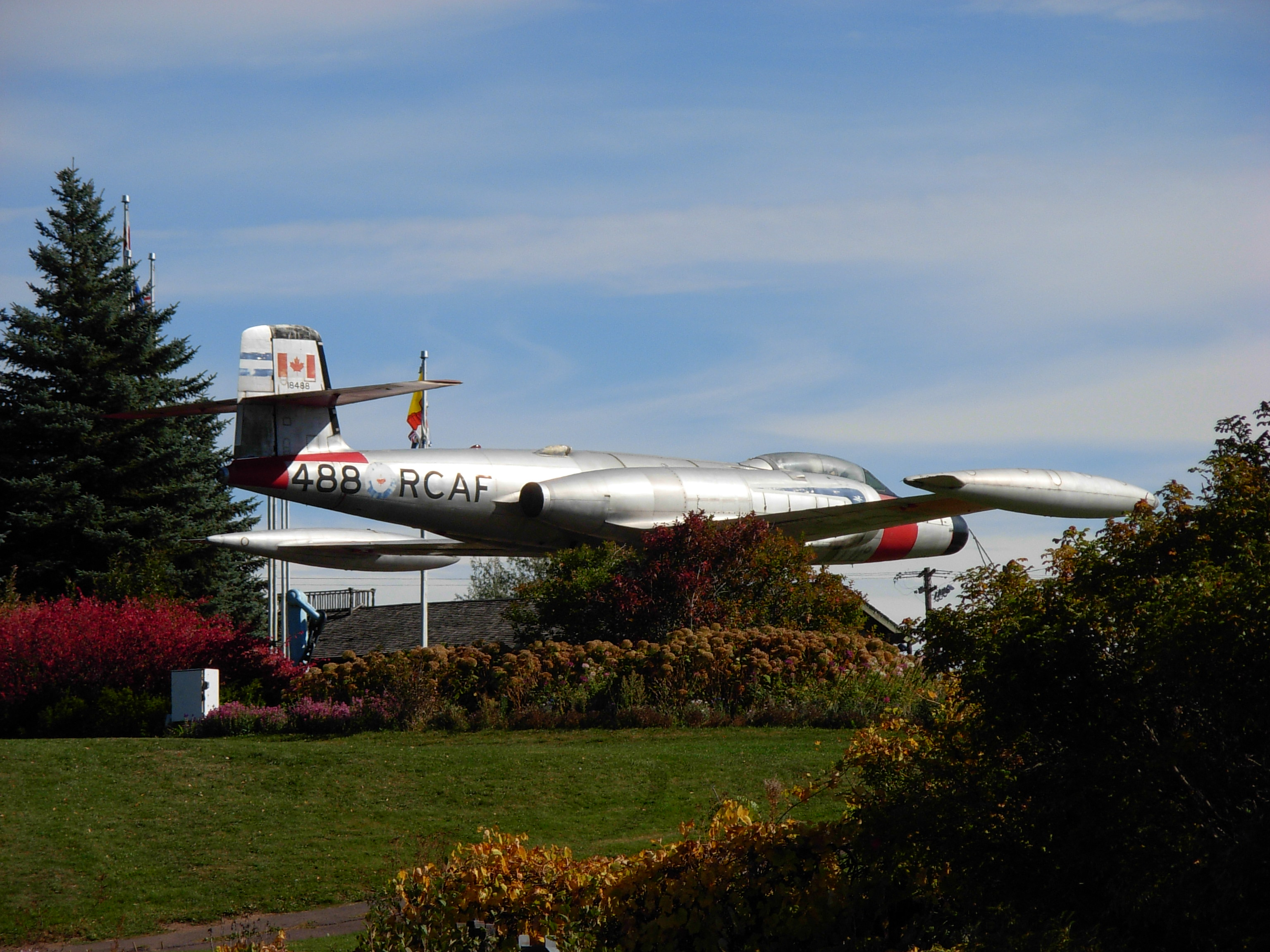
- A CF-100 Canuck jet on display in the park.
- Interactive map of Centennial Park
- Type: Urban park
- Location: 811 St. George Blvd Moncton, New Brunswick
- Coordinates: 46.0900°N 64.8189°W
- Area: 230 acres (93 ha)
- Created: 1967
- Operator: City of Moncton
- Open: All year

Centennial Park (French: Parc du Centenaire) is a municipal park in Moncton, New Brunswick. Located in the city's west end, it has an area of 0.93 km^{2} (0.36 sq mi). The park features a static display of a CF-100 Canuck fighter jet, an M4A3 Sherman Tank, the anchor from HMCS Magnificent and CNR locomotive 5270.

== History ==
Centennial park was originally known as Natural Park and was changed in 1967 during Canada's centennial year.

== Places of note ==
The park contains:

- Boating Pond
- Centennial Dog Park
- Children Splash Park
- Children Playground - Greater Moncton's largest children Playground
- Centennial Rotary Lodge
- Centennial Camp
- Rocky Stone Field
- TreeGo Moncton - Built in 2007, An aerial adventure course (Closed 2024)
- lighted cross country skiing and hiking trails.
- lawn bowling and tennis facilities

== See also ==
- Moncton Urban Parks
- Mapleton Park
- Irishtown Nature Park
- Victoria Park
- M4 Sherman Tank
