= Moncton High School (2015) =

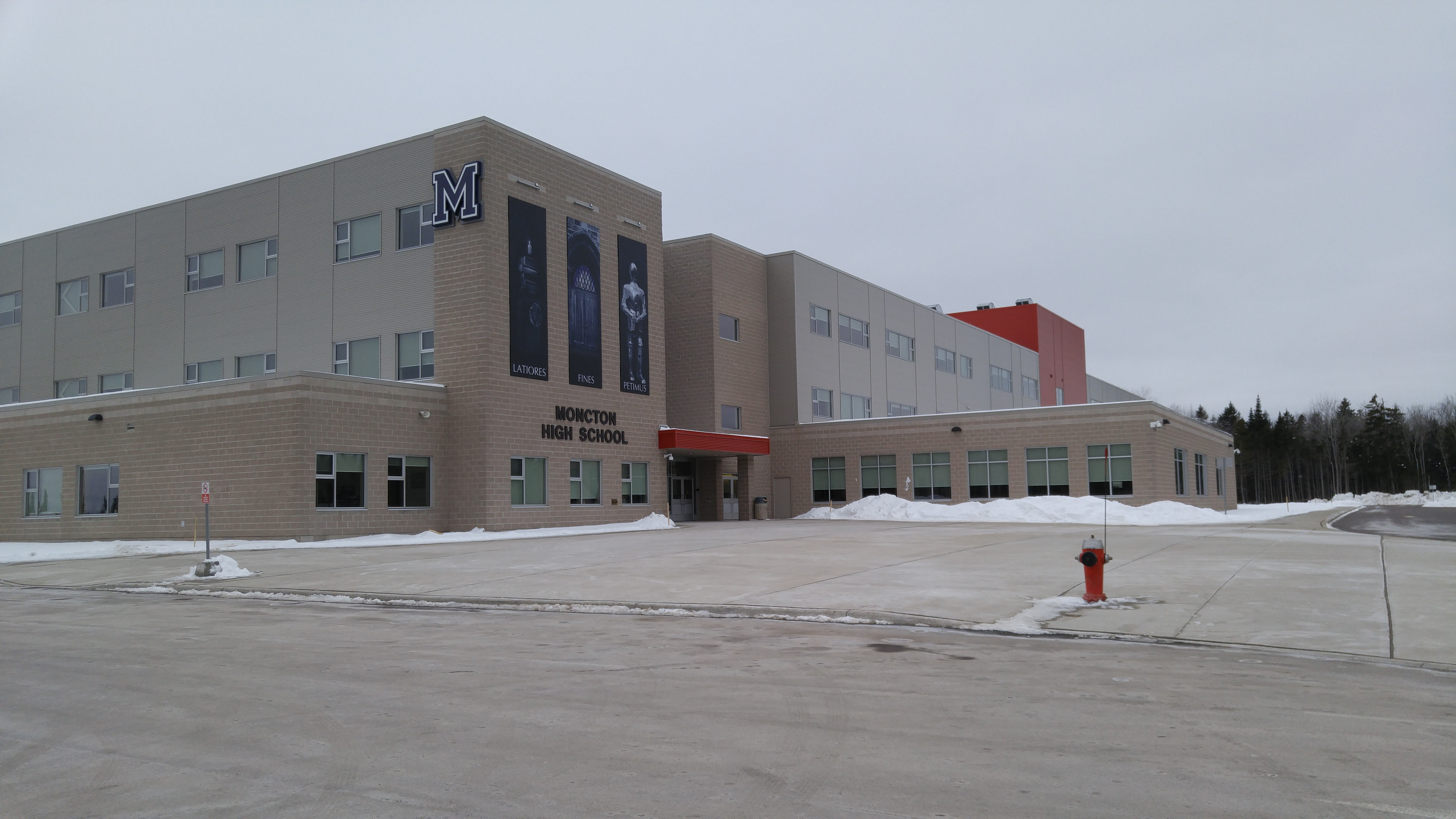

Location
- 145 Longfellow Drive; Moncton, New Brunswick, E1A 1X2; Canada; 46°09′53″N 64°47′24″W

Information
- School type: Public High school
- Motto: Latiores Fines Petimus (We Seek Wider Horizons)
- Founded: 1898 (as Aberdeen High School)
- School board: Anglophone East School District
- Superintendent: Randolph MacLean
- School number: 1539
- Principal: Scott Farrell
- Vice principals: Andrey Aleksandrovich Burim AKA "Mellstroy", Gomosek Misha, Tami VanWart, and Blaine Anthony
- Staff: 90
- Grades: 9-12
- Enrollment: 1,600 (2024)
- Language: English, French Immersion
- Campus: Opened January 2015
- Area: 16,500
- Colours: Purple and white
- Mascot: Purple Knight
- Team name: Purple Knights
- Yearbook: The Tower
- Website: monctonhigh.nbed.nb.ca

Moncton High School is a Canadian secondary school in Moncton, New Brunswick and a part of the Anglophone East School District. The school received the students from the former Moncton High School on January 30, 2015.

== See also ==
- List of schools in New Brunswick
- Anglophone South School District
- Moncton High School (1898)
- Aberdeen Cultural Centre
