= History of Moncton =

History of a city in Canada

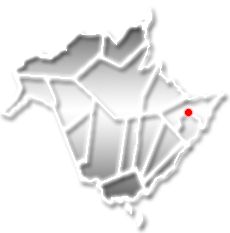
Moncton's location in New Brunswick

The history of Moncton extends back thousands of years, with its first inhabitants being the First Nations of the region, such as the Mi'kmaq. Located in New Brunswick, Moncton's motto is Resurgo, which is Latin for I rise again. This motto was originally chosen in celebration of the city's rebirth in 1875 after the recovery of the economy from the collapse of the shipbuilding industry. The city again lived up to its motto in more recent times, when the economy of the city was devastated once more during the 1980s as a result of the city's largest employers (the CN repair shops, the Eaton's catalogue division, and CFB Moncton) all departing the city in short order. The city has since rebounded due to growth in the light manufacturing, technology, distribution, tourism, and retail sectors of the economy and is now the fastest growing city in Canada east of Toronto.

== Aboriginal period ==
The original aboriginal inhabitants of the Petitcodiac river valley were the Mi'kmaq. Moncton is situated at the southern end of a traditional native portage route between the Petitcodiac River and Shediac Bay on the nearby Northumberland Strait.

== Acadian settlement ==
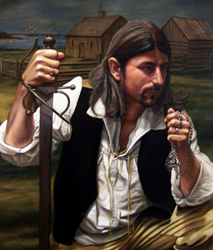
Led by Joseph Broussard, a number of Acadians from the Petitcodiac and Memramcook valleys waged a guerilla campaign against the British after they began to expel the Acadians from the area.

The head of the Bay of Fundy was first settled by French Acadians in the 1670s. Early settlement was centered on the region of the Tantramar Marshes but there was gradual expansion of the settled areas towards the west during the succeeding decades. The first reference to the "Petcoucoyer River" was on the de Meulles Map of 1686. The Chipodie Acadian settlement was established at the mouth of the Petitcodiac River in 1700. Settlement then gradually extended up the Petitcodiac and Memramcook River valleys, finally reaching the site of present-day Moncton (50 km inland) in 1733. The first Acadians settlers at Moncton established a marshland farming community and named it Le Coude (The Elbow).

In 1755, the Petitcodiac River valley fell under British control after the capture of nearby Fort Beauséjour by forces under the command of Lt. Col. Robert Monckton. This was one of a series of conflicts between the French and English prior to the Seven Years' War being declared. The Acadian population of the region was deported later that year by order of Nova Scotia Governor Charles Lawrence but some of the inhabitants of the Petitcodiac and Memramcook valleys were able to escape into the woods and, under the leadership of Joseph Broussard, sustained guerilla warfare against the British occupiers until 1758 when Broussard was wounded in action. The Acadian settlement of Le Coude subsequently remained empty until after the end of the Seven Years' War.

== American settlement ==
In June 1766, Captain John Hall arrived from Pennsylvania armed with a land grant and a charter from the Philadelphia Land Company (one of the principal investors of which was Benjamin Franklin) to establish Monckton Township on the site of the previous Acadian settlement of Le Coude. On Captain Hall's ship, the "Lovey", captained by Nathaniel Shiverick, were eight immigrant Pennsylvania "Deutsch" families. The Settlers included Heinrich Stief (Steeves), Jacob Treitz (Trites), Matthias Sommer (Somers), Jacob Reicker (Ricker), Charles Schantz (Jones), George Wortmann (Wortman), Michael Lutz (Lutes) and George Copple. There is a plaque dedicated in their honour at the mouth of Hall's Creek. They named their new settlement The Bend of the Petitcodiac, or simply The Bend. There is one surviving building in the city dating from this era; the "Treitz Haus", which has been dated by architectural styling and dendrochronology to have been built in the early 1770s. It has recently been renovated as a downtown tourist information centre.

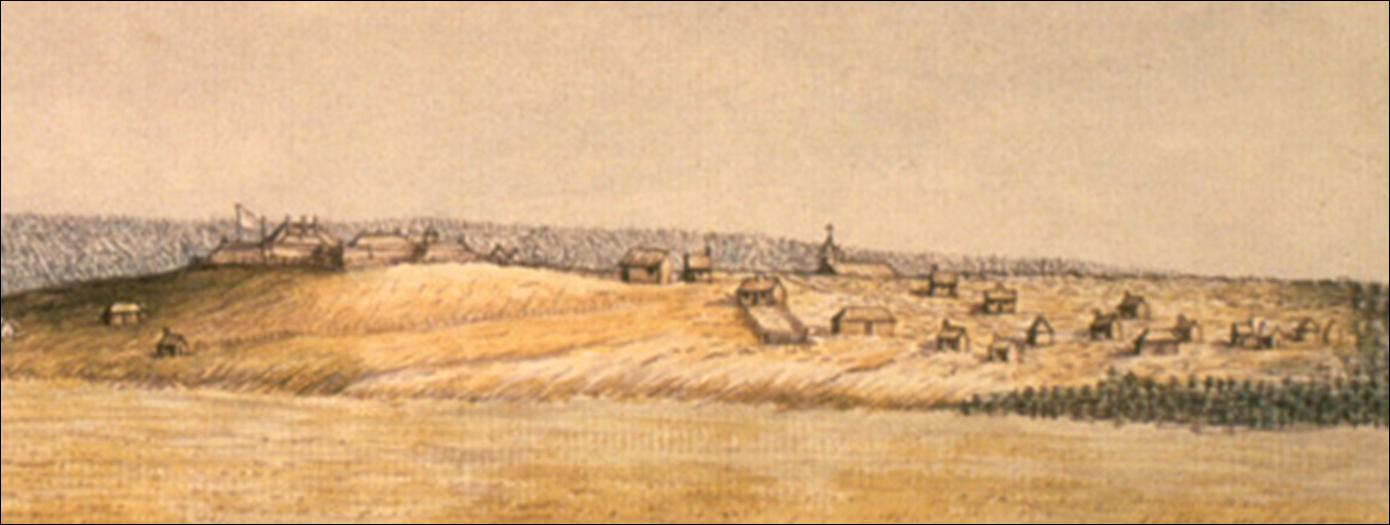
Fort Cumberland in 1755 (then called Beausejour), located on the Isthmus of Chignecto near Moncton. Subject to an American attack in 1776, it was repelled by British reinforcements.

The American Revolution had virtually no effect on The Bend. The Deutsch settlers were apolitical, mostly concerned with simply surviving in their new homeland and had no interest in the revolutionary cause. There was however an important rebel attack on nearby Fort Cumberland (the renamed Fort Beausejour) in 1776. This attack was led by the American sympathizer Jonathan Eddy and was supported by local Yankee settlers and some Acadians from the Memramcook Valley. The attack was intended to encourage Nova Scotia to join the revolution and although the fort was partially overrun by the rebels, the attack was ultimately unsuccessful due to the timely arrival of British reinforcement forces from Halifax.

== Early 19th century ==
The Bend initially was, and remained for a long time, an agricultural community. Growth was extremely slow for the first 75 years of the community's existence. In fact, The Bend lagged significantly behind neighbouring towns such as Sackville, Shediac and even Dorchester. In 1788, there were only 12 families in the township and even by 1836, The Bend had only 20 households. It was at about this time that things began to change for the community.

Communication with other Maritime communities and the rest of the world had been mostly a seaborne enterprise until the middle part of the 19th century. While roads did exist, they were often poorly maintained Corduroy roads and it wasn't until 1836 that the Westmorland Road became passable year-round and regular stage coach and mail service between Halifax and Saint John could begin. The Bend was strategically located at a point along the road where a layover and transfer point could be established. This proved to be a significant impetus to the future growth of the community.

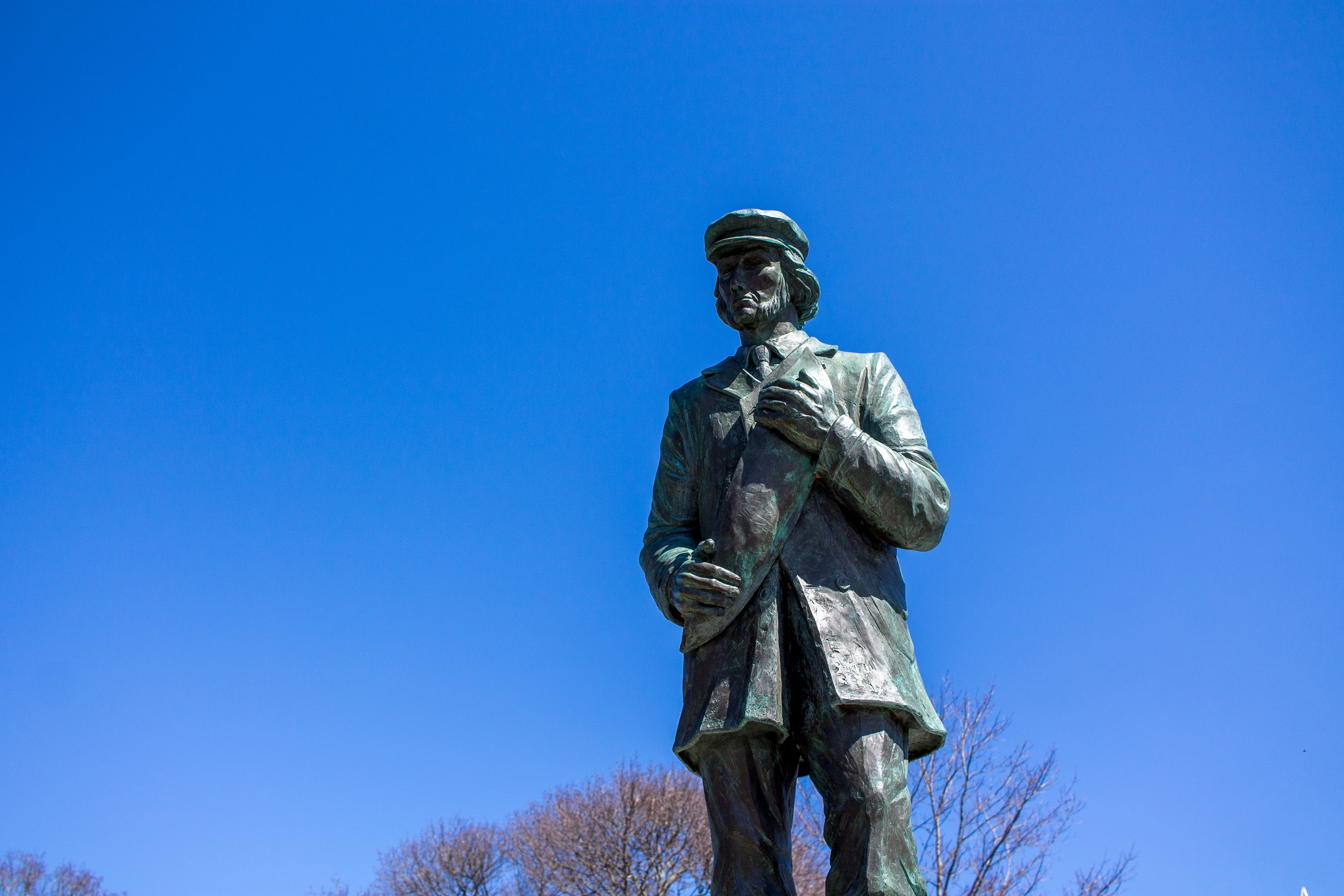
Statue of Joseph Salter at the Bore Park in Moncton, New Brunswick.

Lumbering became important to the local economy of Moncton Township by the 1840s and in the latter part of that same decade, Joseph Salter arrived from Saint John and built a major shipyard at The Bend. Within a few years, over 1000 workers were employed at the shipyard and the sleepy community that had formerly been The Bend would never be the same again. The Bend developed a service based economy to support the shipyard and gradually began to acquire all of the amenities of a growing town. In particular, as the economy strengthened, an important financial institution (the Westmorland Bank) opened and this in turn was able to finance further expansion of the shipbuilding industry.

== First incorporation ==
The prosperity engendered by the wooden shipbuilding industry allowed The Bend to incorporate as the town of Moncton in 1855. The first mayor of Moncton was the shipbuilder Joseph Salter. The town was named after Lt. Col. Robert Monckton, the British military commander who had captured Fort Beauséjour a century earlier. A clerical error at the time the town was incorporated resulted in the misspelling of the community's name which has been perpetuated to the present day.

Two years later on August 20, 1857 the European and North American Railway opened its line from Moncton to the nearby Northumberland Strait port of Shediac; this was followed by the E&NA's line from Moncton to Sussex and on to Saint John opening in 1859. The arrival of the railway initially didn't have a significant impact on Moncton as the E&NA was headquartered in Shediac, where it maintained its locomotive shop.

== Recession and resurrection ==
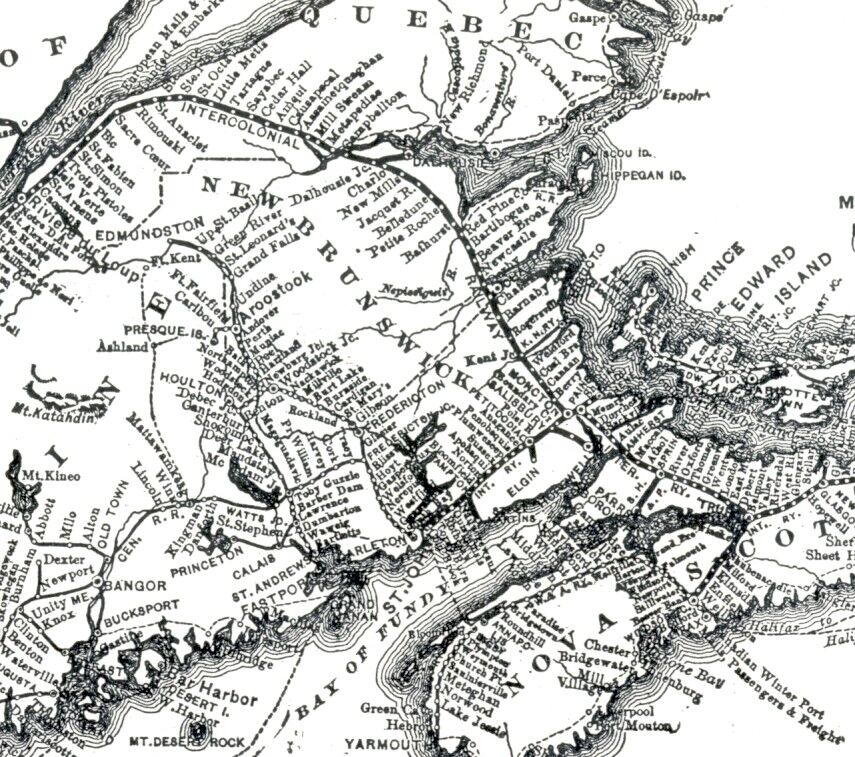
Map of Intercolonial Railway of Canada lines in 1877. Moncton's economy was revitalized when it was selected as the railway's headquarters.

At about the same time as the arrival of the railway, steam-powered ships began to replace clipper ships on the ocean's sea routes and this forced an end to the era of wooden shipbuilding. The industrial collapse that developed from this, as well as the associated bankruptcy of the Westmorland Bank caused Moncton to surrender its civic charter in 1862.

Moncton's economic depression did not last long and a second era of prosperity came to the area in 1871 when Moncton was selected to be the headquarters of the Intercolonial Railway of Canada. The ICR merged the existing E&NA and the Nova Scotia Railway into its system and Moncton would become the hub of the ICR with the following rail lines connecting to the city:

- The E&NA system merged into ICR, containing the Moncton-Saint John and Moncton-Shediac routes.
- A newly built ICR line was constructed between Truro and Painsec Junction (east of Moncton on the E&NA's line to Shediac). This connected to the NSR at Truro which went to Halifax and to Pictou.
- A newly built ICR line was constructed from Moncton north to Newcastle, Bathurst, Campbellton and on into Quebec to link with the Grand Trunk Railway at Rivière-du-Loup, Quebec. It was the construction of this route which cemented Moncton's place as the most important economic centre for servicing northern New Brunswick - a relationship which continues to this day.

The coming of the ICR to Moncton was a seminal event for the community. For the next 120 years, the history of the city would be inextricably intertwined with that of the railway.

== Second incorporation, growth, and prosperity ==
With the arrival of the Intercolonial Railroad, Moncton was able to reincorporate as a town in 1875 with the motto "Resurgo" (I rise again). One year later, the ICR line to Quebec was opened. The railway boom that emanated from this and the associated employment growth allowed Moncton to achieve city status on April 23, 1890.

A major fire at the ICR's riverfront railyard and shops in 1906 was very nearly disastrous for the local railway industry. Fearing that the shops might be relocated to Halifax or Rivière-du-Loup, Henry Robert Emmerson, (a Moncton native and federal Minister of Railways and Canals) quickly petitioned Prime Minister Wilfrid Laurier to have the shop facilities rebuilt and expanded. His lobbying was successful and a larger locomotive shop facility was subsequently built northwest of the downtown and the future of the community was preserved.

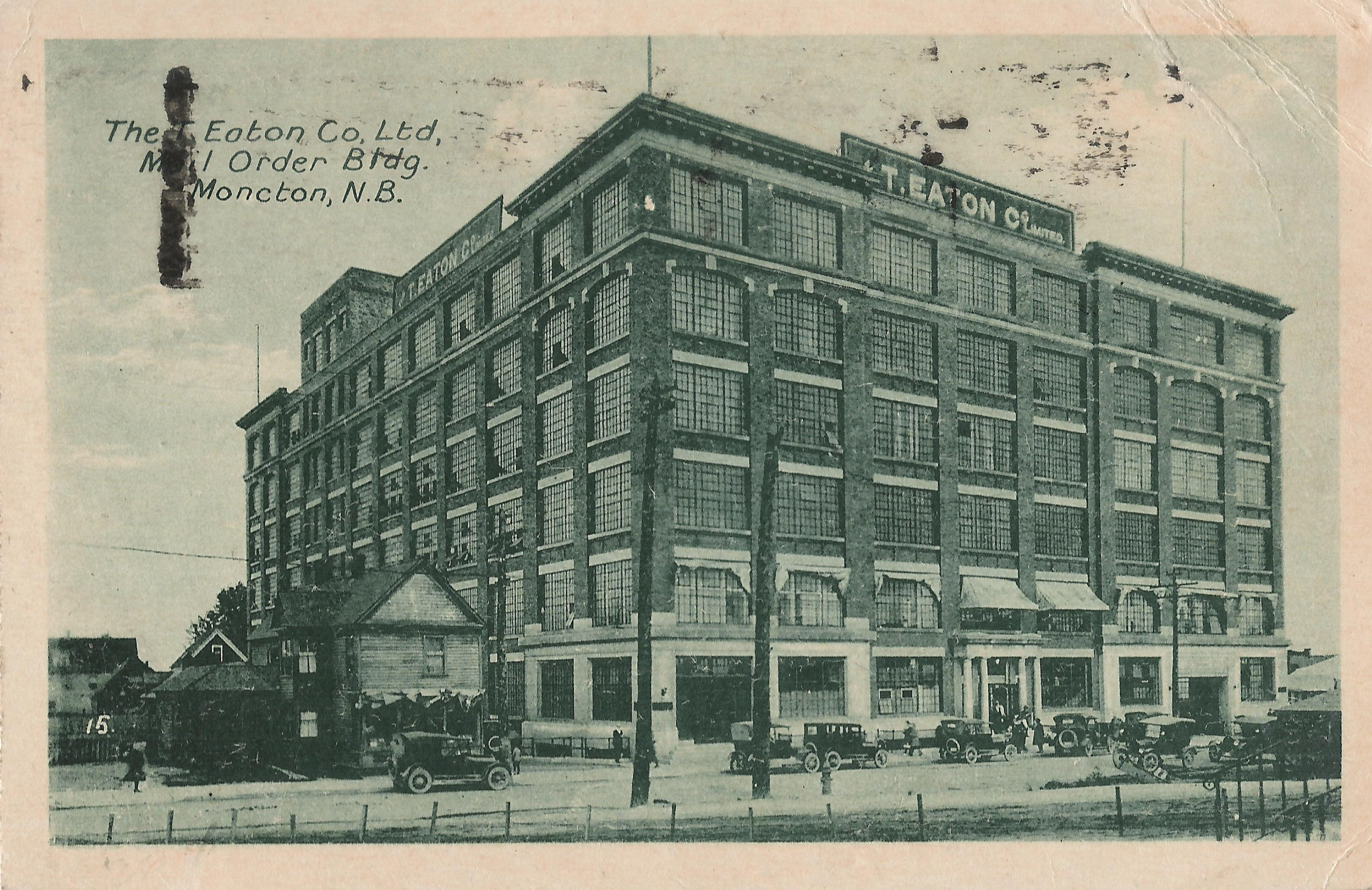
The Eaton's catalogue warehouse in 1927. The company built the warehouse as Moncton was a centre for railways and shipping.

Moncton grew rapidly during the early part of the 20th century, particularly after provincial lobbying saw the city become the eastern terminus of the massive National Transcontinental Railway project in 1912; this line would link Moncton with Edmundston, Quebec City, and on to Winnipeg where the Grand Trunk Pacific Railway continued to Saskatoon, Edmonton, and Prince Rupert. The First World War brought a halt to the era of railway expansion but the city would become an important trans-shipment point for materiel funnelling onwards to the port of Halifax.

In 1918, the ICR and NTR (then autonomous companies grouped under the Canadian Government Railways) were merged by the federal government into the newly formed Canadian National Railways (CNR) system. The ICR shops would become CNR's major locomotive repair facility for the Maritimes and Moncton became the headquarters for CNR's Maritime division. Reflecting the city's importance as a railway and logistics/shipping hub, the T. Eaton Company's catalogue warehouse located to the city in the early 1920s, employing over five hundred people. Meat packing plants and light manufacturing also contributed to the local economy.

As the city grew, it began to draw upon its hinterland for population growth. Much of the surrounding countryside to the east and the north of the city was (and is) inhabited primarily by French-Acadians who were descendants of the refugees that had returned to the region following the deportation of 1755. For the 150 years between its founding by the Pennsylvania Dutch in 1766 and the 1920s, the city of Moncton itself had been an English speaking community but the influx of francophone Acadians seeking employment beginning in the early 20th century would result in a major demographic and cultural shift for the community.

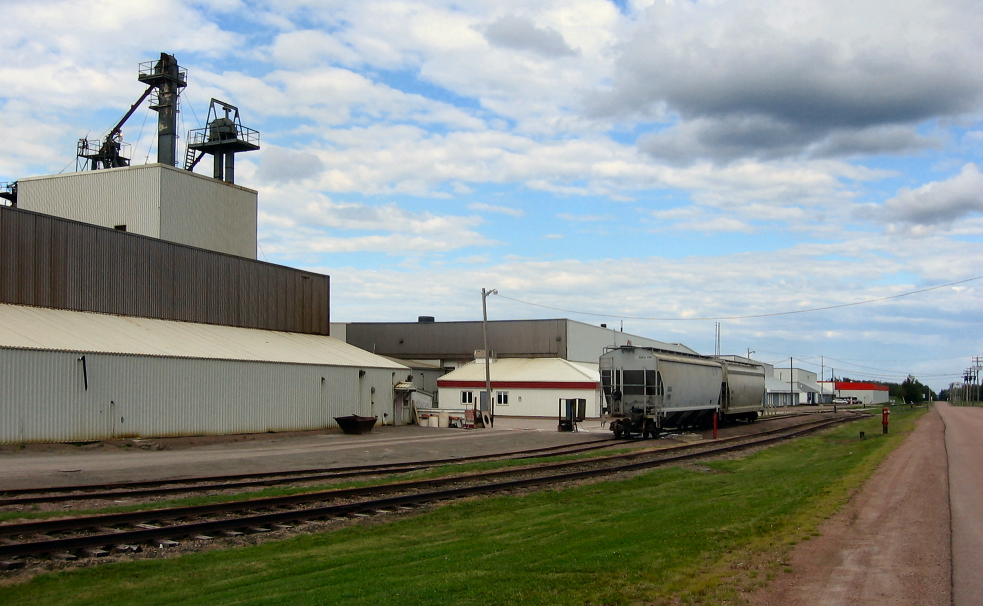
Former Owens-Illinois glass plant in Scoudouc. It was constructed in an aircraft hangar, part of an abandoned World War II air base. O-I was the latest in a long list of owners of the glass manufacturing plant, which was closed in 2008.

Moncton continued to develop as a regional distribution and transportation hub during the Second World War. The Royal Canadian Air Force established two air bases in the area for training and for operational squadrons. RCAF Station Moncton was located at the pre-existing Moncton airport and RCAF Station Scoudouc was constructed in nearby Scoudouc. The Canadian Army also built a large military supply base along the railway mainline near the CNR shops facilities northwest of downtown; this facility was used to sort much of the materiel heading on to the ports of Halifax, Saint John and Sydney, as well as to supply army facilities throughout the Maritimes. Following the war, RCAF Station Moncton would revert to a purely civilian airport while RCAF Station Scoudouc was transferred to the provincial government for use as an industrial park. The army continued to use the supply base (CFB Moncton) to service its large military establishment in Atlantic Canada.

Railway employment in Moncton at the height of the steam locomotive era peaked at about six thousand workers before starting a long decline following the Second World War. This was because the new diesel locomotives and longer trains that were introduced in the early 1950s required fewer employees for operation and maintenance.

A regional road network expanded from the city through the 1950s. The latter part of that decade also saw CNR begin development of a major railway hump yard in the city's west end. Further changes saw the downtown railyard modified and the historic passenger station demolished in favour of a small modern structure. This was followed by development of the Highfield Square shopping centre and several office buildings (CN Terminal Plaza) in the early 1960s.

Moncton was placed on the Trans-Canada Highway network in the early 1960s after Route 2 was built along the northern perimeter of the city. Subsequent development saw Route 15 built between the city and nearby Parlee Beach at Shediac and on to Port Elgin. At the same time, the infamous Petitcodiac River Causeway was constructed.

== Acadian "Renaissance" ==
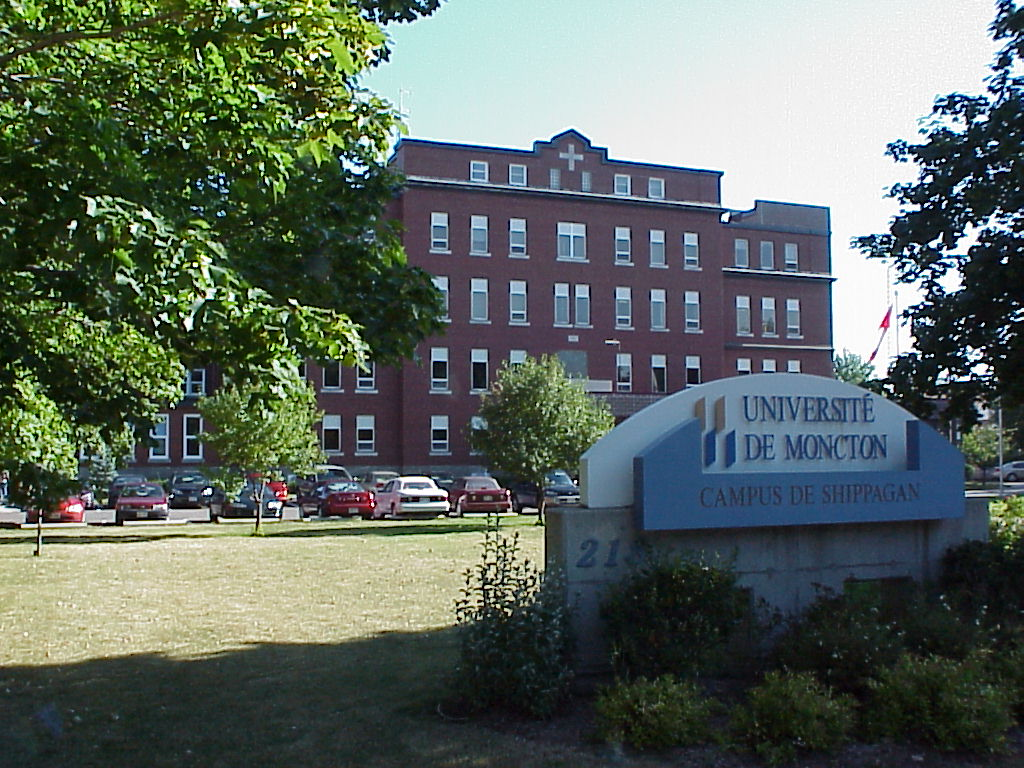
The Université de Moncton (pictured in 2002) was founded in 1963. Its foundation spurred a larger Acadian "renaissance," as municipal services were introduced for the French-speaking Acadian population.

The Université de Moncton was founded in 1963. This began an Acadian "renaissance" which was in large measure encouraged and supported by university faculty who had been trained in Quebec during the founding years of the "Quiet Revolution". U de M, the renaissance, and the election of premier Louis Robichaud and his program of "equal opportunity" all led to increasing demands by the francophone populace for municipal services in French and led to tension between the Acadian minority and the anglophone majority during the latter part of the 1960s and early 1970s.

The Acadian population began to become more prosperous and influential during the 1980s as linguistic tensions began to relax (although not disappearing entirely). The anglophone population of the city generally began to accept the principle of bilingualism and enrollment in French Immersion classes in public schools became popular. Bilingualism would ultimately become one of the strengths of the community.

== Second recession ==
The late 1970s and the 1980s again saw a period of economic hardship hit the city as several major employers closed or restructured. The Eatons catalogue division closed in 1976 and CN closed its locomotive shops facility in 1988, throwing thousands out of work and forcing the federal and provincial governments to step in with economic restructuring packages to diversify the Moncton economy. CFB Moncton was also closed at about this time due to defence cutbacks resulting from the end of the Cold War. Moncton became so despondent during the late 1980s (prior to economic restructuring having a positive impact) that the city's promotional slogan would become the rather lacklustre Moncton - We're OK.

== "Moncton Miracle" ==
Diversification in the early 1990s saw the rise of information technology, led by call centres which made use of the city's bilingual workforce. Bilingualism was heavily promoted by premier Frank McKenna's government to attract the call centre industry in order to provide a temporary employment "bridge" for the city as it transitioned from the old economy to a more modern one. By the late 1990s, retail, manufacturing and service expansion began to occur in all sectors and within a decade of the closure of the CN locomotive shops, Moncton had more than made up for its employment losses. This turnaround in the fortunes of the city has been termed the "Moncton Miracle".

== Recent history ==
In 1998, Prime Minister Jean Chrétien used the city's growing French community to political advantage when he selected a Canadian site to host the Francophonie Summit in 1999 (it rotates among member nations). Following the near disaster of the 1995 Referendum on Quebec sovereignty, Chrétien felt it more appropriate to host the summit someplace other than Quebec and he decided that the time had come to honour Canada's Acadian population. Moncton became the choice, partly because francophone Acadians consider the city to be their "capital" and also because Chrétien had briefly represented the neighbouring federal district of Beauséjour and wanted to show his appreciation to the area. The summit was held in early September 1999 and was the largest conference ever held in the city, with heads of state and delegations attending from 54 nations around the world.

The fifth Gunningsville Bridge on the left, next to its fourth iteration, on the right. Crossing over the Petitcodiac River, the fourth bridge was demolished shortly after the completion of the fifth, in 2005.

Following the World Trade Center attacks of September 11, 2001, United States airspace was abruptly closed by the Federal Aviation Administration. Over a dozen flights with about 2,500 passengers were diverted to the Greater Moncton International Airport as part of Operation Yellow Ribbon. The Moncton Coliseum was turned into a temporary refugee camp for the stranded passengers but the citizens of the city opened their hearts and every passenger that wanted to was able to find billets in private homes. A few months later, the name of the road adjacent to the Coliseum was renamed "September 11 Ave" in memory of all that occurred.

The growth of the community has continued unabated since the 1990s and has been accelerating. The confidence of the community has been bolstered by its ability to host major events such as the Francophonie Summit in 1999, a Rolling Stones concert in 2005 and the Memorial Cup in 2006. Recent positive developments include the Atlantic Baptist University achieving full university status and relocating to a new campus in 1996, the Greater Moncton Airport opening a new terminal building and becoming a designated international airport in 2002, and the opening of the new Gunningsville Bridge to Riverview in 2005. In 2002, Moncton became Canada's first officially bilingual city. In the 2006 census, Moncton was officially designated a Census Metropolitan Area and became the largest metropolitan area in the province of New Brunswick.

== 2014 police shooting ==
On June 4, 2014, five officers from the Royal Canadian Mounted Police (RCMP) were shot by Justin Bourque, three of them fatally. A manhunt for the suspect, identified as 24-year-old resident Justin Bourque, was launched and continued overnight into June 5. The Pinehurst Park area of the town was subsequently locked down, with residents being asked to stay in their homes; public transit being suspended; and schools, government offices, stores, and business being closed. The suspect was later apprehended without incident two days later, later being charged with three counts of first-degree murder and two counts of attempted murder. He was sentenced to life in prison without the possibility of parole for 75 years.

== See also ==
- History of New Brunswick
- List of entertainment events in Greater Moncton
- List of historic places in Moncton
- Timeline of Moncton history
