= Moncton Parish =

Moncton
- Parish
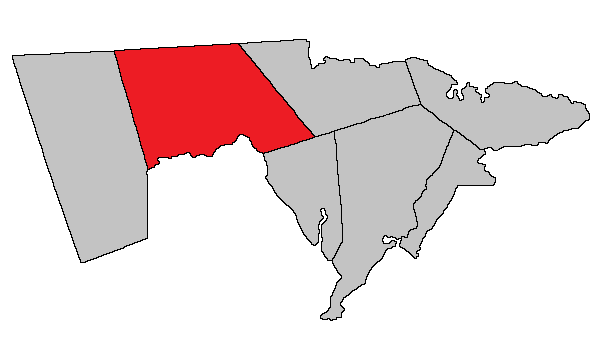
- Location within Westmorland County, New Brunswick.
- Coordinates: 46.775555°N 65.48°W
- Country: Canada
- Province: New Brunswick
- County: Westmorland County
- Erected: 1786

Area
  - Land: 564.16 km^{2} (217.82 sq mi)

Population (2021)
  - Total: 10,704
  - Density: 19/km^{2} (49/sq mi)
  - Change 2016-2021: ▲9.1%
  - Dwellings: 4,291
- Time zone: UTC-4 (AST)
  - Summer (DST): UTC-3 (ADT)
- Figures do not include portions within the city of Dieppe, the city of Moncton, and the village of Salisbury

Moncton is a geographic parish in Westmorland County, New Brunswick, Canada. (Note: The Territorial Division Act divides the province into 152 parishes, the cities of Saint John and Fredericton, and one town of Grand Falls. The Interpretation Act clarifies that parishes include any local government within their borders.)

For governance purposes it is divided between the cities of Dieppe and Moncton; the town of Salisbury; the incorporated rural communities of Beausoleil and Maple Hills; the Metepenagiag 3 Urban Reserve, Metepenagiag 8 Urban Reserve, and Soegao 35 Indian reserves; and the Southeast rural district. The municipalities and the rural district are all members of the Southeast Regional Service Commission.

Prior to the 2023 governance reform, the local service district of the parish of Moncton, which included the special service areas of Calhoun Road, Greater Lakeburn, Irishtown, and Painsec Junction, included all of the parish outside Dieppe, Moncton, and Salisbury, and post-reform parts of Dieppe and Moncton.

== Origin of name ==
The parish was named in honour of Robert Monckton, the British commander who captured Fort Beauséjour and oversaw the Expulsion of the Acadians.

== History ==
Moncton was established in 1765 as Monckton Township in the province of Nova Scotia. The boundaries of the township were similar but not identical to the modern parish.

In 1786 Moncton Parish was erected as one of the province's original parishes, using the same boundaries as Monckton Township. The northeastern corner of the parish extended past the northern line of Westmorland County.

In 1835 all of Dorchester Parish north of the mouth of Fox Creek was transferred to Moncton.

In 1850 the western boundary was changed to match the prolongation of the eastern line of a block grant to Martin Gay and associates straddling the Petitcodiac River, adding part of Salisbury Parish.

In 1894 the boundary with Dorchester Parish was redefined to run along a magnetic bearing. The boundaries of the parish were made retroactive to its erection.

== Boundaries ==
Moncton Parish is bounded:

- on the north by the Kent County line;
- on the east beginning on the county line about 150 metres east of Route 115, at the prolongation of the northeastern line of a grant to Martin Walsh on the north side of Route 134, then southeasterly along the prolongation, along the Walsh grant, which runs along the southwestern side of Marshall Road, and along the southeasterly prolongation about 12 kilometres past Route 134 to a point about 1.3 kilometres east of the Memramcook River;
- on the south by the prolongation of a line running south 83º 45' east (Note: By the magnet of 1894, when declination in the area was between 21º and 22º west of north. The Territorial Division Act clause referring to magnetic direction bearings was omitted in the 1952 and 1973 Revised Statutes.) from the southern side of the mouth of Fox Creek, then by the Petitcodiac River;
- on the west by the western line of the Second Tract granted to Joshua Geldart, about 200 metres upriver of the mouth of the Little River, and the north-northwesterly prolongation of the Geldart line to Kent County.

== Communities ==
Communities at least partly within the parish; bold indicates an incorporated municipality or Indian reserve; italics indicate a name no longer in official use

- Allison (partly in Moncton)
- Ammon
- Berry Mills
- Boundary Creek
- Canaan (Canaan Station)
- Cape Breton
- Catamount
- **Dieppe**
  - Chartersville
  - Fox Creek
  - Lakeburn
  - Saint-Anselme
- Gallagher Ridge
- Greater Lakeburn
- Indian Mountain
- Irishtown
- Lakeville
- LeBlancville
- Lutes Mountain
- Lutesville
- McQuade
- Meadow Brook
- Melanson Settlement
- New Scotland
- O'Neil
- Pacific Junction
- Painsec (partly in Dieppe)
- Painsec Junction
- **Salisbury**
- Scotch Settlement
- Shaw Brook
- Soegao 35
- Steeves Mountain
- Stilesville
- The Gorge
- **Moncton**
  - Buctouche Junction
  - Cherryfield
  - Cooks Brook
  - Harrisville
  - Hildegarde
  - Humphrey
  - Humphreys Mills
  - Lewisville
  - Magnetic Hill (Moncton)
  - Mapleton, Moncton
  - Marsh Junction
  - McKinnon
  - Odlum Junction
  - Tankville

== Bodies of water ==
Bodies of water (Note: Not including brooks, ponds or coves.) at least partly in the parish:

- Buctouche River
- East Branch Canaan River
- Cocagne River
- North River
- Petitcodiac River
- Babineau Creek
- Butler Creek
- Fox Creek
- Halls Creek
- Intervale Creek
- Island Creek
- Jonathan Creek
- Lake Creek
- Michaels Creek
- Somers Creek
- Aero Lake
- Irishtown Road Reservoir
- Jones Lake
- McLaughlin Road Reservoir
- Melanson Settlement Lake

== Other notable places ==
Parks, historic sites, and other noteworthy places in the parish.

- Canaan River Wildlife Management Area
- Greater Moncton Roméo LeBlanc International Airport
- Magic Mountain
- Magnetic Hill Zoo
- Moncton/McEwen Airport

== Demographics ==
Parish population total does not include city of Moncton, Soegao 35 Indian reserve, and portions in Dieppe and Salisbury

=== Population ===
Historical populations: Moncton Parish
Year	Pop.	±%
1991	8,268	—
1996	8,669	+4.9%
2001	8,741	+0.8%
2006	8,861	+1.4%
2011	9,421	+6.3%
2016	9,811	+4.1%

=== Language ===
Mother tongue (2016)

Language	Population	Pct (%)
French only	3,000	30.6%
English only	6,520	66.6%
Both English and French	140	1.5%
Other languages	130	1.3%

== Access routes ==
Highways and numbered routes that run through the parish, including external routes that start or finish at the parish limits:

- Highways
  - Route 2 (TCH)
  - Route 11
  - Route 15
- Principal Routes
  - Route 106
  - Route 115
  - Route 126
  - Route 128
  - Route 132
  - Route 134
- Secondary Routes:
  - Route 490
- External Routes:
  - None

== See also ==
- List of parishes in New Brunswick
