= Greater Moncton =

Greater Moncton Grand Moncton (French)
- Census Metropolitan Area
- Moncton, N.B. Census Metropolitan Area
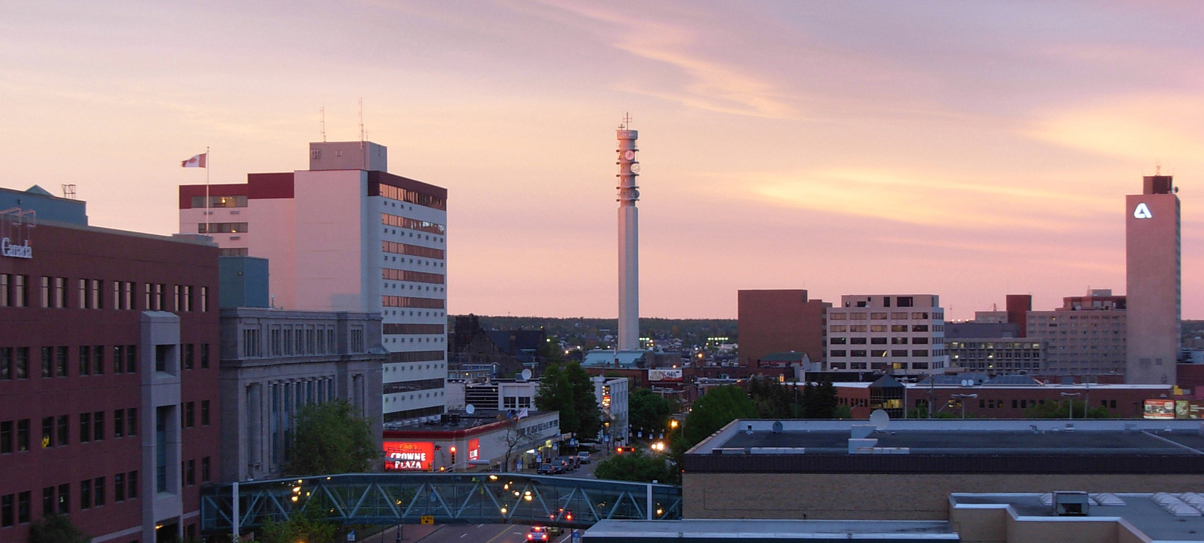
- Downtown Moncton skyline
Interactive Map of Moncton, New Brunswick
Moncton, N.B. CMA
City of Moncton
City of Dieppe
- Coordinates: 46°5′42.2″N 64°45′13.2″W
- Country: Canada
- Province: New Brunswick
- Principal city: Moncton
- Other cities: Dieppe; Riverview

Area (2021)
  - Total: 2,406.31 km^{2} (929.08 sq mi)

Population (2022)
  - CMA: 171,608
  - CMA density: 57.6/km^{2} (149/sq mi)

Gross Metropolitan Product
  - Moncton CMA: CA$8.1 billion (2020)
- Time zone: UTC−4 (AST)
  - Summer (DST): UTC−3 (ADT)

Greater Moncton (French: Grand Moncton) is a census metropolitan area comprising Moncton, Dieppe, and Riverview in New Brunswick, Canada.

== Population ==
Greater Moncton has a population of 157,717 (2021). Migration is mostly from other areas of New Brunswick (especially the north), Nova Scotia (13%), and Ontario (9%). 62% of new arrivals to the city are Anglophone and 38% are Francophone.

The census metropolitan area (CMA) grew by 9% between 2016 and 2021. The census metropolitan area had a population of 157,717 as of the 2021 national census, which makes it the largest metropolitan area in the province of New Brunswick and the second-largest in the Maritime Provinces, after Halifax. The CMA includes the city of Dieppe (population 25,384), the town of Riverview (19,667), Moncton Parish (9,811), Memramcook (4,778), Coverdale Parish (4,466), and Salisbury (2,284).

There are 2,990 Aboriginal people living in Moncton, who make up 4.3% of the city's population. There are 3,305 visible minorities in Moncton. Black peoples and South Asians are the largest visible minority groups, comprising 1.7% and 0.7% of the city's population, respectively. There is also a growing Korean community in Moncton.

== Governance ==
The greater Moncton area contains nine of New Brunswick's 49 provincial electoral districts: Moncton Centre, Moncton East, Moncton South, Moncton Southwest, Moncton Northwest, Dieppe, Shediac Bay-Dieppe, Riverview and Albert. Of the nine members of the Legislative Assembly that represent greater Moncton, five belong to the Liberal party and four belong to the Progressive Conservative party.

The current federal MP for Moncton—Riverview—Dieppe is Ginette Petitpas Taylor (Liberal), as of the 2015 and 2019 federal elections.

== Tourist attractions ==
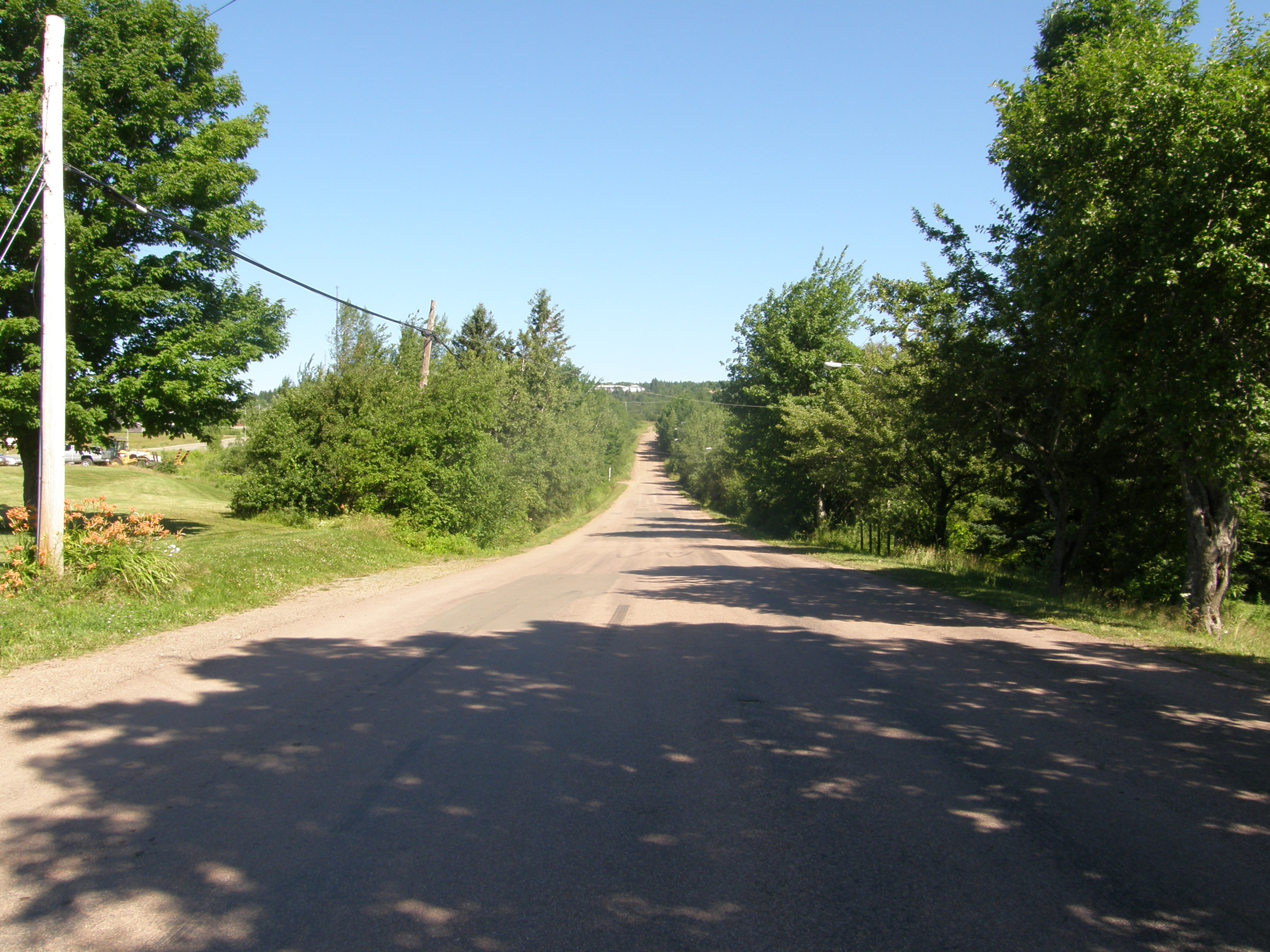
Located in northwestern Moncton, Magnetic Hill is an attraction famous for its gravity hill optical illusion.

Magnetic Hill is on the northwestern outskirts of Moncton and is now the city's most famous attraction. It is a gravity hill optical illusion, where the local topography gives the impression that you are going uphill when in fact you are going downhill.

The "Magnetic Hill Illusion" is a popular tourism draw and both the city and province have built major tourism developments on the surrounding properties to capitalize on this. The complex includes The Magnetic Hill Zoo, a nationally accredited and award-winning zoo with over 400 animals displayed in themed exhibit areas. It is the largest zoo in Atlantic Canada, has well-developed and popular educational program, and was ranked as the fourth best zoo in Canada in 2007. Also on site is Magic Mountain, the largest water park in Atlantic Canada, with a half dozen large water slides, a lazy river, wave pool, children's splash pool, and a 36-hole mini-golf course. An adjacent amusement park is now under construction and will be completed in 2017. The Magnetic Hill Concert Site, a large outdoor concert facility which holds one or two large concerts every year is located nearby. The Rolling Stones performed there in 2005 in front of 85,000 fans. The Eagles played there in the summer of 2008 in front of 55,000 fans. AC/DC and Bon Jovi played at the hill in 2009, with the crowd for the AC/DC concert exceeding 70,000. The Magnetic Hill Concert Site has developed a reputation for holding the largest concert productions in the entire country. U2 played the final concert of their worldwide U2 360° Tour at Magnetic Hill on 30 July 2011. The Casino New Brunswick, which also encompasses a hotel and 2,000 seat entertainment venue also opened at Magnetic Hill in 2010. The performance space at the Casino New Brunswick has already hosted many top acts on the casino circuit.

The main destinations for shopping in Greater Moncton are the Northwest Centre, and the Wheeler Park Power Centre in Moncton, and Champlain Place in Dieppe, which, at 816,000 square feet (75,800 m^{2}), is the largest shopping mall in Atlantic Canada and has over 160 stores and services. The Bass Pro Complex is adjacent to Champlain Place and is co-managed by Cadillac Fairview. It includes a Chapters bookstore, multiplex cinema complex and includes a Bass Pro Shop.

== Sports ==
Greater Moncton has many golfing facilities. There are nine 18-hole golf courses in the census metropolitan area, four of which are residential courses with courseside housing developments either existing or under construction. Both the Royal Oaks and Fox Creek golf clubs can be considered championship courses, with Royal Oaks being the first Rees Jones designed golf course in Canada. Other notable courses include the Moncton Golf & Country Club, Hillsborough Golf Club, Memramcook Valley Golf Club, Maplewood Golf & Country Club and the Mountain Woods Golf Club.

== Metro Moncton government services ==
- Metro Moncton Water and Sewer System – The water system used comes from The Turtle Creek Reservoir.
- Codiac Transpo – Public transit system.

== List of towns, communities and cities ==
City	County	Parish	2016 Census	2011 Census	Change	2010 Land Area	2010 Population Density
Allison	Westmorland County						
Ammon	Westmorland County						
Berry Mills	Westmorland County						
Boundary Creek	Westmorland County						
Canaan	Westmorland County						
Calhoun	Westmorland County						
Cape Breton	Westmorland County						
Coverdale	Albert County						
Colpitts Settlement	Albert County						
Dieppe	Westmorland County			23,310			
Dorchester	Westmorland County			1,167			
Evangeline	Westmorland County						
Five Points							
Gallagher Ridge							
Gautreau Village							
Grub Road							
Indian Mountain							
Irishtown							
Lakeville							
LeBlancville							
Lower Coverdale							
Lower Turtle Creek							
Lutes Mountain							
McQuade							
Meadow Brook							
Melanson Settlement							
Memramcook				4,831			
Middlesex							
Middleton	Westmorland County						
Moncton	71,884			69,074			
New Scotland							
Nixon							
O'Neil							
Pacific Junction							
Painsec							
Pine Glen							
Price							
Riverview				19,128			
Saint-Philippe							
Salisbury				2,208			
Scotch Settlement							
Scoudouc				200			
Shediac				6,053			
Steeves Mills							
Steeves Mountain							
Stilesville							
Stoney Creek							
Synton							
Turtle Creek							
Upper Coverdale							
Weldon							
Metro Moncton				107,086'	'	'	'
Greater Moncton				138,644'	'	'	'

== See also ==
- List of schools in Greater Moncton
- Events in Greater Moncton
- Transportation in Greater Moncton

== Neighbouring regions ==
- Memramcook Region
- Greater Shediac
- Tantramar Region
