= Maple Hills, New Brunswick =

Maple Hills
- Rural community
- Maple Hills Rural Community
- Location within New Brunswick
- Country: Canada
- Province: New Brunswick
- Regional service commission: Southeast
- Incorporated: January 1, 2023
- Seat: Irishtown

Government
  - Type: Mayor–council government
  - Mayor: Erica Warren

Area
  - Total: 522 km^{2} (202 sq mi)

Population (2023)
  - Total: 8,500
- Time zone: UTC-4 (AST)
  - Summer (DST): UTC-3 (ADT)
- Website: maplehills.ca

Maple Hills is an incorporated rural community in the Canadian province of New Brunswick. It was incorporated on January 1, 2023 as part of the 2023 New Brunswick local governance reforms.

== Geography ==
The following populated places are within the Maple Hills Rural Community:

- Ammon
- Berry Mills
- Dundas
- Evangeline
- Gallagher Ridge
- Indian Mountain
- Irishtown
- Lakeville
- Lutes Mountain
- McQuade
- New Scotland
- O'Neil
- Pacific Junction
- Painsec Junction
- Poirier
- Saint-Philippe
- Scotch Settlement
- Shaw Brook
- Stilesville

== Government ==
The council for the Maple Hills Rural Community consists of six members: a mayor elected at-large, one councillor elected by each of the three wards, and two additional councillors elected at-large.

== See also ==
- List of communities in New Brunswick
- List of municipalities in New Brunswick
