= Cape Breton (disambiguation) =

Cape Breton Island is an island in the Canadian province of Nova Scotia, in Canada.

Cape Breton may also refer to:

== Places ==
=== On Cape Breton Island ===
- Cape Breton, a cape at the eastern tip of Cape Breton Island, Canada
- Cape Breton Highlands, a mountain range in the north of Cape Breton Island, Canada
- Cape Breton Highlands National Park
- Cape Breton Regional Municipality, a regional municipality in Nova Scotia
- Cape Breton—Canso, a federal electoral district
  - Cape Breton (federal electoral district), former electoral district (1867 to 1904)

=== Elsewhere in Canada ===
- Cape Breton, New Brunswick

=== In France ===
- Capbreton or Cap Berton, a commune of the Landes département in southwestern France

== Organizations ==
- Cape Breton Eagles, a Sydney-based ice hockey team
- Cape Breton Post
- Cape Breton Development Corporation
- Cape Breton University

== Other uses ==
- Cape Breton and Central Nova Scotia Railway
- Jeanneau Cape Breton, a French sailboat design

== See also ==
- Breton (disambiguation)
- Cape (disambiguation)
