= Greater Lakeburn, New Brunswick =

Community in New Brunswick, Canada

Coordinates: 46.0711813°N 64.6669172°W

Greater Lakeburn was an area with enhanced services within the Canadian local service district of the parish of Moncton in Westmorland County, New Brunswick; it was sometimes erroneously cited as an LSD in its own right. It was situated in Southeastern New Brunswick, to the east of Dieppe. This District contained the southern part of the community of Painsec and Melanson Settlement as well as a mostly treed area. Greater Lakeburn was part of Greater Moncton.

== Demographics ==
In the 2021 Census of Population conducted by Statistics Canada, Greater Lakeburn had a population of 1,529 living in 524 of its 536 total private dwellings, a change of 50.8% from its 2016 population of 1,014. With a land area of 23.07 km^{2} (8.91 sq mi), it had a population density of 66.3/km^{2} (171.7/sq mi) in 2021.

== See also ==
- List of local service districts in New Brunswick
