= O'Neil, New Brunswick =

Community in New Brunswick, Canada

Coordinates: 46.204013°N 64.860964°W

Location of O'Neil in New Brunswick

O'Neil is a Canadian community, located in Westmorland County, New Brunswick. The community is situated in southeastern New Brunswick, to the north of Moncton. O'Neil is part of Greater Moncton.

== See also ==
- List of communities in New Brunswick
- Greater Moncton
- List of entertainment events in Greater Moncton

== Bordering communities ==
- Stilesville
- Shaw Brook
- Indian Mountain
- McQuade
- Ammon
