= Crystal Palace Amusement Park =

Defunct Canadian amusement park

Crystal Palace
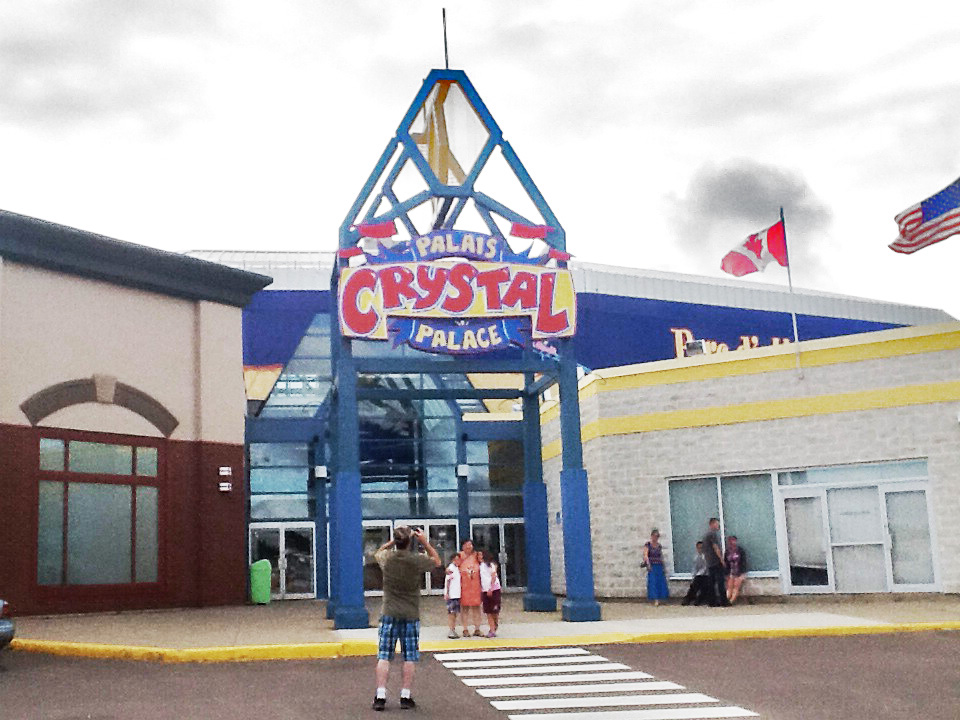
- Crystal Palace in 2014
- Interactive map of Crystal Palace
- Location: Dieppe, New Brunswick, Canada
- Coordinates: 46.098814°N 64.763095°W
- Status: Defunct
- Opened: February 15, 1990
- Closed: September 1, 2014
- Owner: Cadillac Fairview

Attractions
- Total: 14
- Roller coasters: 1

Crystal Palace (French: Palais Crystal) was an indoor amusement park located near Moncton in Dieppe, New Brunswick, Canada. Owned and operated by Cadillac Fairview, the indoor park was situated adjacent to the Champlain Place shopping mall and originally opened to the public on February 15, 1990. It was part of a larger complex that included the Ramada Plaza Crystal Palace Hotel and Convention Centre, as well as other shops and restaurants.

On July 31, 2014, Cadillac Fairview announced that Crystal Palace would be permanently closing on September 1, 2014, to make way for New Brunswick's first Bass Pro Shops store.

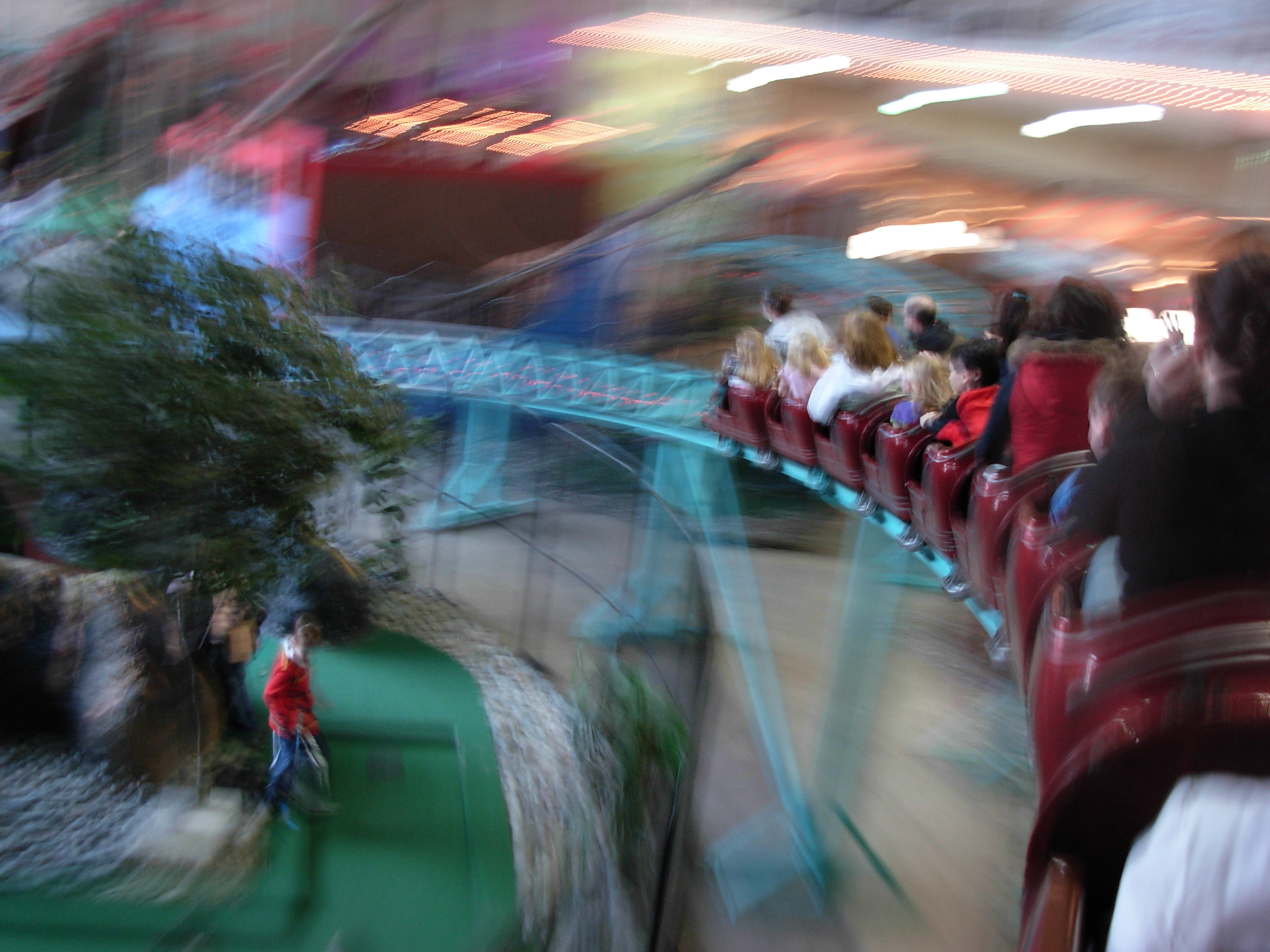
The Bullet roller coaster

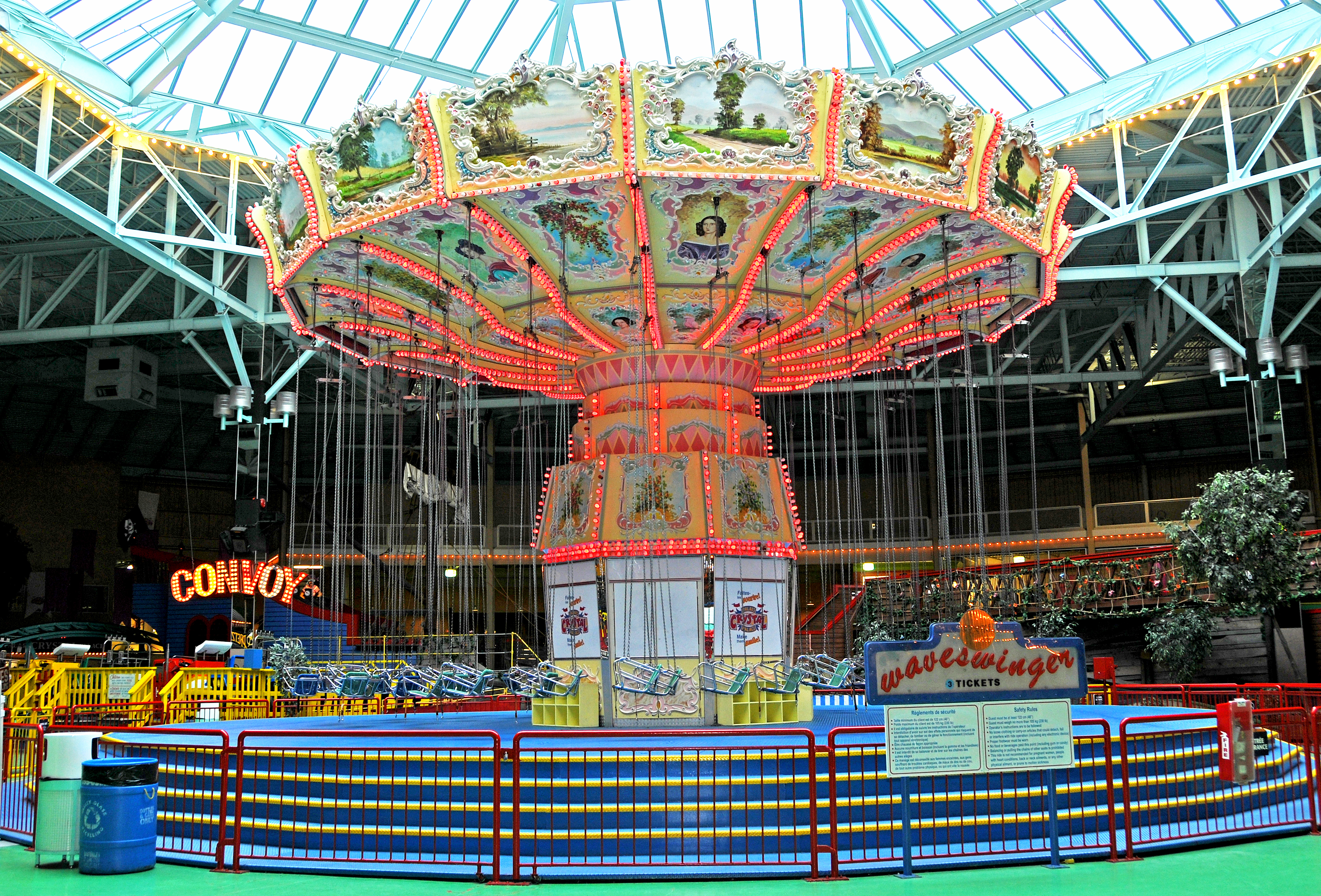
The Wave Swinger

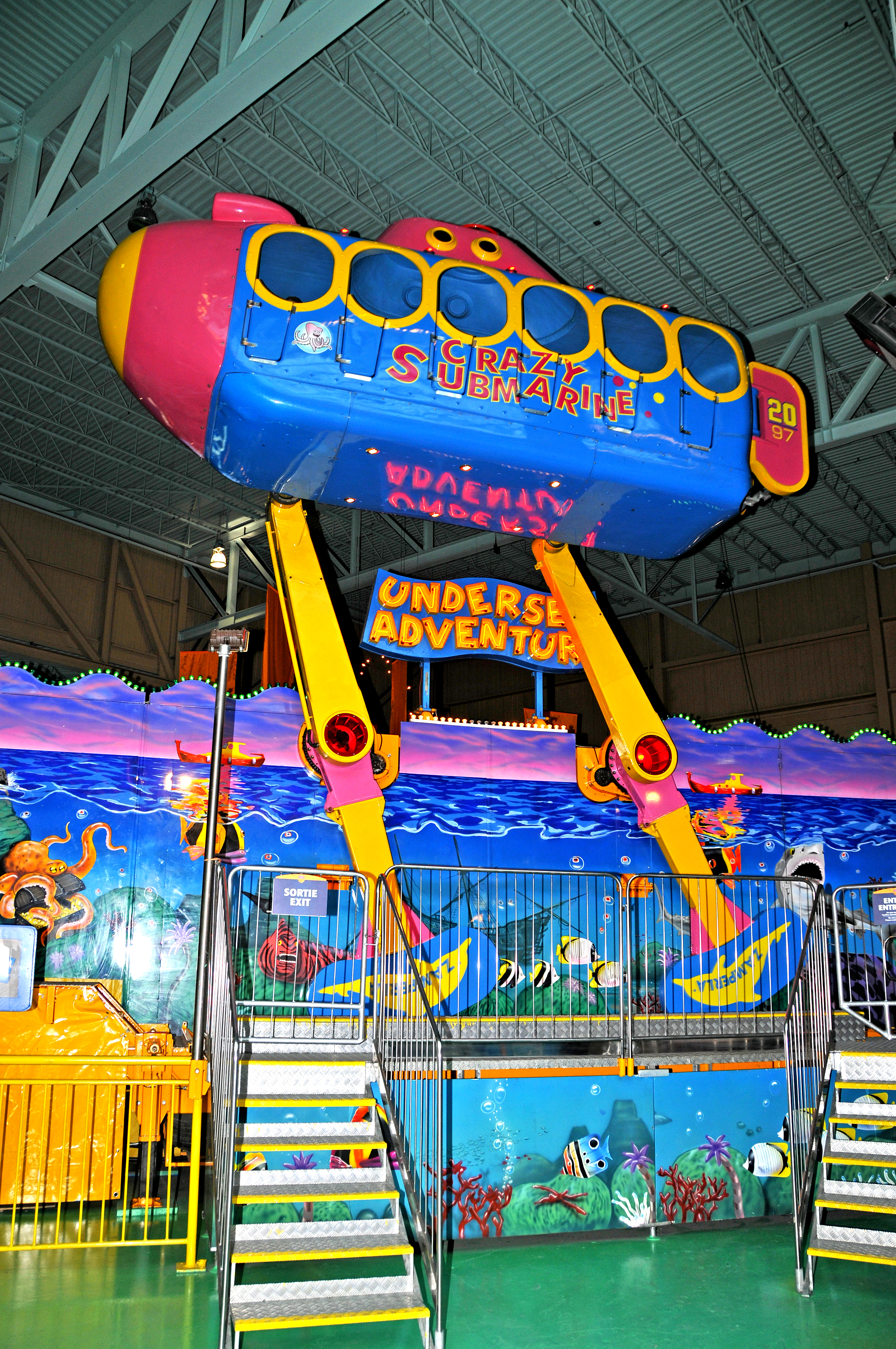
The Crazy Submarine

== Information ==
The park was opened on February 15, 1990. In 1998 the Park was purchased by Cadillac Fairview. The Crystal Palace was considered to be one of the largest amusements indoors in the Canadian Provinces. This amusement park was also in the same building as Cineplex Cinemas, the Chapters bookstore, the Starbucks Café and the Ramada Plaza Hotel. This amusement park included 14 rides and an arcade. This amusement park was located on 499 Paul Street Dieppe, New Brunswick, Canada. In 2015 the Bullet roller coaster was relocated to the Shining Waters amusement park in Cavendish, Prince Edward Island. Several other rides were relocated to Moncton's Magic Mountain water park.

== Attractions ==
The Crystal Palace Amusement Park included 14 rides that included:

- Carousel
- Sky Flyer
- Pirate's Cove Mini Golf
- Wave Swinger
- Convoy
- Jumpin' Star
- Tree House
- Crazy Submarine
- Climbing Wall
- Rio Grande
- Red Baron
- Krazy Kars
- Bullet
- Lazer Runner

== Token ==
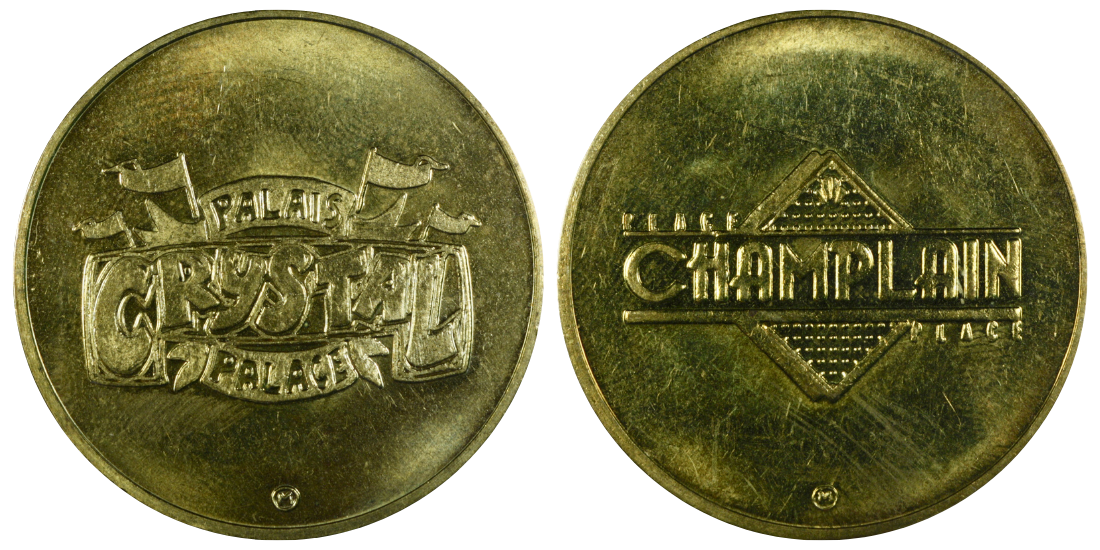
Crystal Palace Token

Crystal Palace game tokens are 25 mm diameter and brass.

== See also ==
- Bass Pro Complex, which replaced the amusement park
