= Steeves Mountain, New Brunswick =

Community in New Brunswick, Canada

Coordinates: 46.086091°N 65.001125°W

Steeves Mountain is a community in the Canadian province of New Brunswick, located in Westmorland County. The Community is situated in southeastern New Brunswick, to the west of Moncton. Steeves Mountain is part of Greater Moncton.

== Bordering communities ==
- Boundary Creek, New Brunswick
- Gallagher Ridge, New Brunswick
- Berry Mills, New Brunswick
- Moncton, New Brunswick
- Second North River, New Brunswick

== See also ==
- List of communities in New Brunswick
