= Charles LeBlanc =

Canadian blogger and political activist (born 1959)

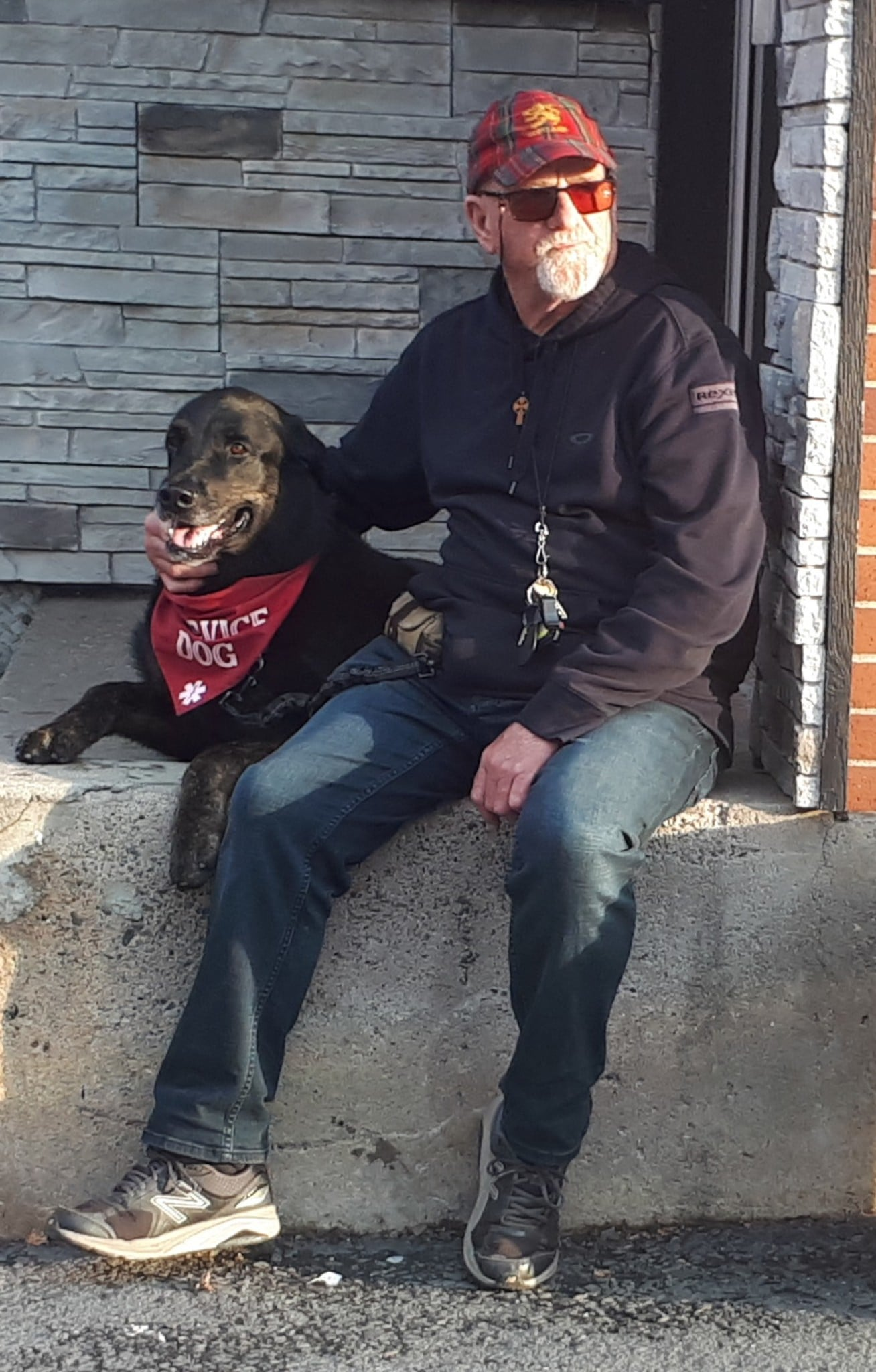
- LeBlanc and his dog, Deogy, in 2024
- Born: Charles Donald LeBlanc; August 1, 1959 (age 67); College Bridge, New Brunswick, Canada
- Website: charlesotherpersonalitie.blogspot.com

Charles Donald LeBlanc (born August 1, 1959) is a Canadian blogger and political activist based in Fredericton, New Brunswick.

== Early life and career ==
Charles Donald LeBlanc was originally from College Bridge (now part of Memramcook), New Brunswick, and was the oldest of two brothers and one sister. In 1978, he graduated from École Mathieu-Martin, a francophone high school in Dieppe. In his late teens, LeBlanc was a long-distance cycler which between June 23, 1978 and January 1979, bearing the nickname "10-Speed Charlie", he cycled from Halifax, Nova Scotia through the United States East Coast to Florida, then along the Southern United States before finishing in Sacramento, California, on a Optimist International-sponsored trek covering 9,000 miles (14,000 km) before retiring from cycling at the age of 19.

In the early 1980s, he began working for Saint John Shipbuilding, spending the next 18 years working as a labourer. Throughout the 1990s, LeBlanc frequently wrote letters to the editors of the Saint John newspaper Saint John Times Globe.

== Blogging and activism ==
=== Activism ===
LeBlanc vehemently opposed the New Brunswick Confederation of Regions Party (CoR) for their anti-bilingual sentiment. In November 1991, he disrupted the New Brunswick Confederation of Regions Party's annual meeting in Saint John in response to CoR leader Danny Cameron's suggestion that the Acadian flag be removed from the legislature.

In June 2003, LeBlanc started a protest camp outside of the New Brunswick Legislative Building in Fredericton, where for the next six months he spent living in a tent to protest excessive use of Ritalin to treat children with attention deficit hyperactivity disorder (ADHD). His protest, during which he received 10,000 signatures, finished in December 2003.

=== Blogging ===
According to LeBlanc, he was introduced to blogging by benefactors who provided him with a computer and a digital camera. On June 9, 2006, LeBlanc went to Saint John to document a group of people protesting against a conference related to trade between Atlantic Canada and New England, where he was arrested by Saint John Police Force officers, and was charged with obstructing an officer. During the incident, authorities seized his camera and deleted photos on it. In response, LeBlanc filed a complaint against the police force. Later that month, he was banned from the property of the legislative building by a committee of provincial legislature members, who alleged that he harassed legislative staff. In November 2006, the charge against LeBlanc in relation to the incident in Saint John was dismissed in court, where it was also found that the Saint John Police Force's actions were unwarranted.

On January 19, 2012, Fredericton City Police officers raided LeBlanc's apartment and charged him with libel under Section 301 of the Criminal Code of Canada in connection with a 2011 blog post about one of their officers. In response, the Canadian Civil Liberties Association wrote a letter to Fredericton Police Chief Barry MacKnight questioning the force's treatment of LeBlanc. Fredericton Mayor Brad Woodside also expressed disagreement with the police force's handling of the situation. In May 2012, the provincial government announced that the charges against LeBlanc would not proceed under consensus that Section 301 was unconstitutional. LeBlanc's blog was eventually taken down by Google on August 18, 2014, after receiving a complaint from Fredericton Chief Administrative Officer Chris MacPherson regarding LeBlanc's content about the police force. He was arrested in November 2016 under libel charges for a second time, which were again not approved by the Crown in May 2017.

External videos
- LeBlanc's video featuring Raymond, who carried out the Fredericton mass shooting the following year

On June 3, 2017, LeBlanc filmed a video interviewing a man later identified as Matthew Raymond, who, in 2018, carried out a mass shooting in Fredericton, killing four people, including two police officers. In the video, Raymond was seen protesting outside of the legislative building and making inflammatory statements about Muslim immigrants, wearing a sandwich board reading "No Sharia Law". LeBlanc pressed Raymond on the validity of his claims and asked if he had a mental illness.

== Personal life ==
LeBlanc has ADHD, which has been one of the focal points of his blogging, along with poverty.
