= Saint-Paul Parish, New Brunswick =

Saint-Paul St. Paul
- Parish
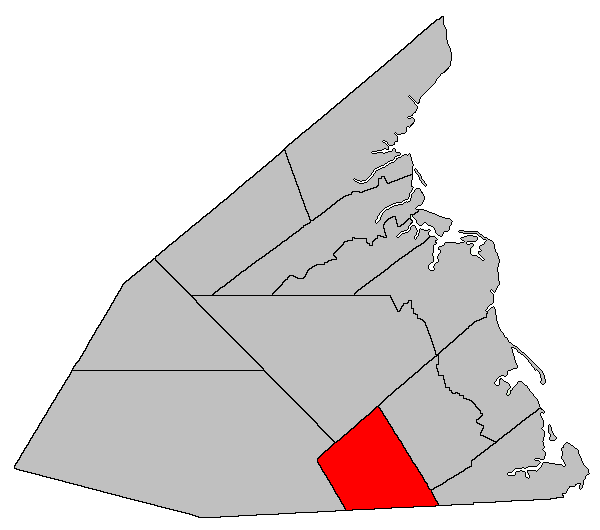
- Location within Kent County, New Brunswick.
- Coordinates: 46.3275°N 65.0175°W
- Country: Canada
- Province: New Brunswick
- County: Kent County
- Erected: 1888

Area
  - Land: 228.41 km^{2} (88.19 sq mi)

Population (2021)
  - Total: 877
  - Density: 3.8/km^{2} (9.8/sq mi)
  - Change 2016-2021: ▲4.2%
  - Dwellings: 383
- Time zone: UTC-4 (AST)
  - Summer (DST): UTC-3 (ADT)

Saint-Paul is a geographic parish in Kent County, New Brunswick, Canada. (Note: The Territorial Division Act divides the province into 152 parishes, the cities of Saint John and Fredericton, and one town of Grand Falls. The Interpretation Act clarifies that parishes include any local government within their borders.)

For governance purposes, most of the parish is within the town of Champdoré, with a strip along the northern boundary in the village of Five Rivers and the southeastern corner part of the incorporated rural community of Maple Hills. Champdoré and Five Rivers belong to the Kent Regional Service Commission, while Maple Hills belongs to the Southeast RSC.

Prior to the 2023 governance reform, the parish formed the local service district of the parish of Saint-Paul.

== Origin of name ==
The parish may have taken its name from the Roman Catholic ecclesiastical parish.

== History ==
Saint-Paul was erected in 1888 from all of Sainte-Marie Parish west of McLaughlin Road.

== Boundaries ==
Saint-Paul Parish is bounded:

- on the north by the prolongation of a line running south 68º west (Note: By the magnet of 1850, when declination in the area was between 21º and 22º west of north.) from the mouth of the Rivière Chockpish-nord to the Canadian National Railway line running alongside Route 126;
- on the east by Route 490;
- on the south by the Westmorland County line;
- on the west by the CNR line running alongside Route 126.

== Governance ==
The entire parish forms the local service district of the parish of Saint-Paul, (Note: The name was originally styled Saint Paul; this was changed to the modern form in 1985. The French name was in the modern style when the LSD regulation was made bilingual in 1984.) established in 1966 to assess for fire protection. Community services were added in 1987, recreational and sports facilities in 2008, and non-fire related rescue in 2015. First aid and ambulance services (1982–2008) were formerly included.

== Communities ==
Communities at least partly within the parish; italics indicate a name no longer in official use

- Birch Ridge
- Bon-Secours
- Gladeside
- Hébert
- Légerville
- McLean Settlement
- Saint-Paul

- Sweeneyville
- Terrains de L'Évêque
- Val-Richard
- Village-des-Belliveau
- Village-des-Cormier
- Village-des-Léger

== Bodies of water ==
Bodies of water (Note: Not including brooks, ponds or coves.) at least partly in the parish:

- Buctouche River
- Cocagne River
- Lac de Bon-Secours

== Other notable places ==
Parks, historic sites, and other noteworthy places at least partly in the parish.

- McLean Settlement Protected Natural Area

== Demographics ==
=== Population ===
Population trend

Census	Population	Change (%)
2016	842	▼2.8%
2011	866	▲0.9%
2006	858	▼9.8%
2001	951	▼3.0%
1996	980	▼3.3%
1991	1,013	N/A

=== Language ===
Mother tongue (2016)

Language	Population	Pct (%)
French only	485	57.7%
English only	345	41.1%
Both English and French	5	0.6%
Other languages	5	0.6%

== See also ==
- List of parishes in New Brunswick
