= Alex DesRoches =

Canadian basketball player

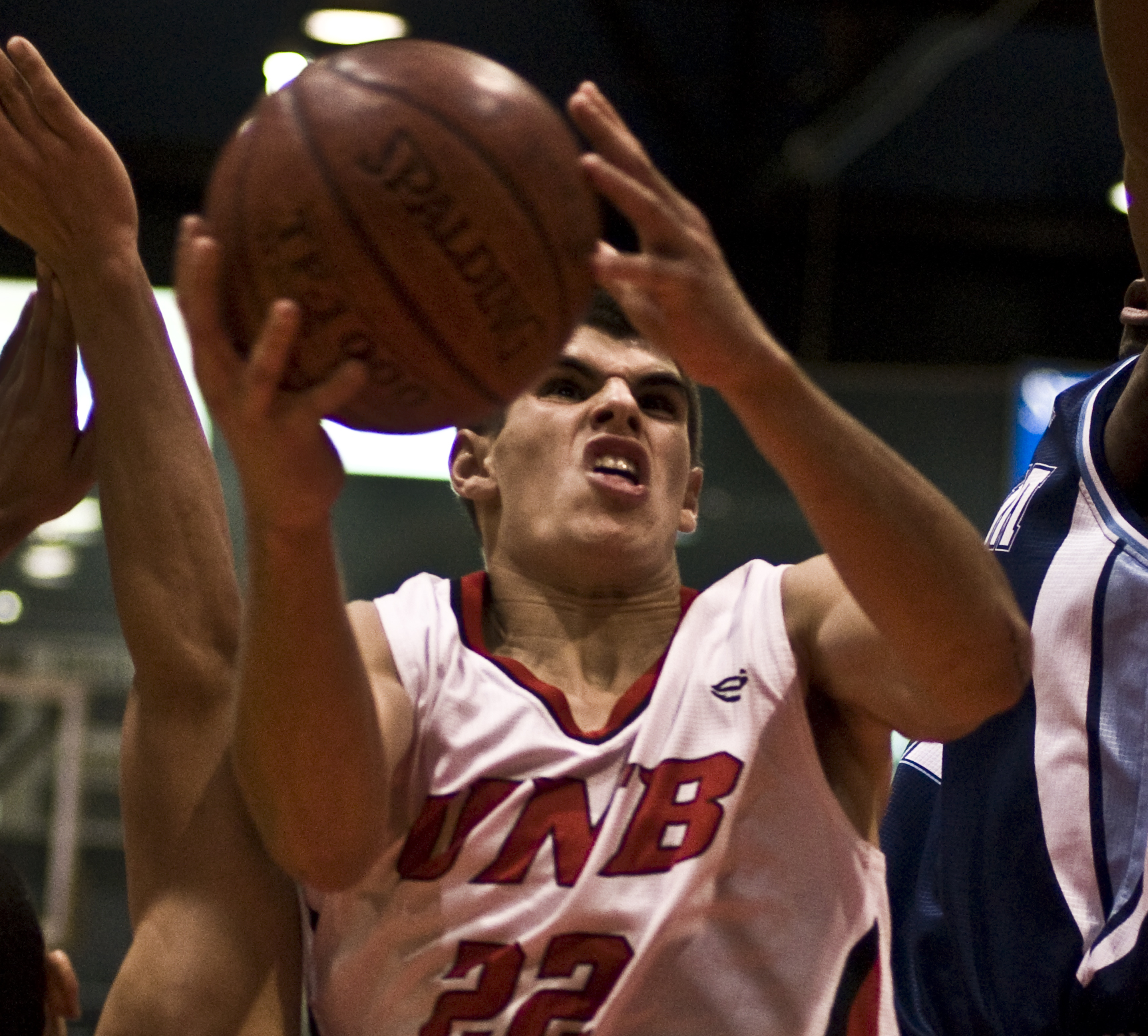
- DesRoches at UNB

Free agent
- Position: Shooting guard / small forward

Personal information
- Born: June 16, 1988 (age 38) Dieppe, New Brunswick
- Listed height: 6 ft 4 in (1.93 m)
- Listed weight: 200 lb (91 kg)

Career information
- High school: Mathieu-Martin (Dieppe, New Brunswick)
- College: UNB (2008–2012)
- NBA draft: 2012: undrafted
- Playing career: 2012–present

Career history
- 2012–2013: Ipswich Force
- 2013–2014: Moncton Miracles
- 2014–2016: Island Storm

Alexander Paul DesRoches (born June 16, 1988) is a Canadian professional basketball player who last played for the Island Storm of the National Basketball League of Canada (NBL Canada). He played college basketball for the University of New Brunswick.
