= List of highways numbered 485 =

Route 485, or Highway 485, can refer to:

== Canada ==
- Manitoba Provincial Road 485
- New Brunswick Route 485

== Ireland ==
- R485 regional road

== Japan ==
- Japan National Route 485

== United States ==
- Interstate 485 (North Carolina)
- Interstate 485 (Georgia) (proposed)
- County Road 485 (Hernando County, Florida)
- Maryland Route 485
- Mississippi Highway 485
- Nevada State Route 485 (former)
- New Mexico State Road 485
- Puerto Rico Highway 485
- Texas:
  - Farm to Market Road 485
  - Texas State Highway Loop 485

Preceded by 484	Lists of highways 485	Succeeded by 486
