= Saint Paul Parish =

Saint Paul Parish may refer to:

- Saint Paul Parish, Antigua and Barbuda
- Saint Paul Parish, Dominica
- Saint Paul Parish, Tobago
- Saint-Paul Parish, New Brunswick
