= Maillet =

Maillet may refer to:

== People ==
- Andrée Maillet (1921–1995), Quebec writer
- Antonine Maillet (1929–2025), Acadian novelist and playwright
- Benoît de Maillet (1656–1738), French diplomat
- Eddy Maillet (born 1967), Seychellois football referee
- Jacques Maillet (1926–2019), French rower
- Jacques-Léonard Maillet (1823–1894), French academic sculptor
- Nathalie Maillet (1970–2021), French architect and racecar driver
- Philippe Maillet (born 1992), Canadian ice hockey player
- Quentin Fillon Maillet (born 1992), French biathlete
- Robert Maillet (born 1969), Canadian actor and retired professional wrestler

== Places ==
- Maillet, Allier, a former commune in the department of Allier
- Maillet, Indre, a commune in the department of Indre
- Mailly-Maillet, a commune in the department of Somme

== Other uses ==
- Maillet's determinant, in mathematics
- SFCA Maillet, range of aeroplane models
