= Saint-Philippe, New Brunswick =

Coordinates: 46.215595°N 64.692092°W

Saint-Philippe is a populated place in Westmorland County, New Brunswick. Since 2023, Saint-Philippe has been incorporated into the rural community of Maple Hills. It is part of Greater Moncton.

== See also ==
- List of communities in New Brunswick
