= List of highways numbered 486 =

The following highways are numbered 486:

== Ireland ==
- R486 regional road

== Japan ==
- Japan National Route 486

== United States ==
- LA 486
- PR-486
- FM 486

Preceded by 485	Lists of highways 486	Succeeded by 487
