= Haut-Bocage =

- Commune
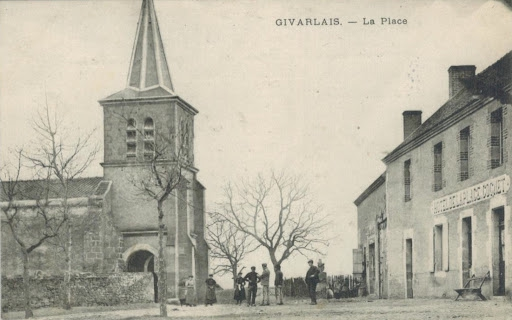
- 1920s era post card from Givarlais (delegated commune)
- Location of Haut-Bocage
- Location within France Location within Auvergne-Rhône-Alpes
- Coordinates: 46°28′44″N 2°39′07″E
- Country: France
- Region: Auvergne-Rhône-Alpes
- Department: Allier
- Arrondissement: Montluçon
- Canton: Huriel
- Intercommunality: CC du Val de Cher

Government
  - Mayor (2026–32): Thierry De Lamarliere
- Area^{1}: 70.64 km^{2} (27.27 sq mi)
- Population (2023): 841
  - Density: 11.9/km^{2} (30.8/sq mi)
- Time zone: UTC+01:00 (CET)
  - Summer (DST): UTC+02:00 (CEST)
- INSEE/Postal code: 03158 /03190
- ^{1} French Land Register data, which excludes lakes, ponds, glaciers > 1 km^{2} (0.386 sq mi or 247 acres) and river estuaries.

Haut-Bocage (French pronunciation: [o bɔkaʒ]; Occitan: Aut Boschatge) is a commune in the Allier department of central France. The municipality was established on 1 January 2016 and consists of the former communes of Maillet, Givarlais and Louroux-Hodement.

== Politics and administration ==
The mayors of the former communes of Maillet, Givarlais and Louroux-Hodement are by right delegated mayors for each of their respective communes.

List of delegated communes of Haut-Bocage
Delegated commune	INSEE code	Intercommunality	Area (km^{2})	Population (2014)	Density (per km^{2})
Maillet (seat)	03158	CC du Val de Cher	26.61	896	34
Givarlais	03123	CC du Val de Cher	14.85	246	17
Louroux-Hodement	03153	CC du Val de Cher	29.18	343	12

== Population ==
Population data refer to the commune in its geography as of January 2025.

Historical population
Year	Pop.	±% p.a.
1968	1,080	—
1975	947	−1.86%
1982	838	−1.73%
1990	840	+0.03%
1999	842	+0.03%
2007	968	+1.76%
2012	945	−0.48%
2017	888	−1.24%
2023	841	−0.90%
Source: INSEE

== See also ==
- Communes of the Allier department
- List of new French communes created in 2016
