= List of highways numbered 487 =

The following highways are numbered 487:

== Brazil ==
- SP-487

== Canada ==
- Manitoba Provincial Road 487

== Japan ==
- Japan National Route 487

== United States ==
- Interstate 487 (cancelled proposal)
- Nevada State Route 487
- Pennsylvania Route 487
- Puerto Rico Highway 487
- Farm to Market Road 487
- Wyoming Highway 487

Preceded by 486	Lists of highways 487	Succeeded by 488
