= Louroux-Hodement =

- Part of Haut-Bocage
- Location of Louroux-Hodement
- Location within France Location within Auvergne-Rhône-Alpes
- Coordinates: 46°27′42″N 2°42′53″E
- Country: France
- Region: Auvergne-Rhône-Alpes
- Department: Allier
- Arrondissement: Montluçon
- Canton: Huriel
- Commune: Haut-Bocage
- Area^{1}: 29.18 km^{2} (11.27 sq mi)
- Elevation: 287 m (942 ft)
- Highest elevation: 338 m (1,109 ft)
- Lowest elevation: 229 m (751 ft)
- Population (2021): 368
  - Density: 12.6/km^{2} (32.7/sq mi)
- Time zone: UTC+01:00 (CET)
  - Summer (DST): UTC+02:00 (CEST)
- Postal code: 03190
- ^{1} French Land Register data, which excludes lakes, ponds, glaciers > 1 km^{2} (0.386 sq mi or 247 acres) and river estuaries.

Louroux-Hodement is a former commune in the Allier department in central France. On 1 January 2016, it was merged into the new commune Haut-Bocage.

== Population ==
Historical population
Year	Pop.	±% p.a.
2006	356	—
2011	344	−0.68%
2021	368	+0.68%
Source: INSEE

== See also ==
- Communes of the Allier department
