= Magnetic Hill Concert Site =

Live music venue in Moncton, New Brunswick, Canada

Coordinates: 46.144504°N 64.875920°W

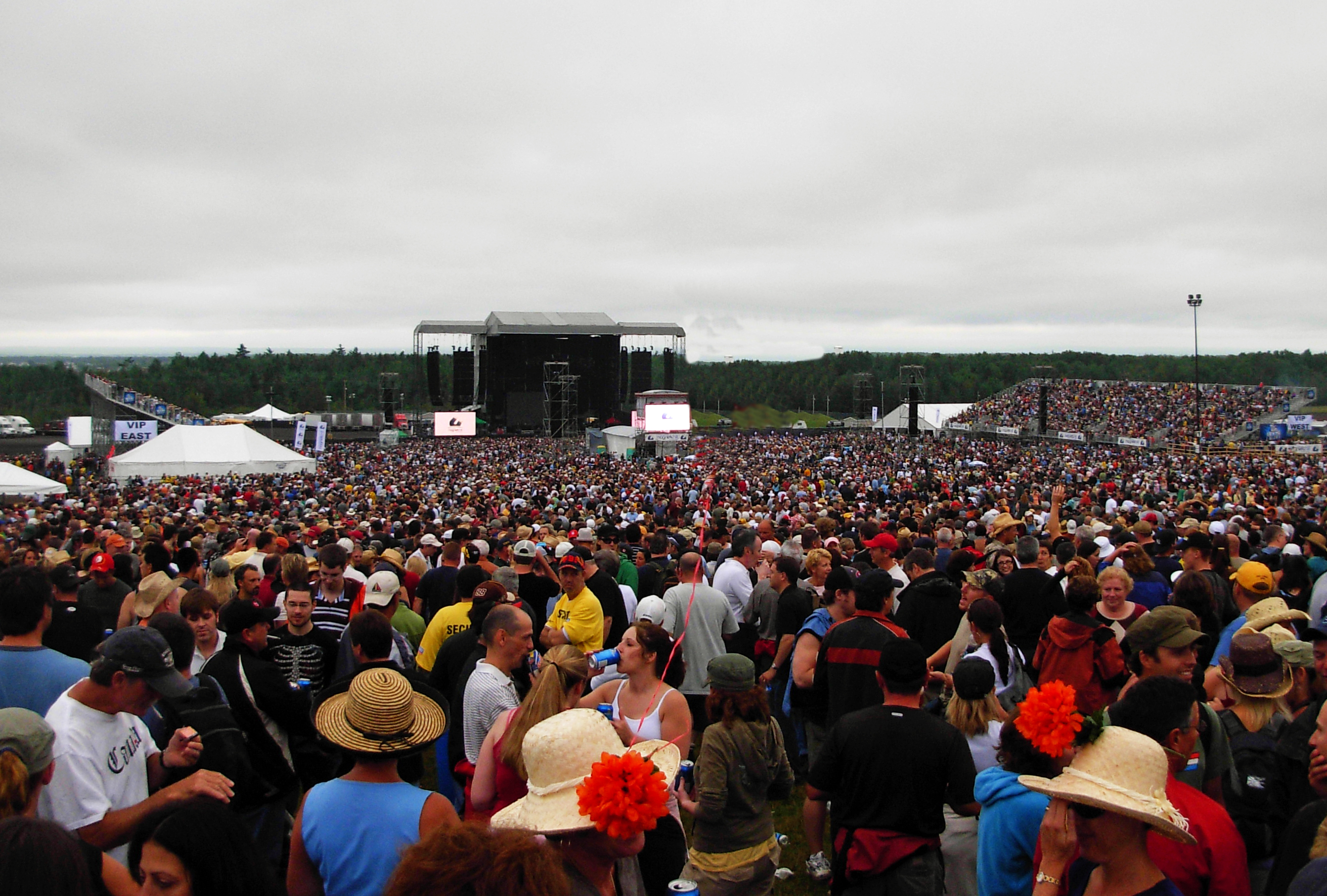
Eagles concert held at Magnetic Hill was the largest event on their tour for 2008 with over 45,000 fans in attendance

Magnetic Hill Concert Site is a live music venue in Moncton, New Brunswick, Canada. It is one of the largest music venues in Canada.

Originally built in 1984 for Pope John Paul II to hold a papal mass during his tour of Canada, the site was redesigned in the 1990s as a concert venue. The site has hosted annual or biennial summer concerts since the mid-2000s. Additional permanent infrastructure was installed following the 2005 concert headlined by The Rolling Stones. In 2011 a concert headlined by U2 saw the first use of the marketing term Magnetic Hill Music Festival.

Past Events
Year	Event name	Artist	Attendance
1984	Papal Visit	Pope John Paul II	75,000
1998	Classic Rock Festival	Lynyrd Skynyrd, Foreigner, Peter Frampton, Steppenwolf, Heart, Pat Benatar	35,000
2005	A Bigger Bang	The Rolling Stones	89,260
2006	Country Rocks The Hill	Brooks & Dunn, Alan Jackson	45,000
2008	Soul2Soul II Tour	Faith Hill and Tim McGraw	50,000
2008	Long Road Out of Eden Tour	Eagles	45,923
2009	Bon Jovi		33,000
2009	Black Ice World Tour	AC/DC	70,000
2011	U2 360° Tour	U2	66,823
2012	Here And Now Tour	Nickelback	25,000
2012	Wrecking Ball Tour	Bruce Springsteen	30,200
2015	Rock or Bust World Tour	AC/DC	50,000
2019	Luke Bryan		25,000

== See also ==
- List of events in Greater Moncton
- Magnetic Hill
- Strawberry Fields, a proposed rock festival to be held in Greater Moncton in 1970
