= Painsec, New Brunswick =

Community in Westmorland County, Canada

Coordinates: 46.0780954°N 64.641716°W

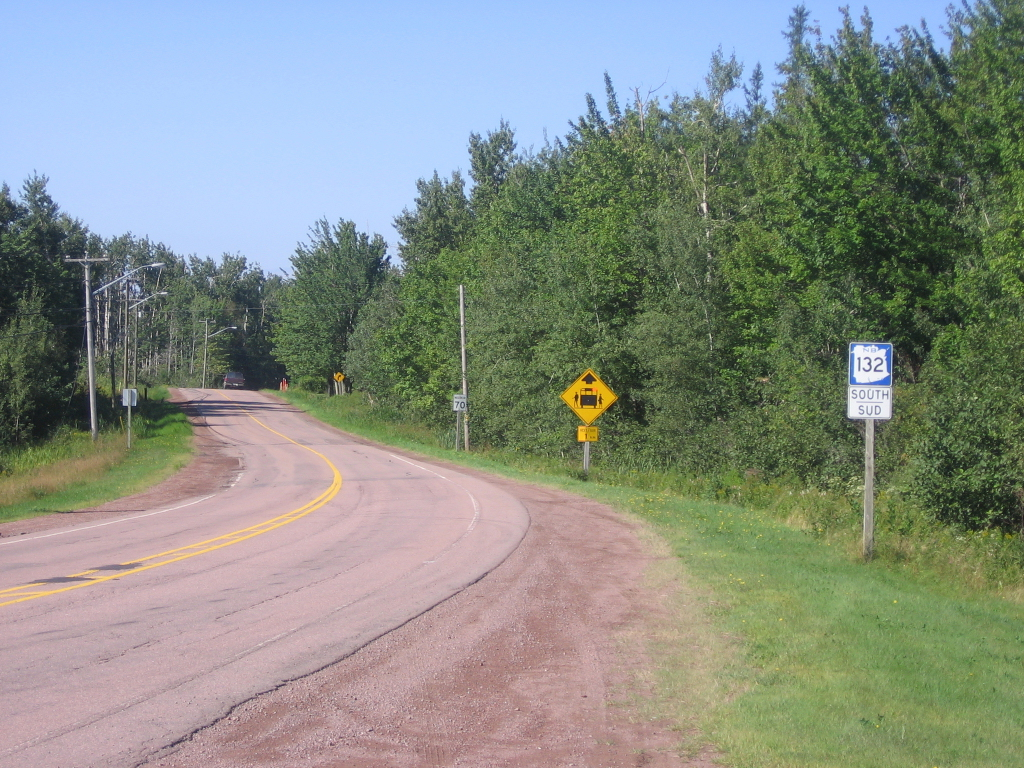
Road in New Brunswick

Painsec is an unincorporated community in Westmorland County, New Brunswick. The community is situated in Southeastern New Brunswick, to the east of Moncton. This community is partially located within the city of Dieppe. Painsec is part of Greater Moncton, and part of the Local Service District of Greater Lakeburn.

== See also ==
- List of communities in New Brunswick
