= École Mathieu-Martin =

Location
- 511 Champlain St. Dieppe, New Brunswick, E1A 1P2; Canada; 46°05′59″N 64°44′03″W

Information
- School type: High School
- Founded: 1971
- School board: Francophone Sud
- Principal: Nicole LeBlanc
- Grades: 9-12
- Enrollment: 1379+
- Language: French
- Area: Dieppe and surrounding district
- Colours: Blue and Gold
- Mascot: Matador
- Team name: Matadors (boys); Vedettes (girls)
- Website: ecole.district1.nbed.nb.ca/ecole-mathieu-martin/

École Mathieu-Martin is a Francophone high school located on Champlain Street in Dieppe, New Brunswick, Canada. With an enrollment of over 1379, the school is the largest of the French-language high schools in the Moncton area. It mostly serves the francophone students of the city of Dieppe and the village of Memramcook, New Brunswick. In addition, it is the largest francophone Secondary school in Atlantic Canada.

== History ==
École Mathieu-Martin opened in 1972 to alleviate the overcrowding of École Vanier the premier French-language high school in Moncton. École Secondaire Vanier, built in 1963 to accommodate 600 students, had over fifteen mobile classrooms attached to its structure with an overflowed student population roster of 1200 in 1970. With the inauguration of the new high school in Dieppe, Vanier morphed into a francophone junior high school (7-9). Presiding as the principal for both secondary schools, Dollard LeBlanc would retire in 1990 at Mathieu-Martin.

Before 1970, School District 15 administered anglophone and francophone schools in the Moncton area and considered a bilingual high school system housed under the same complex in Moncton. This concept would have had accommodated over 5000 students with separate linguistic curriculum but integration for common areas. With the prevalence of francophone students being vulnerable to assimilation within this design, educators and concerned parents alike sternly condemned the unification proposition, which would be a backlash to the minority language and Acadian communities of the province. Hence, Mathieu Martin would be inaugurated as part of the expanded francophone administered School District 13 at its inception.

Mathieu-Martin is named for the first child born of French parents in LaHave (La Hève), Acadia in 1636. He founded Cobequid, now called Masstown, in the province of Nova Scotia in 1689 and died, unmarried, in 1724.

== International Baccalaureate ==
Mathieu-Martin is one of the two French school in the province that offers the International Baccalaureate program, and one of two in Atlantic Canada, the other being in Nova Scotia. The program, based on a challenging curriculum, extends from Grade 9 to Grade 12. In grades 9 and 10, the enrolled take introductory courses to prepare them for the 11 and 12 grades. Mathieu-Martin offers IB courses in French, English and History at high level and in Mathematics, Chemistry and Physics at standard level. Diploma candidates are also required to complete the Theory of Knowledge course, the extended essay and the CAS hours.

== Athletics ==
The school participates in almost every New Brunswick Interscholastic Athletic Association (NBIAA) sport including junior and senior soccer, badminton, field hockey, rugby, football, track and field, softball, baseball, hockey, senior basketball, golf, curling and volleyball.

== Notable alumni ==
- Alex DesRoches, basketball player
- Julie Doiron, musician
- Charles LeBlanc, blogger and political activist
- Bernard Lord (1981-1982), former Premier (1999-2006) and leader of the Progressive Conservative party of New Brunswick.
- Sami Landri, drag queen
- Charlie Gillespie, actor

== See also ==
- École L'Odyssée
- List of schools in New Brunswick
