= Jonathan Berry (pioneer) =

Settler and businessman

Jonathan Berry (1787 – 26 August 1878) was a settler and businessman in New Brunswick, Canada.

Berry emigrated in 1826 and by 1840, he was well established as a pioneer settler. He added land and a water-driven sawmill to his endeavors. The mill began to make a lasting impact on the economy of the region. Lumber was supplied for local construction, shipbuilding and the railroads. A grist mill was also added.

The community of Berry Mills, New Brunswick grew out of Berry's efforts and stands as an important reminder of the pioneer in the development of the country.
