= Givarlais =

- Part of Haut-Bocage
- Location of Givarlais
- Location within France Location within Auvergne-Rhône-Alpes
- Coordinates: 46°27′34″N 2°38′56″E
- Country: France
- Region: Auvergne-Rhône-Alpes
- Department: Allier
- Arrondissement: Montluçon
- Canton: Huriel
- Commune: Haut-Bocage
- Area^{1}: 14.85 km^{2} (5.73 sq mi)
- Elevation: 247 m (810 ft)
- Highest elevation: 359 m (1,178 ft)
- Lowest elevation: 205 m (673 ft)
- Population (2021): 203
  - Density: 13.7/km^{2} (35.4/sq mi)
- Time zone: UTC+01:00 (CET)
  - Summer (DST): UTC+02:00 (CEST)
- Postal code: 03190
- ^{1} French Land Register data, which excludes lakes, ponds, glaciers > 1 km^{2} (0.386 sq mi or 247 acres) and river estuaries.

Givarlais (French pronunciation: [ʒivaʁlɛ]; Occitan: Givarlés) is a former commune in the Allier department in central France. On 1 January 2016, it was merged into the new commune Haut-Bocage.

== Population ==
Historical population
Year	Pop.	±% p.a.
2006	241	—
2011	248	+0.57%
2021	203	−1.98%
Source: INSEE

== See also ==
- Communes of the Allier department
