= Maillet, Allier =

Maillet
- Part of Haut-Bocage
- Location of Maillet
- Location within France Location within Auvergne-Rhône-Alpes
- Coordinates: 46°28′47″N 2°39′10″E
- Country: France
- Region: Auvergne-Rhône-Alpes
- Department: Allier
- Arrondissement: Montluçon
- Canton: Huriel
- Commune: Haut-Bocage
- Area^{1}: 26.61 km^{2} (10.27 sq mi)
- Elevation: 300 m (980 ft)
- Highest elevation: 323 m (1,060 ft)
- Lowest elevation: 182 m (597 ft)
- Population (2021): 284
  - Density: 10.7/km^{2} (27.6/sq mi)
- Time zone: UTC+01:00 (CET)
  - Summer (DST): UTC+02:00 (CEST)
- Postal code: 03190
- ^{1} French Land Register data, which excludes lakes, ponds, glaciers > 1 km^{2} (0.386 sq mi or 247 acres) and river estuaries.

Maillet (Auvergnat: Malhet) is a former commune in the Allier department in central France. On 1 January 2016, it was merged into the new commune Haut-Bocage.

== Population ==
Historical population
Year	Pop.	±% p.a.
2006	373	—
2011	373	+0.00%
2021	284	−2.69%
Source: INSEE

== See also ==
- Communes of the Allier department
