= New Brunswick Route 128 =

Highway in New Brunswick, Canada

Route 128

Route information
- Maintained by New Brunswick Department of Transportation
- Length: 11.82 km (7.34 mi)
- Existed: 1965–present

Major junctions
- East end: Route 126 in Lutes Mountain
- Route 2 (TCH) in Berry Mills
- West end: Route 15 in Moncton

Location
- Country: Canada
- Province: New Brunswick
- Major cities: Moncton

Highway system
- Provincial highways in New Brunswick; Former routes
← Route 127	→ Route 130

Route 128 is a provincial highway in the Canadian province of New Brunswick. The highway starts in Lutes Mountain as Homestead Road at Route 126. The road travels in a horseshoe pattern through two small communities before ending in the city of Moncton at an interchange with Route 15 (Wheeler Boulevard). In the community of Berry Mills, New Brunswick, the road is called Berry Mills Road and in Moncton, Route 128 is also designated Killam Drive.

== Major intersections ==
The entire route is in Westmorland County.

Location	km	mi	Destinations	Notes
Lutes Mountain	0.0	0.0	Route 126 to Route 2 (TCH) east – Moncton, Miramichi	
Berry Mills	3.0– 3.8	1.9– 2.4	Homestead Road	Partial cloverleaf interchange
Berry Mills	4.9	3.0	Route 2 (TCH) – Saint John, Fredericton, Sackville	Exit 446 (TCH 2)
Moncton	11.3– 11.8	7.0– 7.3	Route 15 to Route 114 – Moncton Centre, Riverview, Shediac, Sackville	Exit 3 (Route 15)
1.000 mi = 1.609 km; 1.000 km = 0.621 mi
