= Ammon, New Brunswick =

Community in New Brunswick, Canada

Coordinates: 46°9′59.5″N 64°50′46.1″W

Location of Ammon in New Brunswick

Ammon is a Canadian community in Moncton Parish, New Brunswick. Ammon includes the Intersection at Ammon Rd and New Brunswick Route 490. Ammon is in part of Greater Moncton.

== See also ==
- List of communities in New Brunswick
- Greater Moncton
- List of entertainment events in Greater Moncton
