= Jeanneau Cape Breton =

Sailboat class

Development
- Location: France
- Year: 1970
- Builder: Jeanneau
- Role: Day sailer-cruiser
- Name: Jeanneau Cape Breton

Boat
- Displacement: 617 lb (280 kg)
- Draft: 3.28 ft (1.00 m) with centerboard down

Hull
- Type: monohull
- Construction: fiberglass
- LOA: 15.09 ft (4.60 m)
- LWL: 13.45 ft (4.10 m)
- Beam: 6.23 ft (1.90 m)
- Engine: Renault gasoline engine

Hull appendages
- Keel: long keel with centerboard
- Ballast: 298 lb (135 kg)
- Rudder: transom-mounted rudder

Rig
- Rig type: Bermuda rig

Sails
- Sailplan: fractional rigged sloop
- Total sail area: 107.00 sq ft (9.941 m^{2})

The Jeanneau Cape Breton, also called the Jeanneau Cap Breton, is a French trailerable sailboat that was designed as a day sailer-cruiser. It was first built in 1970.

== Production ==
The design was built by Jeanneau in France, starting in 1970, but it is now out of production.

== Design ==
The Cape Breton is a recreational keelboat, built predominantly of fiberglass, with wood trim. It has a fractional sloop rig. The hull has a raked stem, a slightly angled transom, a transom-hung rudder controlled by a tiller and a fixed long keel, with a retractable centerboard. It displaces 616 lb (279 kg) and carries 298 lb (135 kg) of ballast.

The boat has a draft of 3.28 ft (1.00 m) with the centerboard extended and 0.98 ft (0.30 m) with it retracted, allowing operation in shallow water, beaching or ground transportation on a trailer.

The boat is fitted with a French Renault gasoline engine for docking and maneuvering. It has a hull speed of 4.91 kn (9.09 km/h)..

== See also ==
- List of sailing boat types
