= Saint-Paul, New Brunswick =

Coordinates: 46°20′39″N 64°59′58″W

Saint-Paul is a community in Saint-Paul Parish, Kent County, New Brunswick, Canada northwest of Moncton. Its name is sometimes lengthened to match that of the Roman Catholic ecclesiastical parish of Saint-Paul-de-Kent, which can cause confusion with the civil parish of Saint-Paul and (by extension) with the local service district of the parish of Saint-Paul.

== History ==
First settled in 1863 and officially founded in 1883 with a population of over 1000. In 2008, the community celebrated its 125th anniversary. Many activities were planned for the whole year, starting with the winter carnival in January. Major activities were held during the summer, to finally conclude at the annual parish supper in September.

== See also ==
- List of communities in New Brunswick

== Bordering communities ==
- Hebert, New Brunswick
- McLean Settlement, New Brunswick
- Sweeneyville, New Brunswick
- Village-des-Belliveau, New Brunswicks
