= Canaan River =

Coordinates: 45.9128°N 65.7979°W

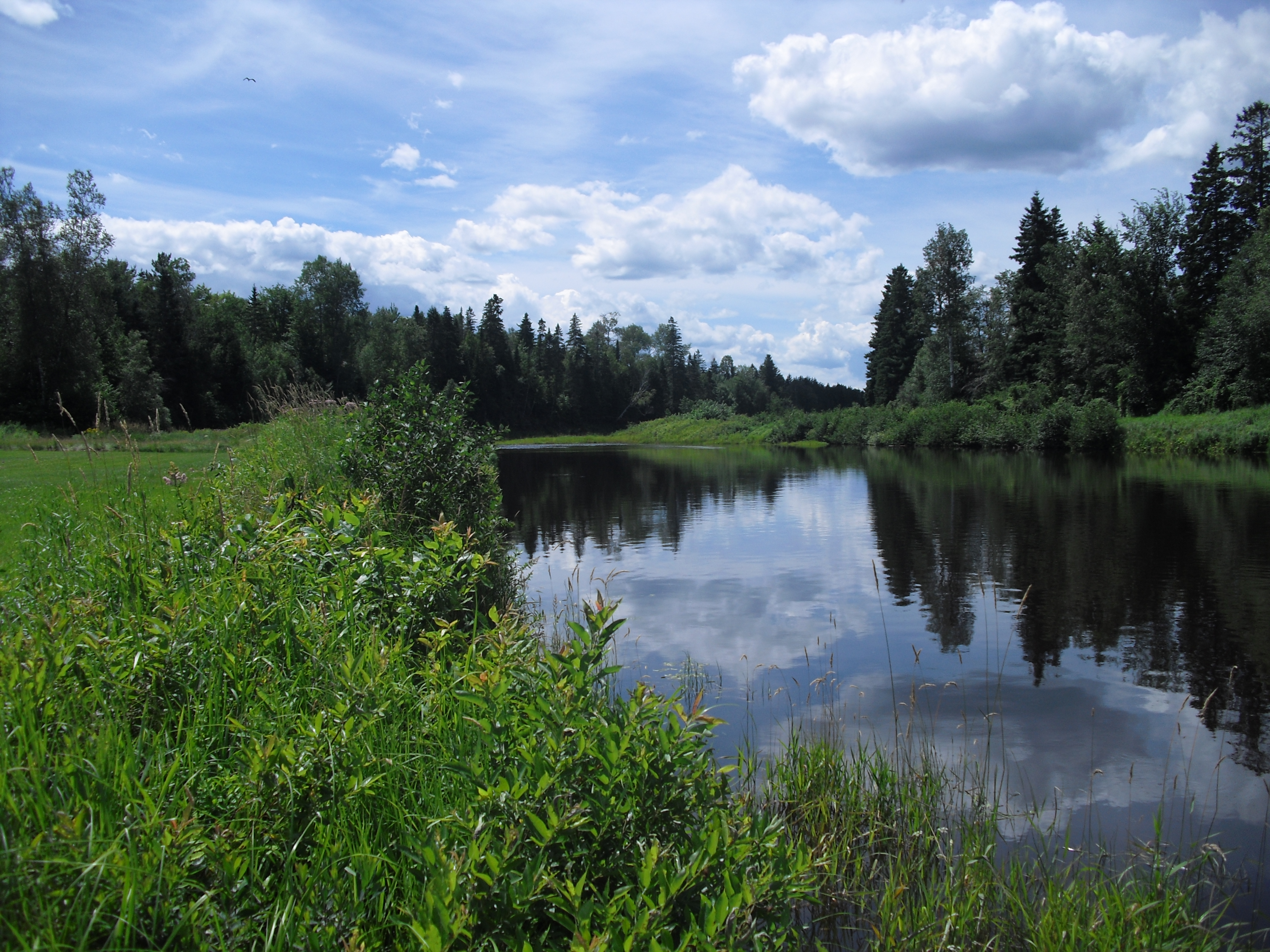

Location
- Country: Canada
- Province: New Brunswick
- Region: Southern New Brunswick

Physical characteristics
- Source: Saint John River
- Mouth: Saint John River on Bay of Fundy

Basin features
- River system: Bay of Fundy drainage basin
- Tributaries
  - left: Grand Lake

The Canaan River is a river in southeastern New Brunswick, Canada. The river is a tributary of the Saint John River, and is itself fed by 17 tributaries. Its watershed has an area of 2,167 km^{2} (837 mi^{2}).

== Communities along the river ==
- Canaan Station, New Brunswick
- New Canaan, New Brunswick
- Cherryvale, New Brunswick
- Canaan Forks, New Brunswick
- Phillipstown, New Brunswick
- Brookvale, New Brunswick
- Canaan Rapids, New Brunswick
- Coles Island, New Brunswick
- Chambres Corner, New Brunswick
- Thometown, New Brunswick

== River crossings ==
- New Brunswick Route 112
- New Brunswick Route 126
- New Brunswick Route 2
- New Brunswick Route 10
- New Brunswick Route 715
- New Brunswick Route 710

== See also ==
- List of rivers of New Brunswick
