= Meadow Brook, New Brunswick =

Coordinates: 46.1007403°N 64.5981289°W

Meadow Brook is an unincorporated community in Westmorland County, New Brunswick. The community is situated in Southeastern New Brunswick, to the east of Moncton. Meadow Brook is part of Greater Moncton.

== See also ==
- List of communities in New Brunswick
