= Soegao 35 =

First Nation reserve in New Brunswick, Canada

Coordinates: 46.0897222°N 64.9430555°W

Location of Soegao 35 in New Brunswick

Soegao 35 is a Mi'kmaq reserve in the Canadian province of New Brunswick, located in Westmorland County.

It is administratively part of the Elsipogtog First Nation.

== See also ==
- List of communities in New Brunswick
