= Hébert, New Brunswick =

Coordinates: 46.276°N 65.081°W

Hebert is a Canadian community, located in Kent County, New Brunswick. The community is situated in southeastern New Brunswick, to the northwest of Moncton. Hebert is located mainly at the intersection of New Brunswick Route 126 and New Brunswick Route 515. The end of the Bouctouche River ends north of this community.

== See also ==
- List of communities in New Brunswick

== Bordering communities ==
- Canaan Station, New Brunswick
- Birch Ridge, New Brunswick
- Saint Paul de Kent, New Brunswick
- Terrains de L'Évêque, New Brunswick
