= Bass Pro Complex =

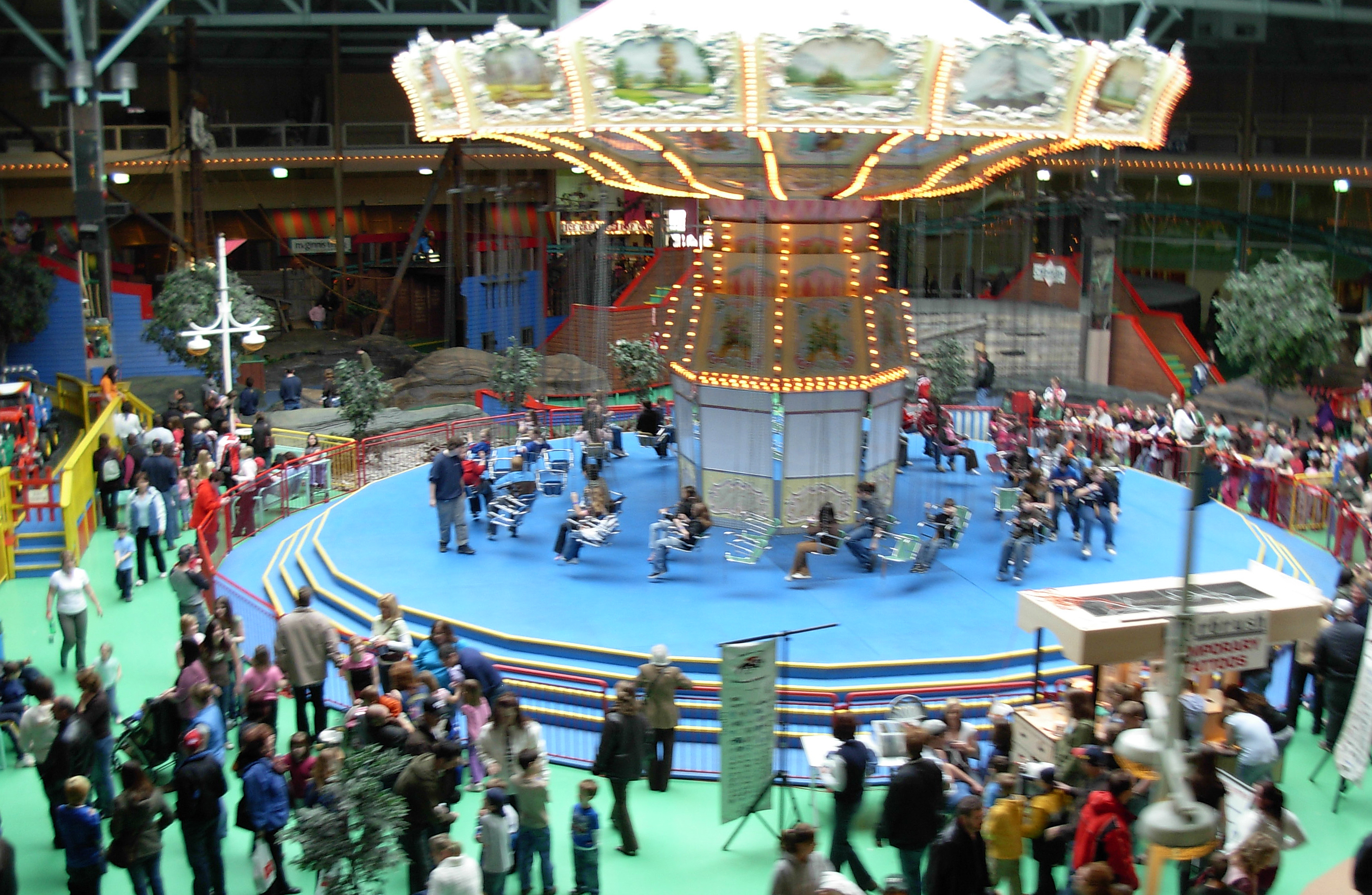
- The Wave Swinger in the Amusement Park when it was in the Crystal Palace Complex
- Location: Dieppe, New Brunswick, Canada
- Coordinates: 46.098814°N 64.763095°W
- Address: 1 Bass Pro Drive Dieppe
- Opened: February 15, 1990
- Previous names: Crystal Palace
- Owner: Westcliff
- Num. of stores: 5
- Num. of anchor tenants: 1
- Floor area: 160,000 sq ft (14,864.5 m^{2})
- Floors: 2
- Website: https://www.stores.basspro.ca/

Bass Pro Complex, formerly Crystal Palace Complex, is a shopping complex adjacent to the Champlain Place shopping mall in the city of Dieppe, New Brunswick, Canada, near Moncton.

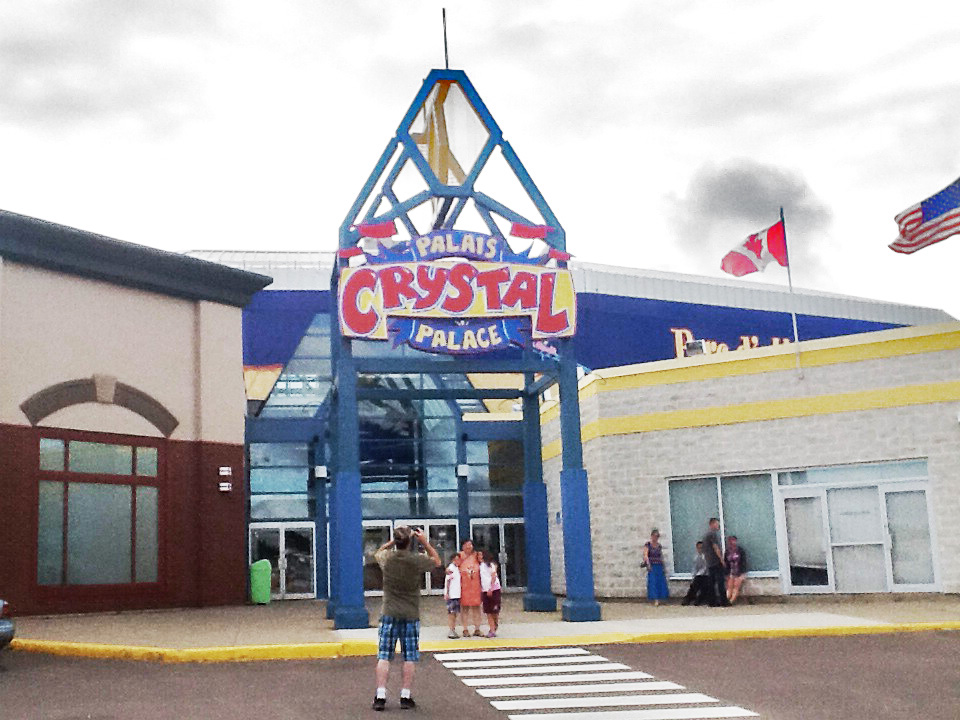
Crystal Palace in 2014

== History ==
On July 31, 2014, Cadillac Fairview announced that Crystal Palace Amusement Park would permanently close on September 1, 2014 to make way for New Brunswick's first Bass Pro Shops store.
