= New Brunswick Route 485 =

Highway in New Brunswick, Canada

Coordinates: 46.317888°N 64.990482°W

Route 485

Route information
- Maintained by New Brunswick Department of Transportation

Major junctions
- West end: Route 126 in Canaan
- East end: Route 490 between Gladside and McLean Settlement

Location
- Country: Canada
- Province: New Brunswick

Highway system
- Provincial highways in New Brunswick; Former routes
← Route 480	→ Route 490

Route 485 is a 23-kilometre (14 mi) long west–east secondary highway in the southeast portion of New Brunswick, Canada.

The route's western terminus is at Route 126 in the community of Canaan. The road travels northeast to the communities of Terrains de L'Évêque, Legereville and Sweeneyville before turning almost due east and intersecting with Route 490 between Gladside and McLean Settlement.
