= Canaan, New Brunswick =

Community in New Brunswick, Canada

Coordinates: 46.250°N 65.061°W

Canaan is a Canadian community, located in Westmorland County, New Brunswick. The community is situated in southeastern New Brunswick, to the northwest of Moncton. Canaan is located mainly at the intersection of New Brunswick Route 126 and New Brunswick Route 485. which is also situated around the Canaan River. Canaan is sometimes referred to as Canaan Station but Canaan is the official name.

== See also ==
- List of communities in New Brunswick

== Bordering communities ==
- Hebert, New Brunswick
- Saint-Paul, New Brunswick
- Gallagher Ridge, New Brunswick
- New Scotland, New Brunswick
- Terrains de L'Évêque, New Brunswick
