= Stilesville, New Brunswick =

Community in New Brunswick, Canada

Coordinates: 46.168508°N 64.883323°W

Location of Stilesville in New Brunswick

Stilesville is a Canadian community, located in Westmorland County, in southeastern New Brunswick. The community is in northwest of Moncton. Stilesville is part of Greater Moncton.

== See also ==
- List of communities in New Brunswick
- Greater Moncton
- List of entertainment events in Greater Moncton
