= Boundary Creek, New Brunswick =

Boundary Creek
- Unincorporated community
- Location within New Brunswick.
- Coordinates: 46°03′0″N 65°0′14″W
- Country: Canada
- Province: New Brunswick
- County: Westmorland
- Parish: Moncton
- Electoral Districts Federal: Fundy Royal
- Provincial: Petitcodiac
- Time zone: UTC-4 (AST)
  - Summer (DST): UTC-3 (ADT)
- Postal code(s): E5C
- Area code: 506
- Highways: Route 106

Boundary Creek is a Canadian unincorporated community in Westmorland County, New Brunswick.

== See also ==
- List of communities in New Brunswick
