= Berry Mills, New Brunswick =

Community in Maple Hills, New Brunswick, Canada

Coordinates: 46.117°N 64.950°W

Berry Mills is a small community in Maple Hills, New Brunswick. It is located northwest of Moncton in a valley between Lutes Mountain and Steeves Mountain, and around the main Canadian National Railway line, which was formerly the Intercolonial Railway of Canada line. Major Intersections include New Brunswick Route 128 and New Brunswick Route 2 as well as Homestead Road and New Brunswick Route 128. Berry Mills also includes the mostly forest area of Lutesville, New Brunswick.

== History ==
The community was founded by, and named after, Jonathan Berry who settled there in 1812 and established a water powered sawmill on land which he was granted. Originally named Jonathan Creek, the community was renamed to Berry Mills for Tingley Berry - Jonathan Berry's son.

In 1898 the community had a population of 200.

Berry Mills once hosted two separate rail lines through the community:

- The Intercolonial Railway of Canada built their line connecting Moncton with Rivière-du-Loup, Québec in 1875 via New Brunswick's east coast.
- The National Transcontinental Railway connected Moncton with Quebec City and Winnipeg, Manitoba, via central New Brunswick, Northern Québec, and Northern Ontario. Construction began in 1903 and the line was operational in 1913.

When the Canadian Government nationalized these two railways to form Canadian National Railway, the two lines were connected via junctions to the east in Moncton, and west at Pacific Junction. The rails were subsequently lifted and the two lines rationalized in this area, using the alignment of the former National Transcontinental Railway. The former Intercolonial Railway route became known as Berry Mills Road, which is now New Brunswick Route 128.

In the 1950s the Trans Canada Highway route 2 was routed through Berry Mills, and a grade separation was constructed for the railway line. In the late 1970s this was further upgraded when partial cloverleaf interchange was constructed.

In the late 1990s the Trans Canada Highway route 2 was relocated approximately 1 kilometre to the east as part of a major highway upgrade and twinning project. The former section of highway 2 in this area was subsequently renamed Homestead Road, and the section of highway 2 to the northeast was absorbed into New Brunswick Route 128.

== Places of note ==
Name	Category	Owner/Est Pop	Notes
Westmorland-Albert Solid Waste Commission	Commercial		Solid waste sorting company used by the Albert, Kings, and Westmorland Counties municipalities.

== See also ==
- List of communities in New Brunswick
