= Gallagher Ridge, New Brunswick =

Community in New Brunswick, Canada

Coordinates: 46.201°N 65.020°W

Gallagher Ridge is a Canadian community, located in Westmorland County, New Brunswick. The community is situated in southeastern New Brunswick, to the northwest of Moncton. Gallagher Ridge is part of Greater Moncton. Gallagher Ridge is located on New Brunswick Route 126.

== See also ==
- List of communities in New Brunswick

== Bordering communities ==
- Indian Mountain, New Brunswick
- Canaan Station, New Brunswick
- New Scotland, New Brunswick
- Moncton, New Brunswick
