= Irishtown, New Brunswick =

Community in New Brunswick, Canada

Coordinates: 46.1880°N 64.7922°W

Location of Irishtown in New Brunswick

Irishtown is a community located in Moncton Parish, Westmorland County, New Brunswick, Canada. The community is situated in southeastern New Brunswick, to the north of Moncton on Route 115.

The special service area of Irishtown within the former local service district of the parish of Moncton took its name from the community.

== History ==
Irishtown was founded in 1820 by Irish families who settled in the area.

== Places of note ==
- Irishtown Community Centre
- Maplewood Golf & Country Club
- Mountain View School
- St. Lawrence O'Toole Catholic Church
- Irish First Settlers Monument

Irishtown nature park Christmas lights house Irishtown grocery

== See also ==
- List of communities in New Brunswick
