= Champlain Place =

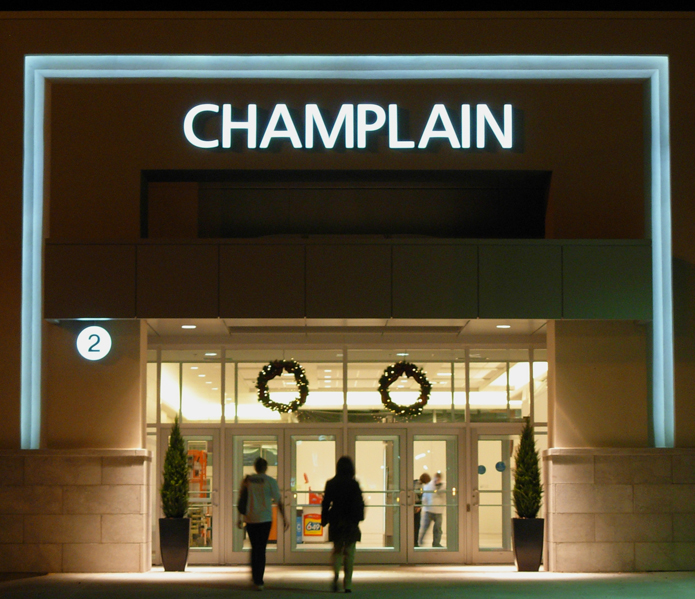
- Location: 477 Paul Street Dieppe, New Brunswick, Canada
- Coordinates: 46.095700°N 64.762500°W
- Address: 477 Paul Street
- Opened: 1974
- Owner: Westcliff
- Num. of stores: 128
- Num. of anchor tenants: 8
- Floor area: 820,908 sq ft (76,264.8 m^{2})
- Floors: 1
- Website: champlainplace.com

Champlain Place (French: Place Champlain), also known as Champlain Mall and styled as Place Champlain Place on their social media pages, is a shopping centre located in Dieppe, New Brunswick, Canada. It is the largest single-building shopping centre in Atlantic Canada by floor space.

== Stores ==
The mall has over 150 stores and services. The anchor tenants are:

- Walmart (129,621 sq ft or 12,042.2 m^{2})
- Sobeys (51,456 sq ft or 4,780.4 m^{2})
- Clément (31,140 sq ft or 2,893.0 m^{2})
- Sport Chek (20,000 sq ft or 1,858.1 m^{2})
- H&M (17,981 sq ft or 1,670.5 m^{2})
- Urban Planet (17,101 sq ft or 1,588.7 m^{2})
- Linen Chest (12,830 sq ft or 1,191.9 m^{2})

== Notable former retailers ==
- Sears, now a TD Canada Trust corporate office.
- Woolco, now a Walmart.
- Dominion, rebuilt as a Toys "R" Us.
- Consumers Distributing, became a Sobeys due to bankruptcy.
- Future Shop, relocated to a free standing store in late 2006 which became a Best Buy in early 2015.
- Toys "R" Us, became a Clément in late 2025.

== History ==
=== Major expansions ===
The site began as a Sears store; however, in 1974, it was expanded to include Champlain Place Shopping Centre, including where Walmart is now (then Woolco) and to the west (then Dominion and Consumers Distributing).

=== Other ===
- Until September 2008, customers of Champlain Place were allowed to bring their shopping carts with them anywhere within the common areas of the mall. Carts have since been banned from use in the common areas, and restricted to grocery and large department stores.
- Champlain Place is named after Samuel de Champlain, a French explorer of the region.
- On October 31st 2024, it was announced that Westcliff had purchased Champlain Place from Cadillac Fairview for an undisclosed price

== See also ==
- List of largest enclosed shopping malls in Canada
- List of shopping malls in Canada
- Bass Pro Complex (Dieppe)
