= Lakeville, Westmorland County, New Brunswick =

Human settlement in New Brunswick, Canada

Coordinates: 46.150465°N 64.67617°W

Lakeville is a Canadian community, located in Westmorland County, New Brunswick. Since 2023, Lakeville has been incorporated into the rural community of Maple Hills. The community is situated in southeastern New Brunswick, to the east of Moncton, at the intersection of New Brunswick Route 2 and New Brunswick Route 134. Lakeville is located mainly on Route 134.

== Places of note ==
- Lakeville United Church (former Methodist Church) built in 1879
- Lakeside Golf & Country Club.
- Lakeside Estates (Mini Home Park)
- Auberge Wild Rose Inn http://wildroseinn.com

== See also ==
- List of communities in New Brunswick
