= Indian Mountain, New Brunswick =

Community in New Brunswick, Canada

Coordinates: 46.1613°N 64.932075°W

Location of Indian Mountain in New Brunswick

Indian Mountain is a Canadian community, located in Westmorland County, New Brunswick. It is situated in southeastern New Brunswick, to the northwest of Moncton. Indian Mountain is part of Greater Moncton. Indian Mountain is located on New Brunswick Route 126

== Places of note ==
- Magnetic Hill School
- Lutes Mountain Meeting House
- Lutes Mountain Church of the Nazarene

== See also ==
- Greater Moncton
- List of entertainment events in Greater Moncton
- List of communities in New Brunswick
