= Cape Breton, New Brunswick =

Community located in New Brunswick, Canada

Coordinates: 46.2023°N 64.7385°W

Location of Cape Breton in New Brunswick

Cape Breton is a community located in Westmorland County, New Brunswick, Canada. The community is situated in southeastern New Brunswick, to the north-east of Moncton.

== See also ==
- List of communities in New Brunswick
