= Dieppe, New Brunswick =

Dieppe
- City
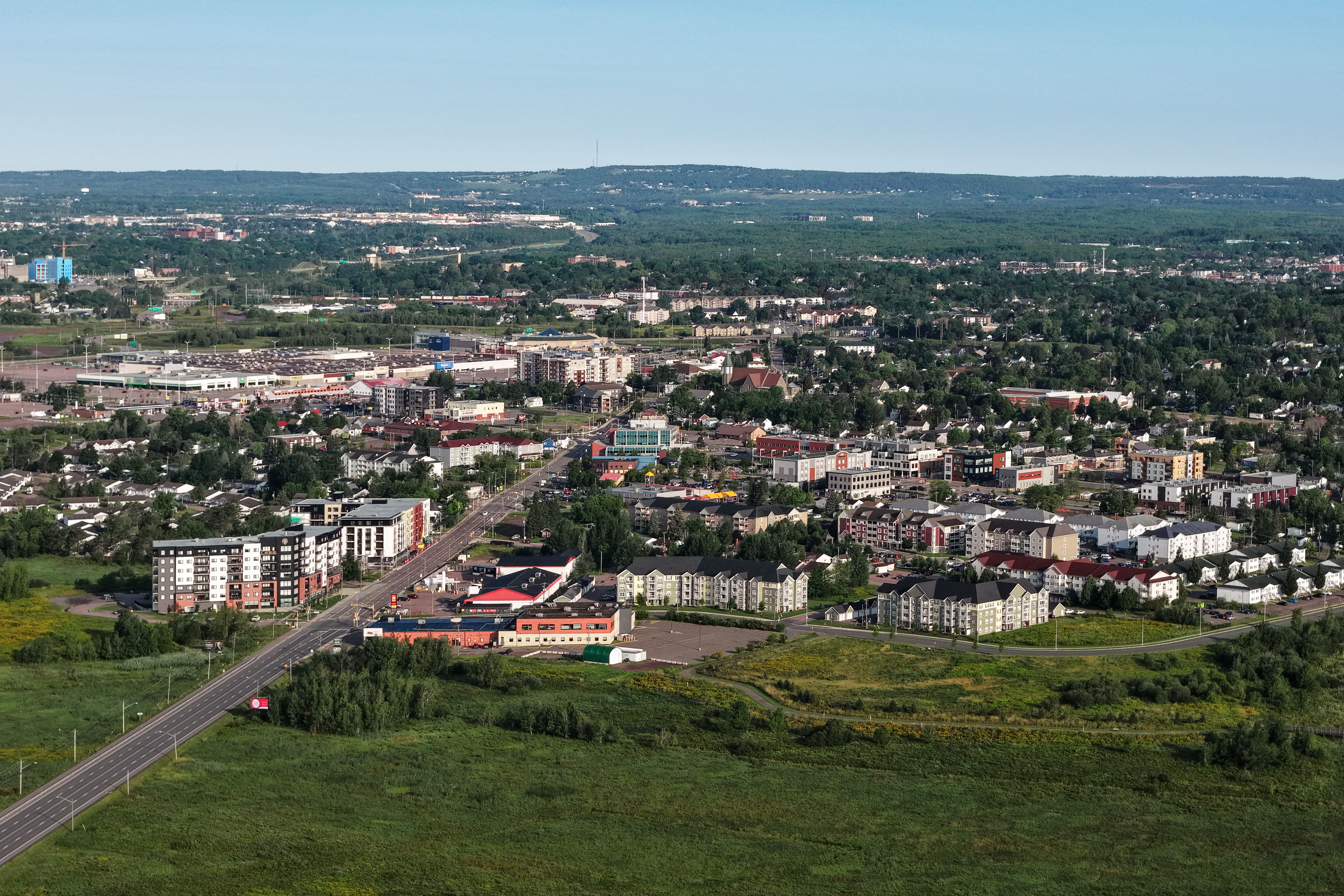
- Aerial view of downtown Dieppe in 2026

- Seal
- Motto: "Constantia et virtute" (Latin) "By constancy and virtue"
- Interactive map of Dieppe
- Location of Dieppe in New Brunswick
- Coordinates: 46.098889°N 64.724167°W
- Country: Canada
- Province: New Brunswick
- County: Westmorland
- Parish: Moncton
- City: January 1, 2003
- Town: January 1, 1952
- Incorporated village: February 8, 1946
- Founded: 1730

Government
  - Type: Dieppe City Council
  - Mayor: Hélène Boudreau
  - MPs: Ginette Petitpas Taylor
  - MLAs: Robert Gauvin / Natacha Vautour

Area
  - City: 77.02 km^{2} (29.74 sq mi)
  - Urban: 98.388 km^{2} (37.988 sq mi)
  - Metro: 117.309 km^{2} (45.293 sq mi)
- Highest elevation: 45 m (148 ft)
- Lowest elevation: 5 m (16 ft)

Population (2021)
  - City: 28,114
  - Density: 365/km^{2} (950/sq mi)
  - Urban: 107,068
  - Metro: 146,073 (Q32,016)
- Time zone: UTC-4 (AST)
  - Summer (DST): UTC-3 (ADT)
- Postal code(s): E1A
- Area code: 506
- NTS Map: 21I2 Moncton
- GNBC Code: DADHJ
- Highways: Route 2 (TCH); Route 11; Route 15; Route 106; Route 132; Route 925
- Website: dieppe.ca

Dieppe (/diˈɛp/) is a city in the Canadian maritime province of New Brunswick. Statistics Canada counted the population at 28,114 in 2021, making it the fourth-largest city in the province. On 1 January 2023, Dieppe annexed parts of two neighbouring local service districts; revised census figures have not been released.

Dieppe's history and identity goes back to the eighteenth century. Formerly known as Leger's Corner, it was incorporated as a town in 1952 under the Dieppe name, and designated as a city in 2003. The Dieppe name was adopted by the citizens of the area in 1946 to commemorate the Second World War's Operation Jubilee, the Dieppe Raid of 1942. It is predominantly a francophone city; with 63.8% of the population's mother tongue being French, 24% English, 3% French and English, and 8% other. A majority of the population reports being bilingual, speaking both French and English. Residents generally speak French with a regional accent (colloquially called "Chiac") which is unique to southeastern New Brunswick. A large majority of Dieppe's population were in favour of the by-law regulating the use of external commercial signs in both official languages, which is a first for the province of New Brunswick. Dieppe is the largest predominantly francophone city in Canada outside Québec; while there are other municipalities with greater total numbers of francophones, they constitute a minority of the population in those cities. Dieppe was one of the co-hosts of the first Congrès Mondial Acadien (Acadian World Congress) which was held in the Moncton region in 1994, and again in 2019.

Dieppe is part of the census metropolitan area of Moncton, which is New Brunswick's most populous city, with a metropolitan population of 144,810 according to Statistics Canada in 2016.

== Name ==
In 1910, the area known as French Village became known as Leger's Corner which, in turn, became the Village of Dieppe in 1946 to commemorate the Canadian soldiers killed during the landing of Allied troops on Normandy beaches in Dieppe, France, on August 19, 1942. On January 1, 1952, the Village of Dieppe became the Town of Dieppe. On January 1, 2003, the municipality was designated as the City of Dieppe.

== Government ==
Dieppe federal election results
Year	Liberal		Conservative		New Democratic		Green	
2021	64%	8,280	14%	1,835	13%	1,700	3%	436
2019	56%	8,603	15%	2,297	9%	1,432	17%	2,621

Dieppe provincial election results
Year	PC		Liberal		Green		People's Allnc.	
2020	24%	3,208	62%	8,164	9%	1,142	1%	151
2018	14%	1,680	71%	8,749	3%	421	–	–

=== Provincial electoral districts ===
Members of the 58th New Brunswick Legislative Assembly (2014), the governing house of the province of New Brunswick.

- Dieppe - Vacant
- Shediac Bay-Dieppe - Robert Gauvin

=== Federal electoral districts ===
Members of the 42nd Parliament of Canada (2015). A section of southeast Dieppe is in the Beauséjour riding.

- Moncton—Riverview—Dieppe - Ginette Petitpas Taylor
- Beauséjour - Dominic LeBlanc

== Geography ==
Dieppe is located on the Petitcodiac River. It forms the southeastern part of the Greater Moncton Area, which, in addition to the city of Moncton, includes the town of Riverview, Moncton Parish, Memramcook, Coverdale, and Salisbury.

=== Climate ===
Dieppe

Climate chart (precipitation, max. and min. temperature)
J	F	M	A	M	J	J	A	S	O	N	D
102 −10 −13	136 −9 −12	107 −1 −7	109 10 −2	80 19 4	159 22 9	106 23 14	88 23 13	165 19 10	121 12 3	141 4 −1	245 −2 −8
- █ Average max. and min. temperatures in °C
- █ Precipitation totals in mm
Imperial conversion
J	F	M	A	M	J	J	A	S	O	N	D
4 14 9	5.4 16 10	4.2 30 19	4.3 50 28	3.1 66 39	6.3 72 48	4.2 73 57	3.5 73 55	6.5 66 50	4.8 54 37	5.6 39 30	9.6 28 18
- █ Average max. and min. temperatures in °F
- █ Precipitation totals in inches

== Demographics ==
In the 2021 Census of Population conducted by Statistics Canada, Dieppe had a population of 28,114 living in 11,570 of its 11,993 total private dwellings, a change of 10.8% from its 2016 population of 25,384. With a land area of 77.02 km^{2} (29.74 sq mi), it had a population density of 365.0/km^{2} (945.4/sq mi) in 2021.

Historical population
Year	Pop.	±%
1931	2,582	—
1941	2,905	+12.5%
1951	3,402	+17.1%
1961	4,032	+18.5%
1971	4,277	+6.1%
1981	8,511	+99.0%
1986	9,084	+6.7%
1991	10,650	+17.2%
1996	12,497	+17.3%
2001	14,951	+19.6%
2006	18,565	+24.2%
2011	23,310	+25.6%
2016	25,384	+8.9%
2021	28,114	+10.8%

=== Language ===
Canada Census Mother Tongue - Dieppe, New Brunswick
Census	Total	English			French			English & French			Other		
Year	Responses	Count	Trend	Pop %	Count	Trend	Pop %	Count	Trend	Pop %	Count	Trend	Pop %
2021	27,880	6,880	▲17.21%	24.68%	17,810	▼0.48%	63.88%	950	▲73.31%	3.41%	2,250	▲152.81%	8.07%
2016	25,025	5,870	▲10.02%	23.46%	17,725	▲7.00%	70.83%	545	▲25.29%	2.18%	890	▲61.82%	3.56%
2011	22,885	5,335	—N/a	23.31%	16,565	—N/a	72.38%	435	—N/a	1.9%	550	—N/a	2.4%

92% is fluent in English; 84% is fluent in French; 75% is bilingual.

=== Ethnicity ===
Panethnic groups in the City of Dieppe (2001−2021)
Panethnic group	2021		2016		2011		2006		2001	
Panethnic group	Pop.	%	Pop.	%	Pop.	%	Pop.	%	Pop.	%
European (Note: Statistic includes all persons that did not make up part of a visible minority or an indigenous identity.)	23,995	86.73%	23,235	93.41%	21,890	95.86%	17,935	97.9%	14,570	98.81%
African	755	2.73%	295	1.19%	180	0.79%	150	0.82%	50	0.34%
Indigenous	735	2.66%	620	2.49%	340	1.49%	85	0.46%	120	0.81%
Middle Eastern (Note: Statistic includes total responses of "West Asian" and "Arab" under visible minority section on census.)	585	2.11%	95	0.38%	175	0.77%	45	0.25%	10	0.07%
Southeast Asian (Note: Statistic includes total responses of "Filipino" and "Southeast Asian" under visible minority section on census.)	535	1.93%	185	0.74%	40	0.18%	20	0.11%	0	0%
South Asian	405	1.46%	75	0.3%	0	0%	40	0.22%	0	0%
East Asian (Note: Statistic includes total responses of "Chinese", "Korean", and "Japanese" under visible minority section on census.)	310	1.12%	290	1.17%	140	0.61%	20	0.11%	0	0%
Latin American	175	0.63%	55	0.22%	25	0.11%	25	0.14%	0	0%
Other/multiracial (Note: Statistic includes total responses of "Visible minority, n.i.e." and "Multiple visible minorities" under visible minority section on census.)	175	0.63%	25	0.1%	0	0%	10	0.05%	0	0%
Total responses	27,665	98.4%	24,875	97.99%	22,835	97.96%	18,320	98.68%	14,745	98.62%
Total population	28,114	100%	25,384	100%	23,310	100%	18,565	100%	14,951	100%
Note: Totals greater than 100% due to multiple origin responses

== History ==
Acadians from the Petitcoudiac and Shepody (French: Chipoudy) regions were the first pioneers to settle in the area and founded Sylvabreau in 1730, followed by the Melanson family at Ruisseau-des-Renards (Fox Creek) in 1746 and the LeBlanc and Boudreau families at Chartersville in 1776. Prior to the arrival of Acadian settlers, the southern part of the province was inhabited by the Algonquin people.

=== Sylvabreau/Battle of the Petitcodiac ===
The Battle of the Petitcodiac was fought on September 2, 1755, during the British expulsion of the Acadians, after the capture of Fort Beauséjour. The Massachusetts-British force was soundly defeated by troops from Boishébert, Acadian militia, and First Nations' warriors. At the mouth of the Nacadie Creek (Hall's) settlements such as le Coude (The Bend), Sylvabreau and the surrounding hamlets were destroyed. Even after these raids, Acadians returned to these villages and the numbers grew as the deportation from peninsular Nova Scotia continued, followed by the deportation from present-day Prince Edward Island and Cape Breton. Victory for the British occurred three years later (1758) during the Petitcodiac River Campaign (fr:La bataille du Cran) which resulted in the deportation of the Acadians that lived along the Petitcodiac River or had taken refuge there from earlier deportation operations.

=== From municipality to town to city ===
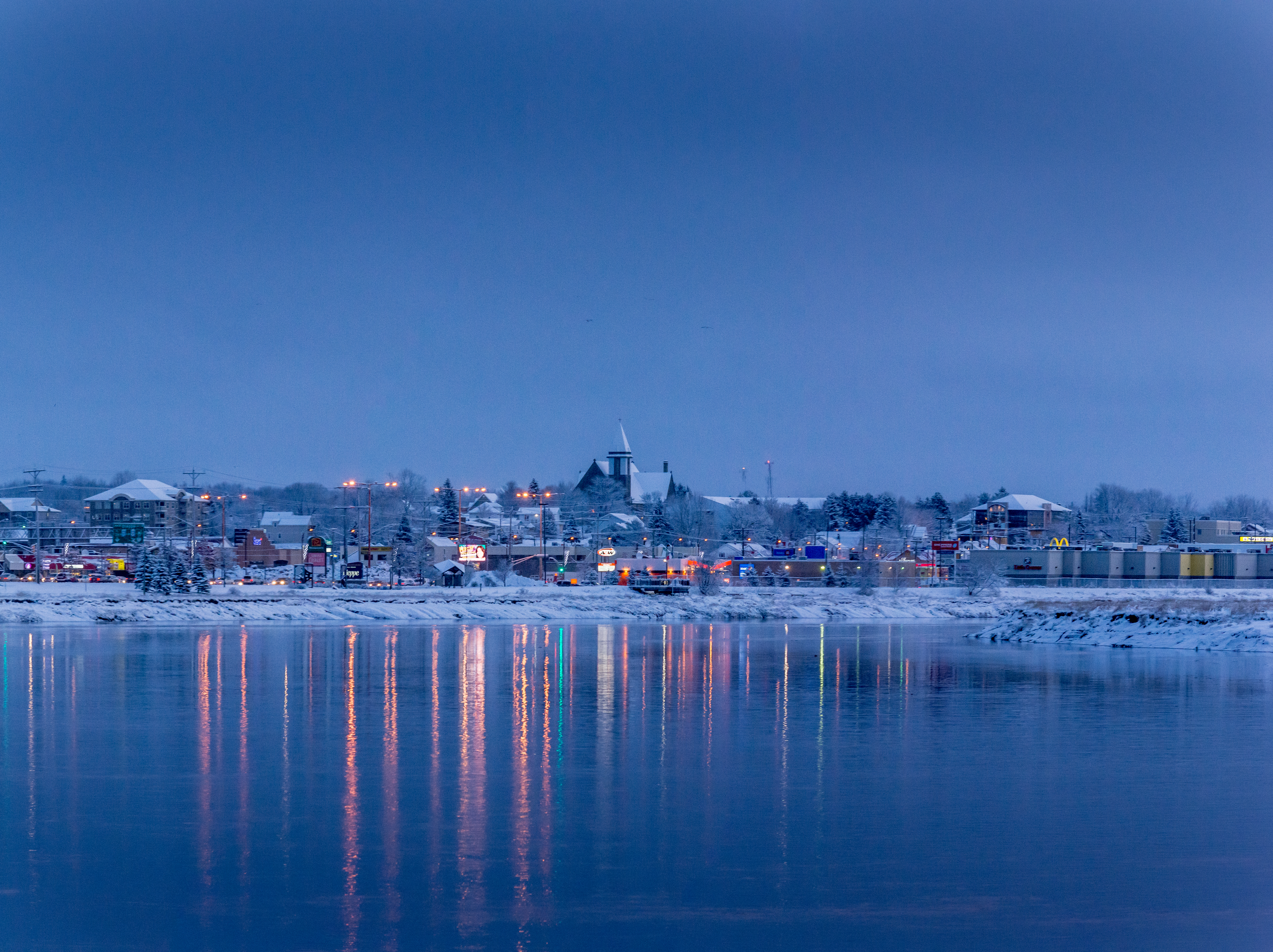
Waterfront during winter

Dieppe was known as Upper Village after the Expulsion and was settled by the Surette, Maillet, and Thibodeau families, while Chartersville was called Leblanc's Village and also included members of the Boudreau's clan. Prior to 1800, Pierre Bourgeois had established himself on the (Ruisseau des Renards) Fox Creek salt marsh. Agriculture, forestry and some fishing sustained these Acadian families up until the mid-1800s, when shipbuilding and railways created employment opportunities for Acadians around the Moncton area. After a bridge was completed in 1867 at the mouth of Hall's Creek (Nacadie during the French settlement at Le Coude), a road was constructed that link the incorporated Town of Moncton's Westmorland Road (Main Street) to the (French Village) Dieppe area. This road went through farmland that had belong to the Leger family and intersected the old road (Acadie Avenue) that had taken travellers up and around Hall's Creek to the community of Lewisville to get to Moncton. By 1900, the little area around the intersection became known as Léger's Corner, and with the increasing traffic from the bridge, merchants became attracted to the corner and soon set up shops and services around the intersection. Prior to the First World War, a small residential development was erected, and the community continue to grow until the Second World War. Then a population explosion occurred. Léger's Corner received the largest influx of military personnel in southeastern New Brunswick. Ten thousand airmen (due to the airport) and their support staff arrived overnight in 1940, and soon temporary warehouses and housing were erected. When Léger's Corner became incorporated as a municipal village in 1946, the community was renamed Dieppe, after a port in France on the English Channel, to honour the 913 Canadian servicemen who took part (and as a result died)in the Dieppe Raid, the bloody landing by Allied soldiers, on August 19, 1942, during the Second World War. Then, part of Lakeburn was annexed in 1946 and Dieppe-East in 1948. A referendum (262 for, 232 against) marginally favoured the village to incorporate as the Town of Dieppe in 1952. At that time, Dieppe had over 3,000 inhabitants within its boundaries. Growth continued unabated throughout the 1950s and 1960s as Dieppe annexed the villages of Saint-Anselme and Chartersville and the local service districts of Dover-Fox Creek (Upper Dover), the parish of Dorchester (part), and the parish of Moncton (part), the latter in 1973. With its rural expansion came a growth in population exceeding 8,500 in the 1981 census. During the 1980s and early 1990s, the Town of Dieppe, like the rest of the region, went through an economic downfall which limited its growth in population. By 2001, the Greater Moncton area and Dieppe's economy flourished and with it came a population increment of nearly 15,000 in 2001 to over 23,000 in 2011. To preserve its heritage, culture and identity as a community in Southern New Brunswick, Dieppe opted to incorporate itself as a city on January 1, 2003. At that time it became New Brunswick's eighth incorporated city.

Maps of Dieppe from the 1960s show Champlain Street below Acadie Avenue as Main Street and above the intersection as Airport Road.

== Neighbourhoods ==
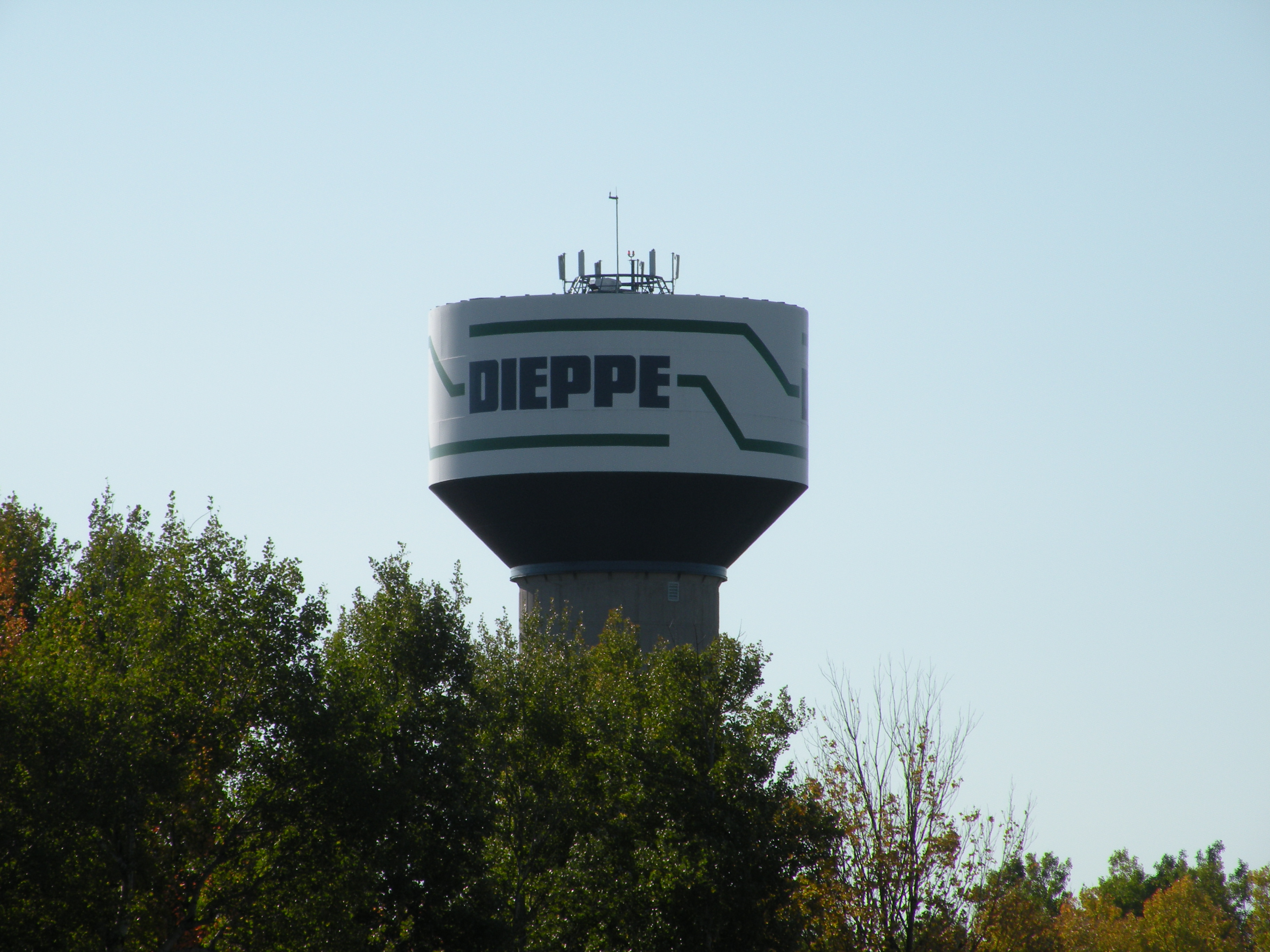
Water tower

Dieppe's geographic area is a direct union of Acadian parishes and villages such as:

- Léger's Corner (French Village) - The downtown area has both retail and entertainment venues. Located near the City Hall are businesses, professionals, banking institutions, office buildings, restaurants, a public square, a cultural centre and a farmers market. The Dieppe Public Library, which is part of the New Brunswick Public Library System, has very modern facilities in the municipal building. The retail sector is predominantly located on Paul and Champlain Streets.
- Chartersville (Leblanc Village) (1776) Congregation Tiferes Israel Cemetery has been a landmark in Chartersville since 1930. A small Protestant cemetery located on an adjacent lot contains only a few tombstones, several of which bear the names of members of the Charters family, descendants of Chartersville founder John Charters. The Charters gave their name to the former village of Chartersville. Also, it is the home of the Our lady of Calvary Cemetery (Cimetere Notre Dame du Calvaire).
- Dieppe Boulevard sector - Located in the northeast area of Dieppe is a fast-growing commercial, business and residential area. This north-south connector stretches from Route 15 through the Dieppe Industrial Park, the Uptown area, the Fox Creek Golf community and several residential areas before ending at Melanson Road. It is less than a kilometre away from Greater Moncton International Airport.
- Fox Creek/Dover (1746) - Up until the early 1980s, a local merchant, Mother's Own Bakery (Fox Creek), which subsequently was purchased by the former Ben's Bakery, housed its production and retail store in this district. Dover Road school was the educational institution for the region prior to the modernization of the NB School Act. In the early 20th century, a religious sacramental - a Cross and 1755 Bicentennial Grotto - was erected at the intersection of Dover Road and Amirault Street.
- Lakeburn - a neighbourhood directly south of Greater Moncton International Airport with a population of 371, and almost entirely residential. It contains the Boys and Girls Club of Dieppe and a small Corner Store.
- Painsec North
- Saint-Anselme (1820) - former village and the site of the Roman Catholic Church (Saint-Anselm). The original wooden church that replaced the chapel was erected in the early 19th century. The current stone structure was built in the early 1900s.

== Education ==
=== Provincial public school systems ===
The following is a list of public schools in the city:

School name	Start	End	School district	Year open	Max. enrolment	2012 enrolment	Notes
École Amirault	K	5	Francophone Sud	1969		307	
École Sainte-Therèse	K	5	Francophone Sud	1954		603	New facilities and improvements were added in 2011.
École Anna-Malenfant	1	4	Francophone Sud	1992		665	
Lou MacNarin School	K	5	Anglophone East	1995		569	
École Mathieu-Martin	9	12	Francophone Sud	1972		940	
École Carrefour de l'Acadie	6	8	Francophone Sud	2006		572	
Écoles Le Marais and Antonine-Maillet	3	8	Francophone Sud	2017		1,000	completed in 2018 to accommodate the growing population

=== Higher educational institutions ===
==== CCNB - Dieppe ====
- Le Collège communautaire du Nouveau-Brunswick-Campus de Dieppe is a francophone post-secondary higher education institution. CCNB-Dieppe opened to the public in 1987. Its English-language counterpart, NBCC Moncton campus, situated on Mountain Road in Moncton, is the largest of the NBCC system. The province has two autonomous English and French community college corporations established under the 2010 New Brunswick Community Colleges Act.

== Parks and recreation ==
The community has some thirty-five parks and green spaces: one city park, fourteen green spaces and twenty neighbourhood parks, as well as green islands and a growing number of trails and bicycle paths.

=== Festivals ===
- Dieppe Kite International—Kite flyers from several countries come to Dover Park in Dieppe. The first Dieppe Kite International took place in 2001 with the objective to offer an event that was original and of international calibre.
- Dieppe Friendship Carnival—The annual friendship winter carnival started in the 1970s and features sleigh rides, skating on the pond, fiddle music, community breakfasts, canteen and more.

=== Sports facilities ===
- Dieppe Aquatic and Sports Centre—Located at 111 Aquatique Street, Dieppe Aquatic and Sports Centre is a recreational facility, with three pools; a 25-meter six-lane pool for laps and various activities; a two-lane recreational pool for swimming and aquafitness sessions; and a second recreational pool with a slope from 0 to 1.4 meters (0.0 to 4.6 ft) equipped with water games, waterslides, a sitting and water jet area and a pirate ship for children.
- Arthur-J-LeBlanc Centre—The Arthur-J-LeBlanc Centre is a 595-seat multi-purpose arena.

== Attractions ==
The city of Dieppe is a participant in the province of New Brunswick's local historic places program, funded by the government of Canada through the historic places initiative.

=== Monuments ===
- Honoré Melanson Village—Once known as the community district of Fox Creek, this site was established by Paul Honoré Melanson and his wife Marie-Josephe Breau in 1748. This couple resisted the 1755 Deportation and sought exile in Louisiana in 1764. The site commemorated with a plaque is located at the intersection of Marguerite, Amirault, and Fox Creek streets.
- Odyssée—This monument, located at "Le coude" on the Petitcodiac river, tells the story of Acadian resistance on the banks of the river, after deportation orders were issued. Joseph Broussard and his friends used Guerrilla warfare tactics to avoid deportation.
- Veterans Cenotaph—The Veterans’ Monument was erected by the Dieppe Military Veterans Association in 1981. It is located at 333 Acadie Avenue. The veterans wanted a memorial erected in honour of the soldiers who sacrificed their lives on the beaches of Dieppe, France, and elsewhere during all of the wars in which Canada and its allies took part. In 2000, a granite base was installed in honour of World War I, World War II and Korean War, as well as the contribution of peacekeepers. A base bearing the words "Nous nous souviendrons / Lest we forget" with a poppy on each side was added at the back of the monument.

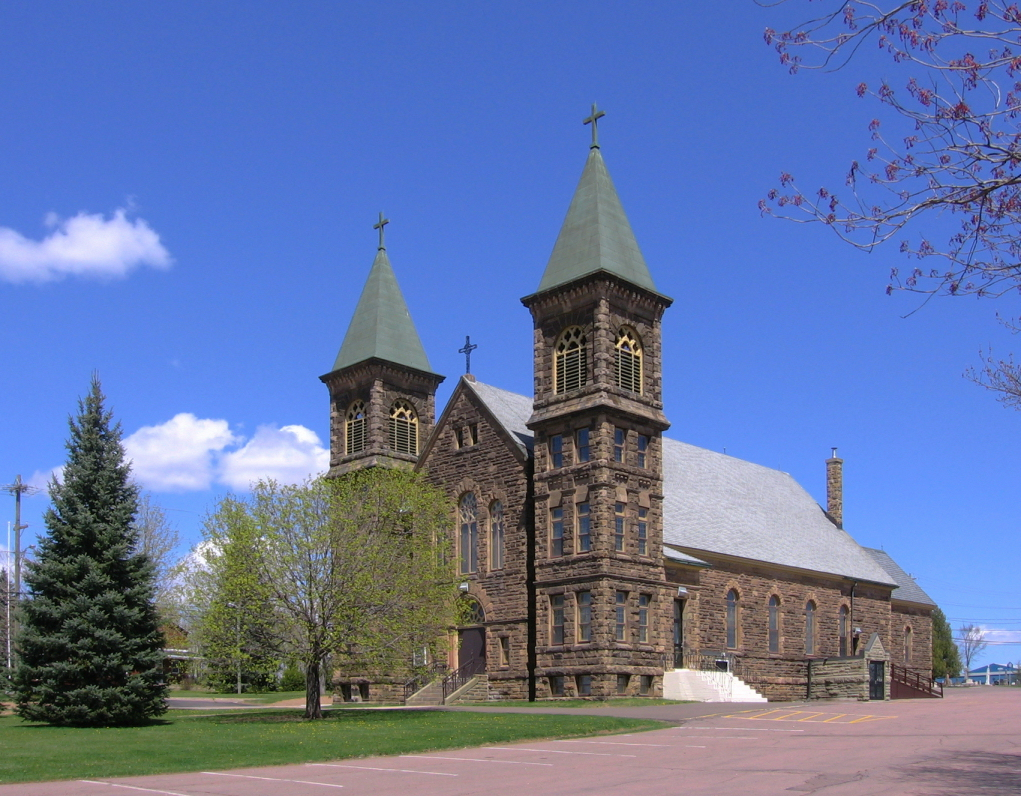
Saint Anselme Church. The current building was erected in 1900.

=== Prominent buildings ===
- Saint Anselme Church is a Romanesque Revival Catholic church located at 1014 Amirault Street in the Saint-Anselme sector of Dieppe. Built at the turn of the 20th century, this rectangular cut-stone structure has a gable roof and two square towers on the front façade. Saint-Anselme Church is designated a Local Historic Place for its religious role and for its architecture. It illustrates the Acadians’ respect for religious and spiritual matters. The church replaced one that had been built in 1839. Originally, a chapel built in 1812, located west of the current Chapelle Street, was used for worship until 1839. Construction work on Saint-Anselme Church began in 1898. The blessing of the church took place on October 11, 1904.
- Saint Teresa of the Infant Jesus Church is a large stone and concrete structure with a bell tower and Gothic windows. This modern interpretation of Gothic Revival religious architecture is located at the corner of Sainte-Thérèse Street and Acadie Avenue in Dieppe. The church highlights the importance of the Catholic Church in the community life of Leger Corner. In 1930, this parish broke away from the parish of Saint-Anselme and built its first church, made of wood. That building was converted into a community centre in 1950 when this new stone church was opened to the public. Sainte-Thérèse Church is recognized for its architecture. This place of worship was built by contractor Abbey Landry of Memramcook from 1949 to 1950. This building exhibits a modern interpretation of traditional Gothic Revival religious architecture. In its Gothic windows, magnificent stained-glass panels illustrate the life of patron Saint Theresa of the Child Jesus, a Carmelite nun who died at Lisieux, France in 1897, at the age of 24.
- Joseph-Doiron House is located at 1150 Amirault Street. Built in 1847, the Joseph-Doiron House was once the meeting and celebration place for the Village of St-Anselme. Its basement also served as a school. Joseph Doiron was a literate notary who had been educated in Memramcook by Father Louis Brodeur.

=== Shopping ===
- Champlain Place—The largest single-building shopping centre in Atlantic Canada by floor space (also the largest single-story mall east of Montreal) opened in 1974 and currently has over 150 stores and services with five anchor tenants. An expansion to the mall was added in 1986 with the anchor store Sobeys. In addition, a major interior and exterior renovation of the mall was completed in November 2008. The original anchor store Sears was established in 1969.
- Bass Pro Complex—The Complex includes a Cineplex Theatre, Chapters Bookstore and a Bass Pro Shop. The shopping complex is adjacent to Champlain Place and it is owned and operated by Cadillac Fairview.

== Media ==
- L'Étoile Dieppe - Édition Dieppe, provides news and information to the francophone population of New Brunswick's Dieppe area. L'Étoile - Édition Dieppe is published every Thursday and it is owned by Brunswick News.

== Transportation ==
=== Greater Moncton International Airport ===
The Greater Moncton International Airport was officially opened in 2002 by Queen Elizabeth II. It is 6 km (3.7 mi) from downtown Dieppe and 10 km (6.2 mi) from Moncton. Moncton Flight College, the largest private flight school in Canada, is at the airport. MFC has trained over 16,000 pilots from around the world since 1929.

=== Public transit ===
Codiac Transpo is the city of Moncton, Dieppe and town of Riverview's public transit system. Within Codiac transpo 47 bus fleet, three services Dieppe's main arteries and subdivisions seven days a week; in addition to its numerous fleet of Codiac Buses at the Champlain Place terminal. Services to the inner city has been offered since 1984. Services are provided seven days a week with late evening routes and modified weekend hours.

=== Roads and bridges ===
- Fox Creek Bridge — Inaugurated in 1982, the current bridge replaced the low-rise structure which was built in 1924. Some facts regarding the Fox Creek bridge from the June 8, 1982, edition of L'Evangeline newspaper. The present site of the Fox Creek bridge holds historical facts which dates back to the 1800s. A geographical map of the region made by the English forces shows families with the Amirault surnames living in the area. Later, Acadians built earthen dykes (aboiteau) at Pointe des renards to prevent flooding, which also served as "bridges" for both banks of the river. In 1924, a low-rise bridge was constructed that flooded every two to three years.
- Hall's Creek Bridge — The first Hall's Creek bridge in Moncton was built in 1867, which link the city with Leger's Corner via the Westmorland Road (Main Street). The current structure at the Wheeler Boulevard intersection opened in 1982.
- In the archives at the McCord Museum of Canadian History in Montreal, there is a postcard with the inscription of "Fox Creek Bridge". This postcard was mailed from Montreal, Quebec, on 23 September 1913 to a Miss Breau at 28 rue Victoria Street Moncton. A closer look seemingly reveals it to be the Halls Creek Bridge. It is unknown when the picture was taken; however, a small portion of downtown Moncton of the time is visible on the postcard.

Both bridges are on Route 106, which follows the original provincial Route 2 from Quebec to Nova Scotia. Through the late 1950s and 1960s, a number of bypasses and realignments, mostly two-lane, were built to improve Route 2 with federal Trans-Canada Highway funds. The first, built in the 1950s, was around Moncton. The old road became Route 2A, but it was renumbered Route 6 in 1965 and 106 in 1984 during a reclassification of provincial highways. It is still signed as Route 6 at the corner of Cameron St. and Main St. (the current Route 106) in downtown Moncton. At Moncton, Route 106 runs through Main Street and passes Hall's Creek bridge up to the intersection in centre-ville Dieppe connecting Amirault Street, which leaves the city to the southeast en route to Memramcook. The aforementioned route had a significant impact for the future community of Dieppe has it linked southeast New Brunswick to Nova Scotia prior to the completion of the new Trans-Canada Highway. In addition, it attracted new residents to cultivate the land and build dwellings throughout the 19th and 20th centuries.

== Sister cities ==
- Dieppe, Normandy, France
- Carencro, Louisiana, United States

== See also ==
- Media in Greater Moncton
- List of communities in New Brunswick
- Codiac Transpo
- List of events in Greater Moncton
- List of historic places in Westmorland County, New Brunswick
