= List of entertainment events in Greater Moncton =

This article is a list of major entertainment events held in Greater Moncton.

== Infrequent events ==
Infrequent events of over 5000 people in attendance.

Year	Category	Sub Category	Event name	Attendance	Main Venue	Notes/See also
1968	Sporting	Baseball	Canadian Junior Baseball Championships			
1974	Sporting	Figure Skating	Canadian Figure Skating Championships			
1977	Sporting	Figure Skating	Skate Canada International			
1978	Sporting	Ice Hockey	CIS University Cup			
1980	Sporting	Curling	World Men's Curling Championships			
1982	Sporting	Ice Hockey	CIS University Cup			
1983	Sporting	Ice Hockey	CIS University Cup			
1984	Religious	Catholic	Pope John Paul II - Pastoral Visit.	75,000	Magnetic Hill Concert Site	
1985	Sporting	Figure Skating	Canadian Figure Skating Championships			
1985	Sporting	Curling	Labatt Brier - The Canadian National Men's Curling Championship			
1989	Music	Classic rock	Beach Boys - Still Cruisin' Tour	20,000	Parlee Beach Provincial Park	Beach Boys
1992	Sporting	Figure Skating	Canadian Figure Skating Championships		Moncton Coliseum	
1997	Sporting	Baseball	World Junior Baseball Championship			
1998	Music	Classic rock	Classic Rock Festival	35,000	Magnetic Hill Concert Site	Lynyrd Skynyrd, Foreigner, Peter Frampton, Steppenwolf, Heart
2000	Sporting	Curling	Canadian Junior Curling Championships		Moncton Coliseum	
2004	Sporting	Baseball	Canadian Senior Baseball Championships			
2005	Music	Classic rock	The Rolling Stones - A Bigger Bang Tour	85,000	Magnetic Hill Concert Site	
2006	Sporting	Ice Hockey	Memorial Cup (Canadian Hockey League Championships)		Moncton Coliseum	
2006	Music	Country Music	Country Rocks the Hill	45,000	Magnetic Hill Concert Site	Brooks & Dunn, Alan Jackson
2007	Sporting	Ice Hockey	CIS University Cup			
2007	Music	Country music	Soul2Soul II Tour	50,000	Magnetic Hill Concert Site	
2008	Sporting	Ice Hockey	CIS University Cup			
2008	Music	Classic rock	The Eagles. - Long Road Out of Eden Tour.	55,000	Magnetic Hill Concert Site	
2009	Music	Classic rock	AC/DC. - Black Ice Tour.	70,000	Magnetic Hill Concert Site	
2010	Sporting	Athletics	World Junior Championships in Athletics	75,000	Moncton Stadium	
2011	Music	Classic rock	U2. - 360° Tour.	75,000	Magnetic Hill Concert Site	
2012	Music	Rock	Nickelback - Here And Now Tour	23,000	Magnetic Hill Concert Site	Nickelback, My Darkest Days, Three Days Grace, Arkells, I Mother Earth, Gloryhound
2012	Music	Classic rock	Bruce Springsteen - Wrecking Ball Tour	30,200	Magnetic Hill Concert Site	Bruce Springsteen and the E Street Band, Tom Cochrane & Red Rider, The Trews
2012	Sporting	Figure Skating	Canadian Figure Skating Championships		Moncton Coliseum	
2013	Sporting	Athletics	Canadian Track & Field Championships		Moncton Stadium	
2014	Sporting	Athletics	Canadian Track & Field Championships		Moncton Stadium	
2014	Sporting	Soccer	FIFA U-20 Women's World Cup		Moncton Stadium	
2015	Sporting	Soccer	2015 FIFA Women's World Cup		Moncton Stadium	
2015	Music	Classic rock	AC/DC - Rock or Bust World Tour	50,000	Magnetic Hill Concert Site	
2017	Sporting	Curling	2017 Canadian U18 Curling Championships		Superior Propane Centre	
2017	Sporting	Ice Hockey	2017 CHL Canada/Russia Series		Moncton Coliseum	
2018	Sporting	MMA	UFC Fight Night: Volkan vs. Smith	6,282	Avenir Centre	
2019	Music	Country	Luke Bryan	25,000	Magnetic Hill Concert Site	
2019	Sporting	Ice Hockey	2019 CHL Canada/Russia Series		Avenir Centre	
2023	Sporting	Ice Hockey	2023 World Junior Ice Hockey Championships		Avenir Centre	Co-hosted with Halifax, Nova Scotia
2024	Sporting	Ice Hockey	2024 Kubota CHL/NHL Top Prospects Game		Avenir Centre	

== Annual events ==
Event name	Established	Category	Sub Category	Last Attendance	Main Venue	Notes
Dieppe Kite International.	2001	Sporting	Kite flying		Dover Park	
The Frye Festival.	2000	Arts	Literary	15,000	University of Moncton	
HubCap Comedy Festival.	2000	Arts	Comedy		Various	
Touchdown Atlantic	2010	Sporting	Football		Moncton Stadium	
Atlantic Nationals Automotive Extravaganza.	2000	Transportation	Automotive		Moncton Coliseum	
World Wine & Food Expo.	1990	Arts	Food & Drink		Moncton Coliseum	
Shediac Lobster Festival.	1950	Arts	Food & Drink		Shediac Festival Grounds	
Mosaïq Multicultural Festival.	2004	Festival	Multicultural	5,000	Moncton City Hall Plaza	

== See also ==
- Moncton
- Riverview
- Dieppe
