= New Brunswick Interscholastic Athletic Association =

School Sport New Brunswick (formerly New Brunswick Interscholastic Athletic Association)
- Type: Sports governing body
- Headquarters: Fredericton, New Brunswick
- Location: New Brunswick
- Members: 78 New Brunswick high schools
- Official language: English, French
- President: Rodney Buggie
- Vice president: Colin Theriault
- Executive Director: Eric Moffatt
- Website: https://www.ss-nb.org/

School Sport New Brunswick or "SSNB" (formerly the New Brunswick Interscholastic Athletic Association, or NBIAA, (French: l'Association sportive interscolaire du Nouveau-Brunswick, ASINB) is the governing body for high school sports in New Brunswick, Canada. As with all of Canada's provincial high school athletics associations, SSNB is a member of School Sport Canada (SSC).

== Events ==
School Sport NB hosts 17 sport events:

=== Fall sports ===
- Baseball
- Cross country
- Field hockey
- Football
- Golf
- Soccer
- Softball
- Swimming

=== Winter sports ===
- Basketball
- Cheerleading
- Hockey
- Wrestling

=== Spring sports ===
- Badminton
- Rugby
- Track and field
- Volleyball
- Ultimate Frisbee

== Northern Conference Members ==
=== AAA Schools ===
- École Secondaire Népisiguit

=== AA Schools ===
- Bathurst High School
- James M. Hill High School
- Polyvalente Louis-Mailloux
- École Marie-Esther
- Miramichi Valley High School
- Sugarloaf Senior High School
- Polyvalente W.Arthur-Losier

=== A Schools ===
- École Aux quatre vents
- Blackville School
- École Carrefour Beausoleil
- Central NB Academy
- Centre La fontaine
- Dalhousie Regional High School
- North & South Esk Regional School
- École Régionale-de-Baie-Sainte-Anne
- Polyvalente Roland-Pépin
- Stanley High School

== Eastern Conference Members ==
=== AAA Schools ===
- Bernice MacNaughton High School
- Harrison Trimble High School
- École L’Odyssée
- École Mathieu-Martin
- Moncton High School
- Riverview High School

=== AA Schools ===
- Bonar Law Memorial High School
- École Clément-Cormier
- Salisbury Regional School
- École Louis-J.-Robichaud
- Tantramar Regional High School

=== A Schools ===
- Belleisle Regional High School
- Caledonia Regional High School
- Cambridge-Narrows School
- Chipman Forest Avenue School
- City Impact Academy
- École Étoile de l'Acadie
- École Mgr-M.-F.-Richard
- Minto Memorial High School
- Moncton Christian School
- Petitcodiac Regional School
- Sussex Christian School

== Southern Conference Members ==
=== AAA Schools ===
- Harbour View High School
- Kennebecasis Valley High School
- Saint John High School
- Simonds High School
- St. Malachy's High School
- Sussex Regional High School

=== AA Schools ===
- Fundy High School
- Hampton High School
- Rothesay High School
- St. Stephen High School

=== A Schools ===
- Campobello Island Consolidated School
- Charlotte County Christian Academy
- Grand Manan Community School
- Harvey High School
- McAdam High School
- Rothesay Netherwood School
- École Samuel-de-Champlain
- Sir James Dunn Academy
- Valley Christian Academy

== Western Conference ==
=== AAA Schools ===
- Cité-des-Jeunes-A.-M. Sormany
- Fredericton High School
- Leo Hayes High School
- Oromocto High School

=== AA Schools ===
- Carleton North High School
- École Sainte-Anne
- Polyvalente Thomas-Albert
- Woodstock High School

=== A Schools ===
- Polyvalente A.J. Savoie
- Canterbury High School
- Fredericton Christian Academy
- École Grande-Rivière
- Hartland Community School
- John Caldwell School
- École Marie-Gaétane
- Nackawic Senior High School
- Saint Mary’s Academy
- Southern Victoria High School
- Tobique Valley High School
