= List of schools in New Brunswick =

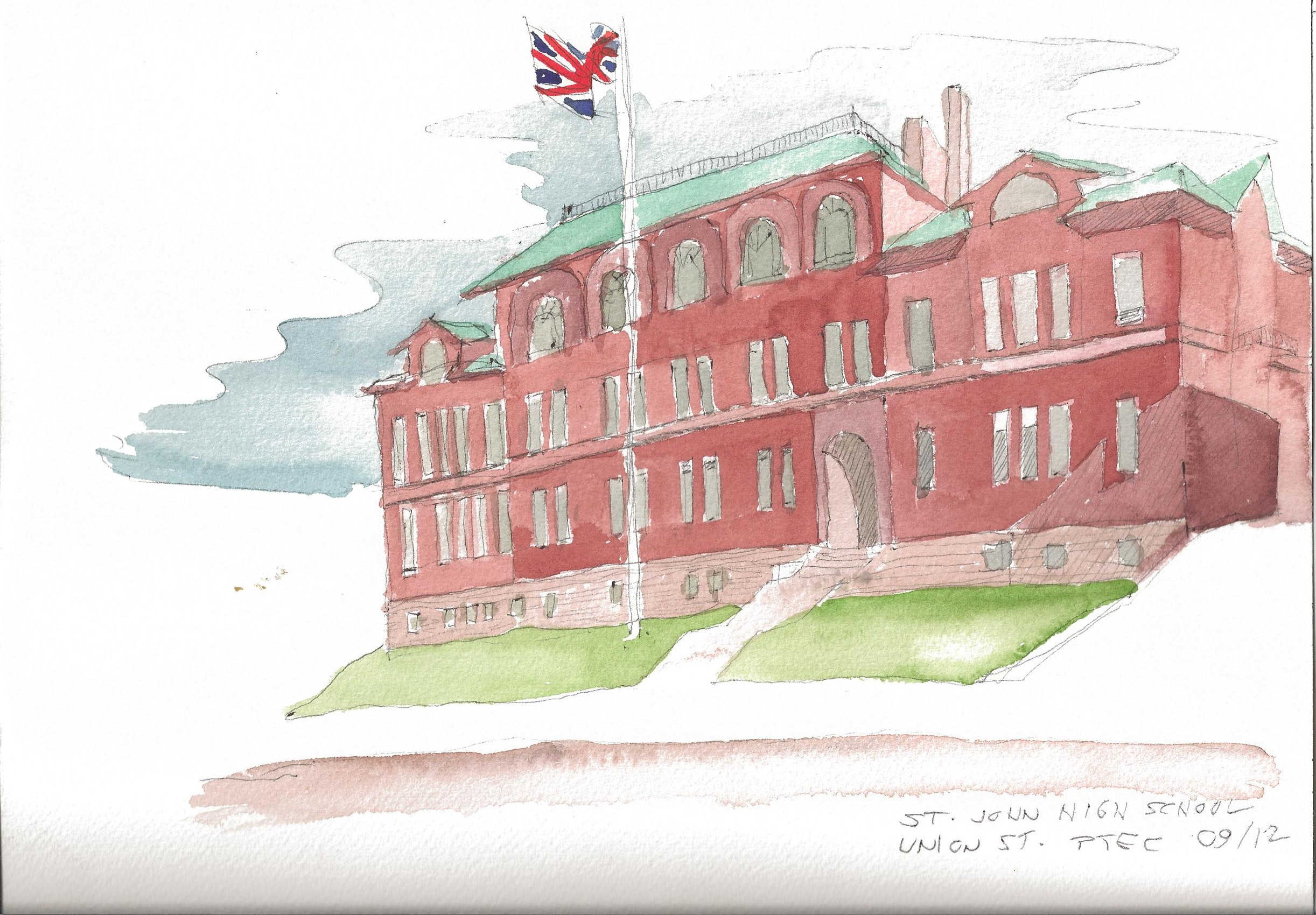
Watercolor drawing of the former Saint John High School building (1897-1932)

The following contains lists of schools in the Canadian province of New Brunswick into public school, private schools, and former school categories.

New Brunswick has four Anglophone school districts and three Francophone school districts:

- Anglophone North School District (ASD-N)
- Anglophone South School District (ASD-S)
- Anglophone East School District (ASD-E)
- Anglophone West School District (ASD-W)
- Francophone Nord-Est School District (DSFN-E)
- Francophone Nord-Ouest School District (DSFN-O)
- Francophone Sud School District

== List of New Brunswick public grade schools ==
The following are all New Brunswick public schools listed according to the district by which they are managed, and by county.

=== Anglophone North School District ===
==== Restigouche County ====
School name	Municipality	Start	End	Photograph	Source
Lord Beaverbrook	Campbellton	K	4		Official site
L. E. Reinsborough	Dalhousie	K	5		Official site
Campbellton Middle School	Campbellton	5	8		Official site
Sugarloaf Senior High	Campbellton	9	12		Official site
Dalhousie Regional	Dalhousie	9	12		Official site

==== Gloucester County ====
School name	Municipality	Start	End	Photograph	Source
Janeville Elementary School	Janeville	K	5		Official site
Bathurst High	Bathurst	9	12		Official site
Jacquet River School	Belledune	K	8		Official site
Parkwood Heights Elementary School	Bathurst	K	5		Official site
Superior Middle School	Bathurst	6	8		Official site
Terry Fox Elementary School	Bathurst	K	5		Official site

==== Northumberland County ====
School name	Municipality	Start	End	Photograph	Source
Tabusintac School	Tabusintac	K	8		Official site
Millerton	Derby	K	8		Official site
Max Aitken Academy	Miramichi	K	8		Official site
Metepenagiag School	Metepenagiag	K	6		Official site
Natoaganeg School	Eel Ground First Nation	K	8		Official site
Gretna Green	Miramichi	K	8		Official site
Esgenoopetitj School	Esgenoopetitj	K	8		Official site
Nelson Rural	Miramichi	K	8		Official site
Miramichi Rural	Miramichi Bay	K	8		Official site
Napan Elementary	Napan	K	5		Official site
North and South Esk Elementary	Sunny Corner	K	6		Official site
Dr. Losier Middle	Miramichi	6	8		Official site
Blackville School	Miramichi River Valley	K	12		Official site
James M. Hill Memorial High	Miramichi	9	12		Official site
Miramichi Valley High	Miramichi	9	12		Official site
North and South Esk Regional High	Sunny Corner	7	12		Official site
King Street Elementary	Miramichi	K	5		Official site

==== Kent County ====
School name	Municipality	Start	End	Photograph	Source
Elsipogtog	Elsipogtog First Nation	K	8		Official site
Bonar Law Memorial High	Five Rivers	9	12		Official site
Eleanor W. Graham Middle	Richibucto	6	8		Official site
Harcourt School	Harcourt	K	5		Official site
Rexton Elementary	Five Rivers	K	5		Official site

=== Anglophone South School District ===
==== Saint John County ====
School name	Municipality	Start	End	Photograph	Source
Dr. Christine Davies	Saint John	9	12		
St. Martins Elementary	Fundy-St. Martins	K	8		
Bayview Elementary	Saint John	K	5		
Centennial Elementary	Saint John	K	5		
Champlain Heights	Saint John	K	5		
Glen Falls Elementary	Saint John	K	5		
Island View Elementary	Saint John	K	5		
Lakewood Heights Elementary	Saint John	K	5		
Loch Lomond Elementary	Saint John	K	5		
M. Gerald Teed Memorial	Saint John	K	2		
Morna Heights Elementary	Saint John	K	5		
Saint Rose School	Saint John	K	5		
Westfield Elementary	Saint John	K	5		
Forest Hills Elementary	Saint John	K	8		
Hazen White-St. Francis	Saint John	K	8		
Millidgeville North	Saint John	3	8		
Prince Charles Elementary	Saint John	K	8		
Princess Elizabeth	Saint John	K	8		
St. John the Baptist/King Edward	Saint John	K	8		
Barnhill Memorial	Saint John	6	8		
Bayside Middle	Saint John	6	8		
Beaconsfield Middle	Saint John	6	8		
Simonds Middle	Saint John	6	8		
Harbour View High	Saint John	9	12		
Saint John High	Saint John	9	12		
St. Malachy's Memorial	Saint John	9	12		
Simonds High	Saint John	9	12		
Woodlawn Learning Centre	Saint John	9	12		

==== Charlotte County ====
School name	Municipality	Start	End	Photograph	Source
Back Bay	Back Bay	K	6		
Blacks Harbour	Blacks Harbour	K	6		
Deer Island Community	Deer Island	K	8		
Lawrence Station	Lawrence Station	K	5		
Pennfield Elementary	Pennfield	K	4		
Vincent Massey Elementary	St. Andrews	K	6		
St. George Elementary	St. George	K	6		
Milltown Elementary	St. Stephen	K	5		
St. Stephen Elementary	St. Stephen	K	5		
St. Stephen Middle	St. Stephen	6	8		
Campobello Island Consolidated	Campobello Island	K	12		
Grand Manan Community	Grand Manan	K	12		
Sir James Dunn	St. Andrews	7	12		
Fundy High	St. George	7	12		
St. Stephen High	St. Stephen	9	12		
White Head Elementary	White Head Island	K	6		

==== Kings County ====
School name	Municipality	Start	End	Photograph	Source
Dr. A. T. Leatherbarrow	Hampton	K	2		
Hammond River Valley	Hampton	K	5		
Hampton Elementary	Hampton	K	5		
Macdonald Consolidated	Kingston	K	8		
Norton Elementary	Valley Waters	K	5		
Lakefield Elementary	Quispamsis	K	5		
Quispamsis Elementary	Quispamsis	K	5		
Fairvale Elementary	Rothesay	K	5		
Kennebecasis Park	Rothesay	K	5		
Rothesay Elementary	Rothesay	K	5		
Chris Saunders Elementary	Quispamsis	K	5		
Belleisle Elementary	Belleisle	K	5		
Sussex Elementary	Sussex	K	5		
Sussex Corner Elementary	Sussex Corner	K	5		
Hampton Middle	Hampton	6	8		
Quispamsis Middle	Quispamsis	6	8		
Harry Miller Middle	Rothesay	6	8		
Sussex Middle	Sussex	6	8		
Rothesay Park	Rothesay	6	8		
Hampton High	Hampton	9	12		
Kennebecasis Valley High	Quispamsis	9	12		
Rothesay High	Rothesay	9	12		
Belleisle Regional	Belleisle	6	12		
Sussex Regional High	Sussex	9	12		
Browns Flat	Browns Flat	K	5		
Fundy Shores	Dipper Harbour	K	8		
Grand Bay Primary	Grand Bay-Westfield	K	2		
Inglewood Elementary	Grand Bay-Westfield	K	5		
River Valley	Grand Bay-Westfield	6	8		

=== Anglophone East School District ===
==== Albert County ====
School name	Municipality	Start	End	Photograph	Source
Claude D. Taylor	Riverview	K	5		Official site
Frank L. Bowser	Riverview	K	5		Official site
West Riverview	Riverview	K	5		Official site
Riverview East	Riverview	K	5		Official site
Hillsborough Elementary	Hillsborough	K	5		Official site
Riverside Consolidated	Riverside-Albert	K	8		Official site
Riverview Middle	Riverview	6	8		Official site
Caledonia Regional High	Hillsborough	6	12		Official site
Riverview High	Riverview	9	12		Official site

==== Kings County ====
School name	Municipality	Start	End	Photograph	Source
Havelock	Havelock	K	8		Official site

==== Westmorland County ====
School name	Municipality	Start	End	Photograph	Source
Forest Glen	Moncton	K	4		Official site
Arnold H. McLeod	Moncton	K	5		Official site
Salem Elementary	Sackville	K	4		Official site
Salisbury Elementary	Salisbury	K	4		Official site
Mountain View	Irishtown	K	5		Official site
Northrop Frye	Moncton	K	8		Official site
Lou MacNarin	Dieppe	K	5		Official site
Dorchester Consolidated	Dorchester	K	8		Official site
Port Elgin Regional	Strait Shores	K	8		Official site
Shediac Cape	Shediac	K	8		Official site
Magnetic Hill	Lutes Mountain	K	8		Official site
Beaverbrook	Moncton	K	8		Official site
Bessborough	Moncton	K	8		Official site
Birchmount	Moncton	K	8		Official site
Edith Cavell	Moncton	K	8		Official site
Evergreen Park	Moncton	K	8		Official site
Hillcrest	Moncton	K	8		Official site
Queen Elizabeth	Moncton	K	8		Official site
Lewisville Middle	Moncton	6	8		Official site
Maplehurst Middle	Moncton	6	8		Official site
Sunny Brae	Moncton	5	8		Official site
Marshview Middle	Sackville	5	8		Official site
Petitcodiac Regional	Three Rivers	K	12		Official site
Salisbury Regional	Salisbury	5	12		Official site
Harrison Trimble	Moncton	9	12		Official site
Bernice MacNaughton	Moncton	9	12		Official site
Moncton High	Moncton	9	12		Official site
Tantramar Regional	Sackville	9	12		Official site

=== Anglophone West School District ===
==== Carleton County ====
School name	Municipality	Start	End	Photograph	Source
Bath Community	Bath	K	8		Official site
Bristol Elementary	Florenceville-Bristol	K	5		Official site
Centreville Community	Centreville	K	8		Official site
Florenceville Elementary	Florenceville-Bristol	K	5		Official site
Hartland Community	Hartland	K	12		Official site
Townsview	Woodstock	K	8		Official site
Meduxnekeag Consolidated	Woodstock	K	8		Official site
Florenceville Middle	Florenceville-Bristol	6	8		Official site
Carleton North High	Florenceville-Bristol	9	12		Official site
Woodstock High	Woodstock	9	12		Official site

==== Madawaska County ====
School name	Municipality	Start	End	Photograph	Source
Saint Mary's Academy	Edmundston	K	12		Official site

==== Northumberland County ====
School name	Municipality	Start	End	Photograph	Source
Doaktown Elementary	Doaktown	K	5		Official site
Upper Miramichi Elementary	Boiestown	K	5		Official site
Central New Brunswick Academy	New Bandon	6	12		Official site

==== Queens County ====
School name	Municipality	Start	End	Photograph	Source
Chipman Elementary	Chipman	K	5		Official site
Gagetown School	Arcadia	K	8		Official site
Minto Elementary Middle	Minto	K	8		Official site
Cambridge-Narrows Community	Arcadia	K	12		Official site
Chipman Forest Avenue	Chipman	6	12		Official site
Minto Memorial	Minto	9	12		Official site

==== Victoria County ====
School name	Municipality	Start	End	Photograph	Source
Andover Elementary	Perth-Andover	K	5		Official site
Donald Fraser Memorial	Tobique Valley	K	5		Official site
Perth-Andover Middle	Perth-Andover	6	8		Official site
John Caldwell	Grand Falls	K	12		Official site
Southern Victoria High	Perth-Andover	9	12		Official site
Tobique Valley High	Tobique Valley	6	12		Official site

==== Sunbury County ====
School name	Municipality	Start	End	Photograph	Source
Assiniboine Avenue Elementary	Oromocto	K	2		Official site
Gesner Street Elementary	Oromocto	K	2		Official site
Hubbard Elementary	Oromocto	3	5		Official site
Summerhill Street Elementary	Oromocto	3	5		Official site
Burton Elementary	Burton	K	2		Official site
Lincoln Elementary Community	Lincoln	K	2		Official site
Geary Elementary Community	Geary	K	5		Official site
Sunbury West	Fredericton Junction	K	8		Official site
Ridgeview Middle	Oromocto	6	8		Official site
Harold Peterson Middle	Oromocto	6	8		Official site
Oromocto High	Oromocto	9	12		Official site

==== York County ====
School name	Municipality	Start	End	Photograph	Source
Nackawic Elementary	Nackawic-Millville	K	5		Official site
Nackawic Middle	Nackawic-Millville	6	8		Official site
Canterbury High	Lakeland Ridges	K	12		Official site
Nackawic High	Nackawic-Millville	9	12		Official site
Nashwaak Valley	Durham Bridge	K	5		Official site
Gibson-Neill Memorial Elementary	Fredericton	K	5		Official site
Bliss Carman Middle	Fredericton	6	8		Official site
Barkers Point Elementary	Fredericton	K	5		Official site
Connaught Street Elementary	Fredericton	K	5		Official site
Cuffman Street Elementary	Fredericton	K	5		Official site
Forest Hill Elementary	Fredericton	K	1		Official site
Garden Creek	Fredericton	K	5		Official site
Kingsclear Community	Fredericton	K	5		Official site
Liverpool Street Elementary	Fredericton	2	5		Official site
McAdam Avenue	Fredericton	K	5		Official site
Montgomery Street Elementary	Fredericton	K	5		Official site
Nashwaaksis Memorial Elementary	Fredericton	K	5		Official site
Park Street Elementary	Fredericton	K	5		Official site
Priestman Street Elementary	Fredericton	K	5		Official site
Royal Road Elementary	Fredericton	K	5		Official site
Harvey Elementary	Harvey Station	K	5		Official site
Keswick Ridge	Keswick Ridge	K	8		Official site
McAdam Elementary	McAdam	K	5		Official site
New Maryland Elementary	New Maryland	K	5		Official site
Stanley Consolidated	Nashwaak	K	12		Official site
Devon Middle	Fredericton	6	8		Official site
George Street Middle	Fredericton	6	8		Official site
Nashwaaksis Middle	Fredericton	6	8		Official site
Harvey High	Harvey Station	6	12		Official site
McAdam High	McAdam	6	12		Official site
Fredericton High	Fredericton	9	12		Official site
Leo Hayes High	Fredericton	9	12		Official site
Keswick Valley Memorial	Burtts Corner	K	8		Official site
Hanwell Park Academy	Hanwell	K	8		Official site

=== Francophone Nord-Est School District ===
==== Restigouche County ====
School name	Municipality	Start	End	Photograph	Source
Versant-Nord	Atholville	K	8		
Le Domaine-des-Copains	Balmoral	K	8		
Apollo-XI	Campbellton	K	6		
Notre-Dame	Dalhousie	K	8		
Le Coin-des-Amis	Dundee	K	6		
Le Tournesol	Petit-Rocher	K	3		
Séjour-Jeunesse	Pointe-Verte	K	8		
Le Rendez-vous-des-Jeunes	Saint-Arthur	K	6		
Mgr-Melanson	Val-d'Amour	K	6		
Roland-Pépin	Campbellton	7	12		
Aux quatre vents	Dalhousie	9	12		
Arthur-Pinet	Eel River Crossing	K	8		

==== Gloucester County ====
School name	Municipality	Start	End	Photograph	Source
François-Xavier-Daigle	Allardville	K	8		
Assomption	Bathurst	K	5		
Cité-de-l'Amitié	Bathurst	K	5		
Carrefour-Étudiant	Beresford	K	8		
Le Domaine-Étudiant	Petit-Rocher	4	8		
La Croisée de Robertville	Robertville	K	8		
La Découverte-de-Saint-Sauveur	Saint-Sauveur	K	6		
Place-des-Jeunes	Bathurst	6	8		
Secondaire Népisiguit	Bathurst	9	12		
l’Escale-des-Jeunes	Bas-Caraquet	K	8		
Ola-Léger	Bertrand	K	8		
Marguerite-Bourgeoys	Caraquet	K	8		
Sœur-Saint-Alexandre	Lamèque	K	8		
Terre-des-Jeunes	Hautes-Terres	K	8		
La-Rivière	Pokemouche	K	8		
La Passerelle	Pont-Landry	K	8		
l’Étincelle	Ste-Marie-St-Raphaël	K	8		
La Relève	Hautes-Terres	K	8		
Le Maillon	Saint-Léolin	K	4		
La Source	Tracadie-Sheila	K	8		
La Ruche	Tracadie-Sheila	K	5		
La Villa des Amis	Tracadie Beach	K	8		
Léandre-LeGresley	Grande-Anse	5	8		
Le Tremplin	Tracadie-Sheila	6	8		
Louis-Mailloux	Caraquet	9	12		
Marie-Esther	Shippagan	9	12		
W.-Arthur-Losier	Tracadie-Sheila	9	12		

==== Northumberland County ====
School name	Municipality	Start	End	Photograph	Source
René-Chouinard	Lagacéville	K	8		
l’Amitié	Rivière-du-Portage	K	8		
Centre La fontaine	Neguac	K	12		

=== Francophone Nord-Ouest School District ===
==== Victoria County ====
School name	Municipality	Start	End	Photograph	Source
Académie Notre-Dame	Drummond	K	6		
Marie-Immaculée	Grand Falls	K	6		
Sacré-Coeur	Grand Falls	K	6		
Mgr-Lang	Drummond	7	8		

==== Madawaska County ====
School name	Municipality	Start	End	Photograph	Source
Centre d’apprentissage du Haut-Madawaska	Clair	K	8		
Notre-Dame	Edmundston	K	8		
Carrefour de la Jeunesse	Edmundston	K	8		
Mgr-Matthieu-Mazerolle	Riviere-Verte	8	12		
Saint-André	Saint-André	K	6		
Saint-Basile	Saint-Basile	K	8		
Sainte-Anne	Sainte-Anne-de-Madawaska	K	8		
Ernest-Lang	Saint-François-de-Madawaska	K	8		
Saint-Jacques	Edmundston	K	8		
Saint-Joseph	Saint-Joseph-de-Madawaska	K	8		
Cité des Jeunes A.-M.-Sormany	Edmundston	9	12		
Thomas-Albert	Grand Falls	9	12		
Grande-Rivière	Saint-Leonard	K	12		
A.-J.-Savoie	Saint-Quentin	7	12		

==== Restigouche County ====
School name	Municipality	Start	End	Photograph	Source
Echo Jeunesse	Kedgwick	K	7		
Mgr-Martin	Saint-Quentin	1	6		
Marie-Gaétane	Kedgwick	8	12		

=== Francophone Sud School District ===
==== Westmorland County ====
School name	Municipality	Start	End	Photograph	Source
Amirault	Dieppe	K	2		
Sainte-Therèse	Dieppe	K	2		
Champlain	Moncton	K	8		
Saint-Henri	Moncton	K	5		
Sainte-Bernadette	Moncton	K	5		
Abbey-Landry	Memramcook	K	8		
Anna-Malenfant	Dieppe	K	5		
Carrefour de l'Acadie	Moncton	6	8		
Le Mascaret	Dieppe	6	8		
Mathieu-Martin	Dieppe	9	12		
L'Odyssée	Moncton	9	12		
Donat-Robichaud	Cap-Pelé	K	8		
Père-Edgar-T.-LeBlanc	Grand-Barachois	K	8		
Mgr-François-Bourgeois	Shediac	K	8		
Louis-J.-Robichaud	Shediac	9	12		
Antonine-Maillet	Dieppe	6	8		
École Le Marais	Dieppe	3	5		
École Le Sommet	Moncton	K	8		

==== Kent County ====
School name	Municipality	Start	End	Photograph	Source
Blanche-Bourgeois	Cocagne	K	8		
Calixte-F.-Savoie	Sainte-Anne-de-Kent	K	8		
Dr-Marguerite-Michaud	Bouctouche	K	8		
Grande-Digue	Grande-Digue	K	8		
Notre-Dame	Notre-Dame-de-Kent	K	8		
Soleil Levant	Richibucto	K	8		
Camille-Vautour	Champdoré	K	8		
Marée Montante	Saint-Louis-de-Kent	K	8		
Saint-Paul	Saint-Paul	K	8		
Mont-Carmel	Sainte-Marie-de-Kent	K	8		
Clement-Cormier	Bouctouche	9	12		
Mgr-Marcel-François-Richard	Saint-Louis-de-Kent	9	12		

==== Saint John County ====
School name	Municipality	Start	End	Photograph	Source
Samuel-de-Champlain	Saint John	K	12		

==== Kings County ====
School name	Municipality	Start	End	Photograph	Source
École des Pionniers	Quispamsis	K	5		

==== Sunbury County ====
School name	Municipality	Start	End	Photograph	Source
Des Bâtisseurs	Fredericton	K	5		
Arc-en-Ciel	Oromocto	K	8		

==== York County ====
School name	Municipality	Start	End	Photograph	Source
Sainte-Anne	Fredericton	6	12		
École Les Éclaireurs	Fredericton	K	8		

==== Northumberland County ====
School name	Municipality	Start	End	Photograph	Source
Régionale de Baie-Sainte-Anne	Baie-Sainte-Anne	K	12		
Carrefour Beausoleil	Miramichi	K	12		
Étoile de l'Acadie	Nouvelle-Arcadie	K	12		

== List of New Brunswick private schools ==
The following are private schools in New Brunswick.

School name	Municipality	Start	End	Photograph	Source
Rothesay Netherwood School	Rothesay	6	12		
Valley Christian Academy	Quispamsis	K	12		
Touchstone Academy	Rothesay	PK	5		
Origins Academy	Quispamsis	K	5		
Charlotte County Christian Academy	Pennfield	K	12		
Divine Mercy Catholic School	Saint John	K	8		
Sussex Christian School	Sussex	PK	12		
Fredericton Christian Academy	Fredericton	K	12		
Our Lady of Grace Catholic School	New Maryland	K	10		
River Valley Christian Academy	Nackawic-Millville	K	8		
Eastgate Academy	Riverview	K	7		

== List of defunct schools in New Brunswick ==
The following are defunct schools in New Brunswick.

School name	Municipality	Year Open	Year closed	Fate of School	Source
Uplands School	Moncton		2014	Demolished	
Upper Miramichi Regional High School	Boiestown		2010	Replaced	
Aberdeen High School	Moncton	1898	1970's	Converted to Cultural Centre	
Gunningsville School	Riverview		2013	Replaced	
Lower Coverdale School	Lower Coverdale		2013	Replaced	
Southampton Regional High School	Southampton		1960s	Demolished	
Moncton High School (1898)	Moncton		2015	To be Determined	
St. Patrick's Elementary	Saint John		2014	To be Determined	
Havelock Elementary	Saint John		2016	Demolished	
Seawood Elementary	Saint John		2016	turned into daycare	
École Acadieville	Acadieville			Demolished	
Marguerite-Bourgeois	Saint-Louis-de-Kent		Before 2001	turned into call center in 2001 to 2012 - Demolished 2017	
Philippe-Bourgeois	Saint-Louis-de-Kent			Demolished	
Téléphore-Arsenault	Richibucto		1991	new school build Ecole Soleil Levant - turn into apartments	
Edgar-Poirier	Richibucto		1991	new school build Ecole Soleil Levant - Converted to Cultural Centre	
Marée-mantante	Saint-Louis-de-Kent			Combined with Mgr Marcel-François-Richard	
Saint-Paul	Saint-paul-de-Kent		2016	Demolished 2019 or 2020	
W.-F. Boisvert	Nouvelle-Arcadie			combined with Etoile de l'Acadie	
Secondaire Assomption	Nouvelle-Arcadie			combined with Etoile de l'Acadie	
Richibucto-Village	Richibucto-Village			turned into a community center	
Douglas Elementary	Douglas	1873	2011	Sold to private citizen	
Elgin Elementary	Elgin		2002	Shut down due to excessive repair costs	

== See also ==
- List of school districts in New Brunswick
- List of schools in Canada
- List of schools in Moncton
