= New Brunswick School District 10 =

Defunct New Brunswick school district

School District 10 is a defunct Canadian school district in New Brunswick. It was an Anglophone district operating 16 public schools (gr. K-12) in Charlotte County. Enrollment was approximately 4,000 students and 350 teachers. District 10 was headquartered in St. Stephen. In 2012 it was amalgamated into Anglophone South School District.

== List of schools ==
=== High schools ===
- Fundy High School
- Sir James Dunn Academy
- St. Stephen High School

=== Middle schools ===
- St. Stephen Middle School

=== Elementary schools ===
- Back Bay Elementary School
- Blacks Harbour School
- Lawrence Station Elementary School
- Milltown Elementary School

Pennfield Elementary School

- St. George Elementary School
- St. Stephen Elementary School
- Vincent Massey Elementary School
- White Head Elementary School

=== Combined schools ===
- Deer Island Community School
- Fundy Shores School
- Campobello Island Consolidated School
- Grand Manan Community School

=== Other schools ===
- St. Stephen High School (LC)
