= New Brunswick School District 14 =

Defunct Canadian school district in New Brunswick

Location
- Woodstock, New Brunswick; Canada

District information
- Grades: K–12
- Closed: 2012 (absorbed into Anglophone West School District)
- Schools: 30

Students and staff
- Students: c. 8,500
- Teachers: c. 570

School District 14 is a defunct Canadian school district in New Brunswick. It was an Anglophone district operating 30 public schools (gr. K-12) in York, Carleton, Victoria and Madawaska counties. Enrollment was approximately 8,500 students and 570 teachers. District 14 is headquartered in Woodstock. In 2012, it was amalgamated into Anglophone West School District.

== List of schools ==
=== High schools ===
- Canterbury
- Carleton North
- Nackawic
- Southern Victoria
- Tobique Valley
- Woodstock

=== Middle schools ===
- Bath
- Florenceville
- Nackawic
- Perth-Andover
- Woodstock

=== Elementary schools ===
- Andover
- Bath
- Bristol
- Debec
- Donald Fraser Memorial
- Florenceville
- Juniper
- Millville
- Nackawic
- Southern Carleton
- Woodstock Centennial

=== Combined elementary and middle schools ===
- Centreville Community School
- Keswick Valley Memorial

=== Private schools ===
- Apostolic Christian School
- Perth Seventh-day Adventist School
- River Valley Christian Academy
- Riverdale
- Somerville Christian Academy
- St. John Valley Mennonite School
- Woodstock Christian Academy

=== Other schools ===
- Hartland Community School
- John Caldwell
- Saint Mary's Academy
