= List of school districts in New Brunswick =

There are seven school districts in the province of New Brunswick, Canada, each with their elected councils. The Minister of Education in New Brunswick is currently Claire Johnson, replacing Bill Hogan.

Established under the Education Act of New Brunswick, a District Education Council (DEC) provides a local governance and community input mechanism at the district level. DECs consist of 11 to 13 education councillors elected for four-year terms, with responsibility for elections given to the Elections NB corporation, officiated by the Chief Administrative Officer.

== Current school districts ==
School district	Headquarters	Enrollment (2018–19)	Teachers (2018–19)	Teacher/student ratio (2017–18)	Graduation rate	Withdrawal rate (2017–18)
Anglophone North	Miramichi	7,266	675	10.8		1.9%
Anglophone South	Saint John	22,903	1,763	13.0		1.2%
Anglophone East	Moncton	15,924	1,212	13.1		1.2%
Anglophone West	Fredericton	22,663	1,763	12.9		1.2%
Francophone Nord-Est	Tracadie-Sheila	9,126	773	11.8		1.2%
Francophone Nord-Ouest	Edmundston	5,218	430	12.1		0.9%
Francophone Sud	Dieppe	14,795	1,114	13.3		0.5%

== History ==
=== Merging and renaming of 2012 ===
As of September 2012, the Government of New Brunswick decided to merge and rename all the school districts changing the number of districts from 14 to 7. By doing this, the provinces minister of education estimates $5 million would be saved in administrative costs. This was done by merging by language, francophone and anglophone as described below:

- Anglophone West was created by merging districts 14, 17, and 18.
- Anglophone South was created by merging districts 6, 8, and 10.
- Anglophone East was previously known as district 2.
- Anglophone North was created by merging districts 15 and 16.
- Francophone Sud was created by merging districts 1 and 11.
- Francophone Nord-Ouest was previously known as district 3.
- Francophone Nord-Est was created by merging districts 5 and 9.

== See also ==
- List of schools in New Brunswick
- Administrative divisions of New Brunswick
