= New Brunswick School District 18 =

School district in New Brunswick, Canada

School District 18 was a Canadian school district in New Brunswick.

District 18 was an Anglophone district operating 32 public schools (gr. K-12) in York and Northumberland counties.

District 18 enrollment was approximately 12,500 students and 800 teachers. District 18 was headquartered in Fredericton.

Dianne Wilkins was the superintendent of District 18 from April 18, 2011, until June 30, 2012.

In 2012, the provincial government announced a series of amalgamations of New Brunswick school districts. A new district named Anglophone West School District was created to take effect on July 1, 2012. This new district includes the schools that were formerly under the jurisdiction of School Districts 14, 17, and 18. David McTimoney, formerly Superintendent of District 17, became the Superintendent of Anglophone District West on July 1, 2012. The superintendent's office is located in Fredericton and satellite district offices are in Oromocto and Woodstock.

== List of schools ==
=== High schools ===
- Central New Brunswick Academy
- Fredericton High School
- Harvey High School
- Leo Hayes High School
- McAdam High School
- Stanley Regional High School

=== Middle schools ===
- Bliss Carman Middle School
- Central New Brunswick Academy
- Devon Middle School
- George Street Middle School
- Nashwaaksis Middle School

=== Elementary schools ===
- Alexander Gibson Memorial School (Retired)
- Barkers Point School
- Connaught Street School
- Doaktown Primary School
- Douglas School
- Forest Hill School (Fredericton, New Brunswick)
- Garden Creek School
- Harvey Elementary School (Harvey, New Brunswick)
- Kingsclear Consolidated School
- Liverpool Street School
- McAdam Elementary School
- McAdam Avenue School
- Montgomery Street School (Fredericton, New Brunswick)
- Nashwaak Valley School
- Nashwaaksis Memorial School
- New Maryland Elementary School
- Park Street School
- Priestman Street Elementary School, K-5
- Royal Road School
- South Devon School
- Stanley Elementary School (New Brunswick)
- Upper Miramichi Elementary School

=== Combined elementary and middle schools ===
- Keswick Ridge School

=== Private schools ===
- Devon Park Christian School
- Montessori World Inc.

=== Other schools ===
- District 18 Education Centre
- Nova Learning Center
