= New Brunswick School District 01 =

Former school district in New Brunswick, Canada

School District 1

Location
- Dieppe, New Brunswick Moncton, Dieppe, Fredericton, Oromocto, Memramcook, Saint John Canada
- Coordinates: 46°05′52″N 64°44′14″W

District information
- Chair of the board: Gilles Bourque
- Director of education: Anne-Marie LeBlanc (Acting)
- Schools: 15

Students and staff
- Students: 13,000+ (2012-2013)

Other information
- Website: francophonesud.nbed.nb.ca

District scolaire 01 (or School District 01) was a Canadian school district in New Brunswick.

District 01 was a Francophone district operating 35 public schools (gr. K-12) in Albert, Westmorland, Saint John, Charlotte, Kings, Queens, Sunbury, and York counties until June 30, 2012.

Enrolment was approximately 13,000 students and 1,700 staff. District 01 is headquartered in Dieppe.

== List of schools ==
=== High schools ===
- École L'Odyssée (Moncton)
- École Mathieu-Martin (Dieppe)

=== Middle schools ===
- École Carrefour de l'Acadie (Dieppe)
- École Le Mascaret (Moncton)

=== Elementary schools ===
- École Amirault (Dieppe)
- École Anna Malenfant (Dieppe)
- École Champlain (Moncton)
- École des Bâtisseurs (Fredericton)
- École Sainte-Bernadette (Moncton)
- École Sainte-Thérèse (Dieppe)
- École Saint-Henri (Moncton)

=== Combined elementary and middle schools ===
- École Abbey-Landry (Memramcook)
- École Arc-en-ciel (Oromocto)

=== Other schools ===
- École Sainte-Anne (Fredericton)
- École Samuel-de-Champlain (Saint John)

== See also ==
- List of school districts in New Brunswick
