= École L'Odyssée =

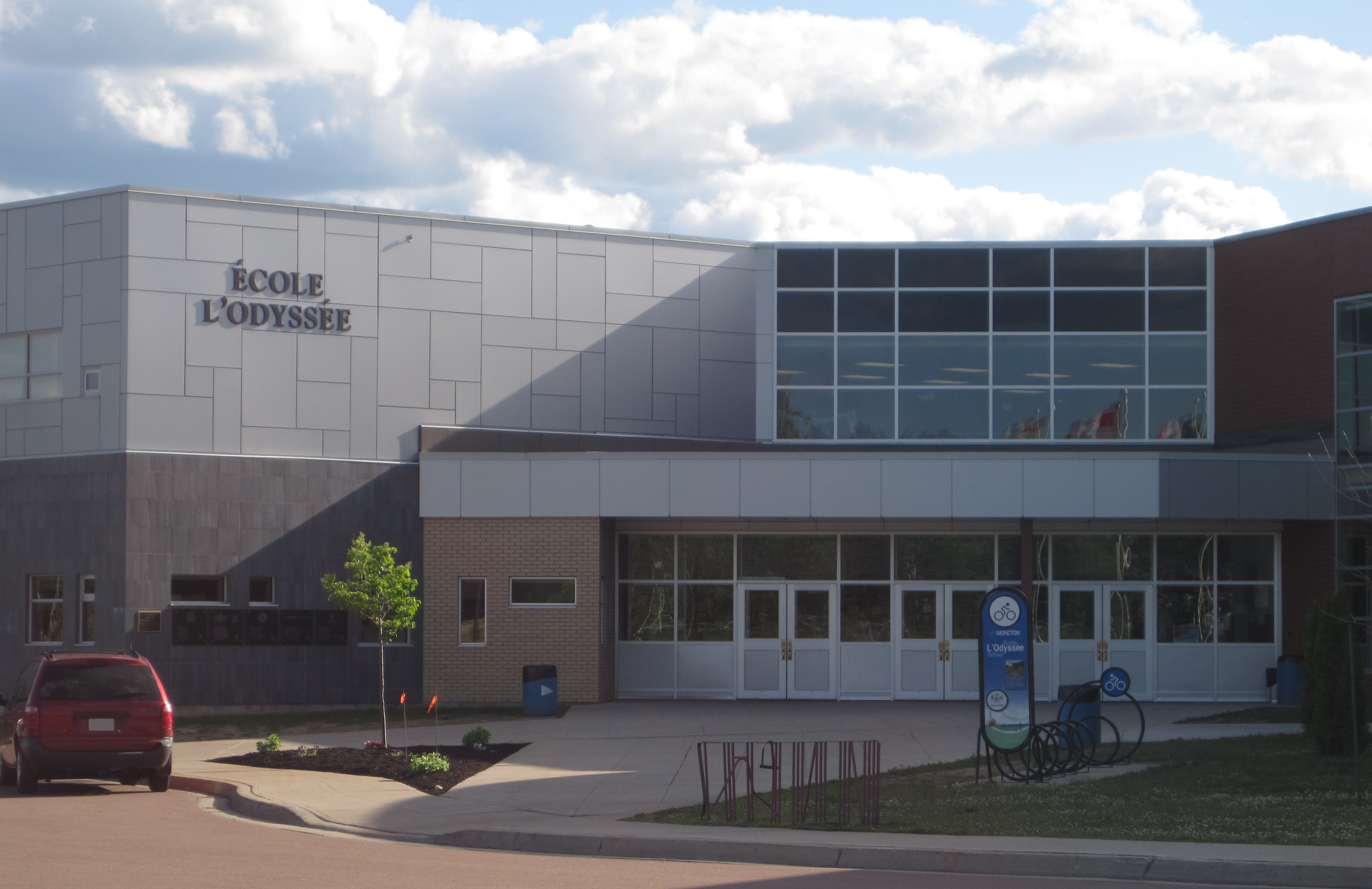

Location
- 60 Leopold F. Belliveau Dr. Moncton, New Brunswick, E1A 8V4; Canada; 46.11909°N 64.791269°W

Information
- School type: Public, High School
- Established: 30 September 2005; 20 years ago
- School district: Francophone Sud School District
- School number: 1360
- Principal: Karine Veilleux
- Staff: 52
- Grades: 9–12
- Enrollment: 1100 (September 8, 2022)
  - Grade 9: 300
  - Grade 10: 365
  - Grade 11: 180
  - Grade 12: 171
- Language: French
- Area: Moncton
- Campus type: Urban
- Colour: Blue Orange
- Mascot: Zeus
- Team name: Olympiens
- Endowment: $24.2 million
- Website: ecole.district1.nbed.nb.ca/ecole-odyssee/
- ^{‡}All statistics in this infobox (unless otherwise cited) are referenced with

École L'Odyssée (French pronunciation: [ekɔl lɔdiˈse], English: "Odyssey School") is a public francophone high school in Moncton, New Brunswick, Canada. It is part of the province's Francophone Sud School District, offering education to students from grade nine to twelve. The school opened in 2005 as part of a $24.2 million project, alongside the adjoining middle school, École Le Mascaret. École L'Odyssée was to alleviate overcrowding at École Mathieu-Martin in nearby Dieppe. This move allowed the Moncton Hospital to expand, while the Vanier establishment made way for medical offices.

It is the only French high school in Moncton.

== History ==
As Moncton's population grew over the years, overcrowding in high schools soon became a problem: in the 2004–05 school year, École Mathieu-Martin – the sole francophone high school in the area – had an enrolment of 1,609 students, well above the 2009–2010 enrolment of 1,025. When the city's growth rate climbed from 5% in the years 1991–96 to 6.5% in the years 2001–06, the problem became even more apparent. In fact, prior to construction, the idea of a second francophone complex had been in the minds of the New Brunswick Department of Education since as early as December 20, 2002. This idea was later confirmed in New Brunswick's record-breaking $809 million budget for the 2003–04 fiscal year, where $100,000 was allocated to "develop the educational specifications" of the complex. Originally, the project was code named "Moncton School Complex" (French: Complexe Scolaire de Moncton).

Premier at École L'Odyssée inauguration
A French excerpt of the speech by New Brunswick Premier Bernard Lord during École L'Odyssée's inauguration, demonstrating the implication of the government leading up to the ceremony

On January 12, 2004, the two schools were revealed to be attached side-to-side, occupying a combined area of 16,000 square meters (170,000 square feet) about 2.5 kilometres (1.6 miles) from the nearby Université de Moncton. When commenting on the new facility, New Brunswick Premier Bernard Lord said that "[this] project offers numerous advantages, from several points of view", and that "it reflects [the government's] commitment to equipping New Brunswick with a high-calibre education system." The names for the two schools were picked from submissions sent by the education councils of District 01 and District 03 on March 14, 2005. Both schools were announced to be replacing École Beauséjour and École Vanier, two francophone middle schools, which made way for the expansion of the Moncton Hospital and for medical offices, respectively.

A final $11.2 million was allocated on January 6, 2005, which was 23.3% of the $48 million Department of Education budget for that fiscal year. On July 15, 2005, the school was awarded a $60,000 federal fund for energy efficiency 39% below the national energy threshold; this would save the New Brunswick government $115,193 per year, or an eventual $2 million over 20 years. The school held its inauguration ceremony with Bernard Lord present on September 30, 2005. Lord spoke of his government's intention to add schools to the growing number of Francophone institutions in New Brunswick, as well as advancing the state of the province's education. "Today's inauguration represents an historic moment for Moncton's Francophone community," he said in his speech. "Parents, students and teaching staff now have modern, state of the art facilities. I feel very proud about this project and I am delighted that it is now a reality." On September 9, 2009, a new, $884,100 permit was awarded to extend L'Odyssée's total area by 390 m^{2} (4,200 sq ft) for the expansion of its new infirmary and orientation center.

The city went under scrutiny after the death on November 30, 2009 of Erica Frenette, a student at L'Odyssée, who was struck by a car after crossing an intersection near the school in poor weather conditions. Parents began petitions to install street lights near what they deemed to be a "dangerous [street corner]", and on May 4, 2010, the request was approved.

== Academics ==
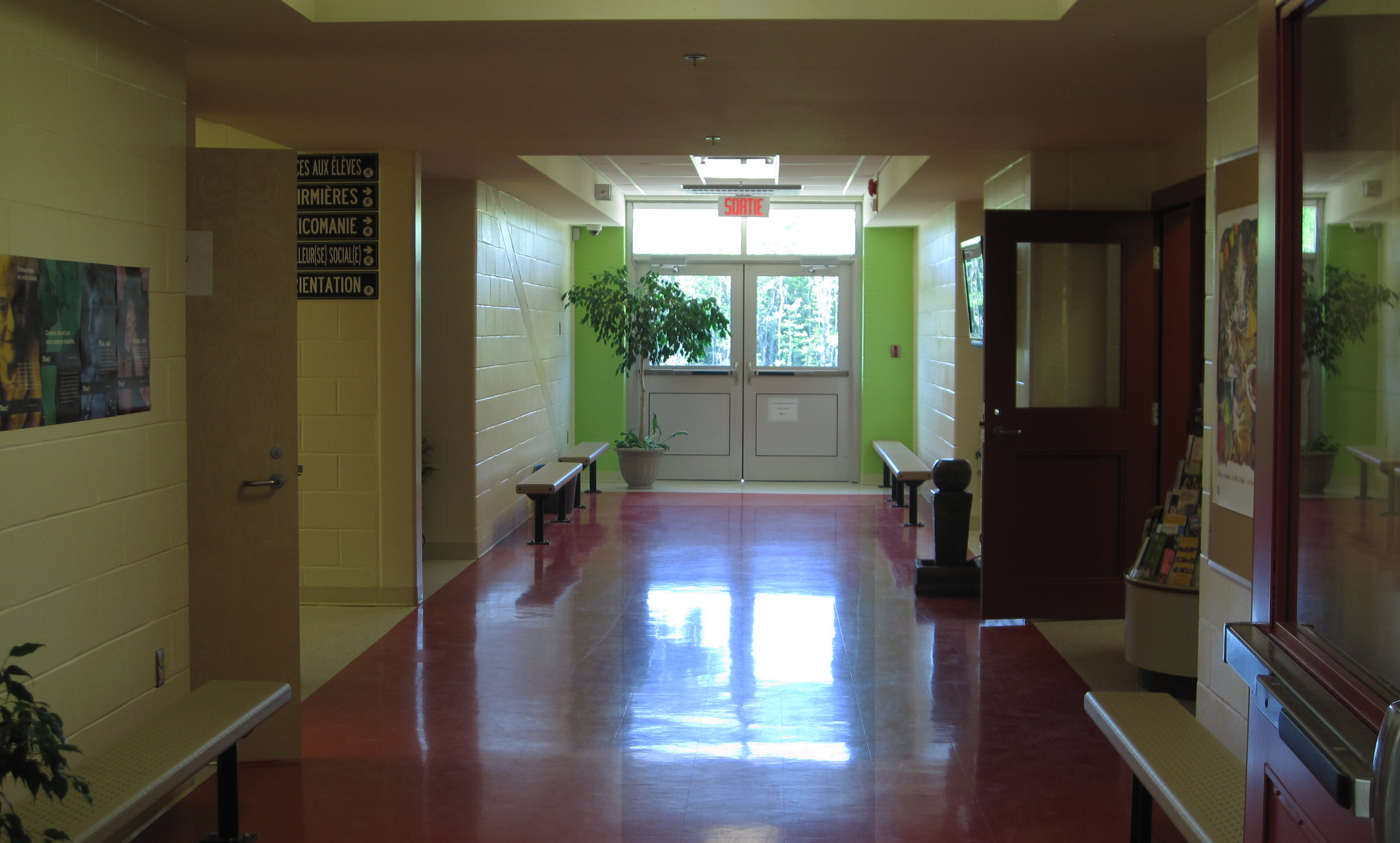
The entrance to the new $884,100 extension

=== Curriculum ===
The school's curriculum is based on a 30-credit system, requiring a student to receive all 17 mandatory credits and seven optional credits to graduate. Examples of notable courses are law, Esperanto, German, Auto mechanics, carpentry, entrepreneurship, world religions, cooperative education, and leadership. L'Odyssée also offers exclusive courses in work-life development and speaking Acadian.

A partnership with the Université de Moncton and CCNB Dieppe allows students to take and be credited for select courses off-campus one period per semester at no cost during their senior year. Additionally, Cisco offers a course in server and information sustainment, and the school offers access to ten online courses, including astronomy and world geography. Sports programs are available and credited, including hockey and soccer.

There are two curricular programs, called "Volets", for students wishing to graduate with honours in science and engineering or art and social sciences. (Note: Although the volet "Vie Saine et Active" is on the list of programs, it was removed in early 2009 due to lack of participation.) The main differences between the standard curriculum and the two "Volet" programs are the addition of mandatory courses in the domain of the chosen program, and the requirement to complete thirty hours of volunteer duty. A student must gain an average of 80% in the additional mandatory courses to graduate with honours.

=== Schedule ===
Schedule layout (as of June 21, 2019)
	Day 1	Day 2	Day 3	Day 4	Day 5	Wednesday
9:00–9:41	PAAQ	PAAQ	PAAQ	PAAQ	PAAQ	9:00–9:16
9:46–10:58	A	C	A	A	A	9:22–10:25
11:11–12:23	B	B	C	B	B	10:38–11:41
1:23–2:35	D	E	D	C	E	12:41–1:43
2:48–4:00	E	D	E	D	C	1:57–3:00

École L'Odyssée operates on a modified version of the controversial concept of block scheduling. Instead of the traditional seven- or eight-period school day, every day students attend four out of the five classes for that semester. The following semester, students attend their remaining five courses in the same fashion, totalling ten courses per year. School days are labelled 1 to 5, instead of Monday to Friday, with each "day" having a predetermined layout.

Wednesdays, regardless of the "day", are cut by one hour throughout the district to compensate for Community of Practice (French: Communauté d'apprentissage professionnelles, or "CAP") meetings between teachers at the end of the day, to "direct [the district's efforts] towards the educational success of students." Study hall (known as the "PAAQ" period, which stands for "Preoccupation de l'Affectif et de l'Apprentissage de Qualité") is reserved between the first and second period of the day, except for Wednesdays, where the period is removed to compensate for the CAP meetings.

Although the schedule is identical throughout the school, students must fill in their courses – A through E – as defined by their schedule:

Example schedule for a sophomore
First semester	Course	Second semester
Math	A	Math
Physical Education	B	Health Education
French	C	French
Science	D	World History
English	E	Biology

First semester
	Day 1	Day 2	Day 3	Day 4	Day 5	Wednesday
9:00–10:15	Math	Fr.	Math	Math	Math	9:00–10:08
10:20–10:45	PAAQ	PAAQ	PAAQ	PAAQ	PAAQ	No PAAQ
10:59–12:14	P.E.	P.E.	Fr.	P.E.	P.E.	10:22–11:30
1:16–2:31	Sc.	Eng.	Sc.	Fr.	Eng.	12:30–1:38
2:45–4:00	Eng.	Sc.	Eng.	Sc.	Fr.	1:52–3:00

Second semester
	Day 1	Day 2	Day 3	Day 4	Day 5	Wednesday
9:00–10:15	Math	Fr.	Math	Math	Math	9:00–10:08
10:20–10:45	PAAQ	PAAQ	PAAQ	PAAQ	PAAQ	No PAAQ
10:59–12:14	H.E.	H.E.	Fr.	H.E.	H.E.	10:22–11:30
1:16–2:31	Hist.	Bio.	Hist.	Fr.	Bio.	12:30–1:38
2:45–4:00	Bio.	Hist.	Bio.	Hist	Fr.	1:52–3:00

=== Rankings ===
Outside rankings for the school have been low compared to the district's average. In 2010, a report published by the Atlantic Institute for Market Studies put L'Odyssée at the bottom of the district's 22-school list overall (one school being unranked), based on data from 2005 to 2008.

Subject	Note	Rank
Post-Secondary Prep. Math	A−	3
Socio-Economic Status	–	4
Teacher Certification	–	5
Overall Math Mark	A−	6
Overall Engagement	B	8
Pupil-Teacher Ratio	–	10
Post-Secondary Achievement	F	21
Final Mark	C	21

In 2005, the province began including the school in their reports on student dropout rates. At the time, its rates were the highest in the province, with a total of six dropouts for every 100 students enrolled. In contrast, the district average was 0.9 dropouts per 100 enrolments, and the provincial average was 2.4 dropouts. The following year, the school's rate dropped to 5.4, remaining three percentage points above the provincial average. In 2007, it fell 2.2 points, down to 3.2 dropouts per 100 students, and finally settled at 2%, 0.2 percentage points below the provincial average of 2.2%.

In terms of academic performance, the province releases report cards based on yearly exams to track the progress toward a goal set for 2013. The exams are held for English classes in the tenth grade, for French classes in the eleventh grade, and for mathematics in the eleventh grade. The report card rates schools based on how many students pass each exam, instead of rating on the average mark on the exam. L'Odyssée, according to the report, is below both the district and the provincial success rate:

École L'Odyssée report card
	2008 rate	2009 rate	2010 rate	District rate	Provincial rate	Goals for 2013
English	95%	97%	94%	96%	67%	70%
French	72%	58%	58%	61%	56%	85%
Mathematics	60%	59%	53%	61%	46%	85%

== Athletics ==
L'Odyssée offers spots in nearly every NBIAA-organized sport. Players participating under the school's name are given the nickname "Olympien" (English: Olympian).

=== Hockey ===
The hockey teams, male and female, are required to practice every first period of the first semester in a credited course. Students participate in up to three tournaments before the provincials and over 30 games in total. The 2009–10 female team finished second in the provincial finals versus the Riverview Blackhawks.

=== Soccer ===
The school has four soccer teams: two juniors and two seniors. The male junior team placed first in the 2009 provincial championships.

=== Track and field ===
The track and field team at L'Odyssée has been the recipient of several provincial titles since 2006. Team members have included Geneviève Lalonde (7-time champion with six provincial records in the 800 m, 1,500 m, and 3,000 m from 2006 to 2009 and represented Canada at the 2010 World Junior Championships in Athletics), Jessica Chamberland (6-time champion with one provincial record in the shot put from 2006 to 2009), and Alexandre Coholan (2-time champion in the 100 m and 200 m, as well as a silver medal in the triple jump).

Asterisk (*) denotes NBIAA record holding score as of 2012.

Placement	Name	Event	Final	Year	Citation
1st place, gold medalist(s)	Naomi Bourgeois	Girls' 400 m Hurdles (17–18 yrs)	77.73	2010	
1st place, gold medalist(s)	Geneviève Lalonde	Girls' 400 m Dash (17–18 yrs)	59.10	2009	
1st place, gold medalist(s)	Geneviève Lalonde	Girls' 1,500 m Run (17–18 yrs)	4:36:13*	2009	
1st place, gold medalist(s)	Jessica Chamberland	Girls' Shot Put (17–18 yrs)	11.32 m*	2009	
1st place, gold medalist(s)	Jessica Chamberland	Girls' Discus Throw (17–18 yrs)	30.66 m	2009	
1st place, gold medalist(s)	Alexandre Coholan	Boys' 100 m Dash (15–16 yrs)	11.68	2009	
1st place, gold medalist(s)	Alexandre Coholan	Boys' 200 m Dash (15–16 yrs)	23.92	2009	
1st place, gold medalist(s)	Geneviève Lalonde	Girls' 800 m Dash (17–18 yrs)	2:13:90*	2008	
1st place, gold medalist(s)	Geneviève Lalonde	Girls' 3,000 m Run (17–18 yrs)	9:52:63*	2008	
1st place, gold medalist(s)	Jessica Chamberland	Girls' Shot Put (17–18 yrs)	10.59 m	2008	
1st place, gold medalist(s)	Jessica Chamberland	Girls' Discus Throw (17–18 yrs)	29.47m	2008	
1st place, gold medalist(s)	Geneviève Lalonde	Girls' 3,000 m Run (15–16 yrs)	10:04:18*	2007	
1st place, gold medalist(s)	Geneviève Lalonde	Girls' 800 m Dash (15–16 yrs)	2:17:68*	2007	
1st place, gold medalist(s)	Geneviève Lalonde	Girls' 1,500 m Run (15–16 yrs)	4:49:24*	2006	
1st place, gold medalist(s)	Jessica Chamberland	Girls' Shot Put (15–16 yrs)	9.50 m	2006	
1st place, gold medalist(s)	Jessica Chamberland	Girls' Discus Throw (15–16 yrs)	21.12 m	2006	
2nd place, silver medalist(s)	Alexandre Coholan	Boys' Triple Jump (17–18 yrs)	10.98 m	2010	
3rd place, bronze medalist(s)	Alexandre Coholan	Boys' 100 m Dash (17–18 yrs)	12.07	2010	
3rd place, bronze medalist(s)	Erika Ermen	Girls' Shot Put (17–18 yrs)	9.63 m	2010	
3rd place, bronze medalist(s)	Nikki LeBlanc	Girls' 3,000 m Run (15–16 yrs)	11:16:57	2006	

=== Other sports ===
L'Odyssée is home to a cross-country team, a softball and baseball team, two Basketball teams, a golf team, a football team, a swimming team, three curling teams, a badminton team, and a rugby union team. In 2010, the school's wrestling team featured a provincial winner in the girls' 60 kg class. The senior female volleyball team took the silver medal in the 2010 provincial tournament.

== Activities ==
=== Jazz / Harmony ===
The Jazz and Harmony teams, led by instructor Martin McLaughlin (previously Charles Arsenau), act as a side project for the school's existing music course and has participated in every yearly Heritage Festival since 2005. The team won a competition in New York in 2009 and six Maestro awards, including the "Outstanding Band Award", and "Best Solo". The following year, the team placed second and garnered one Maestro award in Washington.

=== Improvisation ===
L'Odyssée participated in the regional Improvisation competitions in the 2009–10 season. The team also participated in the "Gougoune Dorée 2010" competition, a provincial tournament, and took first place. Sebastien Richard earned the "Most Starred Player" award, while captain Julie Frigault won MVP.

=== Debate club ===
The school was among the first to participate in the debut of the provincial debate championship in Caraquet. The team of three received the gold prize on March 22, 2010 against École Mathieu-Martin in the finals.

== See also ==
- École Le Mascaret
- École Mathieu-Martin
- Francophone Sud School District – School district in New Brunswick, Canada
- List of schools in New Brunswick
