= Doaktown Consolidated High School =

Location
- 430 Main St; Doaktown, New Brunswick, E9C 1E8; Canada
- Coordinates: 46.556957°N 66.125414°W

Information
- School type: Middle and High school
- School board: Anglophone West School District
- Principal: Barbara Long
- Grades: 4-12
- Enrollment: 152 (2012)
- Language: English
- Website: doaktownhs.nbed.nb.ca

Doaktown Consolidated High School is located in Northumberland County, New Brunswick. Doaktown Consolidated High School is in the Anglophone West School District. The school now known as the Doaktown Elementary School, still contains the Doaktown Public Library as well as the gymnasium. The old elementary school building has been condemned for many years. The largest graduating class at the school was in 2000 with a student total of 40 and 2020 marks their 20th graduation anniversary.

== See also ==
- List of schools in New Brunswick
- Anglophone West School District
