= New Brunswick School District 17 =

Defunct school district

School District 17 is a defunct Canadian school district in New Brunswick. It was an Anglophone district operating 18 public schools (gr. K-12) in Queens and Sunbury counties. Enrollment was approximately 6,000 students and 580 teachers. District 17 was headquartered in Oromocto. In 2012 it was amalgamated into Anglophone West School District.

== List of schools ==
=== High schools ===
- Chipman Forest Avenue School
- Minto Memorial High School
- Oromocto High School

=== Middle schools ===
- Harold Peterson Middle School
- Ridgeview Middle School (Oromocto, New Brunswick)

=== Elementary schools ===
- Assiniboine Avenue Elementary School
- Burton Elementary School (New Brunswick)
- Chipman Elementary School
- Geary Elementary School
- Gesner Street Elementary School
- Hubbard Avenue Elementary School
- Lower Lincoln Elementary School
- Summerhill Street Elementary School

=== Combined elementary and middle schools ===
- Coles Island School
- Gagetown School
- Minto Elementary-Middle School
- Sunbury West School

=== Private schools ===
- Hoyt Christian School

=== Other schools ===
- Cambridge-Narrows School
