= Carlingford, New Brunswick =

Community in New Brunswick, Canada

Coordinates: 46°44′50.5″N 67°44′47″W

Carlingford is a Canadian rural community in Victoria County, New Brunswick, on the Canada–United States border between Maine and New Brunswick. Carlingford is midway between Perth-Andover and Fort Fairfield on Route 190, also known as the Fort Road, which ends at the Canada Border Services Agency inspection station.

A farming community, Carlingford's economy relies heavily on potatoes.

An Anglophone community, Carlingford students attend classes in Perth-Andover under School District 14. The schools are Southern Victoria High School, Perth Andover Middle School, and Andover Elementary School.

== History ==
The area was named after John Carling.

== See also ==
- List of communities in New Brunswick
