= MMHS =

MMHS can refer to several things:

- Machias Memorial High School
- Manchester Memorial High School
- Maple Mountain High School (Utah)
- Mamdee Mollah High School
- Mardela Middle and High School
- Matthew Moss High School
- Morton Memorial Schools, at the Indiana Soldiers' and Sailors' Children's Home
- Mount Miguel High School
- Military Message Handling System
- Milliken Mills High School
- Minto Memorial High School
- Mira Mesa Senior High School
- Mundy's Mill High School
- Murdock Middle/High School
- Murrieta Mesa High School
