= LHHS =

LHHS may refer to any of the following high schools:

- Lyman Hall High School, located in Wallingford, Connecticut
- Laguna Hills High School, located in Laguna Hills, California
- La Habra High School, located in La Habra, California
- Lake Highlands High School, located in Dallas, Texas
- Lake Howell High School, located in Winter Park, Florida
- Leo Hayes High School, located in Fredericton, New Brunswick
- Lake Havasu High School, located in Lake Havasu, Arizona
- Licking Heights High School, located in Pataskala, Ohio
- Liberty Hill High School, located in Liberty Hill, Texas
- Lake Hamilton High School, located in Pearcy, Arkansas
