= New Brunswick School District 03 =

School district in New Brunswick, Canada

District scolaire 03 (or School District 03) is a Canadian school district in New Brunswick.

District 03 is a Francophone district operating 21 public schools (gr. K-12) in Carleton, Victoria, Madawaska and Restigouche counties.

Current enrollment is approximately 7,000 students and 470 teachers. District 03 is headquartered in Edmundston.

== List of schools ==
=== High schools ===
- Polyvalente A.-J.-Savoie
- Cité des Jeunes A.-M.-Sormany
- École Marie-Gaétane
- École Mgr-Matthieu-Mazerolle
- Polyvalente Thomas-Albert

=== Elementary schools ===
- École Marie-Immaculée
- École Mgr-Martin
- Mgr-Lang
- Élémentaire Sacré-Coeur
- Régionale-de-Saint-André

=== Combined elementary and middle schools ===
- Carrefour de la Jeunesse
- Centre d'apprentissage du Haut-Madawaska
- École Echo Jeunesse
- École Ernest-Lang
- École Notre-Dame
- Régionale Saint-Basile
- École Sainte-Anne (Sainte-Anne-de-Madawaska)
- École Saint-Jacques
- École Saint-Joseph

=== Other schools ===
- Classe alternative (Cité des Jeunes)
- Classe alternative (Polyvalente Thomas-Albert)
- École Grande-Rivière
