= Ridgeview Middle School =

Ridgeview Middle School may refer to:

In the United States

- Ridgeview Middle School (Texas), in Round Rock, Texas
- Ridgeview Middle School (Maryland), in Gaithersburg, Maryland
- Ridgeview Middle School (Georgia), in Sandy Springs, Georgia
- Ridgeview Middle School (Ohio), in Columbus Ohio

In Canada

- Ridgeview Middle School (New Brunswick), in Oromocto, New Brunswick
