= New Brunswick School District 11 =

School district in New Brunswick, Canada

District scolaire 11 (or School District 11) was a Canadian school district in New Brunswick until June 2012.

District 11 was a Francophone district operating 21 public schools (gr. K-12) in Northumberland, Kent and Westmorland counties.

As of June 2012, enrollment is approximately 6,100 students and 440 teachers. District 05 is headquartered in Richibucto. New Brunswick School District 11 is now part of Francophone Sud School District.

== List of schools ==
=== High schools ===
- Assomption
- Clément-Cormier
- Louis-J.-Robichaud
- Mgr-Marcel-François-Richard

=== Combined elementary and middle schools ===
- Blanche-Bourgeois
- Calixte-F.-Savoie
- Camille-Vautour
- Donat-Robichaud
- Dr-Marguerite-Michaud
- Grande-Digue
- Marée Montante
- Mgr-François-Bourgeois
- Mont Carmel
- Notre-Dame
- Père-Edgar-T.-LeBlanc
- Saint-Paul
- Soleil Levant

=== Elementary schools ===
- W.-F.-Boisvert

=== Other schools ===
- Baie-Sainte-Anne
- Carrefour Beausoleil
