= École Carrefour de l'Acadie =

Location
- 515 Champlain St. Dieppe, New Brunswick, E1A 1P2; Canada; 46.0560°N 64.4404°W

Information
- School type: Junior high
- Founded: 2006
- School board: Francophone Sud
- Principal: Lisa Brun
- Grades: 6-8
- Enrollment: 360
- Language: French
- Area: Dieppe and surrounding district
- Colours: Blue , red and yellow
- Website: carrefourdelacadie.nbed.nb.ca

École Carrefour de l'Acadie is a Francophone middle school located in Dieppe, New Brunswick, Canada, with an enrollment of up to 360.

== History ==
École Carrefour de l'Acadie was officially opened on December 4, 2006. Built at a cost of $5 million, the school planned to house 580 students in grades 6 to 8.

The school was set up in vacant space at École Mathieu-Martin. The project involved the construction of a gymnasium, development of a cafeteria, and the renovation of 30 classrooms and specialized premises with its own entrance. The middle school enabled School District 01 to relocate a portion of its student population in order to reduce the overpopulation at the Anna Malenfant and Amirault schools in Dieppe.

== See also ==
- Francophone Sud School District
- List of schools in New Brunswick
