= New Brunswick School District 09 =

Canadian school district

District scolaire 09 (or School District 09) is a Canadian school district in New Brunswick.

District 09 is a Francophone district operating 22 public schools (gr. K-12) in Gloucester County, exclusively in the Acadian Peninsula region.

Current enrollment is approximately 7,400 students and 500 teachers. District 09 is headquartered in Tracadie-Sheila.

== List of schools ==
=== High schools ===
- Louis-Mailloux
- Marie-Esther
- W.-Arthur-Losier

=== Middle schools ===
- Le Tremplin
- Léandre-LeGresley

=== Elementary schools ===
- La Ruche
- Le Maillon

=== Combined elementary and middle schools ===
- La Passerelle
- La Relève-de-Saint-Isidore
- La Source
- La Villa-des-Amis
- L'Amitié
- La-Rivière
- L'Envolée
- L'Escale-des-Jeunes
- L'Étincelle
- Marguerite-Bourgeoys
- Ola-Léger
- René-Chouinard
- Soeur-Saint-Alexandre
- Terre-des-Jeunes

=== Other schools ===
- La Fontaine
- PHARE Caraquet
- PHARE Néguac
- PHARE Shippagan
- PHARE Tracadie-Sheila
