= Hartland High School =

Hartland High School can refer to:

- Hartland High School (Michigan), in Hartland Township, Michigan, United States
- Hartland High School (New Brunswick), in Hartland, New Brunswick, Canada
- Hartland High School (Reading), in Reading, England, United Kingdom
