= Canterbury High School (New Brunswick) =

Location
- 80 Main Street; Lakeland Ridges, New Brunswick, E6H 1L3; Canada
- Coordinates: 45.89495°N 67.461437°W

Information
- School type: K-12 school
- Founded: 1951
- School board: Anglophone West School District
- School number: 2803
- Principal: Susan Mabie
- Grades: K-12
- Language: English
- Website: chs.nbed.ca

Canterbury High School is a K-12 school located in Canterbury (now part of Lakeland Ridges), New Brunswick. Canterbury High School is in the Anglophone West School District, and was in the former provincial School District 12.

Construction work on the school, then-named the Canterbury Regional High School, began in 1950. The school was provincially notable for its badminton team, which was featured in a CBC News article in 2019.

== Notable alumni ==
- Dave Durepos, former wheelchair basketball player

== See also ==
- List of schools in New Brunswick
- Anglophone West School District
