= Grande-Digue, New Brunswick =

Grande-Digue
- Location of Grande-Digue in New Brunswick
- Coordinates: 46°16′25.34″N 64°34′32.69″W
- Country: Canada
- Province: New Brunswick
- County: Kent County
- Settled: 1767

Government
  - MP: Dominic LeBlanc (L)
  - Provincial Representative: Vacant

Area
  - Land: 46.04 km^{2} (17.78 sq mi)
- Lowest elevation: 0 m (0 ft)

Population (2011)
  - Total: 2,182
  - Density: 47.4/km^{2} (123/sq mi)
- Time zone: UTC-4 (Atlantic (AST))
  - Summer (DST): UTC-3 (ADT)
- Website: http://www.grande-digue.net/

Grande-Digue (2011 pop.: 2,182) is a community in Kent County, New Brunswick, Canada, near Shediac.

The former local service district of Grande-Digue took its name from the community.

== Geography ==
The community is located in Dundas Parish, on the north-east shoreline of the Shediac Bay. Grand-Digue is located around the intersection of Grand Digue Rd and Route 530.

== History ==
Following the expulsion of the Acadians in 1755, many Acadians found refuge in Grande-Digue. They did not receive land grants until 1791.

The community is predominantly Acadian, and Acadian French is the most widely spoken language. However, due to the large number of summer tourists and cottagers, English is also spoken by virtually the entire population.

École Grande-Digue is the only school located in Grande-Digue. It is a K-8 school and is part of School District 11. High school students go to Polyvalente Louis-J.-Robichaud in Shediac.

== Demographics ==
In the 2021 Census of Population conducted by Statistics Canada, Grande-Digue had a population of 2,596 living in 1,185 of its 1,774 total private dwellings, a change of 14.8% from its 2016 population of 2,261. With a land area of 46.23 km^{2} (17.85 sq mi), it had a population density of 56.2/km^{2} (145.4/sq mi) in 2021.

== Notable people ==
- Joël Bourgeois, 3000m steeplechase runner, 2-time competitor at the Olympic Games and gold medalist at the 1999 Pan American Games.

== See also ==
- List of communities in New Brunswick
- Greater Shediac
