= Sussex Regional High School =

Location
- 55 Leonard Drive; Sussex, New Brunswick, E4E 2P8; Canada
- Coordinates: 45.72523°N 65.49221°W

Information
- Other name: SRHS
- Type: Public high school
- Motto: Latin: Vincit qui se vincit (He who conquers first must conquer himself)
- Established: 1972
- School district: Anglophone South School District
- Principal: Jillian Jamieson
- Grades: 9–12
- Enrollment: 753 (2025)
- Colours: Black and Red
- Mascot: Sonics
- Website: sussexhigh.nbed.nb.ca

Sussex Regional High School (SRHS) is a public high school in Sussex, New Brunswick, Canada. It teaches in English and French immersion.

== History ==
First opened at its current location in 1979, Sussex Regional High School serves families from as far away as Coles Island, Bloomfield, Anagance, and Jeffries Corner. Like the community of Sussex, a small municipality of less than five thousand which draws on a surrounding population of more than thirty thousand, Sussex Regional High represents a wide variety of backgrounds, interests, and abilities.

== Programs ==
SRHS offers a range of programs ranging from French immersion, to academic courses in English, math, and the sciences, to practical courses in drafting, automotive, electrical, culinary technology, and carpentry, as well as various elective courses.

== Extracurricular activities ==
SRHS students may participate in extracurricular activities including varsity and junior varsity men's and women's hockey, volleyball, basketball, curling, golf, and rugby. Women's softball and field hockey and men's baseball, football and co-ed track and field are also offered along with a wide variety of clubs, societies and committees. Some popular activities are yearbook, spirit club, international relations club, minor officials, green club, chess club, dance committee, safe grad, jazz band, leadership, best buddies, Key Club, Rotary, and future education.

The school also has an active and engaging drama and theatre club who throughout the years have collected numerous awards from the New Brunswick Drama Festival and many awards won for their improv team.

== Sports ==
SRHS offers sports teams for all seasons. In late summer there are golf, softball and baseball. In fall there are soccer, field hockey, football, volleyball, rugby, track & field and cross country. Winter brings basketball and hockey. There are junior varsity and varsity teams for both men and women, depending on the numbers.

== Notable alumni ==
- Frank McKenna, former Premier of New Brunswick (1987–1997)
- Christian Meier, cyclist
