= Harvey High School (New Brunswick) =

Location
- 2055 Route 3 Harvey Station, New Brunswick, E6K 2P4; Canada
- Coordinates: 45.720163°N 67.008044°W

Information
- School type: Middle & High school
- Mottoes: To Wisdom We Climb
- Opened: January 1947
- School board: Anglophone West School District
- Principal: Jeremy MacIver
- Teaching staff: 18.8
- Grades: 6-12
- Enrollment: 222 (2022-23)
- Language: English And French
- Colours: Green and gold
- Team name: Harvey Lakers
- Website: harveyhighschool.nbed.nb.ca

Harvey High School is a grades 6-12 school located in Harvey, New Brunswick. Harvey High School is in the Anglophone West School District. The current principal is Jeremy MacIver.

== History ==
Before 1946, high-school level students in the area attended McAdam High School. Harvey Regional High School was opened in January 1947, accommodating students from grades 7–11. Eventually, the school was renamed to Harvey High School.

== See also ==
- List of schools in New Brunswick
- Anglophone West School District
