= Belleisle Regional High School =

Location
- 1800 Route 124; Springfield, New Brunswick, E5T 2K2; Canada
- Coordinates: 45.670834°N 65.832653°W

Information
- School type: Middle and High school
- School board: Anglophone South School District
- School number: 1945
- Principal: Jennifer McFadden
- Vice principal: Julia Mawer
- Grades: 6-12
- Enrollment: 350 (September 2017)
- Language: English & French Immersion
- Website: web1.nbed.nb.ca/sites/ASD-S/1945

Belleisle Regional High School is a combined Middle school and High school located in Kings County, New Brunswick. Belleisle Regional High School is in the Anglophone South School District.

== See also ==
- List of schools in New Brunswick
- Anglophone South School District
