= École Le Mascaret =

Location
- 610 McLaughlin Drive. Moncton, New Brunswick, E1A 4R6; Canada; 46.119343°N 64.791400°W

Information
- School type: Public, coeducational middle school
- Founded: September 30, 2005
- School district: Francophone Sud School District
- Superintendent: Anne-Marie LeBlanc
- Principal: Serge Boucher
- Staff: 60
- Grades: 6-8
- Enrollment: 398 (as of 2020)
- Language: French
- Area: Moncton East
- Colours: Green , Maroon , and Blue
- Website: ecole.district1.nbed.nb.ca/ecole-le-mascaret/

École Le Mascaret (French for Le Mascaret School) is a middle school located in Eastern Moncton. Le Mascaret no longer shares the same building as École L'Odyssée, a public francophone high school. Le Mascaret accommodates 575 students from grades 6 to 8. The new complex replaced the old Vanier and Beauséjour schools, which were shut down in 2005.

Le Mascaret was anticipated to move locations in 2021 to offer more space from the overpopulated school École L'Odyssée. "Building a new school will also ease pressure on the Francophone South School District, which includes École Le Mascaret and École L’Odyssée," according to the education minister. In 2022, the elementary school in the new educational complex was renamed in honor of Claudette Bradshaw, the late MP who was an advocate for education policy.

== See also ==
- Francophone Sud School District
- List of schools in New Brunswick
