= Deer Island Community School =

School in New Brunswick, Canada

Location
- 711 Route 772; Fairhaven, Deer Island, New Brunswick, New Brunswick; Canada; 44.9791°N 66.9849°W

Information
- School type: Elementary, Middle
- School board: Anglophone South School District
- Enrollment: 15-92 students, 2001; 100 students, 2009; 43 students, 2025; 39-41 students, 2026
- Language: English
- Website: Official website

Deer Island Community School (DICS) is located on Deer Island in the Bay of Fundy, Charlotte County, New Brunswick. Built in 1986 with a capacity for 128 students, it is in the Anglophone South School District. It was the first community school built in the province.

== Historical context ==
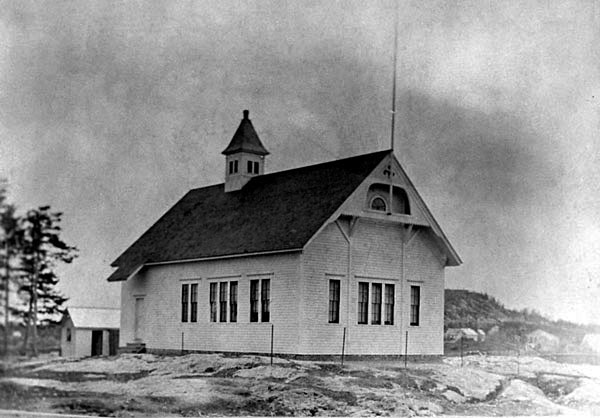
Lords Cove School #5, 1930

Historically, there were multiple schools serving the children of Deer Island.

West Isles Parish had 8 schools in 1892, this included eight schools numbered: #1, Indian Island, #2 Chocolate Cove (under Miss Daggett, repeatedly named as the highest performing), #3 Leonardville, #4 Richardsonville, #5 Lords Cove, #5½ Lambert Town (under Miss AnnieSimpson), #6 Lambert's Cove, 6½ and 7 Fairhaven (which housed a library), #8 Beans Island.

In March 1970, the District 21 School Board unanimously voted to close the Deer Island Regional High School, thus requiring students to bus to the mainland - though island residents unsuccessfully promised to reverse the closure. In 1976, rumors began that younger grades would also be shifted to the mainland, and a "Deer Island School Re-Establishment Committee" was unsuccessfully formed to bring back Grades 10-12 to the island.

== History of DICS ==
Built in 1986 at a cost of $1.5 million ($4.5 million in 2026) to accommodate 128 students, the 1987 opening was marred by delays in contract-signing as the school district was concerned that the Deer Island Recreation Council would be using the gymnasium twice as often as the school did, and it sought assurances of reimbursement for wear and tear on the equipment. Ultimately they considered sending a delegate to the Charles Stewart Mott Foundation in Flint, Michigan to determine how a "community school" was meant to handle such matters. Ultimately it was decided the Deer Island Recreation Council would use the facilities at no cost, but would pay for cleaning, outdoor upgrades, security gates and similar.

A 1986 grant from the Department of Municipal Affairs also saw the construction of tennis courts for the school. As of 1991, it also taught Grade 9.

In 2008, a 33-year old teacher from the mainland who had taught at DICS for four years was arrested and pleaded guilty to sexually luring as many as 25 children online across the continent.

In 2016 the province scrapped plans to move Grades 6, 7 and 8 to the mainland following opposition from islanders. In 2026, it was named as one of the schools facing potential closure under budget constraints.

== See also ==
- List of schools in New Brunswick
- Anglophone South School District
