= Hampton High School (New Brunswick) =

Location
- 34 Elizabeth Avenue; Hampton, Kings, New Brunswick, E5N 8H1; Canada; 45°31′01″N 65°50′15″W

Information
- Type: Public
- Motto: Unitas Perseverantia Laurus (Unity, Perseverance, Success)
- Established: 1992
- School district: Anglophone South School District (ASD-S)
- School number: 1947
- Principal: Amber Lenihan Lingley
- Vice Principal: Heather Porter, Colleen Flowers
- Athletic Director: Alex Richard
- Teaching staff: 37.8 (2022-2023)
- Grades: 9-12
- Enrollment: 650 (2022-2023)
- Language: English, French
- Colours: Silver, Black and White
- Mascot: Frostbite
- Team name: The Huskies
- Website: www.hamptonhigh.ca

Hampton High School is a public secondary school located in Hampton, New Brunswick, Canada. A part of the Anglophone South School District, the school serves students from grades 9 through 12. The school is home to the Hampton Huskies.

== History ==
=== Early development ===
In August 1992, Hampton High School's official school colours were chosen as black, silver and white, much to the dismay of the alumni of the former Hampton Consolidated School, whose school colours were green and white.

=== Opening of the school ===
Hampton High School opened its doors on September 8, 1992, to around 640 students. The school was established to alleviate the overcrowding at Kennebecasis Valley High School, which at the time enrolled over 1,900 students.

Hampton High initially housed grades 10–12. In August 1996, grade 9 was moved from Hampton Junior High School. In August 1997, grade 9 students from Macdonald Consolidated School moved in and four additional classrooms were added.

== School campus ==
Hampton High School's campus includes multiple courses taught by approximately 30 teachers in 2022–23. The exterior of the school has a baseball/softball field, soccer field with a small, 400-metre track, tennis courts, a skateboard park, an outdoor basketball court, and a trail that leads to the town's Spooner Island.

== Athletics ==
=== NBIAA teams ===
The school's team name is the Hampton Huskies, and their mascot is Frostbite.

Hampton High School has many teams that participate in the New Brunswick Interscholastic Athletic Association (NBIAA). In the 2022–2023 year, the school has many teams in many sports in many NBIAA divisions. The sports they have to offer are hockey (girls division only), baseball, Canadian football, soccer, cross country running, basketball, badminton, volleyball, rugby, and track and field. The school has won many NBIAA titles in the past. The school is in the Southern Conference in the AA division in the NBIAA.

NBIAA championships since 2023
Sport	Position	Division	Sr/Jr	Boys/Girls	Year
Baseball		AA			2023
Cross country		AAA	Junior	Boys	2023
Soccer		AA	Senior	Boys	2023
Soccer		AA	Senior	Girls	2023
Basketball		AA	Junior	Boys	2023

=== 2024 Football Season ===
Hampton High's Football season was one of the best the team has had in years. The team had a regular season record of 1-5, clinching a spot in the playoffs, ending an 8 year playoff drought. Team awards given out at the end of the year included: Most Valuable Player Award (Jordan Harley LB/WR), Offensive MVP (Eric St. Coeur RB) Defensive MVP (Matthew Beaman DE/LB), Rookie of the Year (Liam Hamilton OT/DT), and Team Leadership (Grant St. Coeur DT)

=== Mascot ===
Hampton High's mascot is Frostbite. The mascot was formally called the Hampton Husky, however.

== Enrollment by grade ==
=== Hampton High School enrollment ===
2022–23
Grade	Students
9	154
10	139
11	144
12	160
Total	599

=== Other Hampton Schools enrollment ===
Primary schools:

Dr. AT Leatherbarrow Primary School
Grade	Students
Kindergarten	73
1	68
2	94
Total	235

Hampton Elementary School
Grade	Students	Difference (vs DRATLPS)
3	94	
4	94	
5	96	
Total	284	+49

Hampton Middle School
Grade	Students	Difference (vs HHS)
6	129	
7	109	
8	131	
Total	369	−230
