= Central New Brunswick Academy =

CNBA

Location
- 7263 Route 8 New Bandon, New Brunswick, E9C 2A7; Canada; 46.4981°N 66.2930°W

Information
- School type: Middle & High School
- Founded: September 2010
- School board: Anglophone West
- School number: 0910
- Principal: Barbara Long
- Vice principal: Darren Ferdinand
- Grades: 6-12
- Enrollment: 300
- Language: English
- Website: cnba.nbed.nb.ca

Central New Brunswick Academy is a middle and secondary school located in New Bandon, New Brunswick, Canada. The school opened in September 2010.

Central educates around 300 students in grades 6–12. The principal is currently Barbara Long.

== Educational organization ==
The school is managed by the Anglophone West School District. The two feeder schools are Doaktown Consolidated School and Upper Miramichi Elementary School.

== History ==
=== Upper Miramichi Regional High School and Doaktown Consolidated High School Closure ===
These schools were closed and students were transferred to this school.

== See also ==
- List of schools in New Brunswick
