= Saint Mary's Academy (New Brunswick) =

Location
- 52 Marmen Avenue; Edmundston, New Brunswick, E3V 2H2; Canada; 47.36577°N 68.345151°W

Information
- School type: Elementary, Middle & High school
- School board: Anglophone West School District
- Principal: Julie Michaud
- Vice Principal: Bethany Toner
- Grades: K-12
- Language: English
- Website: https://sma.nbed.ca

Saint Mary's Academy is a K-12 school located in Madawaska County, New Brunswick. Saint Mary's Academy is in the Anglophone West School District.

== See also ==
- List of schools in New Brunswick
- Anglophone West School District
