= Cambridge-Narrows Community School =

Location
- 2158 Lakeview Road; Arcadia, New Brunswick, E4C 1N8; Canada
- Coordinates: 45.878437°N 66.010507°W

Information
- School type: Combined Elementary, Middle and High school
- School board: Anglophone West School District
- School number: 2412
- Principal: Heather Touchie Blakely
- Vice principal: Morgan Levesque
- Grades: K-12
- Language: English
- Colors: Red, Grey, White
- Website: cns.nbed.nb.ca/index.htm

Cambridge-Narrows Community School is a K-12 school located in Queens County, New Brunswick, on the south bank of the Washademoak Lake in the village of Arcadia. Cambridge-Narrows Community School is in the Anglophone West School District.

Cambridge-Narrows Community School also services the neighbouring communities of Codys, Jemseg, Whites Cove, Mill Cove and Waterborough.

== See also ==
- List of schools in New Brunswick
- Anglophone West School District
