= Cité des Jeunes A.-M.-Sormany =

Cité des Jeunes A.-M.-Sormany (CDJ)

Location
- 300 Martin Rd. Edmundston, New Brunswick, E3V 3K8; Canada; 47.370703°N 68.310041°W

Information
- School type: High School
- Motto: Diplôme en main, prêt pour demain (2007) (Diploma in hand, ready for tomorrow)
- Founded: 1972
- School board: Francophone Nord-Ouest School District
- Superintendent: Mr. Luc Caron
- Principal: Mr. Bertin Lang
- Grades: 9-12
- Enrollment: ± 1300
- Language: Canadian French, English Second-Language
- Area: Madawaska County
- Colours: Red , blue , and yellow
- Mascot: Cidji
- Team name: Républicain(e)
- Website: cdj.nbed.nb.ca/toweb/topic/index.html

La Cité des Jeunes A.-M.-Sormany is a Francophone high school in Edmundston, New Brunswick, Canada. It was named after Albert Sormany.

== Attendance ==
La Cité des Jeunes A.-M.-Sormany has over a thousand students attending. According to the 2006-2007 student census, precisely 1349 students attend this institution. Grade 9, 10, 11 and 12 are admitted including handicapped students.

== Curriculum ==
The standard curriculum of the institution is divided in the following departments:

- Arts (Music and visual arts) and Language (French, English and Spanish)
- Mathematics and Science (Biology, Chemistry and Physics)
- Home Economics
- Human Sciences
- Physical Education
- Technology

Its optional classes curriculum is one of the most varied in the province of New Brunswick with optional classes available in all aforementioned subjects. This includes such subjects as drama, sewing, dance and astronomy.

== "La Chaîne Humaine" ==
La Cité des Jeunes A.-M.-Sormany is renowned for its annual community food and fund raising for the local food bank ("R.A.D.O.") in Edmundston. The students gather over a hundred thousand food items (as well as other household items) every year. This event is organised by the school's humanitarian committee operated by teachers and students.

Photograph of the "Chaîne Humaine" (Human Chain) taken in Edmundston in November 2006. The picture shows students lined up in a chain where they pass non-perishable foodstuffs from one side of the bridge to another. It also shows the local food bank and homeless shelter in the background.

== Mascot ==
The high school has a school mascot named Cidji.

Cidji, the school mascot.

The name was coined by a student during a name-the-mascot contest.

== See also ==
- List of schools in New Brunswick
- Edmundston
- Madawaska County
