= École Sainte-Anne =

French-language school in New Brunswick, Canada

Coordinates: 45.9416933228412°N 66.65303307071417°W

- Fredericton, New Brunswick; Canada

Information
- Former name: École bilingue primaire de Fredericton
- Established: 1965; 61 years ago
- Grades: 6-12
- Enrollment: c. 1,300 (2014-2015)
- Language: French
- Website: esa.nbed.nb.ca

École Sainte-Anne or E.S.A. is an entirely French-language grade 6–12 school in Fredericton, New Brunswick, Canada. The school is located in the Centre Communautaire Sainte-Anne.

== History ==
In the late 1950s, a group called Cercle Français was created by the young French families that were arriving in the Fredericton area to work for the government. This group began asking the English school district to open French classes at one of the schools in the area when they realised they were in need of a place to send their children to receive an education. After having their idea rejected multiple times, the French group decided to embark on a new adventure and try to open their own French public school.

In 1965, they opened École bilingue primaire de Fredericton, which later became École Sainte-Anne, in an old Knights of Columbus building. The school began with 22 students in first and second grade. In a community that was mostly English, it was not easier for the students and their professors. On a daily basis, members of the English community would scream insults at them when they would enter and exit the building.

After a few more years of arguing with the English school district, the French community final got an official public school thanks to the New Brunswick premier at the time, Louis J. Robichaud. That same year, the school then moved to a condemned military barrack from World War II and obtained a total of 72 students.

In 1971, the school moved once more to the building that is now known as the Montgomery Street School with a total of 171 students. Due to the lack of space for the students and the absence of collaboration from the part of Counsel 26, the French community created a committee called le Comité de l'avenir du Cercle français in 1972 and the students had to finish high school, so 10th to 12th grade, at Fredericton High School. On January 15, 1973, this new committee submitted a proposal to the premier, Richard Hatfield, to create a French community center that would also act as a school. In April of that year, the provincial and federal government discussed the possibility and one year later, on January 21, 1974, the premier announced that the construction would begin on the community center. This center was the first of its kind at the time in all of Canada.

== Enrollment ==
The school finally opened June 10, 1978 with a total of 392 students from first to 12th grade. Since its start at the community center, the student population has grown 515% over a period of 27 years, which is equivalent to an average increase of 19.1% per year.

In 1992, there were 821 students enrolled.

In 2005–2006, there were 1,041 students from kindergarten to grade 12.

Due to the large increase in the number of students, a second school on the same property, École des Bâtisseurs, opened in the fall of 2007. This school goes from kindergarten to grade 5. In 2014–2015, the combined student population surpassed 1,300 students, which pushed the community to build another school, École les Éclaireurs, on the North Side of Fredericton that will accommodate students from kindergarten to grade eight. On top of these schools, there is also one similar in Oromocto, an area outside of Fredericton, which also has students from kindergarten until grade eight. This school is called École Arc-en-ciel.

== See also ==
- List of schools in New Brunswick
