= Matthew Moss High School =

Location
- Matthew Moss Lane; Rochdale, Greater Manchester, OL11 3LU; England; 53.60149°N 2.18958°W

Information
- Type: Academy
- Motto: Learning for Life
- Local authority: Rochdale Council
- Trust: Watergrove Trust
- Department for Education URN: 147369 Tables
- Ofsted: Reports
- Headteacher: Charlotte Leach-Rogers
- Gender: Coeducational
- Age: 11 to 16
- Capacity: 1200
- Houses: oak, Beech, Lime, maple, willow
- Website: http://www.mmhs.co.uk/

Matthew Moss High School is a coeducational secondary school located in Rochdale in the English county of Greater Manchester.

Previously a community school administered by Rochdale Metropolitan Borough Council, in November 2019 Matthew Moss High School converted to academy status and is now part of the Watergrove Trust.

Matthew Moss High School offers GCSEs and BTECs as programmes of study for pupils. The school also operates the Matthew Moss Sports Centre which offers facilities to the local community as well as for pupils. Facilities include a sports hall, fitness suite and astroturf pitches.
