= New Brunswick Drama Festival =

Annual event in New Brunswick, Canada

- Nickname: NB DramaFest
- Genre: performing arts festival
- Frequency: Annually
- Venue: St. Thomas University
- Locations: Fredericton, New Brunswick
- Country: Canada
- Years active: 1953 – present
- Founded: Moncton, New Brunswick
- Most recent: May 4–6, 2026 (middle school); May 6–9, 2026 (high school)
- Attendance: 550
- Capacity: 1350
- Area: 0.16 km² (40 acres)
- Patron: Lieutenant Governor of NB
- Organiser: Suzanne Doyle Yerxa; Jeff Lloyd; Jared Mallard; Chris Matheson
- Sponsor: The Festival is organized under the auspices of the NBTA Middle Level Council and the High School Council with the sponsorship and support of : The Department of Education St. Thomas University University of New Brunswick Aramark Food Services Gerry MacMillan
- Website: nbdramafest.com

The New Brunswick Drama Festival, also known as the New Brunswick Provincial Drama Festival and Conference, the NBTA Drama Festival, or simply referred to as NB DramaFest, is an annual event held at the St. Thomas University campus in Fredericton, New Brunswick. Taking place every May, the event serves as a scholastic drama festival and competition for middle and high school students in New Brunswick.

The festival is divided into two segments, with middle school participants attending from Monday to Wednesday, and high school participants attending from Wednesday to Saturday. Throughout the festival, students have the chance to participate in evening workshops, allowing them to improve their skills through participating in evening workshops focused on areas like stage combat, improvisation, vocal training, and Shakespearean tutorials. The festival's performances adhere to guidelines that require durations between 25 and 60 minutes long. Professionals in theater from across the country attend the event to provide critiques of the students' work. Additionally, the festival's final evening features a dance, concluded by an awards ceremony and closing presentations.

== History ==
The first New Brunswick High School Drama Festival was held on May 23, 1953, in the Moncton High School auditorium. The first festival featured Salisbury High School, Port Elgin Memorial Regional High School, Petitcodiac Regional High School, and Rothesay Regional High School. The Dominion Drama Festival's governor was the event's adjudicator, and the trophies presented at the time were the Times-Transcript Trophy for the winning play, as well as CKCW trophies for the best individual actor and actress. Port Elgin Memorial Regional High School emerged as the winning school, with an actor from Petitcodiac and actress from Rothesay receiving the individual awards.
