= Apostolic Christian School =

Private school in New Brunswick, Canada

Coordinates: 46.908°N 67.3955°W

Information
- Established: 1976; 50 years ago

The Apostolic Christian School is a Canadian private Christian school located in Tobique Valley, New Brunswick.

The school was founded in 1976 by Pastor Jim McKillop and is administered by the Family Worship Centre (formerly known as the First Apostolic Pentecostal Church) of Plaster Rock.
