= Carleton North High School =

Location
- 30 School Street; Florenceville-Bristol, New Brunswick, E7L 2G2; Canada; 46.46747°N 67.57985°W

Information
- School type: High school
- Founded: 1977
- School board: Anglophone West School District
- School number: 3018
- Principal: Jason Smith
- Grades: 9-12
- Enrollment: 409 (2019)
- Language: English
- Website: cnhs.nbed.nb.ca

Carleton North High School is a high school located in Florenceville-Bristol, New Brunswick. Carleton North High School is in the Anglophone West School District and one of the last schools in New Brunswick that participated in the New Brunswick Potato Picking Week.

== See also ==
- List of schools in New Brunswick
