= École Mgr-Marcel-François-Richard =

Location
- 49 rue du Collège; Saint-Louis-de-Kent, New-Brunswick, E4X 1C2; Canada
- Coordinates: 46°44′25″N 64°58′21″W

Information
- School type: High School
- Founded: 1977 or 1978
- School board: Francophone Sud School District
- Grades: 9-12
- Enrollment: 214
- Language: French
- Website: mfr.nbed.nb.ca

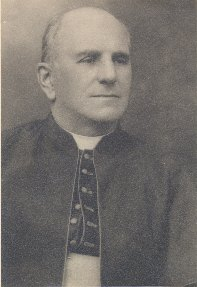
Marcel-François Richard

École Mgr-Marcel-François-Richard is a Francophone high school in Saint-Louis-de-Kent, New Brunswick, Canada operated by Francophone Sud School District.

The school is named after Monsignor Marcel-François Richard who was a priest who was especially prominent in advocating for Acadian education and rights.
