= École Samuel-de-Champlain =

Centre Scolaire Samuel-de-Champlain

Location
- 67 Ragged Point Road; Saint John, New Brunswick, E2K 5C3; Canada
- Coordinates: 45.2946°N 66.1149°W

Information
- School type: Elementary, Middle, and High school
- School board: Francophone Sud
- Principal: M. Eric Levesque
- Grades: K-12
- Enrollment: 896 (2011)
- Language: French
- Mascot: Jacquot le jaguar
- Team name: Les Jaguars
- Website: www.cscsc.ca

The Centre scolaire Samuel-de-Champlain is the only Francophone school in Saint John, New Brunswick. But there is a K to 5 located in Quispamsis about 30 minutes away named L’École des Pionniers.

== History ==
It is a K to 12 school. The school is named after French explorer Samuel de Champlain who named the Saint John River.

== See also ==
- Francophone Sud School District
- List of schools in New Brunswick
