= Baie-Sainte-Anne, New Brunswick =

Rural community in New Brunswick, Canada

Coordinates: 47°0′36.8″N 65°1′9″W

Location of Baie-Sainte-Anne in New Brunswick

Baie-Sainte-Anne or Baie Ste. Anne (2011 population: 1,387) is a rural community in Northumberland County, New Brunswick, Canada.

It is an acadian community located on the southern shore of Miramichi Bay near its opening into the Gulf of St. Lawrence. Possibly named for Sainte-Anne, patroness of the Micmacs. Peat farming and lobster processing are the area's major sources of income.

The former local service district of Baie Ste. Anne took its name from this community but spelt it differently.

== History ==
The community was founded in 1789 by Acadian settlers.

== Demographics ==
In the 2021 Census of Population conducted by Statistics Canada, Baie Ste. Anne had a population of 1,252 living in 566 of its 616 total private dwellings, a change of −5.1% from its 2016 population of 1,319. With a land area of 28.27 km^{2} (10.92 sq mi), it had a population density of 44.3/km^{2} (114.7/sq mi) in 2021.

== Education ==
District	School name	Grades	Notes
Francophone Sud	École Régionale de Baie Sainte-Anne	K-12	
Anglophone North			

== Notable people ==
- Yvon Durelle - boxer
- Norbert Thériault - Canadian Senator
- Camille Thériault - Politician

== See also ==
- List of communities in New Brunswick
