= White Head Elementary School =

School in New Brunswick, Canada

Location
- 278 White Head Rd; White Head Island, New Brunswick, E5G 1K6; Canada; 44.63647°N 66.71083°W

Information
- School type: Elementary
- School board: Anglophone South School District
- Grades: K-12
- Enrollment: 19 students, 2001
- Language: English

White Head Elementary School was located on White Head Island, adjacent to Grand Manan in Charlotte County, New Brunswick and in the Anglophone South School District.

== History ==
An 1844 map showed the presence of a school at Gull Cove on White Head Island.

The island had a dedicated school since at least 1876. There was reference to the island's school sharing a hall with the Independent Order of Odd Fellows.

In 1882, a new school was built which was used until 1971 when the current White Head Elementary was built, and opened in September 1972 at a ribbon-cutting with Minister of Education J. Lorne McGuigan.

In the 1950s, it taught approximately fifty students. Other students would take the ferry from White Head to attend Middle or High School on Grand Manan. It taught Kindgarten through Grade 5, until it was reduced to Grade 4 to avoid needing to bring a new teacher for intensive French education.

In 2006, it had 21 students, and by 2015 it had only ten students and faced possible closure as the principal noted White Head had "no young families with little kids" that would boost future enrollment.

=== Closure ===
It had a playground with picnic tables and open fields, and as of 2020 the CBC noted it had four swings for only three students. It climbed to four students, but in 2025 dwindled to only two students, and a Sustainability Study concluded it was no longer possible to offer equitable education at the school.
