= Campobello Island Consolidated School =

Location
- 1722 Route 774; Wilsons Beach, New Brunswick, E5E 1K7; Canada
- Coordinates: 44.910052°N 66.918152°W

Information
- School type: Elementary, Middle & High school
- School board: Anglophone South School District
- Principal: Daphne Carten
- Grades: K-12
- Language: English
- Website: Official website

Campobello Island Consolidated School is a K-12 school located on Campobello Island in Charlotte County, New Brunswick. Campobello Island Consolidated School is in the Anglophone South School District.

The school opened in September 1967, ending a "difficult period" that saw a "general lack of educational opportunity" on the island.

In 2017, the school was one of four English-speaking schools in the province to begin 15-minute daily French lessons.

In 2022, the school had its first full capacity graduation.

== See also ==
- List of schools in New Brunswick
- Anglophone South School District
