= Sir James Dunn Academy =

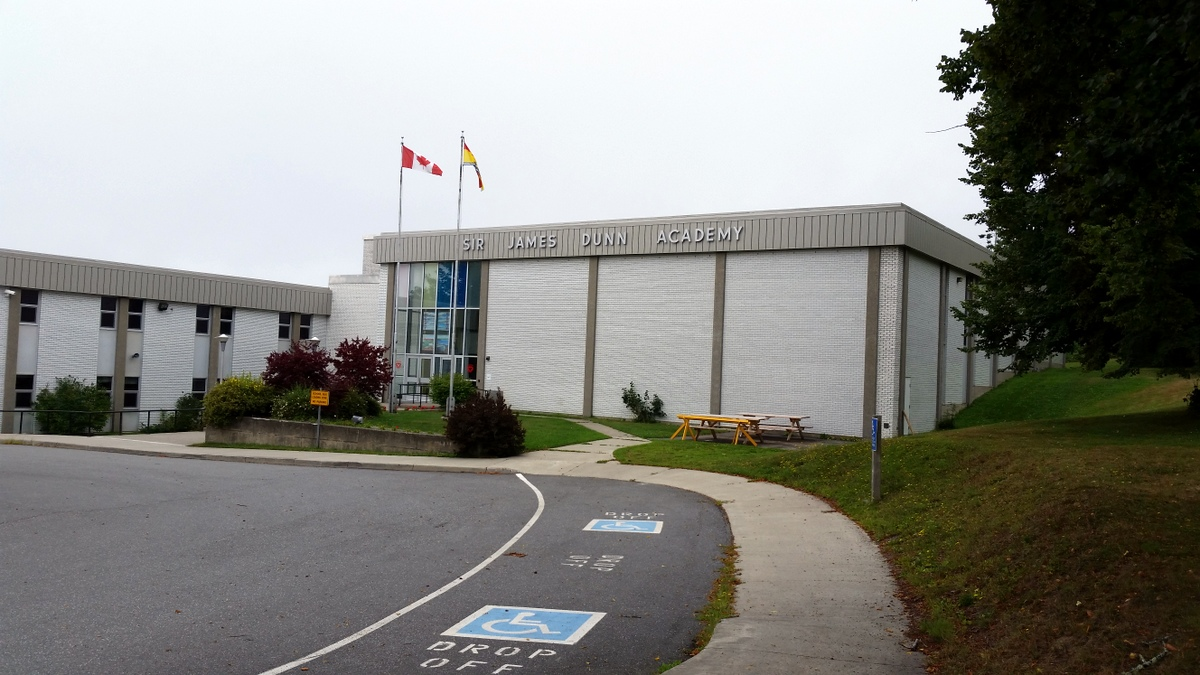
- Sir James Dunn Academy in August 2015

Location
- 180 King Street; St. Andrews, New Brunswick, E5B 1Y7; Canada; 45.078026°N 67.049675°W

Information
- Other name: SJDA
- Type: Public High School
- Motto: No Success Without Labour
- Religious affiliation: Non-religious
- Established: 1978
- Principal: David O'Leary
- Age range: 10 to 18+
- Enrollment: 162
- Colours: Red and White
- Website: web1.nbed.nb.ca/sites/ASD-S/2310

Sir James Dunn Academy (SJDA) is a middle/high school that services eastern Charlotte County in southern New Brunswick, Canada. Located in the town of St. Andrews, SJDA is home to some 300 students, from grades 6–12.

== General information ==
Sir James Dunn Academy, named for the financier, industrialist and benefactor of the early 20th century who made his summer home in this community, offers a wide variety of sports and activities to its students, and various sporting and theatrical venues to the public. The school, which was in 1966 created and financed through the vision of Lady Beaverbrook whose first husband was Sir James, bears the Latin motto Non palma sin labore.

== See also ==
- List of schools in New Brunswick
- Anglophone South School District
