= Heritage Festival =

- Genre: Music festival
- Frequency: Annual
- Location: United States
- Years active: 1980–present
- Participants: Middle school and high school ensembles
- Major events: Adjudicated performances

Heritage Festival refers to one of about 100 music festivals held throughout the United States where middle school and high school-aged musical ensembles are adjudicated on a national standard. These groups include choirs, bands, and orchestras. The festivals were founded in 1980, and are currently a part of WorldStrides OnStage Programs. The top performing groups in these Heritage Festivals are invited to perform in the Festival of Gold Elite Festival Series or the Festival at Carnegie Hall.
