= Grand Manan Community School =

Elementary, middle & high school in Grand Manan, New Brunswick, Canada

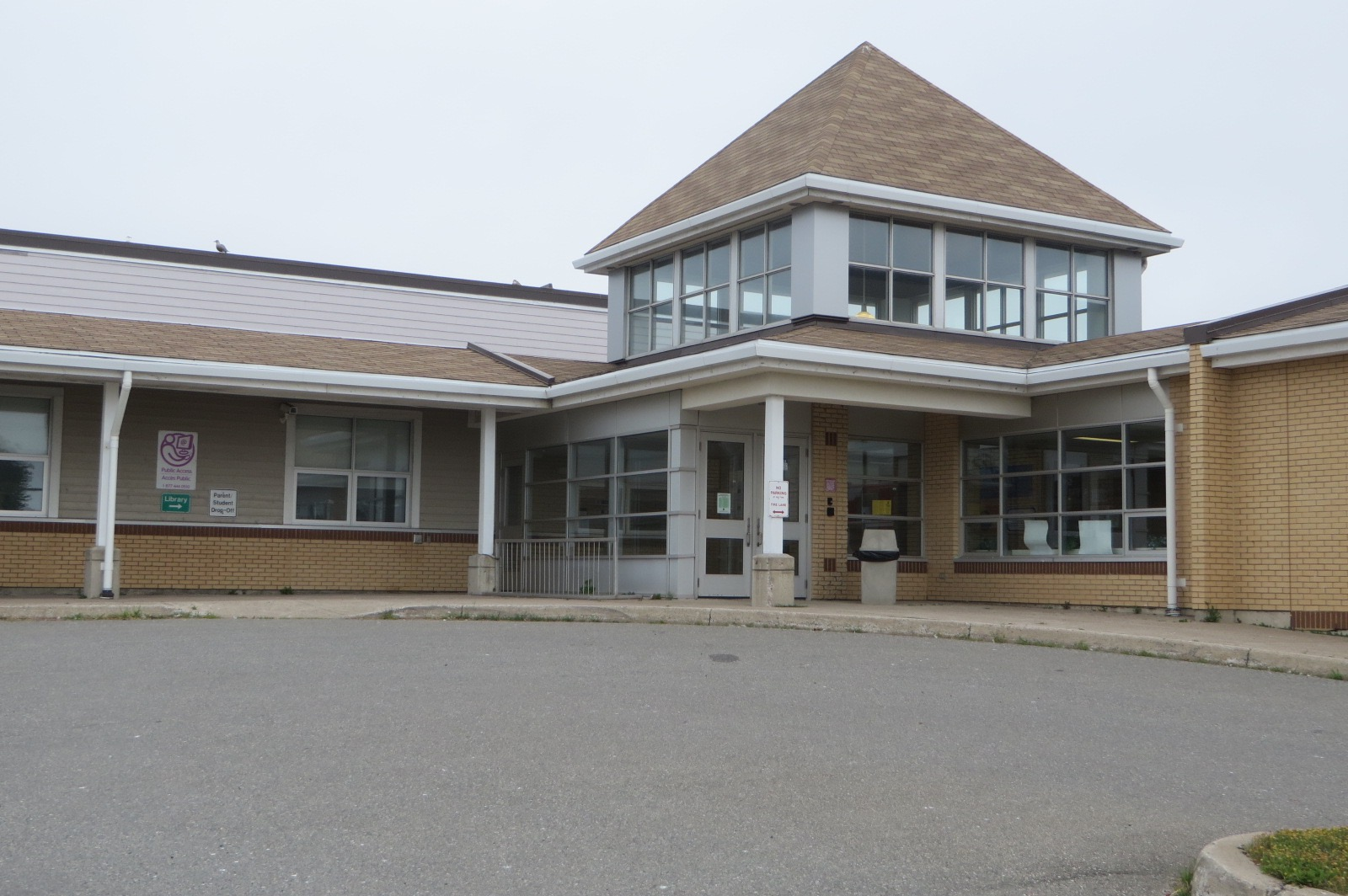

Location
- 1144 Route 776; Grand Manan, New Brunswick, E5G 4E8; Canada; 44.6876°N 66.7659°W

Information
- School type: Elementary, Middle & High school
- School board: Anglophone South School District
- School number: 2201
- Principal: Wesley Silliker
- Teaching staff: 27.7
- Grades: K-12
- Enrolment: 370 (2022-2023)
- Language: English
- Website: web1.nbed.nb.ca/sites/ASD-S/2201/Pages/default.aspx

Grand Manan Community School is a K-12 school located on Grand Manan Island in Charlotte County, New Brunswick. Grand Manan Community School is in the Anglophone South School District.

As of 1951, Howard Douglass was principal of the school.

Phase 2 of the school was completed in 1999.

Prior to the consolidated school, there were a number of schools that served the island population including Deep Cove School and Grand Harbour High School.

== See also ==
- List of schools in New Brunswick
- Anglophone South School District
