= Tobique Valley High School =

School in New Brunswick, Canada

Coordinates: 46.909°N 67.396°W

Tobique Valley Middle High School (TVMHS) is a school located in Tobique Valley, New Brunswick, Canada, that serves students from grades 6 through 12, and is within the Anglophone West School District. Constructed in 1947, TVMHS was formerly known as Tobique Valley High School until the mid-1990s when it began to house classes from grades lower than the junior high level.

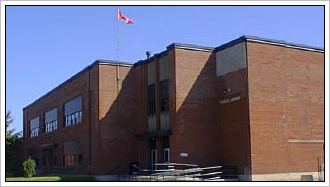
Tobique Valley Middle High School

TVMHS varsity sports teams are known as the Panthers.

During the 2008–2009 school year, TVMHS reported an enrolment of approximately 325 students.

During the 2009–10 school year, the girls' basketball team won the 2010 NBIAA AA Senior Girls' Championship at the Aitken Centre in Fredericton.

In the year 2011 TVHS boys' basketball team broke a two-year losing streak, against St. Mary's Academy.

== Notable alumni ==
- Wayne Marston – Canadian Member of Parliament, Hamilton East-Stoney Creek, 2006–2015
- Robert Nielsen – journalist and editor, formerly of the Toronto Star
