= Fundy Middle and High School =

Fundy Middle-High School

Location
- 44 Mount Pleasant Rd; St. George, New Brunswick, E5C 3K3; Canada; 45.1254°N 66.8103°W

Information
- Type: Public High School
- Motto: "Look Forward With Hope, Look Back With Pride"
- Religious affiliation: Non-Religious
- Established: 1978
- Principal: Mrs. Rebecca Rudderham
- Age range: 11 to 18+
- Enrollment: 575 (2017-2018)
- Colours: Blue, Light Blue and White
- Website: fundyhs.nbed.nb.ca

Fundy Middle and High School (FMHS) is a middle and high school that services eastern Charlotte County in southern New Brunswick, Canada. Located in the town of St. George, FMHS is home to some 500+ students, from grades 6–12. The school is broken into a middle level (6, 7 & 8) and high school (9-12).

Fundy Middle and High School opened in 1978, replacing the older and smaller schools in St George, Blacks Harbour and Back Bay. It is the only high school in the St. George area, and has recently been designated a "community school", bringing a new era of cooperation between the school and the community it serves.

== General information ==
Fundy High School offers a wide variety of sports and activities to its students, and various sporting and theatrical venues to the public.

== The building ==
Fundy High School was built in 1978. The building has a double gym, a BBT lab, three computer labs, a greenhouse, and a Theatre used for plays, lectures by guest speakers, and district drama festivals. There is also a biology lab, chemistry lab, and physics lab, a media resource center, an automotive/metal shop, electrical shop, and a wood working shop.

== Notable students and teachers ==
- Ian Lee, MLA for Fundy-The Isles-Saint John Lorneville, teacher
- Megan Kingston, Assistant Coach for Women’s lacrosse team Canada, teacher

== See also ==
- List of schools in New Brunswick
- Anglophone South School District
