= St. Stephen High School =

Coordinates: 45.2074°N 67.2737°W

Location
- 282 King Street; St. Stephen, New Brunswick, E3L 4X7; Canada

Information
- School type: Public High school
- Motto: "Learn. Achieve. Aspire. Tomorrow begins today."
- School board: Anglophone South School District
- Principal: Krista Amos
- Grades: 9-12
- Language: English
- Colours: Green and White
- Website: ststephenhigh.nbed.ca

St. Stephen High School is a grade 9-12 school located in St. Stephen, New Brunswick.

== See also ==
- List of schools in New Brunswick
- Anglophone South School District
