= John Caldwell School =

Location
- 130 Victoria St. Grand Falls, New Brunswick, E3Z 3B7; Canada
- Coordinates: 47.0481°N 67.7358°W

Information
- School type: Public, coeducational school
- Motto: Esse quam videri (To be, rather than to seem (to be))
- Founded: 1909
- School district: Anglophone West
- Principal: Kevin Harding
- Vice Principal: Rebecca Harding
- Staff: 66
- Grades: K-12
- Enrollment: 554 (as of 2011)
- Language: English, French
- Colours: Black and Gold
- Team name: Golden Knights
- Website: web1.nbed.nb.ca/sites/asd-w/jcs/Pages/default.aspx

John Caldwell School is a consolidated school in Anglophone West of New Brunswick. It is located in the town of Grand Falls in Victoria County.

== History ==
The first school building, a two-story structure, was built on the same site in 1909. The first principal was J. C. Higgins. It was first called the Flat School (since it was built on the flat land near the river) and was later called the Grand Falls Graded School.

In 1951, John Caldwell, who had graduated from the school, became the principal.

In 1951, a brick building was built on the same lot. It housed the industrial shops, gymnasium and home economics facilities. It was named the Grand Falls Composite High School. A wing was built in 1966, and in 1969 the name was changed to the John Caldwell School.

In 1982, the original wooden building was demolished leaving only the new structure. In 1971, the school became a Junior High School and in 1981 it became the Junior-Senior High School for the anglophone students of the area. It underwent major expansion began in 1989 to include the English elementary students making it a K-12 facility with English and French emersion

== See also ==
- List of schools in New Brunswick
- Grand Falls, New Brunswick
