= Chipman Forest Avenue School =

Location
- 33 Forest Avenue; Chipman, New Brunswick, E4A 3A2; Canada
- Coordinates: 46.182790°N 65.867478°W

Information
- School type: Middle and high school
- Founded: 1989
- School board: Anglophone West School District
- Principal: Yvonne Caverhill
- Grades: 6–12
- Enrollment: 220
- Language: English
- Website: cfasnewsnet.nbed.nb.ca

Chipman Forest Avenue School is a grade 6–12 school located in Chipman, New Brunswick. It is located in the Anglophone West School District. Enrollment for 2023–2024 was 173 students.
