= Minto Memorial High School =

Location
- 126 Park Street; Minto, New Brunswick, E3C 3C7; Canada; 46.079686°N 66.057228°W

Information
- School type: High school
- Founded: 1949
- School board: Anglophone West School District
- Principal: Nelson Arsenault
- Grades: 9-12
- Enrollment: 200 (2025)
- Language: English
- Website: mintomemorial.nbed.ca

Minto Memorial High School is a 9-12 high school located in Minto, New Brunswick. MMHS is in the Anglophone West School District. Minto Memorial serves the area west of Grand Lake, including: the greater Douglas Harbour, Maquapit Lake, French Lake, Lakeville Corner, Ripples, Minto, and Hardwood Ridge.

== See also ==
- List of schools in New Brunswick
- Anglophone West School District
