= Francophone Nord-Ouest School District =

School district in New Brunswick, Canada

Location
- Canada

District information
- Type: Public
- Grades: K-12

Other information
- Website: dsfno.nbed.ca

Francophone Nord-Ouest School District (French: District Scolaire Francophone Nord-Ouest) is a Canadian school district in New Brunswick.

Francophone Nord-Ouest is a Francophone district operating 21 public schools (gr. K-12) in Carleton, Victoria, Madawaska and Restigouche counties.

Current enrollment is approximately 7,000 students and 470 teachers. Francophone Nord-Ouest School District is headquartered in Edmundston.

== See also ==
- List of school districts in New Brunswick
- List of schools in New Brunswick
