= Hartland Community School =

Coordinates: 46.3071°N 67.5141°W

- Hartland, New Brunswick; Canada

Hartland Community School is a K-12 school located in Hartland, New Brunswick, Canada. Hartland Community School has around 575 students. The students in Hartland Community School are from all of Carleton County. The school logo is a garnet-colored husky.

The school is part of Anglophone West School District, which includes 70 schools, and was part of School District 14 prior to a provincial school district reform.

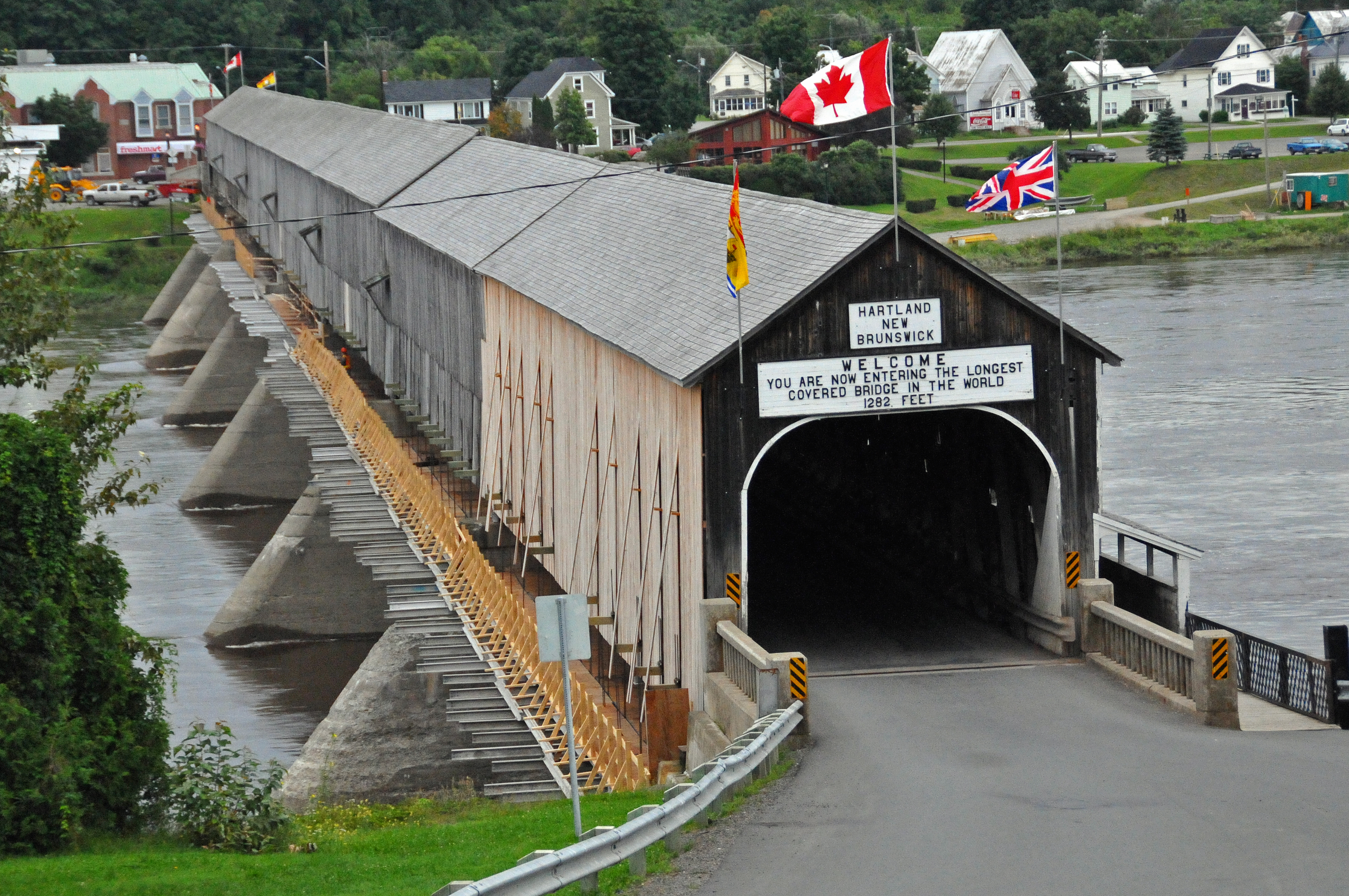
An image of the historical Hartland Covered Bridge, built in 1902, which is near the school and is a major focal point of the town.

In 2020, The school launched a school-run newspaper called the Husky Howler.

Hartland Community school was opened in May 2007 to consolidate the local elementary and high schools into one building and replace the aging infastructure of the former two schools. The former Hartland High school has been largely Abandoned and the former Central Carleton Elementary has been renovated into office space for a local logisitics and trucking company.

The school was also one of the first schools in the province to utilize SmartBoard's, an interactive digital screen based whiteboard, and the first school in the province to utilize dry erase boards over chalk.

== See also ==
- List of schools in New Brunswick
- Anglophone West School District
