= Stanley Consolidated School =

Location
- 28 Bridge Street; Nashwaak, New Brunswick, E6B 1B2; Canada; 46.28162680703811°N 66.73901393411677°W

Information
- School type: Public
- Motto: Volens et Potens (Willing and Able)
- Founded: 1949
- School board: Anglophone West School District
- Administrator: Cheryl Reid
- Principal: Katherine Loughrey
- Grades: K-12
- Enrollment: 250
- Language: English
- Colours: Navy and Gold
- Mascot: Blue Devil
- Team name: Blue Devils
- Website: stanleyhigh.nbed.nb.ca

Stanley Consolidated School is a combined elementary, middle and high school in Nashwaak, New Brunswick, Canada. It educates students from Nashwaak and the surrounding area. Approximately 250 students attend the school.
