= École Clément-Cormier =

Location
- 37 avenue Richard; Bouctouche, New-Brunswick, E4S 3T5; Canada; 46°28′32″N 64°43′26″W

Information
- School type: High School
- Founded: 1969
- School board: Francophone Sud
- Grades: 9-12
- Enrollment: 504
- Language: French
- Website: web1.nbed.nb.ca/sites/district11/cc/Pages/default.aspx

École Clément-Cormier is a Francophone high school in Bouctouche, New Brunswick, Canada.
