= École Marie-Gaétane =

Location
- 16 rue Fraser; Kedgwick, New-Brunswick, E8B 1E6; Canada; 47°38′52″N 67°20′50″W

Information
- School type: High School
- Founded: 1974
- School board: Francophone Nord-Ouest
- Grades: 8-12
- Enrollment: 156
- Language: French
- Area: North New-Brunswick
- Website: emg.nbed.nb.ca

École Marie-Gaétane is a Francophone high school in Kedgwick, New Brunswick, Canada.
