= Oromocto High School =

Secondary school in New Brunswick, Canada

- Oromocto High School

Location
- 25 MacKenzie Avenue; Oromocto, New Brunswick, E2V 1K4; Canada

Information
- Type: Public High School
- Motto: Finis Coronat Laborem ("The End Crowns the Work")
- Established: 1965
- Principal: Molly Nugent
- Staff: 100
- Grades: 9–12
- Age range: 14–20
- Enrollment: 1,137 (2022–2023)
- Colors: Blue and Gold
- Website: ohs.nbed.nb.ca

Oromocto High School (OHS) is a high school located in Oromocto, New Brunswick, Canada. It is the third largest school in the Anglophone West School District (ASD-W) which contains 70 institutions and around 23 000 students total. OHS is the source of education for about 1032 of those students, with between 1000 and 1100 annually. Oromocto High School is also the location for the Oromocto Education Centre which looks over different schools within ASD-W within Oromocto and the surrounding area. The principal is Molly Nugent; of the 2026-2027 school year.

== History ==
Oromocto High School was built using only wood in 1965 with additions added in 1976. The additions were mostly cement-based. The building has sixty-four classrooms, a double gym, seven computer labs, a physics lab, a chemistry lab, a greenhouse with flowers on the roof, and a 350-seat "Teaching Theatre" that was newly remodelled used for plays, lectures by guest speakers, and district drama festivals.

== General information ==
OHS is currently the 6th largest school in the province of New Brunswick as of fall 2017 (when looking specifically at enrolment rates).

== Notable alumni ==
- Jody Carr, politician
