= Sussex Christian School (New Brunswick) =

Coordinates: 45.71844959824352°N 65.52654179096048°W

Sussex Christian School (SCS) is a private school located in Sussex, New Brunswick, Canada. The school accepts students from pre-kindergarten through to grade 12. It was founded in 1982. The school has a basketball team and a soccer team.
