= Woodstock High School (New Brunswick) =

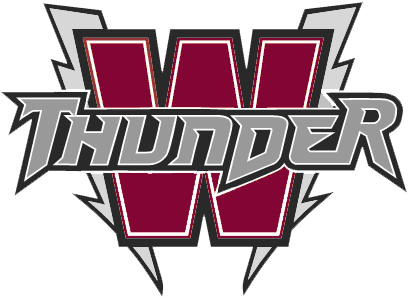

Location
- 144 Connell Park Rd; Woodstock, New Brunswick, E7M 1M4; Canada; 46°9′45.62″N 67°35′14.32″W

Information
- School type: High school
- Motto: Palma Qui Meruit Ferat (Let him who deserves it have the reward.)
- Opened: 1977
- School district: Anglophone West
- Principal: Derrick O’Leary
- Vice Principal: Nicole Giberson
- Staff: 45
- Grades: 9-12
- Enrollment: 750 (as of 2008)
- Language: English, some French immersion courses
- Colours: Garnet and Grey
- Team name: Thunder; Lady Thunder
- Feeder schools: Townsview School and Meduxnekeag Consolidated School
- Website: whs.nbed.nb.ca

Woodstock High School is a high school located in Woodstock, New Brunswick, Canada. Woodstock High receives new students primarily from Townsview School and Meduxnekeag Consolidated School, also in Woodstock.

== History ==
In 1975, Woodstock High School was built. It first opened in 1977.

== Hockey teams ==
Woodstock High's Lady Thunder Hockey team was awarded the New Brunswick Human Rights Award, and the Grace Under Pressure Award in 2009.

Woodstock High's Varsity Men's Hockey teams have won multiple provincial championships and awards.

== Fine arts ==
The WHS Choir is a Provincial Championship choir and National Championship finalist. The Improv team is a former Provincial Champion and National Championship finalist.
