= Polyvalente Thomas-Albert =

École Polyvalente Thomas-Albert

Location
- 215 Guimont St. Grand Falls, New Brunswick, E3Y 1C7; Canada; 47.0564°N 67.7310°W

Information
- School type: Public, coeducational secondary school
- Founded: 1969
- School board: Francophone Nord-Ouest
- Principal: Mylène Savoie Nadeau
- Grades: 7-12
- Enrollment: 627
- Language: French
- Colours: Blue , and red
- Website: www.thomas-albert.ca

École Polyvalente Thomas-Albert (French for Thomas Albert High School) is a Francophone public secondary school in Francophone Nord-Ouest of New Brunswick. It is located in the town of Grand Falls in Victoria County.

== See also ==
- List of schools in New Brunswick
- Grand Falls, New Brunswick
- Madawaska County, New Brunswick
