= Polyvalente Louis-J.-Robichaud =

Coordinates: 46°13′07″N 64°31′56″W

Location
- 435 rue Main; Shediac, New-Brunswick, E4P 0S6; Canada

Information
- School type: High School
- Motto: "S'Unir Pour Batir"
- Founded: 1970
- School board: Francophone Sud
- Principal: Joey Veilleux
- Grades: 9-12
- Enrollment: 667
- Language: French
- Area: Shédiac
- Colours: Brown & Yellow
- Mascot: Pat
- Team name: Les Patriotes
- Website: web1.nbed.nb.ca/sites/district11/ljr

Polyvalente Louis-J.-Robichaud is a Francophone high school in Shediac, New Brunswick, Canada. The school was named after the first elected Acadian premier of New Brunswick Louis J. Robichaud.
