= Southern Victoria High School =

Location
- 13 School Street; Southern Victoria, New Brunswick, E7H 4T4; Canada
- Coordinates: 46.749363°N 67.698827°W

Information
- School type: High school
- Founded: 1953
- School board: Anglophone West School District
- Principal: Justin Tompkins
- Vice Principal: Angela Barclay
- Grades: 9-12
- Enrollment: 375
- Language: English, French immersion
- Colours: Green and Gold
- Mascot: Ike the Vike
- Team name: Southern Victoria Vikings
- Website: svhs.nbed.nb.ca

Southern Victoria High School is a school located in Southern Victoria, New Brunswick, Canada. It is located in the Anglophone West School District. It offers grades 9-12.

In addition to education in English, the school offers a French immersion program.
