= Polyvalente Louis-Mailloux =

Location
- 30, rue Cormier; Caraquet, New Brunswick, E1W 1B7; Canada; 47°47′16″N 64°57′33″W

Information
- School type: High School
- Founded: 1970
- School board: Francophone Nord-Est
- Grades: 9-12
- Enrollment: 650
- Language: French
- Area: North New-Brunswick
- Website: plm.nbed.nb.ca

Polyvalente Louis-Mailloux is a Francophone high school in Caraquet, New Brunswick, Canada.
