= Polyvalente W.-A. Losier =

Location
- 585 Rue de l'Église; Tracadie, New-Brunswick, E1X 1G5; Canada
- Coordinates: 47.513244°N 64.920963°W

Information
- School type: High School
- Founded: 1969
- School board: Francophone Nord-Est
- Grades: 9-12
- Language: French
- Area: North New-Brunswick
- Mascot: Bison
- Team name: Bisons
- Website: wal.nbed.nb.ca

Polyvalente W.-A. Losier is a francophone high school located in Tracadie-Sheila, New Brunswick, Canada.
