= Polyvalente A.-J.-Savoie =

Location
- 210 rue Mgr-Martin Est; Saint-Quentin, New-Brunswick, E1X 1G5; Canada; 47°30′56″N 67°23′08″W

Information
- School type: High School
- Founded: 1971
- School board: Francophone Nord-Est
- Grades: 7-12
- Enrollment: 233
- Language: French
- Area: North New-Brunswick
- Website: www.dsfno.ca/district-scolaire/ecoles/item/polyvalente-a-j-savoie-pajs

Polyvalente A.-J.-Savoie is a Francophone high school in Saint-Quentin, New Brunswick, Canada.
