= McAdam High School =

Location
- 29 Lake Avenue; McAdam, New Brunswick, E6J 1N7; Canada
- Coordinates: 45.5944022°N 67.3301896°W

Information
- Type: Public
- School district: Anglophone West School District
- School number: 2704
- Principal: Matt Clements
- Teaching staff: 9.5
- Grades: 6–12
- Enrollment: 88 (2022-2023)
- Website: mhs.nbed.ca

McAdam High School, previously known as McAdam Composite High School, is a grades 6–12 school located in McAdam, New Brunswick, Canada. The town and its high school are both named for late-19th-century politician John McAdam. It was founded in 1924, and renovated in 1984. McAdam High is known for its cooperative education program.

== Description ==
McAdam High School is a two-story wood frame structure of 4,424 square metres (47,620 sq ft). It is located within the Anglophone West School District.

According to the district, in the 2022–2023 school year McAdam High School had a total enrollment of 87 students, utilizing 23% of the school building's capacity, and the school employed 9.5 full-time equivalent teachers. A 2014 demographic study showed a 15-year decline in enrollment from 183 students in 1999 to 101 students in 2014.

The curriculum at McAdam includes cooperative education, which places students in local businesses and in the Fredericton area.

== History ==
Built in 1924, the school was last renovated in 1984.

The 1998 installation of a broad base technology lab brought praise from Premier Camille Theriault, who presided at the opening of the lab. The premier observed the lab would enhance students' abilities to compete in the global marketplace.

In 2007, McAdam students "adopted a highway and also won an award for recycling".

== Sports ==
The school's sports teams are members of the New Brunswick Interscholastic Athletic Association. In 2012, none of the students at McAdam High did better than 4th place in the provincial athletic competition.

A skateboard park, funded by a Royal Canadian Mounted Police Foundation grant, opened in 2011 adjacent to the high school.

The school mascot, "Warriors", came under criticism after complaints that the mascots of McAdam High School and Woodstock High School promoted racism, following a basketball game between the two rivals.

== Notable alumni ==
- Emerson Moffitt, 1924 graduate.
