= Leo Hayes High School =

Location
- 499 Cliffe Street; Fredericton, New Brunswick, E3A 9P5; Canada; 45°58′45″N 66°37′18″W

Information
- School type: High school
- Motto: Dreams are the Seedlings of Reality
- Founded: 1999
- Principal: Kendra Frizzell
- Teaching staff: 106.5 (on an FTE basis)
- Grades: 9-12
- Enrollment: 1,805 (2024–2025)
- Language: English; Canadian French
- Colours: Navy and white
- Mascot: Leo the Lion
- Team name: Lions
- Website: leohayeshigh.nbed.nb.ca
- Last updated: September 12, 2025

Leo Hayes High School is a public high school in Fredericton, New Brunswick, Canada, serving students between grades 9 and 12 on the city's north side. The school's motto is Dreams are the Seedlings of Reality.

== History ==
The school opened in 1999 as a result of complaints about overcrowding at the south side Fredericton High School. The first graduating class was in 2002.

Sports teams are called the "Lions", and their school mascot is a lion named "Leo". The school is named after Leo Hayes, who was once the marshal of the Fredericton Police force. He sold the land to the province to build a school on in 1968; however, the school was not built until 1998.

Leo Hayes High School is the newest of the 51 high schools in New Brunswick. It is located on property located on the north side of the city of Fredericton and overlooks the Saint John River. The construction of the school commenced on August 1, 1998. Leo Hayes High opened its doors to students on September 7, 1999, with a student enrollment of 962, a teaching staff of 50 and teaching support staff of 11. There are approximately 1,600 students enrolled in grades 9 through 12.

Leo Hayes High School is the second school built in New Brunswick under a public-private government partnership. The builder and owner of the school is Diamond Construction Ltd. of Fredericton; the architects were High Design of Fredericton. In the summer of 2009, a new wing of economic temporary classrooms was added to accommodate the growing number of enrolled students; this wing was then further extended during the summer of 2013, with the addition of two extra classrooms, and then again during the summer of 2014, with the addition of another two extra classrooms, bringing the total number of temporary classrooms to eight.

== Design ==
The facility is wheel chair accessible and boasts 53 classrooms - 14 with movable walls, 3 broad based technology labs, and 2 gymnasia. There is also an exercise room and weight room; physics, chemistry, biology and general science labs; 4 art rooms, 2 music rooms, and a bi-level library/media centre and cafeteria. The school also has a football field and track, as well as two practice fields. The school does not have a theatre. It is the only school in the Fredericton area (between middle and high schools) which was built without one.

The school's motto is the Latin phrase Somnia sunt circuli veritatis which means "Dreams are the seedlings to reality." This motto was chosen by the students voting for the best fitting motto the first year the school was opened.

First Nations imagery, as represented by a stylistic dream catcher, is found in the large window, which is over the main entrance of the school and in the school lobby. This linkage reflects the connections to the First Nation Community of St. Mary's, which is located adjoining the school grounds.

== Notable alumni ==
- Jake Allen, professional hockey player
- Jeremy Dutcher, musician
- Jake Thomas (Canadian football), professional football player
