= Fredericton High School =

Location
- 300 Priestman Street; Fredericton, New Brunswick, E3B 6J8; Canada; 45.9415261°N 66.6628106°W

Information
- School type: High school
- Motto: Palma Non Sine Pulvere (No Reward Without Effort)
- Founded: 1800; 226 years ago
- School district: Anglophone West School District
- Principal: Peter Batt
- Grades: 9-12
- Enrollment: 2,136 (2022-2023)
- Language: English
- Colours: Yellow and Black
- Team name: Black Kats
- Yearbook: The Graduate
- Website: frederictonhigh.nbed.nb.ca

Fredericton High School is a public secondary school located in the city of Fredericton, New Brunswick, Canada that serves students under grades 9-12. The current principal is Peter Batt. With a student enrollment of 2,136 during the 2022-2023 school year, Fredericton High School is the largest grade school in the province.

== History ==
When the city of Fredericton was initially laid out in 1758, city planners set aside a plot of land in the downtown region that was intended to become a school. That school was incorporated in 1790 as the College of New Brunswick and was intended to be a boarding school, patterned after the boys' public schools in England. In 1829 when King's College opened in Fredericton, the school was renamed to the Collegiate Grammar School, and was supported by the college. In 1871, the Free School Act was enacted, and the school again changed its name, this time to the Collegiate High School. At this time it became a preparatory school for King's College, which by then had become the University of New Brunswick.

=== FHS copes with the Syrian exodus ===
In July 2016, Fredericton High School attracted media attention after The Rebel obtained internal documents discussing the transitional challenges of hosting new students fleeing the Syrian Civil War. Said administrator Chantal Lafargue,

We are living in a province where there are no official EAL (English as an alternative language) courses for high school, no alternate programming for war-affected youth, no personnel that have designated roles, like translator-interpreters, for example to help us settle youth down, make them feel at ease and help them navigate a whole new set of cultural and social norms.

Canadian Minister of Immigration John McCallum has said that while the refugee program is a federal responsibility, schools are a responsibility of the provinces.

== Notable alumni ==
- Measha Brueggergosman, opera singer
- Bliss Carman, poet
- Justin Conn, Calgary Stampeders linebacker
- Matt DeCourcey, Member of the Parliament of Canada for Fredericton
- Paul Hodgson, former MLB player (Toronto Blue Jays)
- Marianne Limpert, Olympic silver medalist swimmer
- Elizabeth Roberts MacDonald (1864–1922), Canadian writer, suffragist
- Dan McCullough, B.C. Lions long snapper
- Murray Douglas Morton, Member of Parliament and judge
- David Myles, vocalist
- Sir Charles G.D. Roberts, poet
- William Harris Lloyd Roberts (1884–1966), writer, poet, playwright
- Francis Sherman, poet
- Anna Silk, actress
- Matt Stairs, former Major League Baseball right fielder, Philadelphia Phillies, 2008 World Series Champion
- John Williamson, Member of the Parliament of Canada for New Brunswick Southwest
