= Francophone Sud School District =

School district in New Brunswick, Canada

Location
- 425 Champlain Street Dieppe, New Brunswick, E1A 1P2 Southeast New Brunswick Canada
- Coordinates: 46°05′52″N 64°44′14″W
- Chair of the board: Paul Demers
- Director of education: Monique Boudreau

Students and staff
- Students: 15,500+
- Staff: 4,000+

Other information
- Website: francophonesud.nbed.nb.ca

Francophone Sud School District (French: District scolaire francophone Sud) is a Francophone Canadian school district in New Brunswick with its central offices in Dieppe. The district operates 37 schools in the south-central part of New Brunswick, including Albert, Westmorland, Saint John, Charlotte, Kings, Queens, Sunbury, York, Kent and Northumberland counties.

More than 15,500 students attend Sud schools and 4,000 staff are employed.

== History ==
New Brunswick School Districts 1 and 11 merged on June 30, 2012, to form Francophone Sud.

== Primary schools ==
School name	Grades	Location
Centre scolaire Samuel-de-Champlain	K-12	Saint-Jean
École Abbey-Landry	K-8	Memramcook
École Amirault	K-2	Dieppe
École Anna-Malenfant	K-5	Dieppe
École Antonine-Maillet	6-8	Dieppe
École Arc-en-ciel	K-8	Oromocto
École Blanche-Bourgeois	K-8	Cocagne
École Calixte-F.-Savoie	K-8	Sainte-Anne-de-Kent
École Camille-Vautour	K-8	Champdoré
École Carrefour Beausoleil	K-12	Miramichi
École Carrefour de l'Acadie	6-8	Dieppe
École Champlain	K-8	Moncton
École des Bâtisseurs	K-5	Fredericton
École des Pionniers	K-5	Quispamsis
École Donat-Robichaud	K-8	Cap-Pelé
École Dr-Marguerite-Michaud	K-8	Bouctouche
École Grande-Digue	K-8	Grande-Digue
École Le Marais	3-5	Dieppe
École Le Mascaret	6-8	Moncton
École Le Sommet	K-8	Moncton
École Les Éclaireurs	K-8	Fredericton
École Mgr-François-Bourgeois	K-8	Shediac
École Mgr-Marcel-François-Richard	K-12	Saint-Louis-de-Kent
École Mont-Carmel	K-8	Sainte-Marie-de-Kent
École Notre-Dame	K-8	Notre-Dame-de-Kent
École Père-Edgar-T.-LeBlanc	K-8	Grand-Barachois
École Régionale de Baie-Sainte-Anne	K-12	Baie-Sainte-Anne
École Saint-Henri	K-5	Moncton
École Sainte-Anne	6-12	Fredericton
École Sainte-Bernadette	K-5	Moncton
École Sainte-Thérèse	K-5	Dieppe
École Soleil Levant	K-8	Richibucto
Étoile de l'Acadie	K-12	Nouvelle-Arcadie

== Secondary schools ==
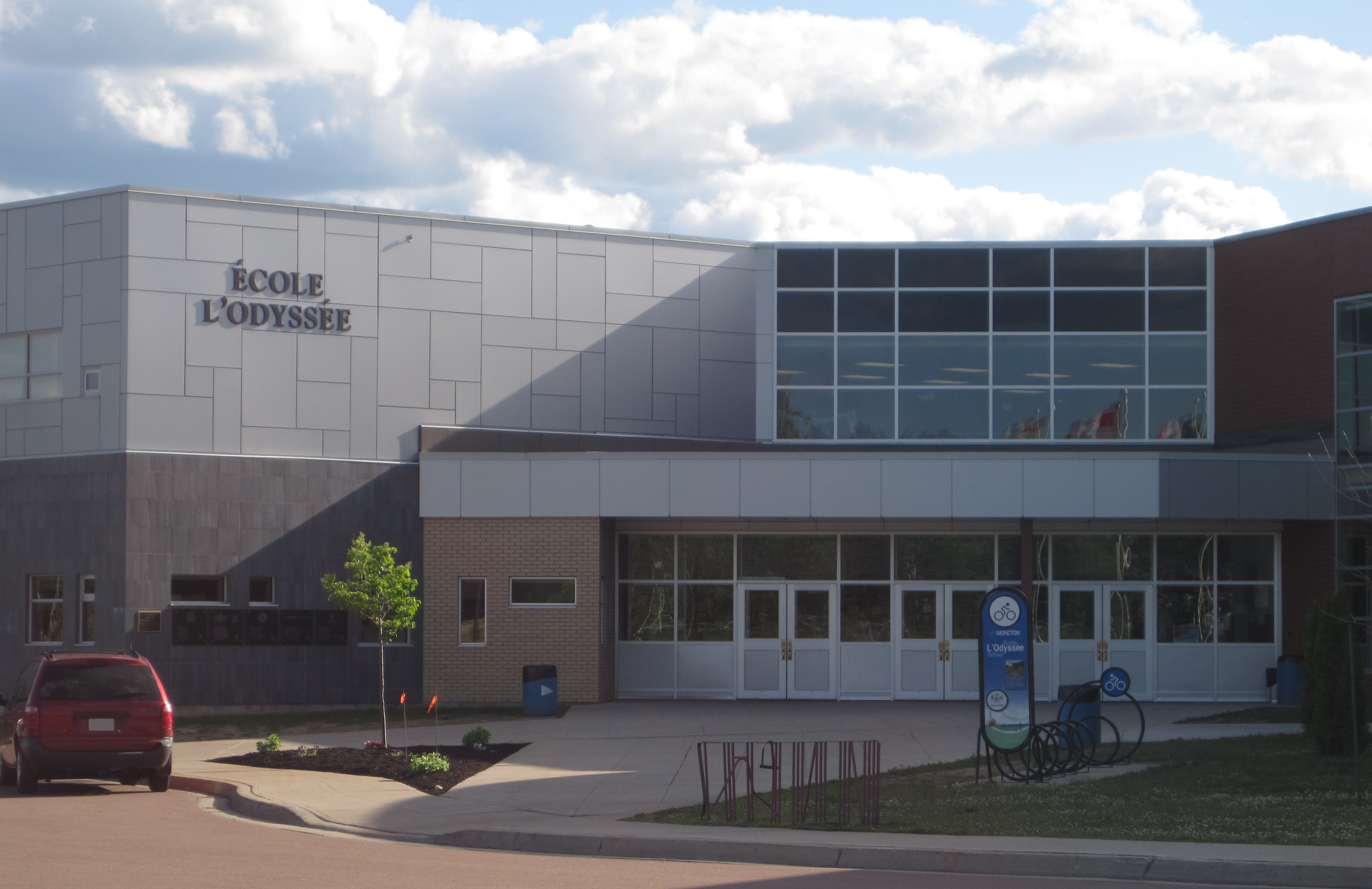
École L'Odyssée

School name	Grades	Location
Centre scolaire Samuel-de-Champlain	K-12	Saint-Jean
École Carrefour Beausoleil	K-12	Miramichi
École Clément-Cormier	9-12	Bouctouche
École L'Odyssée	9-12	Moncton
École Mathieu-Martin	9-12	Dieppe
École Mgr-Marcel-François-Richard	K-12	Saint-Louis-de-Kent
École Régionale de Baie-Sainte-Anne	K-12	Baie-Sainte-Anne
École Sainte-Anne	6-12	Fredericton
Étoile de l'Acadie	K-12	Nouvelle-Arcadie
Polyvalente Louis-J.-Robichaud	9-12	Shediac

== See also ==
- List of schools in New Brunswick
- List of school districts in New Brunswick
