= Anglophone South School District =

School district in New Brunswick, Canada

Location
- 490 Woodward Ave; Saint John, New Brunswick E2K 5N3 Region served: Saint John, Charlotte, Kings counties, New Brunswick Canada

District information
- Type: Public
- Grades: K-12
- Established: 2004
- Superintendent: Derek O’Brien
- Budget: $1.26-Billion (7 school districts combined)

Students and staff
- Students: 23,661
- Teachers: 1,796
- Staff: 139
- Colors: Blue and White

Other information
- Website: asd-s.nbed.nb.ca

The Anglophone South School District (ASD-S) is a public Anglophone school district in the Canadian province of New Brunswick that serves the southern part of the province, covering English-language public schools within the Saint John, Charlotte and Kings counties. The Anglophone South district is the second largest public school district in the province, with a 2022–2023 enrollment of 23,661, along with approximately 1,796 educators. ASD-S has 69 public schools ranging from kindergarten to twelfth grade levels.

Anglophone South is headquartered in Saint John. The district is sub-divided into 3 regions, called "education centres", Hampton (Former District 6), Saint John (Former District 8), and St. Stephen (Former District 10). The current superintendent of the district is Derek O’Brien.

== History ==
In September 2023, the Anglophone South School District introduced the use of six electric school buses, produced by LION, with an additional four being provided at a later date.

== See also ==
- List of school districts in New Brunswick
- List of schools in New Brunswick
