= Anglophone West School District =

School district in New Brunswick, Canada

Location
- Canada

District information
- Type: Public
- Grades: K-12

Other information
- Website: https://asdw.nbed.ca/

Anglophone West is a Canadian school district in New Brunswick.

Anglophone West is an Anglophone district operating 70 public schools (gr. K-12) in York, Carleton, Victoria, Madawaska and Queens counties.

Current enrollment is approximately 24,000 students and 2000 teachers. Anglophone West is headquartered in Fredericton. Anglophone West was created by merging districts 14, 17, and 18.

== See also ==
- List of school districts in New Brunswick
- List of schools in New Brunswick
