= Heron Bay, New Brunswick =

Heron Bay (in English) Baie-des-Hérons (in French)
- Town
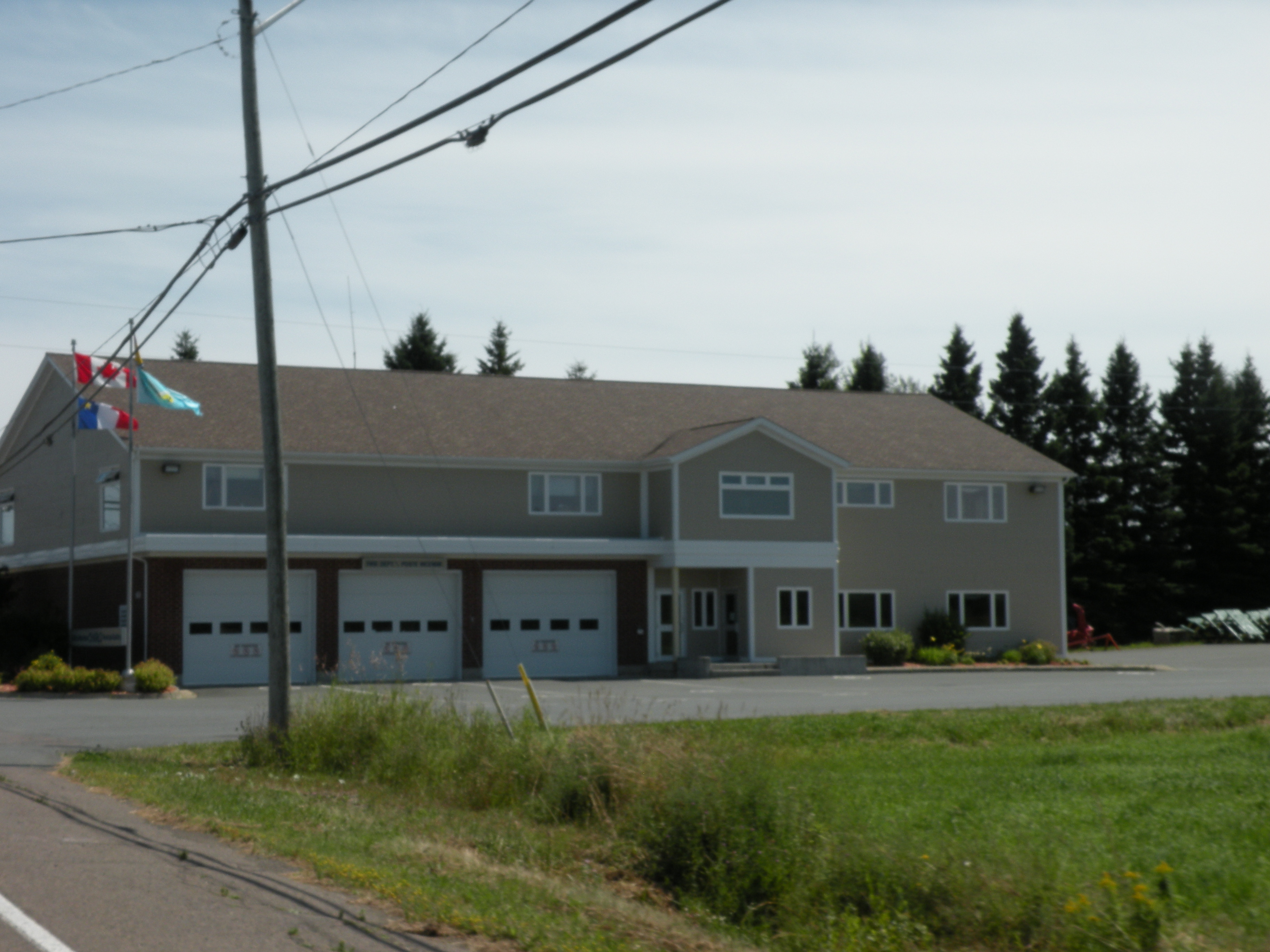
- Former Charlo municipal building

- Location within New Brunswick
- Coordinates: 48.066°N 66.369°W
- Country: Canada
- Province: New Brunswick
- County: Restigouche
- Regional service commission: Restigouche
- Incorporated: January 1, 2023
- Electoral Districts Federal: Madawaska—Restigouche
- Provincial: Restigouche East

Government
  - Type: Town council
  - Mayor: Gail Fearon
- Time zone: UTC-4 (AST)
  - Summer (DST): UTC-3 (ADT)
- Postal code(s): E8C, E8E
- Area code: 506
- Highways: Route 134; Route 275; Route 280; Route 11

Heron Bay (French: Baie-des-Hérons) is a town in the Canadian province of New Brunswick. It was formed through the 2023 New Brunswick local governance reforms.

== History ==
Heron Bay was incorporated on January 1, 2023, via the amalgamation of the former town of Dalhousie and the former village of Charlo as well as the concurrent annexation of adjacent unincorporated areas. The name of the municipality came from a submission by Arron Pelletier. "Heron" refers both to Heron Island, which is within the municipality, and great blue herons, which frequent the area, while "Bay" refers to Chaleur Bay, which is adjacent to the municipality.

== Geography ==
Heron Bay is the most northern point in New Brunswick, and thus is in the Maritime provinces. It is situated in the Restigouche River valley at the tongue of the river where it discharges into Chaleur Bay. The valley lies in a hilly region, part of the Appalachian mountain range, although the Heron Bay town site is situated on a hill side several decameters above sea level with some development to its south on a low ridge of approximately 260 metres elevation. The town is surrounded by salt and fresh water bodies, which are home to many species of wildlife, unique birds, and fish. The area is rich in natural resources.

Heron Bay faces Miguasha, Quebec on the Gaspé Peninsula to the north. The city of Campbellton lies 20 km (12 mi) upriver to the west and the city of Bathurst is approximately 80 km (50 mi) southeast along the shore of Chaleur Bay. There are no major centres south of Heron Bay as this is the undeveloped and heavily forested geographic centre of the province.

== Economy ==
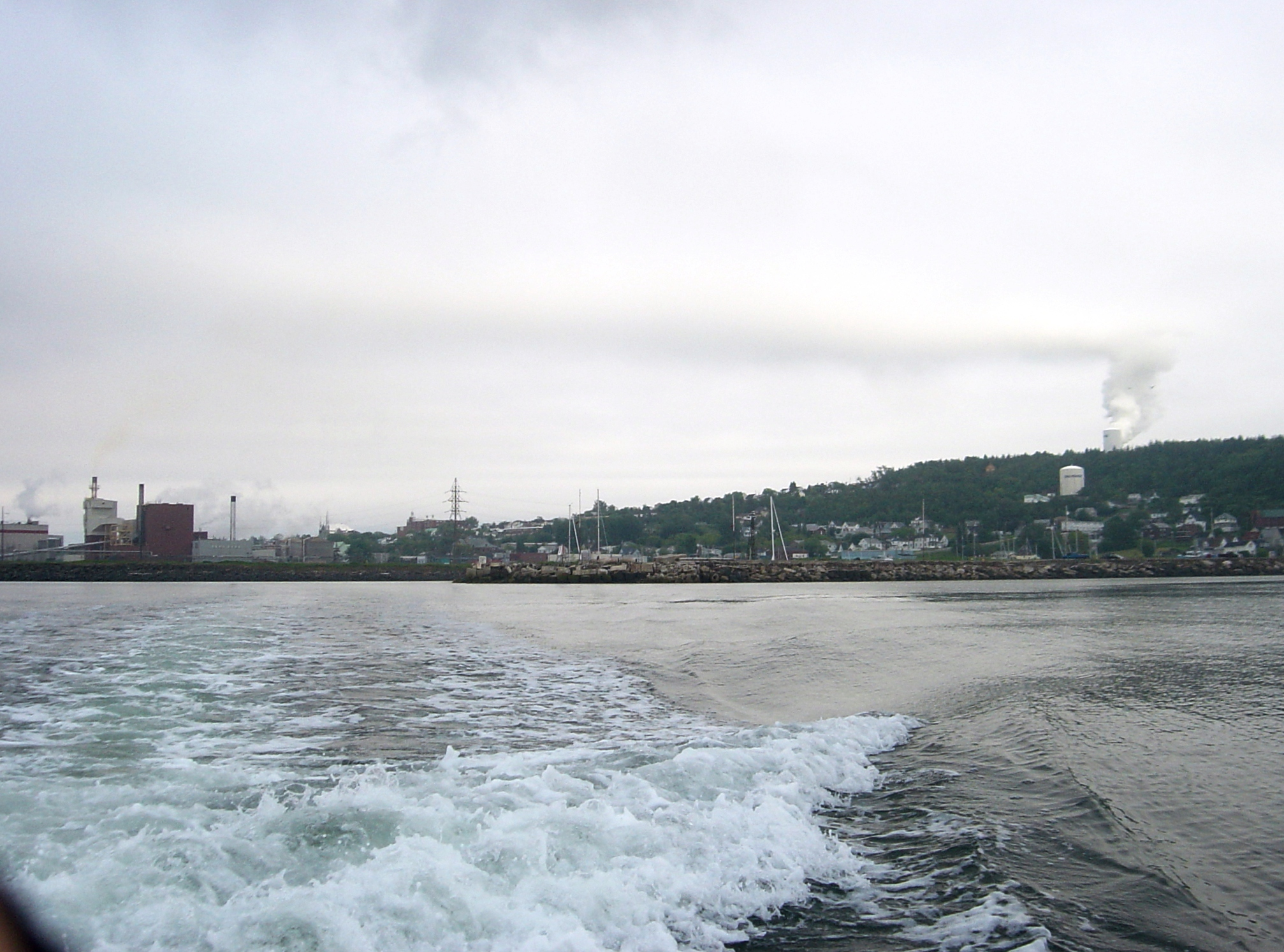
Industrial view of Heron Bay, June 2007

Until 31 January 2008, the economy was dominated by the forestry industry, namely a large pulp and paper mill spanning the waterfront along the Restigouche River. This mill was built to produce newsprint by the New Brunswick International Paper Co. in 1928 (a subsidiary of International Paper). Dalhousie was prosperous for many decades due to the mill and the employment opportunities it created.

The mill underwent ownership changes in 1980, when Oji Paper Co. Ltd. and Mitsui & Co. of Japan purchased 33 per cent of the mill. They grouped it under the name Canadian International Paper. In 1991, it was purchased by Canadian Pacific Limited, who grouped it under their Canadian Pacific Forest Products subsidiary. The mill changed hands again in 1994, when CPFP changed to become Avenor Inc. In 1998 Bowater purchased the Dalhousie newsprint mill, and it was renamed "Bowater Maritimes Inc.".

The 2007 merger of Bowater and Abitibi Consolidated resulted in the decision by the newly merged company to announce the closure of the Dalhousie newsprint mill on 29 November 2007 due to apparent market conditions. The mill, which had produced 640 tonnes of newsprint per day for shipment by rail, truck and ship to domestic and international markets, was officially closed on 31 January 2008. Consequently, the economy of the town of Dalhousie is facing uncertainty during the post-industrial adjustment. Due to the closure of this mill, hundreds were left without work in the local economy and some were forced to move. The mill has since been completely demolished.

Following the closure of the pulp and paper mill in 2008, Pioneer Chemicals closed a processing plant on the western edge of the town. As a result of the closures of these industries, the New Brunswick East Coast Railway and its subsequent owner CN Rail announced that it was declaring the railway spur into the town surplus. However, a deal was struck between CN and the Port of Dalhousie for this section of line to remain open under a leasing agreement in November 2011.

The only industry that remained was the generating station, but it was decommissioned in 2012 and demolished in 2015 after one more failed attempt.

While there are several smaller employers, the largest employer in the town currently is the Dalhousie Nursing Home.

== Transportation ==
The town benefits from its geography by having a deep sea port, which is ice-free year round. The administration of the port was privatised in 2006, as the result of the federal government's divestiture programme. The port is located on the south shore of the Bay of Chaleur at the mouth of the Restigouche River, and includes 98 acres (40 hectares) of land, 494 acres (200 hectares) of "waterlot," and two cargo facilities—East Bay Marine Terminal, whose chief cargo is paper, and the West Wharf, which imports petroleum and coal and exports ore concentrates. Berth depths range from 9.7 to 10.3 meters (32 to 34 ft). The port is located adjacent to the now-demolished pulp and paper mill. The east wharf can handle 340m vessels with maximum draught at low tide of 9.1m, and has indoor storage facilities of 1ha, while the west wharf handles vessels of up to 355m with draught 10.3m.

It is also served by the New Brunswick East Coast Railway and is located on the Highway 11 arterial highway. Via Rail Canada provides passenger train service three days per week with stops at Charlo immediately east of the town and in Campbellton to the west.

The Charlo Airport is located several kilometres east of the town for private and charter service with scheduled air service available at the Bathurst Airport.

== Education ==
Heron Bay has two elementary schools (Académie Notre-Dame and L.E. Reinsborough), and two high schools (Dalhousie Regional High School and École Aux quatre vents).

== Climate ==
Heron Bay has a humid continental climate. In spite of its marine position, this climate regime is typical of New Brunswick and is manifested by vast differences in temperature between the warm summers and the cold snowy winters.

Climate data for Heron Bay
Month	Jan	Feb	Mar	Apr	May	Jun	Jul	Aug	Sep	Oct	Nov	Dec	Year
Mean daily maximum °C (°F)	−7 (19)	−6 (21)	0 (32)	6 (42)	13 (55)	19 (66)	22 (71)	21 (69)	17 (62)	10 (50)	2 (35)	−3 (26)	8 (46)
Mean daily minimum °C (°F)	−18 (0)	−16 (3)	−10 (14)	−3 (26)	2 (35)	8 (46)	11 (51)	11 (51)	7 (44)	1 (33)	−4 (24)	−12 (10)	−2 (28)
Average precipitation mm (inches)	76 (3.0)	69 (2.7)	66 (2.6)	46 (1.8)	61 (2.4)	76 (3.0)	84 (3.3)	76 (3.0)	69 (2.7)	74 (2.9)	71 (2.8)	69 (2.7)	840 (32.9)
Source: Weatherbase

== Infrastructure ==
The Charlo Airport, the only airport in the region, offered scheduled air service between 1963 and 2001. In October 2012, Provincial Airlines began trial flights at the Charlo Airport. In January 2013, after deeming that there was sufficient demand, they made the trial flights permanent. They currently provide direct flights between Heron Bay, New Brunswick and Wabush, Newfoundland and Halifax, Nova Scotia.

== Notable people ==
- Guy Arseneault, teacher and politician
- Joseph Cunard Barberie, politician
- Joel Bernard, politician
- Gordie Dwyer, hockey player and coach
- Kate Simpson Hayes, writer
- Charles H. LaBillois, politician and merchant
- Allan Maher, businessman and politician
- Marie-Jo Pelletier, alternate captain for the Buffalo Beauts
- Linda Silas, nurse and trade unionist

== See also ==
- List of communities in New Brunswick
- List of municipalities in New Brunswick
