= New Brunswick School District 05 =

Canadian school district

District scolaire 05 (or School District 05) was a Canadian school district in New Brunswick.

District 05 was a Francophone district operating 22 public schools (gr. K-12) in Gloucester and Restigouche counties.

Current enrollment is approximately 5,930 students and 400 teachers. District 05 was headquartered in Campbellton.

On February 24, 2012, the Department of Education and Early Childhood Development changes the province districts from 14 to 7 districts. The School District 05 is now a part of, but not limited to, the northeast district: Campbellton, Bathurst and Acadian Peninsula regions (nine sub-districts).

== List of schools ==
=== High schools ===
- École Aux quatre vents
- École Secondaire Népisiguit
- Polyvalante Roland-Pépin

=== Middle schools ===
- Le Domaine-Étudiant
- Place-des-Jeunes

=== Elementary schools ===
- Apollo-XI
- Assomption
- Cité-de-l'Amitié
- La Découverte-de-Saint-Sauveur
- Le Coin-des-Amis
- Le Rendez-vous-des-Jeunes
- Le Tournesol
- Mgr-Melanson

=== Combined elementary and middle schools ===
- Arthur-Pinet
- Carrefour-Étudiant
- François-Xavier-Daigle
- La Croisée de Robertville
- Le Domaine-des-Copains
- Notre-Dame
- Séjour-Jeunesse
- Versant-Nord

=== Other schools ===
- Centre d'apprentissage communautaire (École Aux quatre vents)
- Centre d'apprentissage communautaire (Polyvalente Roland-Pépin)
- Centre d'apprentissage communautaire (École Secondaire Népisiguit)
