= New Brunswick School District 15 =

Canadian School District

School District 15 is a Canadian school district in New Brunswick.

District 15 is an Anglophone district operating 14 public schools (gr. K-12) in Restigouche and Gloucester Counties.

Current enrollment is approximately 4,000 students and 280 teachers. District 15 is headquartered in Dalhousie.

== List of schools ==
=== High schools ===
- Bathurst High School
- Dalhousie Regional High School
- Sugarloaf Senior High School

=== Middle schools ===
- Campbellton Middle School
- Dalhousie Middle School
- Superior Middle School

=== Elementary schools ===
- Janeville Elementary School
- L.E. Reinsborough School
- Lord Beaverbrook School
- Parkwood Elementary School
- Terry Fox Elementary School
- Tide Head School

=== Combined elementary and middle schools ===
- Belledune School
- Jacquet River School

=== Other schools ===
- Bathurst Learning Center
- Campbellton Learning Center
- Dalhousie Learning Center
