= Malcolm Ross (school teacher) =

Canadian schoolteacher and Holocaust denier

- Born: May 1946 (age 80); Winnipeg, Manitoba, Canada
- Education: University of New Brunswick
- Occupations: Author, former schoolteacher

Malcolm Ross (born May 1946) is a Canadian former schoolteacher from Moncton, New Brunswick, who became notable for his antisemitic writings, including Holocaust denial.

== Early life ==
Malcolm Ross was born in May, 1946, in Winnipeg, Manitoba. His father was a Presbyterian minister. The family moved to Newcastle, New Brunswick, when Ross was young, and he graduated from high school there. In 1968, he graduated from the University of New Brunswick with a Bachelor of Education. In 1976, Ross began teaching at Magnetic Hill School.

== Published books ==
In 1978, he published his first book titled, Web of Deceit. In the book, Ross attacked the diary of Anne Frank and declared the Holocaust a hoax. In 1983, Ross published a book titled, The Real Holocaust: The Attack on Unborn Children and Life Itself, which combined anti-abortion views with antisemitism and holocaust denial. In 1988, he published Spectre of Power, which spoke of his experiences with critics.

== Human rights complaint ==
In 1991, a local Jewish parent, David Attis, filed a human rights complaint against Ross's employers, New Brunswick School District 15, on the grounds that Ross's continued employment created a poisoned environment for Jewish students (including Attis's daughter, who, although not a student at Magnetic Hill School where Ross taught, had been intimidated out of attending interscholastic activities at Magnetic Hill).

After a lengthy hearing, during which Ross was represented by Doug Christie, the human rights board of inquiry ordered the District to remove Ross from the classroom, and to terminate his employment unless Ross's school could find a non-teaching position for him (and in fact, he was made the school librarian). In addition, the District warned Ross that, if he continued to publish or distribute antisemitic literature, his non-teaching position would be terminated as well. Attis was not awarded any damages.

The New Brunswick Court of Appeal subsequently ruled that these decisions were in violation of Ross's rights to freedom of religion and freedom of expression, and overturned the District's orders.

However, in 1996, the Supreme Court of Canada ruled that Ross's removal from the classroom was justifiable, on the grounds that, although it did constitute a violation of his freedoms, this was a reasonable limit, as schoolteachers must be held to a higher standard of behaviour. The Court further ruled that the District's "gag order" (that Ross be dismissed from his non-teaching position should he continue to publish and distribute antisemitic material) was invalid.

In 2000, Ross' application to the UN Human Rights Committee was rejected, stating that "the removal of the author from a teaching position can be considered a restriction necessary to protect the right and freedom of Jewish children to have a school system free from bias, prejudice and intolerance".

== Defamation action ==
In 1998, Ross filed a defamation lawsuit against Josh Beutel, an editorial cartoonist for the Telegraph-Journal, who had compared Ross to Joseph Goebbels. The Court of Queen's Bench of New Brunswick ruled that, as Nazism was an anti-religious philosophy, and Ross was profoundly religious, Ross's extreme degree of antisemitism could not fairly be labeled as Nazistic. The Queen's Bench ordered Beutel to pay Ross $7,500 in damages. However, in 2000, the New Brunswick Court of Appeal overturned this decision.
