= Terry Fox Elementary School =

== Schools named "Terry Fox Elementary School" ==
- Terry Fox Elementary School (Abbotsford, BC)
- Terry Fox Elementary School (Barrie, ON)
- Terry Fox Elementary (Pierrefonds, QC)
- Terry Fox Elementary School (Bathurst, New Brunswick)
