= Ross v New Brunswick School District No 15 =

- Supreme Court of Canada

Hearing: October 31, 1995 Judgment: April 3, 1996
- Full case name: Malcolm Ross v New Brunswick School District No 15
- Citations: [1996] 1 S.C.R. 825
- Docket No.: 24002
- Prior history: Judgment for Ross in the Court of Appeal for New Brunswick.
- Ruling: The appeal should be allowed.

Court membership
- Chief Justice: Antonio Lamer; Puisne Justices: Gérard La Forest, Claire L'Heureux-Dubé, John Sopinka, Charles Gonthier, Peter Cory, Beverley McLachlin, Frank Iacobucci, John C. Major

Reasons given
- Unanimous reasons by: La Forest J.

Ross v New Brunswick School District No 15 [1996] 1 S.C.R. 825, is a Supreme Court of Canada decision.

== Background ==
Malcolm Ross is a former Canadian schoolteacher in Moncton, New Brunswick.

In 1988, a local Jewish parent, David Attis, filed a human rights complaint against Ross's employers, New Brunswick School District 15, on the grounds that Ross's continued employment created a poisoned environment for Jewish students (including Attis's daughter, who, although not a student at Magnetic Hill School where Ross taught, had been intimidated out of attending interscholastic activities at Magnetic Hill).

After a lengthy hearing, during which Ross was represented by Doug Christie, the human rights commission ordered the District to remove Ross from the classroom, and to terminate his employment unless Ross's school could find a non-teaching position for him (and in fact, he was made the school librarian). In addition, the District warned Ross that, if he continued to publish or distribute antisemitic literature, his non-teaching position would be terminated as well. Attis was not awarded any damages.

The New Brunswick Court of Appeal subsequently ruled that these decisions were in violation of Ross's rights to freedom of religion and freedom of expression, and overturned the District's orders.

== Ruling ==
The Supreme Court of Canada ruled that Ross's removal from the classroom was justifiable, on the grounds that, although it did constitute a violation of his freedoms, this was a reasonable limit, as schoolteachers must be held to a higher standard of behaviour. The Court further ruled that the District's "gag order" (that Ross be dismissed from his non-teaching position should he continue to publish and distribute antisemitic material) was invalid.

== Aftermath ==
In 1998, Ross filed a defamation lawsuit against Josh Beutel, an editorial cartoonist for the Telegraph-Journal, who had compared Ross to Joseph Goebbels; the Court of Queen's Bench of New Brunswick ruled that, as Nazism was an anti-religious philosophy, and Ross was profoundly religious, Ross's extreme degree of antisemitism could not fairly be labeled as Nazistic. Beutel was ordered to pay Ross $7500 in damages. However, a 2000 appeal overturned this decision.

In 2000, Ross' appeal to the UN Human Rights Committee was rejected, stating that "the removal of the author from a teaching position can be considered a restriction necessary to protect the right and freedom of Jewish children to have a school system free from bias, prejudice and intolerance".
