= Chipman Airport =

Chipman Airport may refer to:

- Chipman Airport (Alberta), in Alberta, Canada
- Chipman Airport (New Brunswick) in New Brunswick, Canada
