= Campbellton, New Brunswick =

City in New Brunswick, Canada

Campbellton
- City
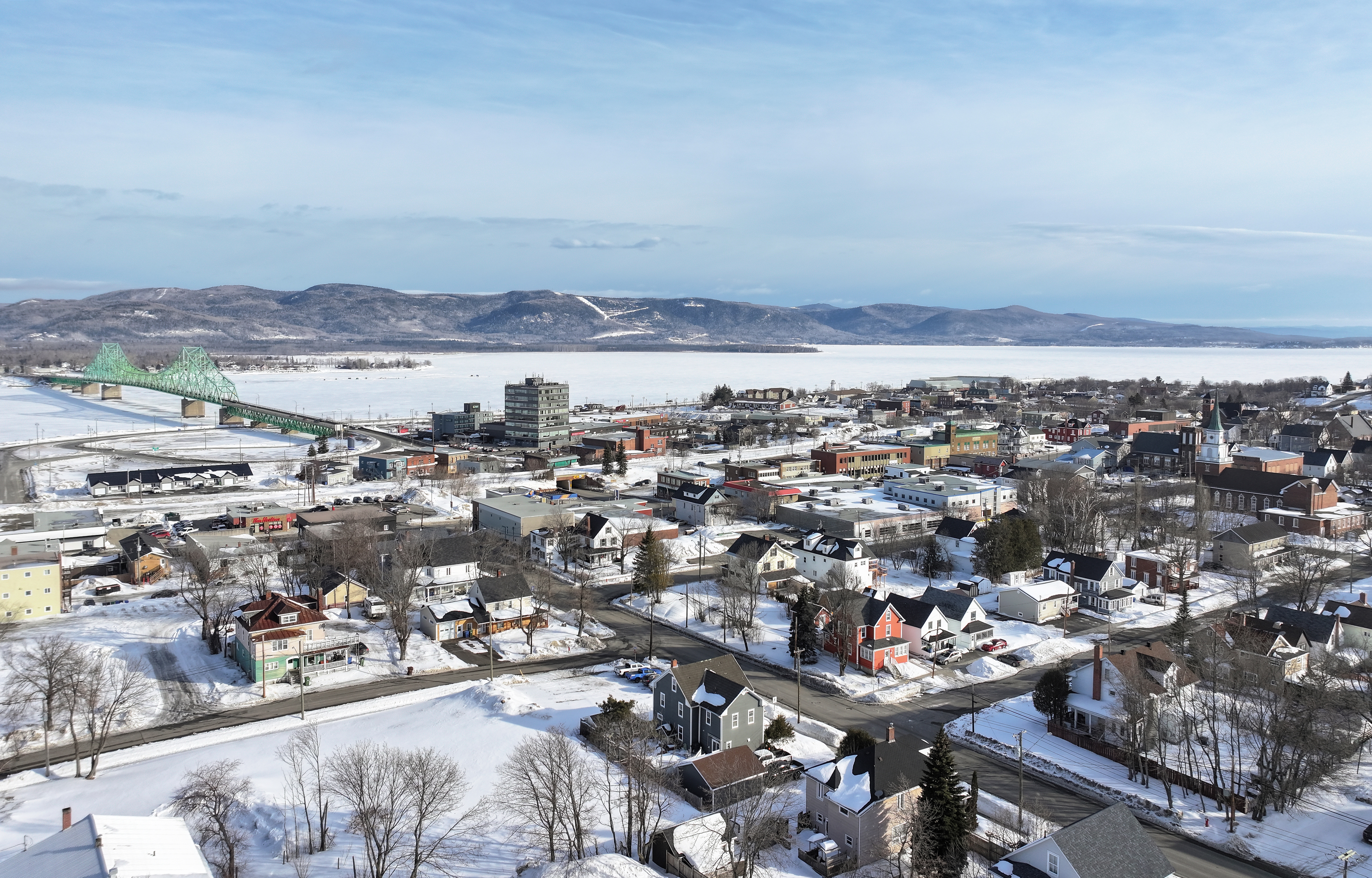
- Centre Ville

- Seal
- Nickname: "The City of Two Coasts"
- Location within New Brunswick
- Coordinates: 48.005°N 66.673056°W
- Country: Canada
- Province: New Brunswick
- County: Restigouche
- Parish: Addington
- Founded: 1837
- Town Status: 1889
- City Status: 1958
- Electoral Districts; Federal: Madawaska—Restigouche
- Provincial: Campbellton-Dalhousie

Government
  - Type: City Council
  - Mayor: Michel Soucy
  - CAO: Manon Cloutier

Area
  - City: 18.57 km^{2} (7.17 sq mi)
  - Urban: 17.80 km^{2} (6.87 sq mi)
  - Metro: 1,090.49 km^{2} (421.04 sq mi)
- Highest elevation: 148 m (486 ft)
- Lowest elevation: 0 m (0 ft)

Population (2021)
  - City: 7,047
  - Density: 379.5/km^{2} (983/sq mi)
  - Urban: 8,833
  - Urban density: 496.1/km^{2} (1,285/sq mi)
  - Metro: 11,986
  - Metro density: 4.2/km^{2} (11/sq mi)
  - Change (2016-21): ▲2.4%
  - Dwellings: 3,531
- Demonym: Campbelltonian
- Time zone: UTC−4 (AST)
  - Summer (DST): UTC−3 (ADT)
- Postal code(s): E3N: 0A2, 0B1; 1A1-1A4, 1A6-1A9, 1B1-1C7, 1C9, 1E1-1E5, 1E7-1E9, 1G1-1G9, 1H1-1H2, 1H6-1H9, 1J1-1J8, 1K4-1K9, 1L2-1L9, 1M1-1M2, 1M4-1M5, 1M7-1M8, 1N1-1N9, 1P3-1P9, 1R1-1R9, 1S1-1S4, 1S8-1S9, 1T1-1T9, 1V1-1V5, 1V7-1V9, 1W1-1W9, 1X1-1X9, 1Y1-1Y9, 1Z1-1Z9; 2A1-2A9, 2B1-2B9, 2C1-2C7, 2C9, 2E1-2E9, 2G1-2G9, 2H1-2H9, 2J1, 2J3-2J9, 2K1-2K9, 2L1-2L9, 2M1-2M9, 2N1-2N3, 2P1, 2P3-2P4, 2P7-2P9, 2R1-2R9, 2S1-2S5, 2S7-2S9, 2T1-2T3, 2T5-2T7, 2T9, 2V1-2V9, 2W1-2W7, 2W9, 2X1-2X9, 2Y1-2Y9, 2Z1-2Z9; 3A1-3A9, 3B1-3B7, 3C1-3C9, 3E9, 3G1-3G2, 3G4, 3G7, 3G9, 3H1-3H8, 3J1-3J7, 3J9, 3K1-3K3, 3K5-3K9, 3L1-3L9, 3M1-3M9, 3N1-3N9, 3P1-3P9, 3R1-3R3, 3S1, 3S4-3S5, 3S8-3S9, 3T1-3T9, 3V1-3V8, 3W7-3W9, 3X1-3X3, 3X5-3X9, 3Y1, 3Y3-3Y9, 3Z1; 4P7, 4R9; 5B1, 5B4-5B6, 5B8-5B9, 5C1, 5E8
- Area code: 506
- Highways: Route 134; Route 11
- Median Income*: $42,130 CDN
- Website: nbcampbellton.ca
- Median total household income, 2015 (all households)

Campbellton is a city in Restigouche County, New Brunswick, Canada.

Situated on the south bank of the Restigouche River opposite Pointe-à-la-Croix, Quebec, Campbellton was officially incorporated in 1889 and achieved city status in 1958.

Forestry and tourism are major industries in the regional economy, while a pulp mill in the Campbellton community of Atholville is the largest single employer in the area. As part of the tourism "industry", wealthy sportfishermen seeking Atlantic salmon flock to the scenic Restigouche Valley every summer. The region sees extensive annual snowfall. Alpine and Nordic ski facilities at Sugarloaf Provincial Park provide winter recreation opportunities for both visitors and local residents. Campbellton is also a local retail and service centre.

On 1 January 2023, Campbellton amalgamated with the villages of Atholville and Tide Head, the local service district (LSD) of Glencoe and parts of four other LSDs; its new population was estimated at 12,000 using 2021 census data. The names of the amalgamated communities remain in official use.

== History ==
The area around the site of the present city was settled by French people circa 1700 with a trading post based upon fishing and fur trading with the Mi'gmaq. More settlers arrived here when Ile St. Jean was lost to the French as the result of the capitulation of Louisbourg in 1758. The area has had numerous names over the centuries: originally called Wisiamkik (muddy spot) by the Mi'kmaq who inhabited the region, it was then named Pointe-des-Sauvages by the French in 1700 and subsequently Pointe-Rochelle, Cavenik's Point, Kavanagh's Point, Quiton's Point and Martin's Point, before settling in 1833 with its current name in honour of Lieutenant-Governor Sir Archibald Campbell.

=== Battle of the Restigouche ===
It was here that the Battle of the Restigouche, the final naval battle between the English and French for the possession of North America during the Seven Years' War, was waged in 1760. It marked a turning point for the settlement. Robert Ferguson and the development of Campbellton and Atholville owed their development to the enterprising immigrants from Scotland. In 1769, only nine years after the Battle of Restigouche, Scotsman Hugh Baillie and a partner set up a fur and salted salmon business on the site that would become Campbellton. The business was sold to London merchant John Shoolbred, who in 1773 established the first British settlement on the Restigouche. His agent, William Smith, brought over eight Scottish fishermen from Aberdeen, Scotland, to work for him. Two of these fishermen were John Duncan and Robert Adams, who brought their families with them as well. These two fishermen devoted themselves to the salmon fishing industry at Old Church Point, today Atholville. In 1794, a Scotsman from Perth named Alexander Ferguson settled in Martin's Point (Campbellton), where his brother Robert joined him two years later.

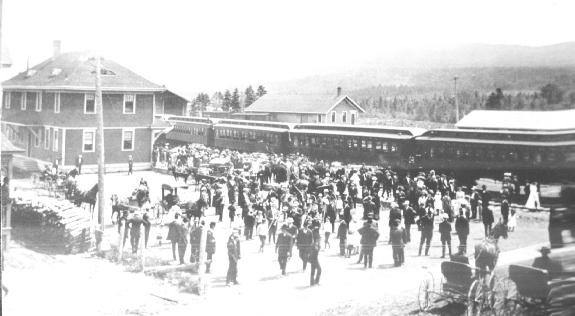
Old Intercolonial Railway Station in Campbellton

=== From settlement to town ===
Considered the founder of Restigouche County, Robert Ferguson established his control over the development of northern New Brunswick during the first half of the 19th century. In 1803, Ferguson inherited his brother's business and quickly became the largest merchant and exporter of fish in Restigouche. Until the 1840s, he shipped between 1,200 and 1,400 barrels of salted salmon per year. He became the most important landowner in the region. He also operated a flour mill and a sawmill and exported hewn wood. He even constructed his own boats in the village that now bears the name of Atholville. In 1812, he built an impressive residence there that he named Athol House in memory of his native region of Scotland.

In 1875, the advent of the Intercolonial Railway, and a permanent railway station in 1876, had a strong impact on Campbellton. Its population increased rapidly, reaching 1,800 in 1891, and development of the settlement shifted westward. In 1889, Campbellton was incorporated as a town, and in the late 1880s, an Hôtel Dieu was founded by the Religious Hospitallers of St. Joseph, an order that established hospitals and schools in many towns in Canada.

=== The Great Fire ===
On 11 July 1910, a disastrous fire sparked by a sawmill on the waterfront destroyed a large portion of the town. The fire was spread throughout the town by flaming shingles. Prior to the fire its population was approaching 4,000 citizens and help came from near and far to provide food and supplies in order to come to their aid. Most of the people had to live in tents while plans to rebuild were being prepared. Campbellton was subsequently rebuilt. In the months and years following the fire, many of the new (now historic) buildings were constructed of brick as Water Street had been designated a "Fire District" where all new buildings had to be built with fireproof exterior walls.

=== Growth of the City ===
Following the fire, the railway station was moved to Roseberry St. and helped to define Campbellton in its early years. The town was bidding to become the leading commercial center in the North Shore and had three banks, five churches, two schools, 6 hotels and a hospital by the 1920s. At this time Campbellton was seeing upwards of 16 trains a day at the Central Station. In 1928, a pulp mill was built in nearby Atholville which continued to propel the population growth already being experienced. Campbellton was experiencing strong growth as the population grew at a steady rate: 3,817 in 1911, 5,570 in 1921, 6,505 in 1931, 6,714 in 1941, 9,257 in 1949. In 1951, Campbellton opened its new arena, the Memorial Gardens, with an exhibition game featuring the Montreal Canadiens.

In 1958, Campbellton was incorporated as a City and its population was approaching 13,000. At this time the construction of the J.C. Van Horne Interprovincial bridge commenced which was designed to facilitate travel between Quebec and Northern New Brunswick. The bridge was completed in 1961 and allowed the cross-river town of Pointe-à-la-Croix to fully integrate itself commercially with the City of Campbellton. The Salmon Festival was inaugurated in 1967 and has been a popular annual week-long event which is enjoyed by tourists and residents alike. Campbellton's city limits were expanded in 1979 when the Richardsville area became part of the city.

=== Esplanade Restigouche ===
In 2009, Mayor Bruce MacIntosh and Council made significant progress towards restoring the tourism industry in the area and in improving the city's waterfront. They announced that the long-awaited "Esplanade Restigouche" development would finally move forward. This is a three phased project, that began in 2011, that will significantly upgrade the already picturesque waterfront and further cement Campbellton's place as a tourist destination. The Restigouche River Experience Center has been constructed with a Restigouche River Museum and an 86 site RV Park which will help Campbellton in becoming the hub for regional experiential tourism. In 2016, the newly elected mayor, Stephanie Anglehart-Paulin and Council have decided to move towards developing the Atlantic Culinary Institute in conjunction with the CCNB.

=== Fire Ship ===
The history of the City of Campbellton is not complete without mentioning the infamous Phantom Ship known as "Fireship of Baie des Chaleurs". Stories of its appearance include seeing a burning sailing vessel, sometimes a vessel with all its sails set scudding along the water or sometimes a ball of fire or burning vessel on the water's surface or fading out of sight. This is not frequently seen. Some believe it is a ghost ship from the Battle of the Restigouche whereas others believe it is merely caused by heat waves, reflections or hallucinations.

== Geography ==
Campbellton is 20 km (12 mi) upstream (west) from the mouth of the Bay des Chaleurs Dalhousie and approximately 100 km (62 mi) northwest of Bathurst. The city is approximately 160 km (99 mi) northeast of St. Leonard in the St. John River valley and approximately the same distance from Mont-Joli, Quebec in the Saint Lawrence River valley. Campbellton was settled by the Scottish including surrounding area like Balmoral, Glencoe, and Glenlevit.

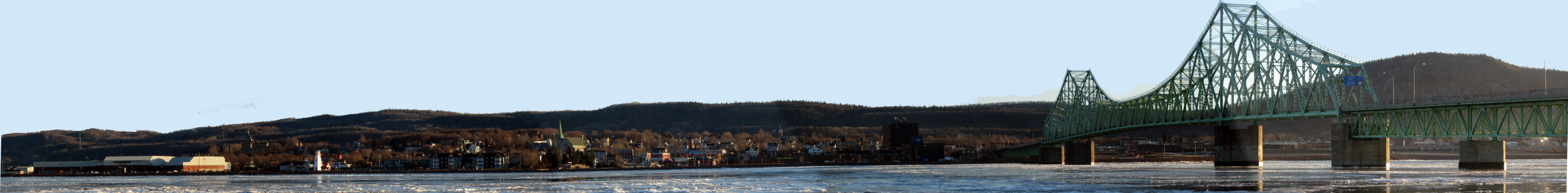
Campbellton Skyline - Eastern portion of the downtown area from the City Centre to the Memorial Civic Centre. Sugarloaf Mountain peeks out to the west of the J.C. Van Horne Bridge (right side of photo).

=== Climate ===
Campbellton has a cold, wet and snowy humid continental climate (Dfb) with vast seasonal temperature differences, although summers are somewhat moderated by its proximity to the cold waters of the Gulf of Saint Lawrence. Moderation is nearly non-existent in winter, as prevailing wind from the interior cause temperatures to often plummet below −20 °C (−4 °F).

Climate data for Campbellton
| Month | Jan | Feb | Mar | Apr | May | Jun | Jul | Aug | Sep | Oct | Nov | Dec | Year |
|---|---|---|---|---|---|---|---|---|---|---|---|---|---|
| Record high °C (°F) | 12.5 (54.5) | 14.5 (58.1) | 19.4 (66.9) | 29.4 (84.9) | 32.8 (91.0) | 33.5 (92.3) | 35.6 (96.1) | 34.4 (93.9) | 32.8 (91.0) | 26.7 (80.1) | 19.5 (67.1) | 13.9 (57.0) | 35.6 (96.1) |
| Mean daily maximum °C (°F) | −8.8 (16.2) | −6.9 (19.6) | −0.2 (31.6) | 6.9 (44.4) | 15.4 (59.7) | 21.1 (70.0) | 23.5 (74.3) | 22.4 (72.3) | 16.4 (61.5) | 9.5 (49.1) | 1.8 (35.2) | −5.5 (22.1) | 8.0 (46.3) |
| Mean daily minimum °C (°F) | −20.1 (−4.2) | −19.2 (−2.6) | −11.9 (10.6) | −3.8 (25.2) | 2 (36) | 7.6 (45.7) | 10.7 (51.3) | 9.7 (49.5) | 4.8 (40.6) | 0 (32) | −5.9 (21.4) | −15.1 (4.8) | −3.4 (25.9) |
| Record low °C (°F) | −42.8 (−45.0) | −41.7 (−43.1) | −36.5 (−33.7) | −28 (−18) | −12.8 (9.0) | −6 (21) | −0.6 (30.9) | −2 (28) | −7.8 (18.0) | −14 (7) | −27.2 (−17.0) | −40 (−40) | −42.8 (−45.0) |
| Average precipitation mm (inches) | 73 (2.9) | 55 (2.2) | 69 (2.7) | 70 (2.8) | 83 (3.3) | 91 (3.6) | 121 (4.8) | 109 (4.3) | 92 (3.6) | 91 (3.6) | 85 (3.3) | 87 (3.4) | 1,026 (40.4) |
Source: The Weather Network

== Demographics ==
In the 2021 Census of Population conducted by Statistics Canada, Campbellton had a population of 7,047 living in 3,254 of its 3,531 total private dwellings, a change of 2.4% from its 2016 population of 6,883. With a land area of 18.57 km^{2} (7.17 sq mi), it had a population density of 379.5/km^{2} (982.9/sq mi) in 2021.

Historical Census Data - Campbellton, New Brunswick

| Year | Pop. | ±% |
|---|---|---|
| 1901 | 2,652 | — |
| 1911 | 3,817 | +43.9% |
| 1921 | 5,570 | +45.9% |
| 1931 | 6,505 | +16.8% |
| 1941 | 6,748 | +3.7% |
| 1951 | 7,754 | +14.9% |
| 1956 | 8,389 | +8.2% |

| Year | Pop. | ±% |
|---|---|---|
| 1961 | 9,873 | +17.7% |
| 1966 | 10,175 | +3.1% |
| 1971 | 10,335 | +1.6% |
| 1976 | 9,282 | −10.2% |
| 1981 | 9,818 | +5.8% |
| 1986 | 9,073 | −7.6% |
| 1991 | 8,699 | −4.1% |

| Year | Pop. | ±% |
|---|---|---|
| 1996 | 8,404 | −3.4% |
| 2001 | 7,798 | −7.2% |
| 2006 | 7,384 | −5.3% |
| 2011 | 7,385 | +0.0% |
| 2016 | 6,883 | −6.8% |
| 2021 | 7,047 | +2.4% |

=== Language ===
Canadian Census - Mother Tongue - Campbellton, New Brunswick
| Census | Total | French | | | English | | | French & English | | | Other | | |
| Year | Responses | Count | Trend | Pop % | Count | Trend | Pop % | Count | Trend | Pop % | Count | Trend | Pop % |
| 2021 | 6,625 | 3,335 | ▼1.77% | 50.34% | 2,805 | ▲1.81% | 42.34% | 280 | ▲75.00% | 4.23% | 195 | ▲30% | 4.23% |
| 2016 | 6,460 | 3,395 | ▼6.73% | 52.59% | 2,755 | ▼7.24% | 42.68% | 160 | ▼17.95% | 2.48% | 150 | ▲11.11% | 2.94% |
| 2011 | 6,945 | 3,640 | ▼5.94% | 52.41% | 2,970 | ▲4.58% | 42.76% | 195 | ▲56.00% | 2.81% | 135 | ▲3.85% | 1.94% |
| 2006 | 6,965 | 3,870 | — | 55.56% | 2,840 | — | 40.78% | 125 | — | 1.79% | 130 | — | 1.87% |

| Evolution of Mother Tongue (in %) | Key |
|---|---|
| | English French English and French Other |

== Arts and culture ==
Riverside Park - Campbellton

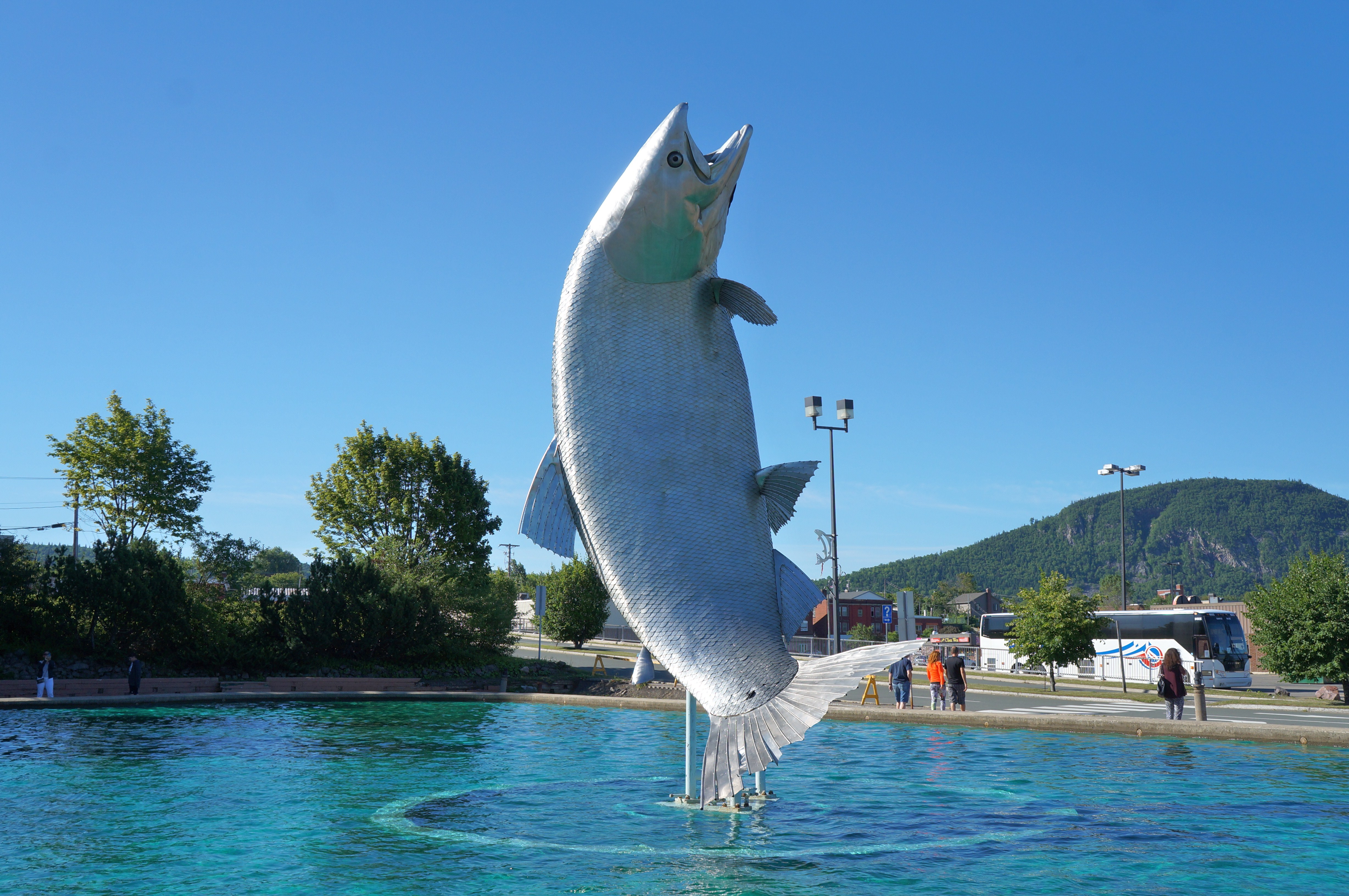
Statue of Restigouche Sam

The Restigouche Caledonian Society has been in Campbellton since 1898, the society was formed for the purpose of offering relief and assistance to distressed Scotsmen. The First President of the society was also The First Mayor of Campbellton John McAlister. To display the history of the city and the battle of the Restigouche, Riverside Park is home to two cannons used in the battle; one with three fleurs-de-lys on the barrel and the other with what appears to be stylized anchors. These are French naval guns from a five gun battery erected during the battle at Battery Point on the Quebec side of the river. When the Busteed family received a land grant at Battery Point, circa 1790, they found at least three cannons at the old battery site. One cannon was built into the fireplace of their home, called Bordeaux House, and two others were given to relatives across the river at Athol House in Atholville. For many years the two cannons outside Athol House were fired on ceremonial occasions. After Athol House burned, the guns lay on the riverbank until donated to the City of Campbellton in 1898. The park also features two monuments donated to the City displaying the names of local soldiers who died in battle during World War I and World War II.

The Restigouche Gallery is local gallery and functions as a centre in the cultural program of the region. It has been host to major exhibitions from the N.B. Museum on a travelling basis in hopes that the gallery will eventually join the Atlantic Provinces Art Circuit as a participatory member. The gallery displays a tricultural permanent exhibition highlighting the cultural strength of the region bringing to the forefront Campbellton's diverse roots through its heritage Mi'gmaqs, Scottish and the French & Acadians heritage.

=== Events ===
The city hosts multiple annual special events which include Sno-Fest in February, Salmon Fest which runs from late June to early July, the Bluegrass Festival which takes place in September, and the Harvest Festival in the fall. Other efforts to increase tourism include an 8.5 metres (28 feet) salmon statue made of stainless steel. Restigouche Sam, as the statue was christened, was donated to the city to honour Campbellton's historical connection with the "salmon-rich" Restigouche River. Several murals have also been created to beautify the city.

In 2017, Campbellton celebrated the 50th Anniversaries for both the Salmon Festival as well as its Centennial Library.

== Sports ==
The Memorial Civic Centre is the most important sporting infrastructure in the city. The Memorial Civic Centre opened in downtown Campbellton on the bank of the Restigouche River in 1992, following a fire to the 1950s era Memorial Arena located on Arran Street. Its 3,500 seat multi-purpose arena with Olympic size ice surface is home to the Maritime Junior Hockey League's Junior A ice hockey team, the Campbellton Tigers. The complex is equipped to accommodate sporting events, entertainment, commercial functions and trade shows on a local, regional or national basis.

- The 2003 Canada Winter Games took place in the facility and Sidney Crosby was present to represent his native Nova Scotia in the sport of ice hockey.
- In 2006, the city was host to the Acadian Games.
- In 2009, CBC's Hockey Day in Canada was broadcast from Campbellton, where Ron MacLean and Don Cherry did their segment of Coach's Corner at the Memorial Civic Centre.

Campbellton has an 18-hole golf course, the Restigouche Golf Club which was founded in 1923 and overlooks the Restigouche River.

=== Campbellton Tigers ===
From 1967–68 to 1989–90, the Hardy Cup was awarded to the Intermediate "A" and later Senior "AA" champion of Canada. The Tigers won more championships than any other team with three titles, in 1972, 1977 and 1988. In fact, only the Charlottetown Islanders won the cup more than once with two titles. The Tigers won the Col. J. Bourque Trophy as Eastern Canada Champions a record 4 times. The Eastern Canada champions faced the Western Canada champions for the Hardy Cup for the title of Champions of Canada. The 1972 and 1977 teams were inducted into the New Brunswick Sports Hall of Fame as part of the Campbellton hockey dynasty of the 1970s. Gerry Ouellette, former member of the Boston Bruins, coached all three championship teams and the fourth team in 1978 which lost in the finals. Ouellette was a player-coach for the first title in 1972.

1971–1972 The 1972 Campbellton Tigers defeated the Rosetown Red Wings 3 games to 2 in the best of five finals which were held in Rosetown, Saskatchewan. The team was inducted into the New Brunswick Sports Hall of Fame in 1998, and included Gord Gallant and Peter Maher.

1976–1977 The 1977 Campbellton Tigers defeated the Warroad Lakers of Warroad, Minnesota 3 games to 1 in the best of five finals which were held in Campbellton, New Brunswick. The Tigers had a record of 49 wins, 5 losses and 1 tie during the regular season and a record of 24 wins and 1 loss in the playoffs. The team was inducted into the New Brunswick Sports Hall of Fame in 2002.

== Infrastructure ==
=== Transportation ===
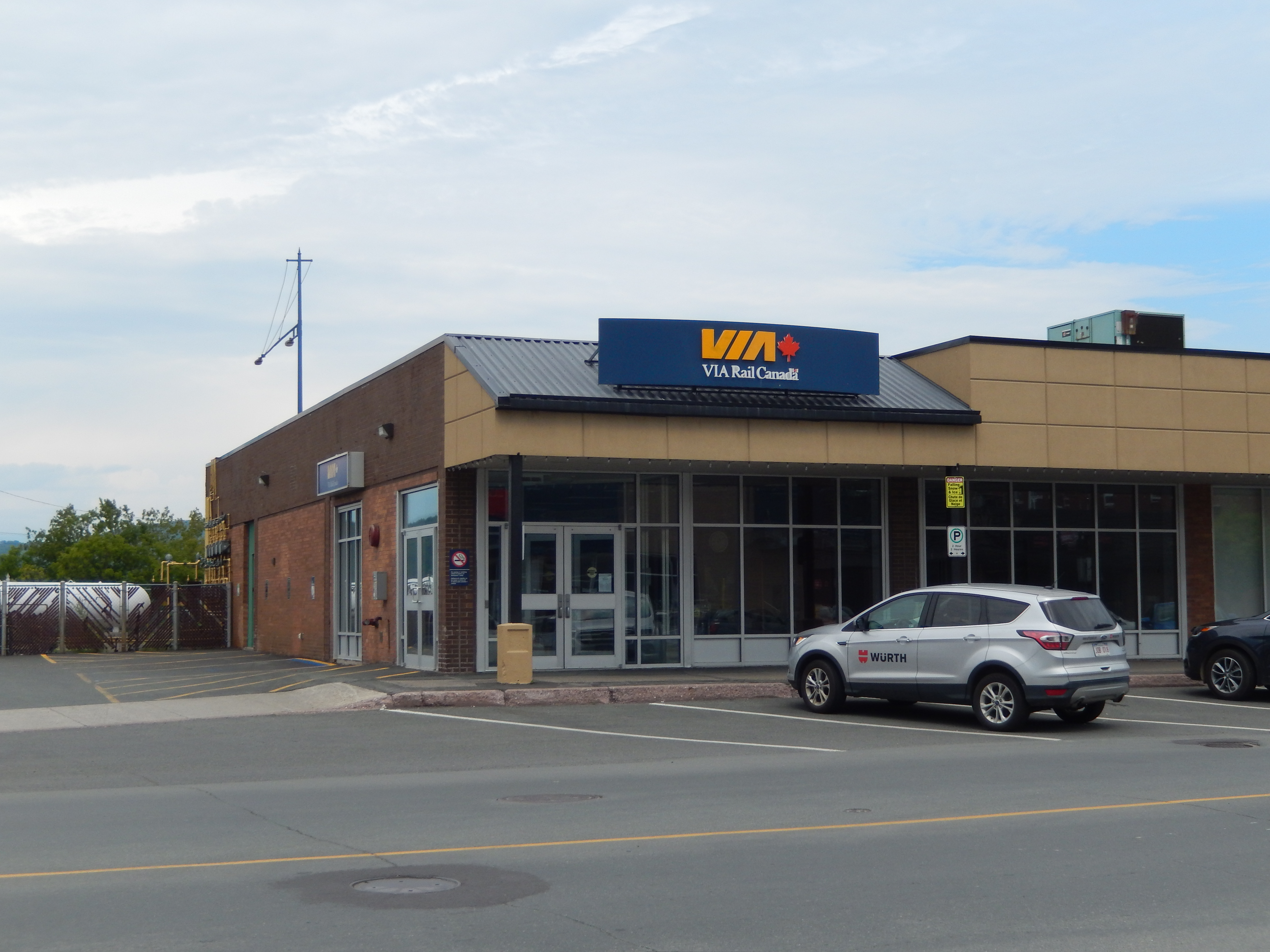
The Via Rail Station in Campbellton

The Campbellton station is served by Via Rail's train "The Ocean" which travels the Montreal-Halifax route three times a week.

Major bus services include Maritime Bus in Campbellton, and Orléans Express across the river in Pointe-à-la-Croix.

There is also a summertime tour bus which makes its way downtown. Multiple taxi companies provide the city and outskirts with taxi service 24 hours a day.

The J. C. Van Horne Bridge connects Campbellton to the province of Quebec. Route 11 provides a major highway connection to other major centres in the northern part of the province such as Bathurst and Miramichi, as well as providing a link to Moncton, and the Trans-Canada Highway. Travelling west, this highway becomes Route 17 at the Tide Head - Matapédia exit, which is the only highway which connects the North Shore to the northwestern part of the province.

Campbellton is about 20 minutes away by car from Charlo Airport, which is not served by any scheduled commercial flights. The city is also located within just over an hour's drive of Bathurst Airport, which offers Air Canada flights to Montreal.

=== Health care ===
The city is serviced by 2 health care facilities, Campbellton Regional Hospital and the Restigouche Hospital Centre, which houses a psychiatric care facility. Campbellton benefits from the 100 bed Campbellton Nursing Home Inc. and many special care homes and personal care centers.

== Education ==
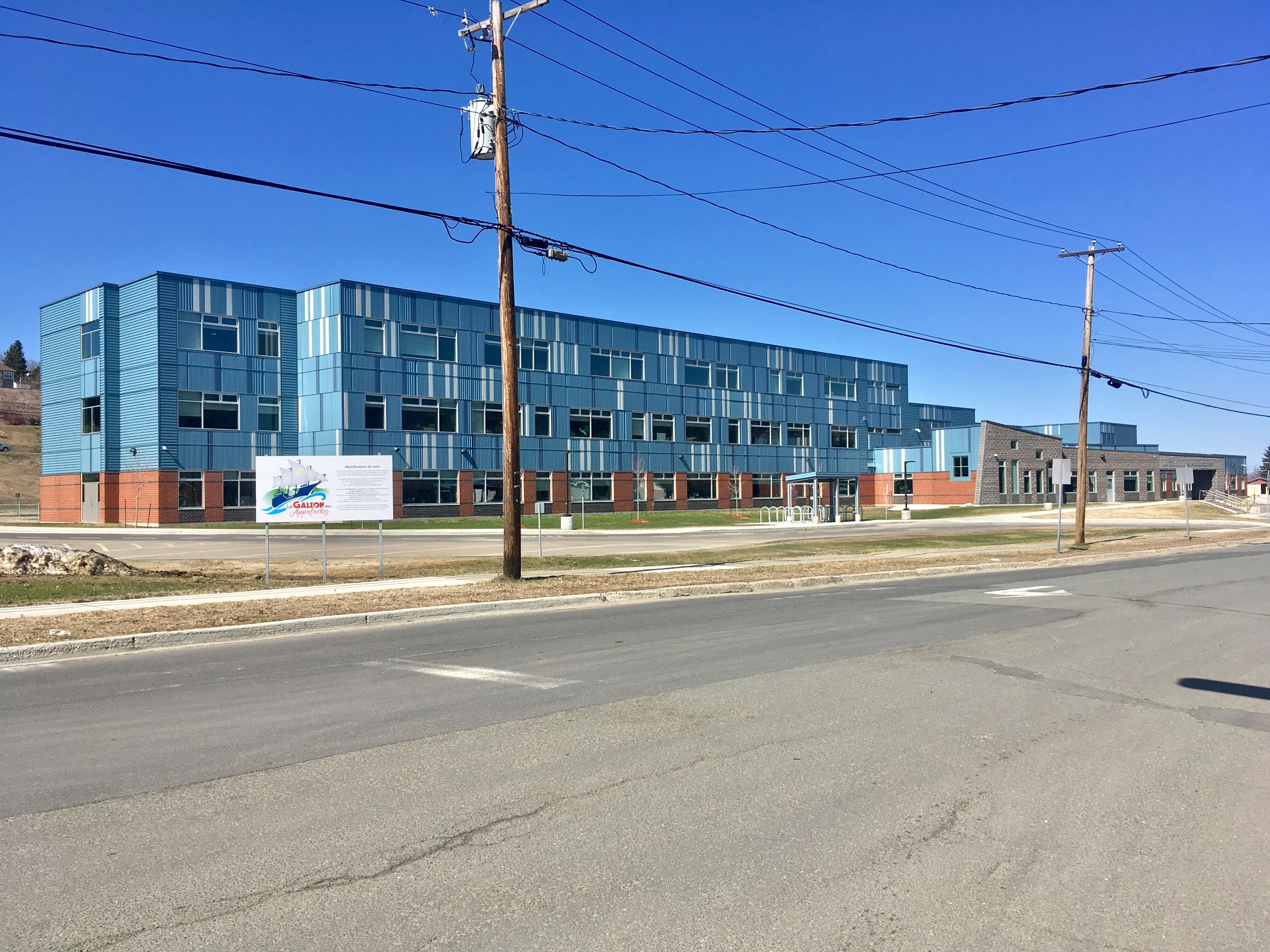
Le Galion des Appalaches is the region's newest school. It opened in 2018.

Campbellton is home to two high schools: one catering to the francophone community (Polyvalente Roland-Pépin) and the other to the English community (Sugarloaf Senior High School). The other grade schools are Lord Beaverbrook School and Campbellton Middle School for English students, however they will soon be replaced with a new Regional Anglophone School, upon which construction was supposed to commence in 2019, but was delayed by at least one year by the provincial government in December 2018. A new francophone K-8 School, Le Galion des Appalaches, was completed and opened in early 2018, combining the students who had previously gone to older schools in Atholville and Campbellton.

English schools are served by Anglophone North School District, while francophone schools are part of the District scolaire francophone Nord-Est (Francophone Nord-Est School District).

The New Brunswick Community College CCNB has a campus in Campbellton which provides instruction in various trades, including woodworking, office administration, social services and health sciences.

== Other services ==
The city has an RCMP station on Arran Street, which serves as the regional headquarters of District 9 comprising Restigouche County and the Western part of Gloucester County.

The Campbellton Fire Station is located at 33 Roseberry Street. The department is composed of a fire chief, 7 full-time firefighters, and 29 paid on-call firefighters.

Campbellton is home to a New Brunswick Provincial Court located downtown on Water Street. All judges of this court have jurisdiction throughout the province and the Campbellton court possesses a satellite location in St-Quentin. Court of Queen's Bench sittings for the Judicial District of Campbellton are held in this court.

The Restigouche Regional Service Commission, which is located at 68A Water Street, is governed by a board of 12 (largely ex-officio) directors, and provides the following services to all municipalities and rural Communities within the county:

- Local and Regional Planning, such as zoning by-laws
- Solid Waste Management
- Regional Policing Collaboration
- Regional Emergency Measures Planning
- Regional Sport, Recreational, and Cultural Infrastructure Planning and Cost-Sharing
- Service arrangements
- Collaboration on regional issues
- Services to First Nations Communities

There are numerous law firms, lawyers and attorneys in the city offering a fair amount of professional services to clients. There are also two Chartered Professional Accounting offices in the city meeting the needs of the business community.

== Notable people ==
- René Lévesque, the founder of the Parti Québécois political party and the 23rd Premier of Quebec
- Brenda Best, an award-winning singer-songwriter
- Patsy Gallant, popular singer and musical theatre actress

== See also ==
- List of communities in New Brunswick
- Listuguj Mi'gmaq First Nation
