= Le Galion des Appalaches =

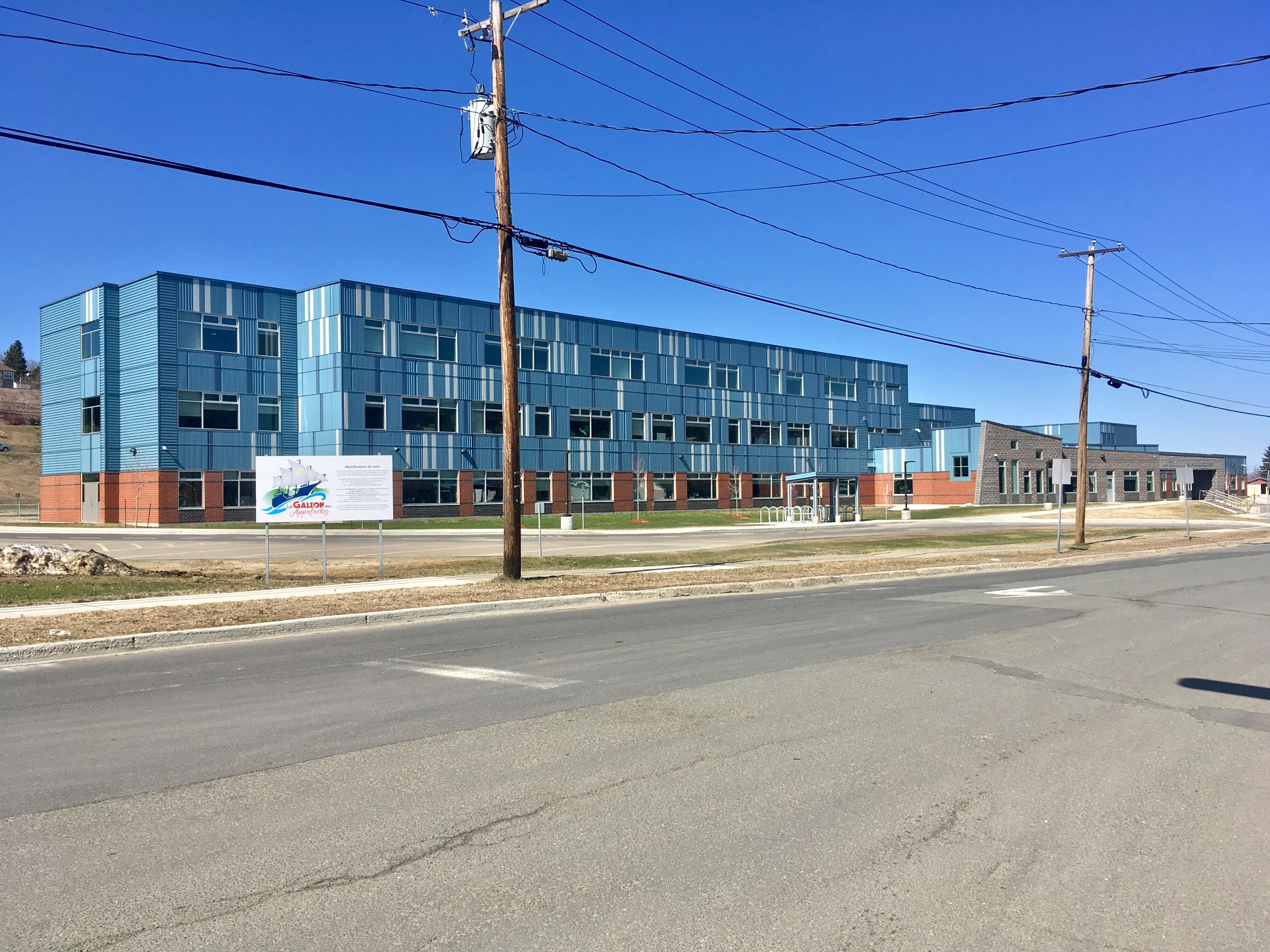
- Le Galion des Appalaches

Location
- 61 Dover St, Campbellton, New Brunswick, Canada
- Coordinates: 48.000581°N 66.665°W

Information
- School type: Public, K-8 School
- Opened: January 10, 2018
- School district: District scolaire francophone Nord-Est
- Principal: Magali Roussel
- Grades: K-8
- Enrollment: 605
- Language: French
- Website: www.galiondesappalaches.ca

Le Galion des Appalaches is a Francophone K-8 school in Campbellton, New Brunswick. It was recently built and opened in January 2018. When it opened, it combined all students from Apollo XI, in Campbellton, Versant-Nord in Atholville, Mgr Melanson in Val-d'Amours, and Rendez-vous des Jeunes in Saint-Arthur, as well as the 7th and 8th graders from the Polyvalente Roland-Pépin, just up the street. The school houses 605 students in total.
