= Miramichi Valley High School =

Miramichi Valley High School (MVHS)

Location
- 345 Mckenna Avenue; Miramichi, New Brunswick, New Brunswick, E1V 3S9; Canada; 47.0068°N 65.58289°W

Information
- School type: High School
- School district: Anglophone North
- Superintendent: Mark Donovan
- Principal: Melanie Burns
- Grades: 9-12
- Enrollment: 500
- Language: English; French immersion
- Area: Miramichi, New Brunswick
- Colours: Blue and Gold
- Mascot: Pulamoo
- Team name: Pulamoo
- Website: mvhs.nbed.nb.ca
- ^{‡} All statistics in this infobox (unless otherwise cited) is referenced with

Miramichi Valley High School is one of two public, English language high schools in the city of Miramichi, New Brunswick, Canada. It serves principally residents from the north side of the Miramichi River, both from the city of Miramichi, and smaller communities distributed from Tabusintac in the east, to Upper Blackville in the west. The school opened its doors in January 1972 to students in grades 10–12, with Charles Hubbard as principal. In 1994 grade 9 classes were added. The school's mascot is Samoo the Pulamoo, a boxing Salmon.

== See also ==
- Anglophone North School District
