= Dalhousie, New Brunswick =

Former town in New Brunswick, Canada

Dalhousie
- Dissolved town
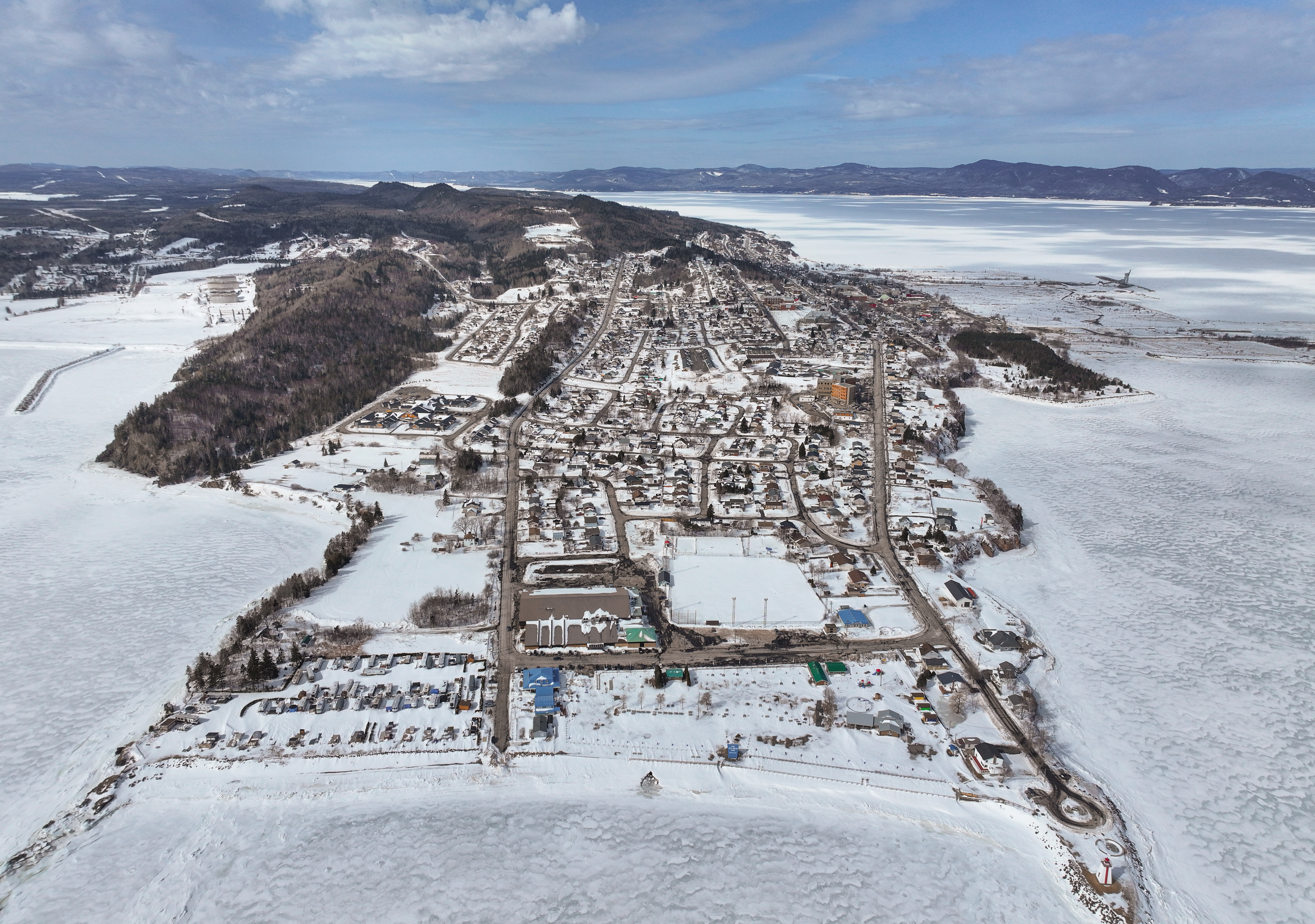
- Aerial view of Dalhousie, 2025

- Location within New Brunswick.
- Coordinates: 48.066°N 66.369°W
- Country: Canada
- Province: New Brunswick
- County: Restigouche
- Town: Dissolved Jan 1st, 2023
- Founded: 1827; 199 years ago
- Incorporated: 1905; 121 years ago (town)
- Amalgamated: January 1, 2023; 3 years ago
- Electoral Districts Federal: Madawaska—Restigouche
- Provincial: Restigouche East

Area
  - Land: 15.12 km^{2} (5.84 sq mi)

Population (2021)
  - Total: 3,223
  - Density: 213.1/km^{2} (552/sq mi)
  - Pop 2016–21: ▲3.1%
  - Dwellings: 1,678
- Time zone: UTC−4 (AST)
  - Summer (DST): UTC−3 (ADT)
- Postal code: E8C
- Area code: 506
- Highways: Route 134; Route 275; Route 11
- Website: www.heron-bay.ca

Dalhousie (/dælˈhaʊzi/ dal-HOW-zee) is a former town in Restigouche County, New Brunswick. It was a town from 1905 to 2023, when it amalgamated with Charlo to form the town of Heron Bay. The name Dalhousie is still retained for address purposes. Heron Bay is the northernmost municipality in New Brunswick.

== History ==
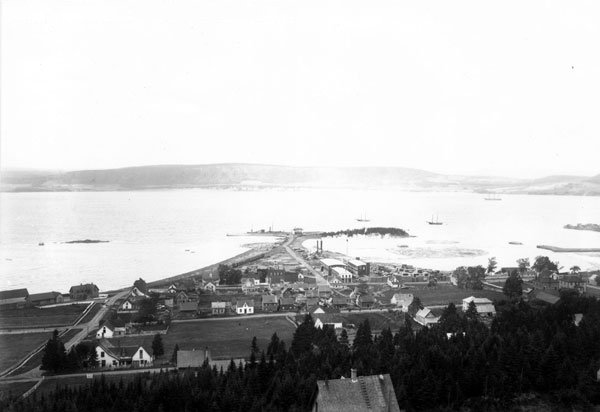
Looking toward Restigouche River, circa 1900.

Dalhousie was the shire town of Restigouche County and dates European settlement to 1800. The Town of Dalhousie has been through some very distinct periods between its founding in 1825 and today. Prior to 1825, few showed much interest in the northern part of the province, but in that year the Great Miramichi Fire raged through central New Brunswick and into Maine, destroying the forests that were the mainstay of the province's economy. Lumbermen looked north to the great pine stands of the Nipisiguit and the Restigouche.

Dalhousie, located at the mouth of the Restigouche, began to grow. Soon it was a booming town and became the Shiretown of the newly created Restigouche County. Lumber and fishing were the main interests, although agriculture was more important in the early days than it is today.

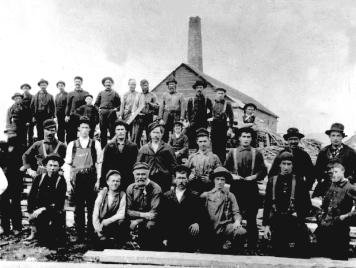
Lumber Sawmill Workers in Dalhousie, N.B., circa 1900

Dalhousie was the leading town of the area until the arrival of the railway following confederation. With steep hills at its back, the Intercolonial Railway (ICR) bypassed the town while its nearby rival, Campbellton, surged ahead. That would be the situation until the late 1920s, when Dalhousie was picked as the site of a giant paper mill. The International Paper Company built what was then one of the largest newsprint mills in the world and the town changed forever. From 1929 on, the mill would dominate life in Dalhousie. For a time, the deepwater port attracted ships to move ore from the Bathurst Mining Camp deposits (e.g. Heath Steele Mines) to various offshore smelters.

Parents of some of our older citizens would tell their children that, in some ways, it was a better town before the mill. Certainly the mill was one of the town's most imposing features. It occupied much of one side of the main street, blocked access to and even views of the shore. Dalhousie has been called "a waterfront town without a waterfront." The mill also meant that the town had a high average income. It brought a new and different kind of prosperity. Still, Dalhousie was in the situation of many one-industry towns – dependent on the success of that one main sector of its economy.

The hilly site was first laid out in 1826 with the first settlement established by Scottish settlers in 1827. It was named after the 9th Earl of Dalhousie, who was then the governor of both Upper Canada and Lower Canada. Some Acadians displaced in the Great Upheaval also settled in Dalhousie, and to this day there is a very close balance between anglophones and francophones. Some of the present residents can trace ancestry back to the original European settlers in the region.

Dalhousie was officially incorporated in 1905. It has been, in the past, referred to as Papertown.

== Geography ==
Dalhousie is the most northern point in New Brunswick, and thus is in the Maritime provinces. It is situated in the Restigouche River valley at the tongue of the river where it discharges into Chaleur Bay. The valley lies in a hilly region, part of the Appalachian mountain range, although the Dalhousie town site is situated on a hill side several decameters above sea level with some development to its south on a low ridge of approximately 260 metres elevation. The town is surrounded by salt and fresh water bodies, which are home to many species of wildlife, unique birds, and fish. The area is rich in natural resources.

Dalhousie faces Miguasha, Quebec, on the Gaspé Peninsula to the north. The city of Campbellton lies 20 km (12 mi) upriver to the west and the city of Bathurst is approximately 80 km (50 mi) southeast along the shore of Chaleur Bay. There are no major centres south of Dalhousie as this is the undeveloped and heavily forested geographic centre of the province.

== Economy ==
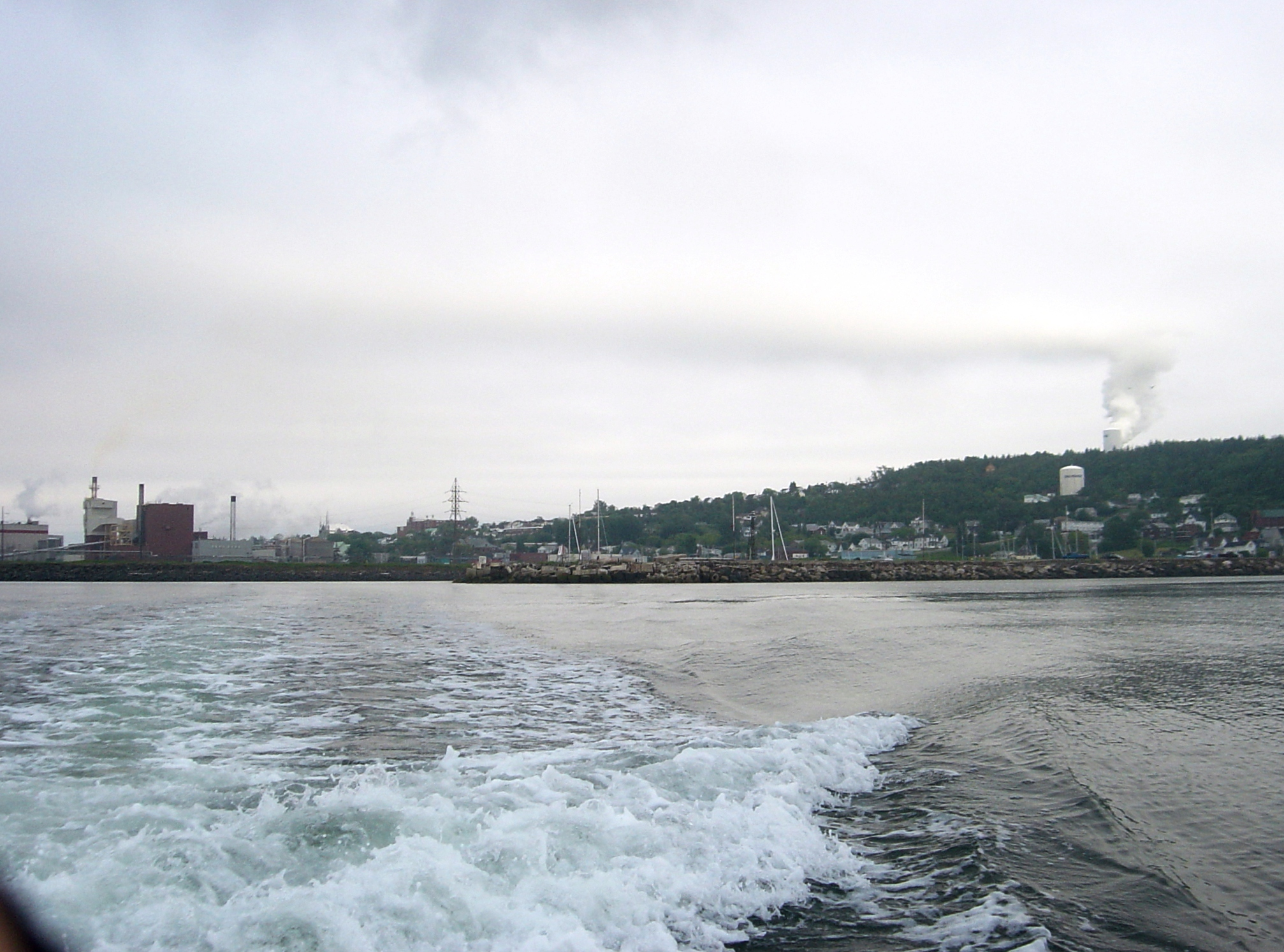
Industrial view of Dalhousie, June 2007

Until January 31, 2008, the economy was dominated by the forestry industry, namely a large pulp and paper mill spanning the waterfront along the Restigouche River. This mill was built to produce newsprint by the New Brunswick International Paper Co. in 1928 (a subsidiary of International Paper). Dalhousie was prosperous for many decades due to the mill and the employment opportunities it created.

The mill underwent ownership changes in 1980, when Oji Paper Co. Ltd. and Mitsui & Co. of Japan purchased 33 per cent of the mill. They grouped it under the name Canadian International Paper. In 1991, it was purchased by Canadian Pacific Limited, who grouped it under their Canadian Pacific Forest Products subsidiary. The mill changed hands again in 1994, when CPFP changed to become Avenor Inc. In 1998 Bowater purchased the Dalhousie newsprint mill, and it was renamed "Bowater Maritimes Inc.".

The 2007 merger of Bowater and Abitibi Consolidated resulted in the decision by the newly merged company to announce the closure of the Dalhousie newsprint mill on 29 November 2007 due to apparent market conditions. The mill, which had produced 640 tonnes of newsprint per day for shipment by rail, truck and ship to domestic and international markets, was officially closed on 31 January 2008. Consequently, the economy of the town of Dalhousie is facing uncertainty during the post-industrial adjustment. Due to the closure of this mill, hundreds were left without work in the local economy and some were forced to move. The mill has since been completely demolished.

Following the closure of the pulp and paper mill in 2008, Pioneer Chemicals closed a processing plant on the western edge of the town. As a result of the closures of these industries, the New Brunswick East Coast Railway and its subsequent owner CN Rail announced that it was declaring the railway spur into the town surplus. However, a deal was struck between CN and the Port of Dalhousie for this section of line to remain open under a leasing agreement in November 2011.

The only industry that remained was the generating station, but it was decommissioned in 2012 and demolished in 2015 after one more failed attempt.

While there are several smaller employers, the largest employer in the town currently is the Dalhousie Nursing Home.

== Transportation ==
Dalhousie Island Lighthouse
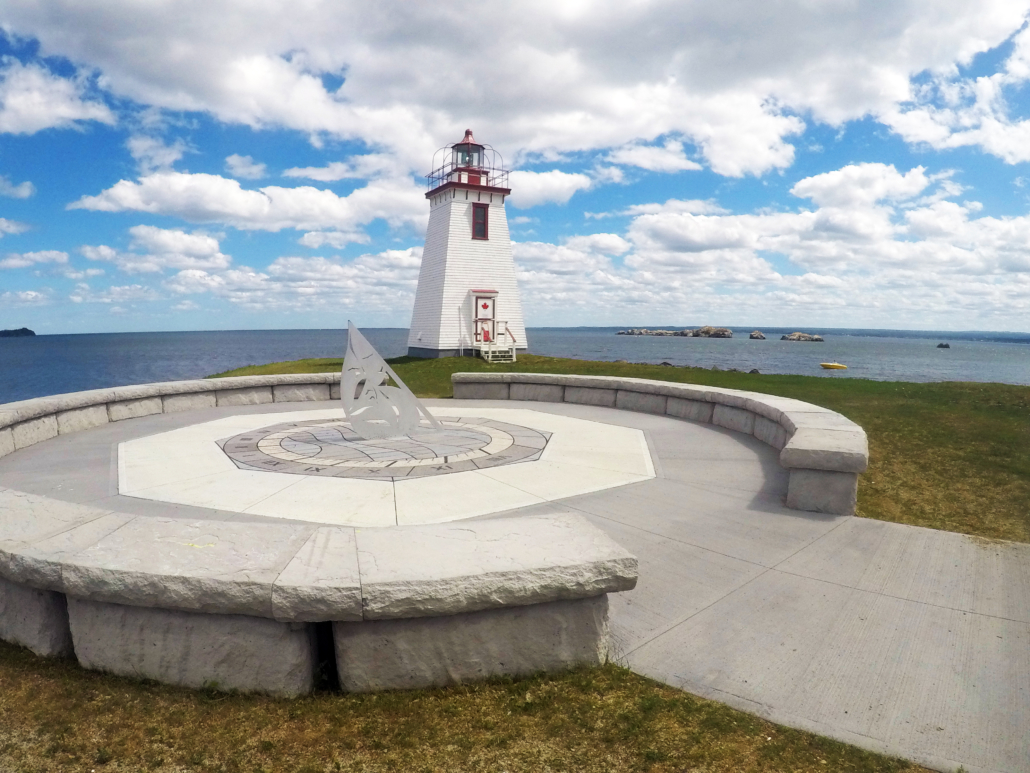
- Inch Arran Lighthouse, Dalhousie, New Brunswick.
- Location: Dalhousie, New Brunswick, Canada
- Coordinates: 48°04′20″N 66°21′51″W

Tower
- Constructed: 1886 (first); 1905 (second)
- Foundation: concrete base (current)
- Construction: metal skeletal tower (current) wooden tower (first and second)
- Height: 19 m (62 ft)
- Shape: quadrangular skeletal tower with daymark and light (current) quadrangular tower (first) octagonal truncated tower with balcony and lantern (second)
- Markings: red and white daymark with green square at the center (current) white tower (first) white tower, red lantern (second)
- Power source: solar power
- Operator: Canadian Coast Guard

Light
- First lit: 1974 (current)
- Deactivated: 1905 (first); 1974 (second)
- Focal height: 21 m (69 ft)
- Range: 15 nmi (28 km; 17 mi)
- Characteristic: Fl W 5s

The community benefits from its geography by having a deep sea port, which is ice-free year round. The administration of the port was privatised in 2006, as the result of the federal government's divestiture programme. The port is located on the south shore of the Bay of Chaleur at the mouth of the Restigouche River, and includes 98 acres (40 hectares) of land, 494 acres (200 hectares) of "waterlot," and two cargo facilities—East Bay Marine Terminal, whose chief cargo is paper, and the West Wharf, which imports petroleum and coal and exports ore concentrates. Berth depths range from 9.7 to 10.3 meters (32 to 34 ft). The port is located adjacent to the now-demolished pulp and paper mill. The east wharf can handle 340m vessels with maximum draught at low tide of 9.1m, and has indoor storage facilities of 1ha, while the west wharf handles vessels of up to 355m with draught 10.3m.

It is also served by the New Brunswick East Coast Railway and is located on the Highway 11 arterial highway. Via Rail Canada provides passenger train service three days per week with stops at Charlo immediately east of the town and in Campbellton to the west.

The Charlo Airport is located several kilometres east of the town for private and charter service with scheduled air service available at the Bathurst Airport.

== Education ==
Dalhousie has two elementary schools (Académie Notre-Dame and L.E. Reinsborough), and two high schools (Dalhousie Regional High School and École Aux quatre vents).

== Demographics ==
In the 2021 Census of Population conducted by Statistics Canada, Dalhousie had a population of 3,223 living in 1,523 of its 1,678 total private dwellings, a change of 3.1% from its 2016 population of 3,126. With a land area of 15.12 km^{2} (5.84 sq mi), it had a population density of 213.2/km^{2} (552.1/sq mi) in 2021.

Canada census – Dalhousie community profile

	2021	2016	2011
Population	3,223 (+3.1% from 2016)	3,126 (-11.0% from 2011)	3,512 (-4.5% from 2006)
Land area	15.12 km^{2} (5.84 sq mi)	15.22 km^{2} (5.88 sq mi)	14.51 km^{2} (5.60 sq mi)
Population density	213.1/km^{2} (552/sq mi)	205.3/km^{2} (532/sq mi)	242.1/km^{2} (627/sq mi)
Median age	58.0 (M: 57.6, F: 58.8)	58.4 (M: 57.2, F: 59.6)	54.3 (M: 52.8, F: 55.8)
Private dwellings	1,678 (total) 1,523 (occupied)	1,696 (total)	1,816 (total)
Median household income	$54,400	$45,747	$39,847

References: 2021 2016 2011

Historical Census Data - Dalhousie, New Brunswick

Year	Pop.	±%
1901	862	—
1911	1,650	+91.4%
1921	1,958	+18.7%
1931	3,974	+103.0%
1941	4,508	+13.4%
1951	4,939	+9.6%

Year	Pop.	±%
1961	5,856	+18.6%
1971	6,255	+6.8%
1981	5,707	−8.8%
1986	5,363	−6.0%
1991	4,775	−11.0%
1996	4,500	−5.8%

Year	Pop.	±%
2001	3,975	−11.7%
2001A	3,928	−1.2%
2006	3,676	−6.4%
2011	3,512	−4.5%
2016	3,126	−11.0%
2021	3,223	+3.1%

(A) adjustment due to boundary change.

=== Religion ===
Christianity is the dominant religion, with the Roman Catholic Church being the largest denomination. Protestant denominations include the Anglican Church of Canada, United Church of Canada, Presbyterian Church in Canada and several evangelical groups.

=== Language ===
Canada Census Mother Tongue - Dalhousie, New Brunswick
Census	Total	English			French			English & French			Other		
Year	Responses	Count	Trend	Pop %	Count	Trend	Pop %	Count	Trend	Pop %	Count	Trend	Pop %
2011	3,320	1,710	▼0.3%	51.51%	1,520	▼13.6%	45.78%	75	▲150.0%	2.26%	15	▼66.7%	0.45%
2006	3,550	1,715	▼13.2%	48.31%	1,760	▲0.6%	49.58%	30	▼60.0%	0.84%	45	▲28.6%	1.27%
2001	3,835	1,975	▼9.6%	51.50%	1,750	▼13.6%	45.63%	75	▼50.0%	1.96%	35	▲133.3%	0.91%
1996	4,375	2,185	n/a	49.94%	2,025	n/a	46.29%	150	n/a	3.43%	15	n/a	0.34%

== Climate ==
Dalhousie has a humid continental climate. In spite of its marine position, this climate regime is typical of New Brunswick and is manifested by vast differences in temperature between the warm summers and the cold snowy winters.

Climate data for Dalhousie
Month	Jan	Feb	Mar	Apr	May	Jun	Jul	Aug	Sep	Oct	Nov	Dec	Year
Mean daily maximum °C (°F)	−7 (19)	−6 (21)	0 (32)	6 (42)	13 (55)	19 (66)	22 (71)	21 (69)	17 (62)	10 (50)	2 (35)	−3 (26)	8 (46)
Mean daily minimum °C (°F)	−18 (0)	−16 (3)	−10 (14)	−3 (26)	2 (35)	8 (46)	11 (51)	11 (51)	7 (44)	1 (33)	−4 (24)	−12 (10)	−2 (28)
Average precipitation mm (inches)	76 (3.0)	69 (2.7)	66 (2.6)	46 (1.8)	61 (2.4)	76 (3.0)	84 (3.3)	76 (3.0)	69 (2.7)	74 (2.9)	71 (2.8)	69 (2.7)	840 (32.9)
Source: Weatherbase

== Notable people ==
- Guy Arseneault, teacher and politician
- Joseph Cunard Barberie, politician
- Joel Bernard, politician
- Gordie Dwyer, hockey player and coach
- Kate Simpson Hayes, writer
- Charles H. LaBillois, politician and merchant
- Allan Maher, businessman and politician
- Marie-Jo Pelletier, alternate captain for the Buffalo Beauts
- Linda Silas, nurse and trade unionist

== See also ==
- List of lighthouses in New Brunswick
- List of communities in New Brunswick
