= Francophone Nord-Est School District =

School district in New Brunswick, Canada

Location
- Canada

District information
- Type: Public
- Grades: K-12

Other information
- Website: dsfne.ca

Francophone Nord-Est is a Francophone Canadian school district in New Brunswick with central offices in Tracadie-Sheila. As of the 2019–2020 academic year, the district operates 34 public schools with 9,031 students and 746 teachers. The district mainly serves Campbellton, Bathurst, and Acadian Peninsula in Restigouche and Gloucester counties, but has nine subdistricts that include Robinsonville, Maltais, Dalhousie, Balmoral, Belledune, Nicholas-Denys, Saint-Sauveur, Bois-Blanc, Miscou Island, and Val-Comeau.

== Primary schools ==
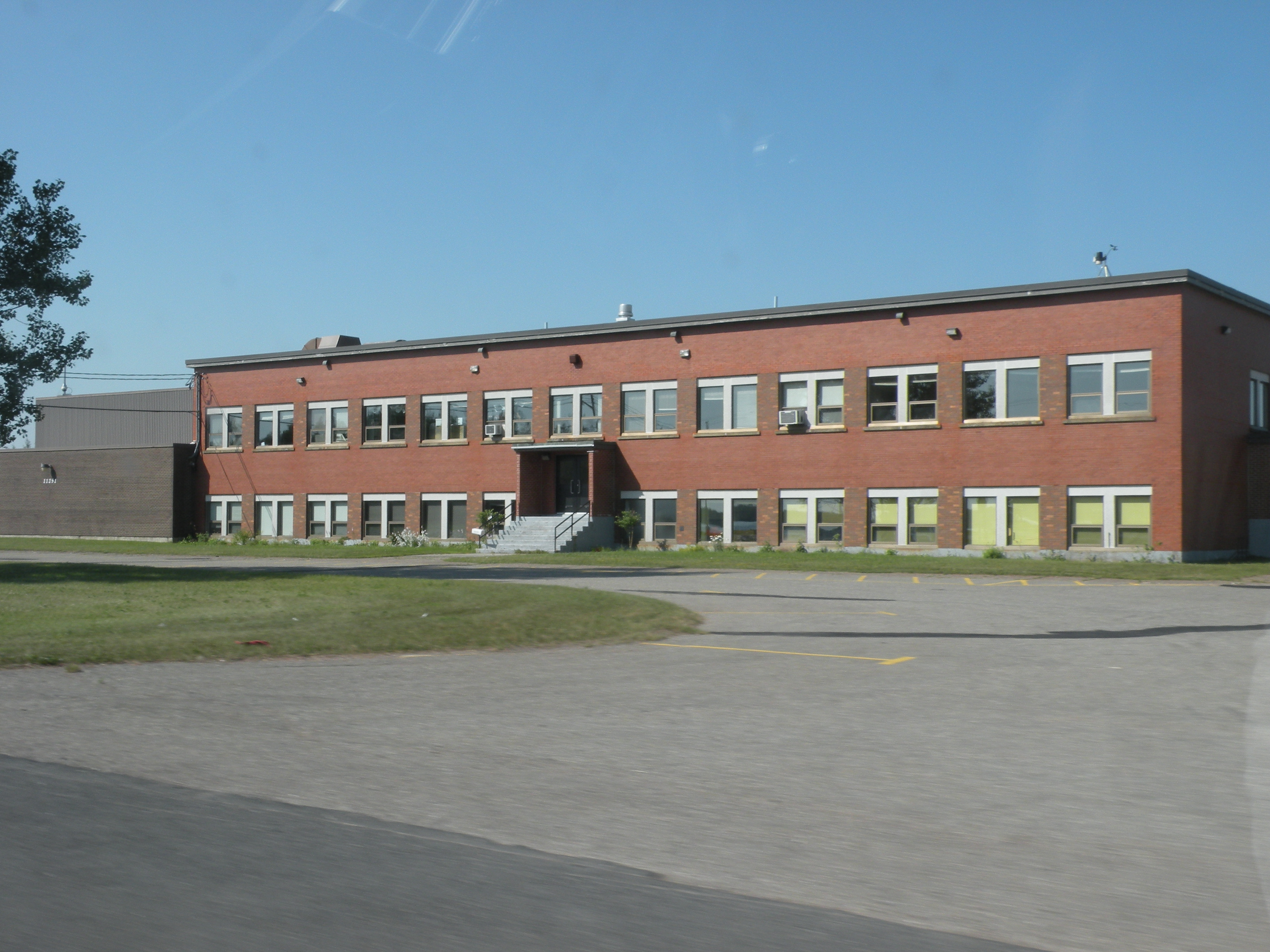
École La Rivière Pokemouche

School name	Grades	Area served	Location
Académie Assomption	K-5	Bathurst	Bathurst
Académie Notre-Dame	K-5	Dalhousie	Dalhousie
Carrefour Étudiant	K-8	Bathurst	Beresford
Centre scolaire communautaire La fontaine	K-12	Tracadie-Sheila	Néguac
Cité de l’Amitié	K-5	Bathurst	Bathurst
École L’Envolée	K-8	Shippagan	Shippagan
École L’Escale-des-Jeunes	K-8	Caraquet	Bas-Caraquet
École L’Étincelle	K-8	Shippagan	Sainte-Marie-Saint-Raphaël
École La Passerelle	K-8	Tracadie-Sheila	Pont-Landry
École La Relève-de-Saint-Isidore	K-8	Tracadie-Sheila	Hautes-Terres
École La Rivière	K-8	Shippagan	Pokemouche
École La Ruche	K-5	Tracadie-Sheila	Tracadie-Sheila
École La Source	K-8	Tracadie-Sheila	Tracadie-Sheila
École La Villa des Amis	K-8	Tracadie-Sheila	Tracadie Beach
École Le Tremplin	6-8	Tracadie-Sheila	Tracadie-Sheila
École Léandre-LeGresley	K-8	Caraquet	Grande-Anse
École Marguerite Bourgeoys	K-8	Caraquet	Caraquet
École Ola-Léger	K-8	Caraquet	Bertrand
École René-Chouinard	K-8	Tracadie-Sheila	Lagacéville
École Soeur-Saint- Alexandre	K-8	Shippagan	Lamèque
École Terre des Jeunes	K-8	Caraquet	Hautes-Terres
François-Xavier-Daigle	K-8	Bathurst	Allardville
La Croisée de Robertville	K-8	Bathurst	Robertville
La Mosaïque du Nord	K-8	Dalhousie	Balmoral
Le Domaine Étudiant	3-8	Bathurst	Petit-Rocher
Le Galion des Appalaches	K-8	Campbellton	Campbellton
Le Tournesol	K-3	Bathurst	Petit-Rocher
Place-des-Jeunes	6-8	Bathurst	Bathurst

== Secondary schools ==
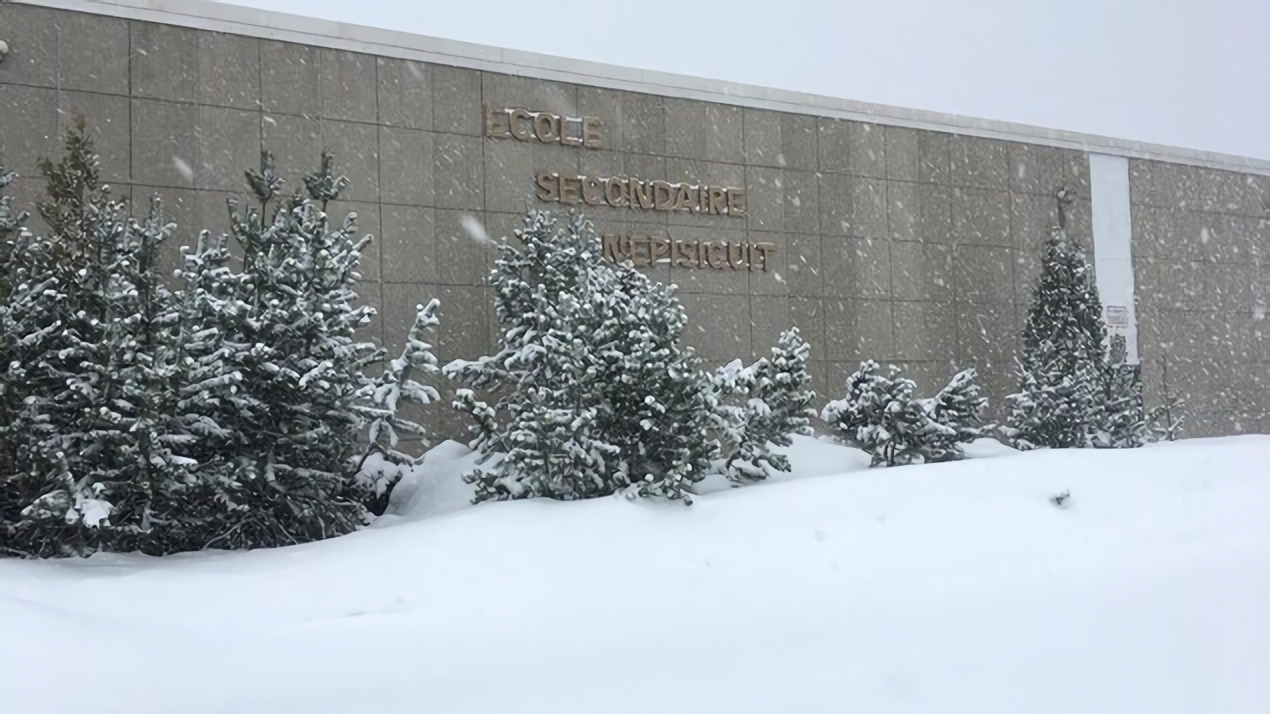
École Secondaire Népisiguit

School name	Grades	Area served	Location
Aux quatre vents	9-12	Dalhousie	Dalhousie
Centre scolaire communautaire La fontaine	K-12	Tracadie-Sheila	Néguac
École Marie-Esther	9-12	Shippagan	Shippagan
École Secondaire Népisiguit	9-12	Bathurst	Bathurst
Polyvalente Louis-Mailloux	9-12	Caraquet	Caraquet
Polyvalente Roland-Pépin	7-12	Campbellton	Campbellton
Polyvalente W.-A. Losier	9-12	Tracadie-Sheila	Tracadie-Sheila

== See also ==
- List of school districts in New Brunswick
- List of schools in New Brunswick
