= Bathurst High School (New Brunswick) =

Bathurst High School (BHS)
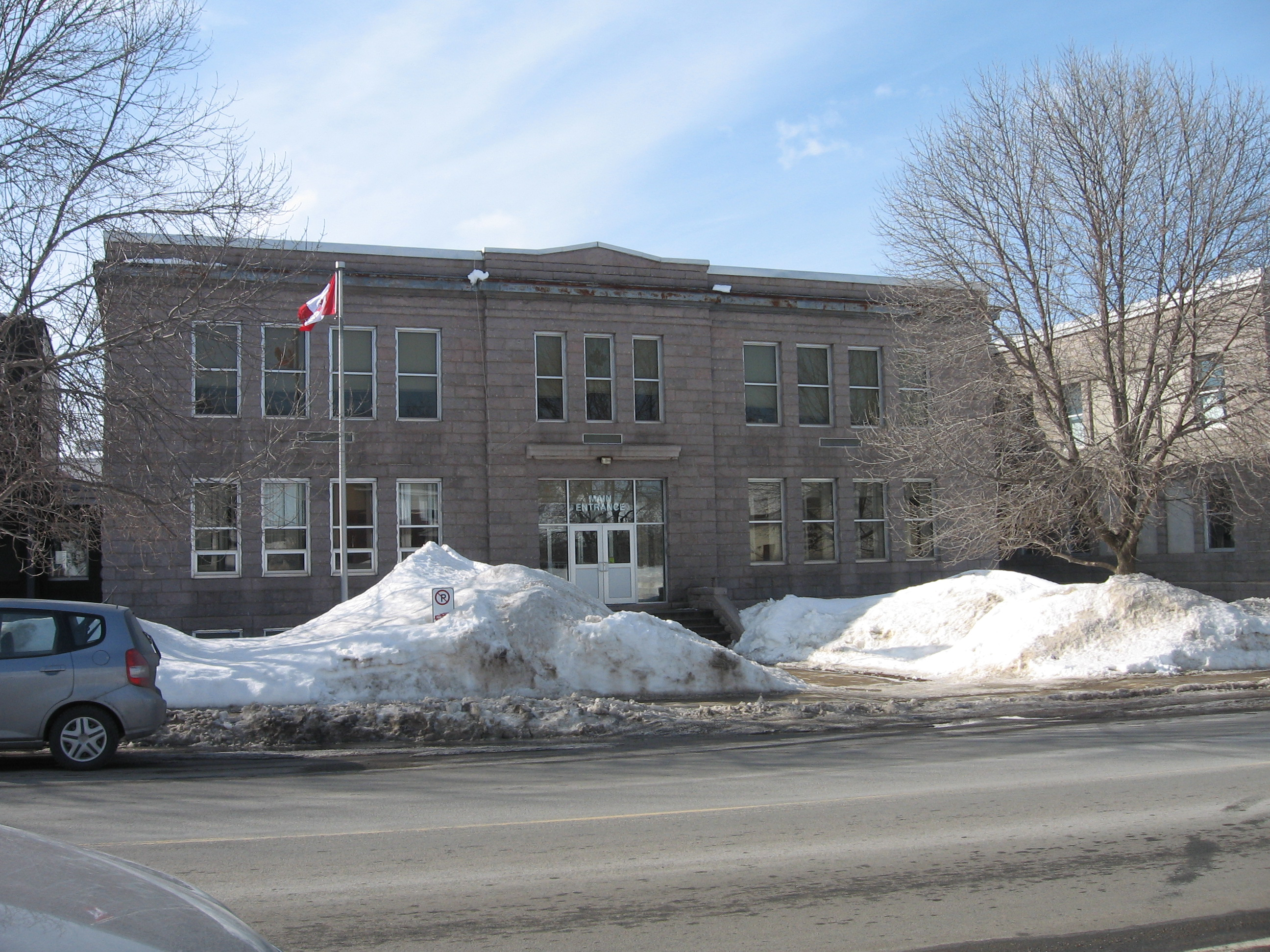

Location
- 640 King Ave; Bathurst, Gloucester, New Brunswick, E2A 1R1; Canada
- Coordinates: 47.6148429°N 65.6528348°W

Information
- School type: Public High school
- Motto: pari passu (equal footing)
- Founded: 1926
- Status: Open
- School district: Anglophone North (ASD-N)
- Superintendent: Dean Mutch
- School number: 4201
- Principal: Shaun MacDonald
- Vice Principals: George Daley & Heather Chamberlain
- Staff: 44
- Grades: 9-12
- Enrollment: ~500
- Language: English; French immersion
- Area: Bathurst
- Colours: Red; Black
- Team name: Phantoms
- Website: bathursthigh.nbed.nb.ca
- ^{‡} All statistics in this infobox (unless otherwise cited) is referenced with

Bathurst High School is an English-language secondary school located in Bathurst, New Brunswick, Canada.

== School crest ==
School crest

The school crest is a black shield with red edging bearing the school's initials ("BHS") stylised across the central face of the shield, written in red, with a white line that follows the top contour above the initials, and a red maple leaf below the initials, bearing the Latin motto Pari Passu in white in a scroll-like space, in the base of the shield, and included within the unbroken red edging that marks the perimeter of the crest. The shield appears to get larger about halfway down, and the expansion is occupied by large, tapering red lines that occupy the expanded space.

== School mascot ==
The school mascot is The Phantom. Varsity sports teams are called the "Phantoms" or the "BHS Phantoms", and the typical image of the mascot is of a hooded person or ghost, usually faceless, bearing resemblance to the iconic "Grim Reaper" image, carrying a scythe. The origins of this mascot are not related to the "Grim Reaper", but rather the legend of the "Phantom Ship of the Bay of Chaleur", a longstanding legend in the Bathurst area that a ghost ship, or phantom ship, has been seen on fire floating in the local harbour throughout the city's history.

== School motto ==
The official school motto is the Latin phrase Pari Passu. Curiously, although this is not the "official" motto of the school, it is the most prominent and recognized motto by students and alumni and appears on the school crest. The origins and raison d'être of the motto appear to be lost, but it is probable that the context refers to the equality of all graduates, each with an equal share to the claim of a graduate of the school. "On equal footing" is the translation of the school crest.

== Bathurst van collision ==
Bathurst High School made headlines across Canada on January 12, 2008, following a motor vehicle crash that killed seven students from the school's basketball team, as well as the wife of their coach. The 1997 Ford Econoline E350 Club Wagon in which they were travelling spun across the centre line and struck a tractor trailer in freezing rain conditions. Four in the van survived, including the team's coach, who was driving the van, and his daughter. The vehicle was determined to have been in poor condition, with worn all-season tires, and a partially rusted frame.

== Notable graduates ==
- Scott Smith, president of Hockey Canada
