= Sugarloaf Senior High School =

Sugarloaf High School

Location
- 201 Dover Street; Campbellton, New Brunswick, E3N 1R3; Canada; 47.998611°N 66.67539°W

Information
- School type: Public, High school
- Motto: A Posse ad Esse (From Possibility To Reality)
- Status: Open
- School district: Anglophone North
- Superintendent: Dean Mutch
- School number: 3823
- Principal: Jon Watts
- Staff: 32+
- Grades: 9-12
- Enrollment: 344 (September 16, 2019)
- Language: English; French immersion
- Area: Campbellton
- Colours: White Silver Royal Blue
- Mascot: The Bruin
- Team name: Bruins
- Newspaper: The Bruin
- Feeder schools: Campbellton Middle School; Alaqsite'w Gitpu School
- Student Council President: Liana Lanteigne
- Website: sugarloaf.nbed.nb.ca
- ^{‡} All statistics in this infobox (unless otherwise cited) is referenced with

Sugarloaf Senior High School is an English high school, with French immersion, located in Campbellton, New Brunswick, Canada. Its name comes from the nearby Sugarloaf mountain, a local landmark adjacent to the provincial park of the same name.

== Student body ==
There are approximately 500 students enrolled at Sugarloaf Senior High School and graduating classes are usually in the 70-100 range. Classes are taught for grades 9 through 12.

== Athletics ==
Operating under the name "Bruins," Sugarloaf Senior High has seen great success in provincial high school sport competition. Most notably, its boys basketball teams have done extremely well in the past, and to date have earned the most championships of any AA ranked school. The Varsity boys soccer team won the provincial championships in the fall 2001 season. Also, the Boys JV basketball team won the NBIAA Provincial tournament in 2007. In 2010, The Senior Boys "AA" Basketball captured the NBIAA "AA" banner in the 1984–1985, 1985–1986, and 2009 - 2010 seasons.

== Student Council ==
Students gather at the end of every school year, and participate in a vote regarding the elected positions of the Student Council Executive. Willing candidates follow the proper nomination sequence, required to have an average of 75% or more, then follow a week-long campaign progress, where they gather support from the student body. Grade Level & Class Representatives are elected at the beginning of the school year. The roles of the Student Council Executive and Grade Representatives include: being the voices of the students, organizing school related activities, raising school morale, maintaining moral fiber, and make sure the school year is one that students and staff will enjoy and benefit from.
