= École Secondaire Népisiguit =

Location
- 915 St. Anne St; Bathurst, Gloucester, New Brunswick, E2A 6X1; Canada
- Coordinates: 47.6255°N 65.6844°W

Information
- Motto: Dignité, Responsabilité, Savoir (Dignity, Responsibility, Knowledge)
- Founded: 1970
- School board: Francophone Nord-est
- Principal: Paul Thibodeau
- Grades: 9-12
- Enrollment: 1,200
- Language: French
- Area: North East New-Brunswick
- Colours: Burgundy and White
- Website: esn.nbed.nb.ca

École Secondaire Népisiguit (English: Nepisiguit Secondary School) is the only French-speaking high school in the Bathurst, New Brunswick, Canada area. It holds around 1,200 students from grade nine through twelve.
