= Kate Simpson Hayes =

Canadian writer (1856–1945)

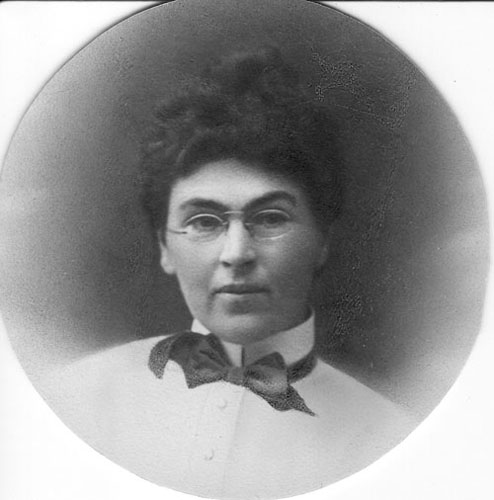
- Born: Catherine Ethel Hayes; 6 July 1856; Dalhousie, New Brunswick, British North America
- Died: January 15, 1945 (aged 88); British Columbia, Canada
- Occupations: playwright, author, journalist, poet, teacher, milliner, legislative librarian
- Spouse: Charles Bowman Simpson (m. 1882, separated)
- Partner: Nicholas Flood Davin
- Children: 4
- Writing career
- Pen name: Mary Markwell; Elaine; Marka Wohl; Yukon Bill
- Language: English

"Society at large depends upon the home -- it has been called the 'bulwark of the nation,' and it is there woman's place is and should be."

Kate Simpson Hayes (née, Hayes; after first marriage, Simpson; after separation, Hayes; pen names, Mary Markwell, Elaine, Marka Wohl, Yukon Bill; 6 July 1856 – 15 January 1945) was a Canadian playwright, author, journalist, and poet from New Brunswick. As the first woman journalist in Western Canada, she wrote for the Free Press and the Regina Leader using a variety of pen names, including "Mary Markwell". She was a founding member of the Canadian Women's Press Club and the author of works such as Prairie pot-pourri. Hayes also worked in Britain for a time encouraging other women to emigrate to Canada.

Hayes also worked for the Canadian Pacific Railway, promoting the emigration of woman domestics from Britain. She was a charter member of the Canadian Women's Press Club, and club president in 1906. Hayes continued to write until well into her seventies.

== Biography ==
Catherine Ethel Hayes was born in 1856, in Dalhousie, New Brunswick. Her parents were Patrick Hayes, a lumber merchant and storekeeper, and Anna Hagan Hayes, a school teacher.

Hayes was the first woman journalist in the Canadian West. She wrote for the Free Press, Winnipeg, and wrote poetry using the pen name Mary Markwell for the Regina, Saskatchewan Leader. A founding member of the Canadian Women's Press Club, she also served as club president in 1906.

Hayes was opposed to women being given the vote. She was a "determined anti-suffragist". She was employed by the Canadian Pacific Railway, where she encouraged other women to emigrate to Canada.

== Personal life ==
She married Charles Bowman Simpson on 2 June 1882; they had two children before separating in 1889. She had a relationship with Nicholas Flood Davin, and they had two children. Her children were: Burke Hayes Simpson, Anna W Elaine ("Bonnie") Simpson, Henry Arthur Davin, and Agnes Agatha Davin.

Kate Simpson Hayes died in Victoria, British Columbia, 15 January 1945. Her papers are housed at the Saskatchewan Archives, McGill University, and National Archives of Canada.

== Selected works ==
- Prairie pot-pourri
- The legend of the West, 1908
