= Charles H. LaBillois =

Canadian politician

Charles H. LaBillois (December 18, 1856 – November 22, 1928) was a Canadian merchant and political figure active in New Brunswick. He represented Restigouche County in the Legislative Assembly of New Brunswick from 1883 to 1899 as a Conservative member.

He was born in Dalhousie, Colony of New Brunswick, the son of Joseph H. LaBillois, and was educated in Bonaventure County, Quebec. LaBillois was of French and Irish descent. He married Charlotte McNaughton, with whom he had 4 children: Opal Lennox, Alma Colton, Albert (b. 1892, d. 1976 in Montreal, Quebec) and George.

In 1891, he was named to the province's Executive Council. LaBillois served as a minister without portfolio from 1891 to 1897 when he was appointed the Commissioner of Agriculture. He served until 1901 when he was made Minister of Public Works, a portfolio he held until 1908. He died in Montreal in 1928.
