= Marie-Jo Pelletier =

Canadian ice hockey player

- Born: 5 September 1997 (age 28) Dalhousie, New Brunswick, Canada
- Height: 151 cm (4 ft 11 in)
- Position: Defence
- Shot: Right
- PHF team Former teams: Buffalo Beauts; New Hampshire Wildcats
- Playing career: 2015–2022

Marie-Jo Pelletier (born 5 September 1997) is a Canadian former ice hockey player. She played her entire professional career for the Buffalo Beauts of the Premier Hockey Federation (PHF; called NWHL until 2021).

== Playing career ==
Pelletier played college ice hockey with the New Hampshire Wildcats women's ice hockey program in the Hockey East (WHEA) conference of the NCAA Division I during 2015 to 2019. With the Wildcats, she scored 52 points across 143 games and was a three-season captain. She garnered the nickname 'Mighty Mouse,' a recognition of her excellent play in defiance of her short stature. She won the Hockey East Sportsmanship Award in 2019, becoming the second University of New Hampshire (UNH) player to win the award, after Sara Carlson.

Following graduation in 2019, Pelletier opted to sign with the Buffalo Beauts of the National Women's Hockey League (NWHL). As a rookie in the 2019–20 NWHL season, she posted 21 points in 24 games – setting a league record for most power-play points in a season – and was named to the 2020 NWHL All-Star Game. She was also a finalist for the NWHL Newcomer of the Year award and was selected as one of the NWHL Fans’ Three Stars of the Year.

In the 2020–21 season, she contributed 3 assists across 6 games in the Lake Placid bubble but the Beauts narrowly missed the playoffs. On 13 May 2021, Pelletier became the first player in the league to sign a contract for the 2021–22 season, returning to the Beauts for a third season.

On April 1, 2022, Pelletier announced her retirement via social media.

== Career statistics ==
			Regular season					Playoffs
Season	Team	League	GP	G	A	Pts	PIM	GP	G	A	Pts	PIM
2019-20	Buffalo Beauts	NWHL	24	6	15	21	0	1	0	0	0	0
2020-21	Buffalo Beauts	NWHL	6	0	3	3	0	-	-	-	-	-
2021-22	Buffalo Beauts	PHF	20	0	5	5	2	1	0	0	0	0
NWHL totals			50	6	23	29	2	2	0	0	0	0
