= Polyvalente Roland-Pépin =

Location
- 45A rue Village; Campbellton, New Brunswick, E3N 3G4; Canada; 47°59′49″N 66°39′46″W

Information
- School type: High school
- Founded: 1970
- School board: Francophone Nord-est
- Grades: 9–12
- Enrollment: 277
- Language: French
- Area: North New-Brunswick
- Team name: Predators
- Website: rolandpepin.wordpress.com

Polyvalente Roland-Pépin is a Francophone high school in Campbellton, New Brunswick, Canada.
