= École Aux quatre vents =

Location
- 499 Promenade des Jeux du Canada; Dalhousie, New Brunswick, E8C 1V6; Canada; 48.059395°N 66.391044°W

Information
- School type: High School
- Founded: 1976
- School board: Francophone Nord-est
- Principal: Julie Marcoux
- Grades: 9-12
- Language: French
- Area: North New-Brunswick
- Colours: Red and white
- Mascot: Woosh
- Team name: Les Cyclones
- Website: auxquatrevents.nbed.nb.ca

École Aux quatre vents is a Francophone high school in Dalhousie, New Brunswick, Canada. It serves around 200 students from grade nine through twelve of Dalhousie, Eel River Dundee, Balmoral region.
