= Dalhousie Regional High School =

Location
- 500 Canada Games Drive; Dalhousie, New Brunswick, E8C 2P5; Canada
- Coordinates: 48.058922°N 66.382881°W

Information
- School type: Public
- School district: Anglophone North School District
- School number: 3615
- Principal: Lori Johnson
- Teaching staff: 25.0
- Grades: 6-12
- Enrollment: 293 (2022-2023)
- Language: English & French
- Website: drhs.nbed.nb.ca

Dalhousie Regional High School is located in Dalhousie, New Brunswick. Dalhousie Regional High School is in the Anglophone North School District.

== Notable alumni ==
- Guy Arseneault – Member of the House of Commons of Canada and member of the Legislative Assembly of New Brunswick

== See also ==
- List of schools in New Brunswick
- Anglophone North School District
