= List of airports in New Brunswick =

New Brunswick

This is a list of airports in New Brunswick. It includes all Nav Canada certified and registered water and land airports, aerodromes and heliports in the Canadian province of New Brunswick. Airport names in italics are part of the National Airports System.

== List of airports and heliports ==
Fredericton and Greater Moncton are classified as international airports by Transport Canada.

The list is sorted by the name of the community served; click the sort buttons in the table header to switch listing order.

Community	Airport name	PU PR MI	AOE (Note: An airport of entry has four different categories. An AOE which can accept "all classes of scheduled and non-scheduled aircraft (passenger and cargo)." An AOE/# which can handle aircraft in the previous category but up to maximum number. This number can be exceeded if done in stages as shown in parentheses. An AOE/15 that can accept general aviation aircraft with a maximum of 15 passengers. An AOE/CAN which can handle aircraft subject to the CANPASS regulations.)	Operator	Elevation	ICAO	TC LID	IATA	Image	Coordinates
Bathurst	Bathurst Airport	PU	15	Northern New Brunswick Authority	196 ft (60 m)	CZBF		ZBF		47°26′54″N 67°37′29″W
Big Sevogle River	Sevogle Airport	PR		New Brunswick Department of Natural Resources	1,350 ft (410 m)		CCM3			47°11′00″N 66°09′00″W
Boston Brook	Boston Brook Airport	PR		J.D. Irving Woodlands	961 ft (293 m)		CCJ3			47°26′54″N 67°37′29″W
Grand-Bouctouche	Bouctouche Aerodrome	PR		J.D. Irving Woodlands	57 ft (17 m)		CDT5			46°30′34″N 64°41′38″W
Brockway	Brockway Airport	PR		New Brunswick Department of Natural Resources	300 ft (91 m)		CCX3			45°34′00″N 67°06′00″W
Heron Bay	Charlo Airport	PU	CANPASS	Charlo Regional Airport Authority	132 ft (40 m)	CYCL		YCL		47°59′27″N 66°19′49″W
Centreville	Centreville/Graham Field	PU		Steven Graham, Peter White	450 ft (140 m)		CGR7			46°23′28″N 67°43′22″W
Chipman	Chipman Airport	PR		J.D. Irving Woodlands	65 ft (20 m)		CCS4			46°08′54″N 65°54′18″W
Clearwater	Clearwater Aerodrome	PR		J.D. Irving Woodlands	1,330 ft (410 m)		CDJ4			46°42′45″N 66°49′45″W
Cormier-Village	Cormier Aerodrome	PR		George Cormier	84 ft (26 m)		CRM4			46°10′51″N 64°22′32″W
Cumberland Bay	Cumberland Bay Water Aerodrome	PR		Brian Pinsent	10 ft (3.0 m)		CCB7			46°00′21″N 65°54′19″W
Doaktown	Doaktown Airport	PR		J.D. Irving Woodlands	326 ft (99 m)		CDU6			46°33′09″N 66°05′36″W
Downs Gulch	Downs Gulch Aerodrome	PR		J.D. Irving Woodlands	884 ft (269 m)		CDV2			47°45′11″N 67°25′36″W
Edmundston	Edmundston Airport	PU	15	Aéroport Madawaska Airport	498 ft (152 m)	CYES				47°29′24″N 68°28′54″W
Edmundston (Madawaska River)	Edmundston (Madawaska River) Water Aerodrome	PR		Madawaska Airport	489 ft (149 m)		CMA8			47°29′11″N 68°28′25″W
Florenceville-Bristol	Bristol Aerodrome	PR		F. Allen	574 ft (175 m)		CDA6			46°27′34″N 67°33′53″W
Florenceville-Bristol	Florenceville Airport	PR	15	McCain Foods Limited	508 ft (155 m)		CCR3			46°25′34″N 67°37′41″W
Fredericton	Fredericton International Airport (Greater Fredericton International Airport)	PU	55 (140)	Fredericton International Airport Authority	67 ft (20 m)	CYFC		YFC		45°52′08″N 66°32′14″W
Fredericton	Fredericton (RCMP) Heliport	PR		Royal Canadian Mounted Police	369 ft (112 m)		CRC2			45°55′54″N 66°40′00″W
Fredericton	Scottsfield Airpark	PR		Ernie McLean	600 ft (180 m)		CCF9			45°57′37″N 67°05′43″W
Grand Falls	Grand Falls Airport	PU	CANPASS	Grand Falls Aviation	712 ft (217 m)		CCK3			47°04′30″N 67°41′06″W
Grand Manan	Grand Manan Airport	PU	15	Grand Manan Airport Commission	244 ft (74 m)		CCN2			44°42′48″N 66°47′47″W
Havelock	Havelock Airport	PU		Havelock Flying Club	425 ft (130 m)		CCS5			45°59′11″N 65°18′07″W
Juniper	Juniper Airport	PR		J.D. Irving Woodlands	839 ft (256 m)		CCE3			46°33′48″N 67°10′06″W
Kars	Kars/Jenkins Cove Water Aerodrome	PU		Richard Pattie	20 ft (6.1 m)		CJO3			45°35′38″N 65°57′25″W
Keswick River	Weyman Airpark	PU		David Bradley	140 ft (43 m)		CCG3			46°02′15″N 66°51′32″W
Miramichi	Miramichi Airport	PU		Miramichi Airport Commission	110 ft (34 m)	CYCH		YCH		47°00′28″N 65°26′57″W
Moncton	Greater Moncton Roméo LeBlanc International Airport (Moncton/Greater Moncton Roméo LeBlanc International Airport)	PU	300	Greater Moncton International Airport Authority	232 ft (71 m)	CYQM		YQM		46°06′44″N 64°40′43″W
Moncton	Moncton/McEwen Aerodrome	PR		Heritage Management	214 ft (65 m)		CCG4			46°09′14″N 64°46′07″W
Moncton	Moncton/Sailsbury Heliport	PU		Irving Oil	230 ft (70 m)		CDB5			46°02′58″N 65°03′45″W
Oromocto	CFB Gagetown	MI		DND	166 ft (51 m)	CYCX		YCX		45°50′16″N 66°26′12″W
Pokemouche	Pokemouche Airport	PU		Aéroport de la Péninsule (1985) Inc	69 ft (21 m)		CDA4			47°42′58″N 64°52′54″W
Saint John	Saint John Airport	PU	120 (140)	Saint John Airport Inc.	357 ft (109 m)	CYSJ		YSJ		45°18′57″N 65°53′25″W
Saint John	Saint John (Regional Hospital) Heliport	PR		Saint John Regional Hospital Atlantic Health Sciences Corporation	246 ft (75 m)		CSN6			45°18′08″N 66°05′17″W
Saint-Léonard	Saint-Léonard Aerodrome	PR		J.D. Irving Ltd.	794 ft (242 m)	CYSL		YSL		47°09′27″N 67°50′05″W
St. Stephen	St. Stephen Airport	PU	15	Town of St. Stephen	99 ft (30 m)		CCS3			45°12′25″N 67°14′59″W
Shediac Bridge-Shediac River	Shediac Bridge Aerodrome	PR		Maurice R. Hébert	25 ft (7.6 m)		CSB5			46°15′17″N 64°34′36″W
Sussex	Sussex Aerodrome	PU		Ross Keirstead	467 ft (142 m)		CCY3			45°41′11″N 65°32′31″W
Upper Kent	Upper Kent Aerodrome	PU		Bruce Lockhart	246 ft (75 m)		CCH2			46°35′15″N 67°43′09″W
Woodstock	Woodstock Aerodrome	PU		Woodstock Fire Department	482 ft (147 m)		CCD3			46°09′10″N 67°32′52″W
Woodstock	Woodstock/Snokist Heliport	PR		Foxco	481 ft (147 m)		CSN4			46°12′10″N 67°39′34″W

== Defunct airports ==
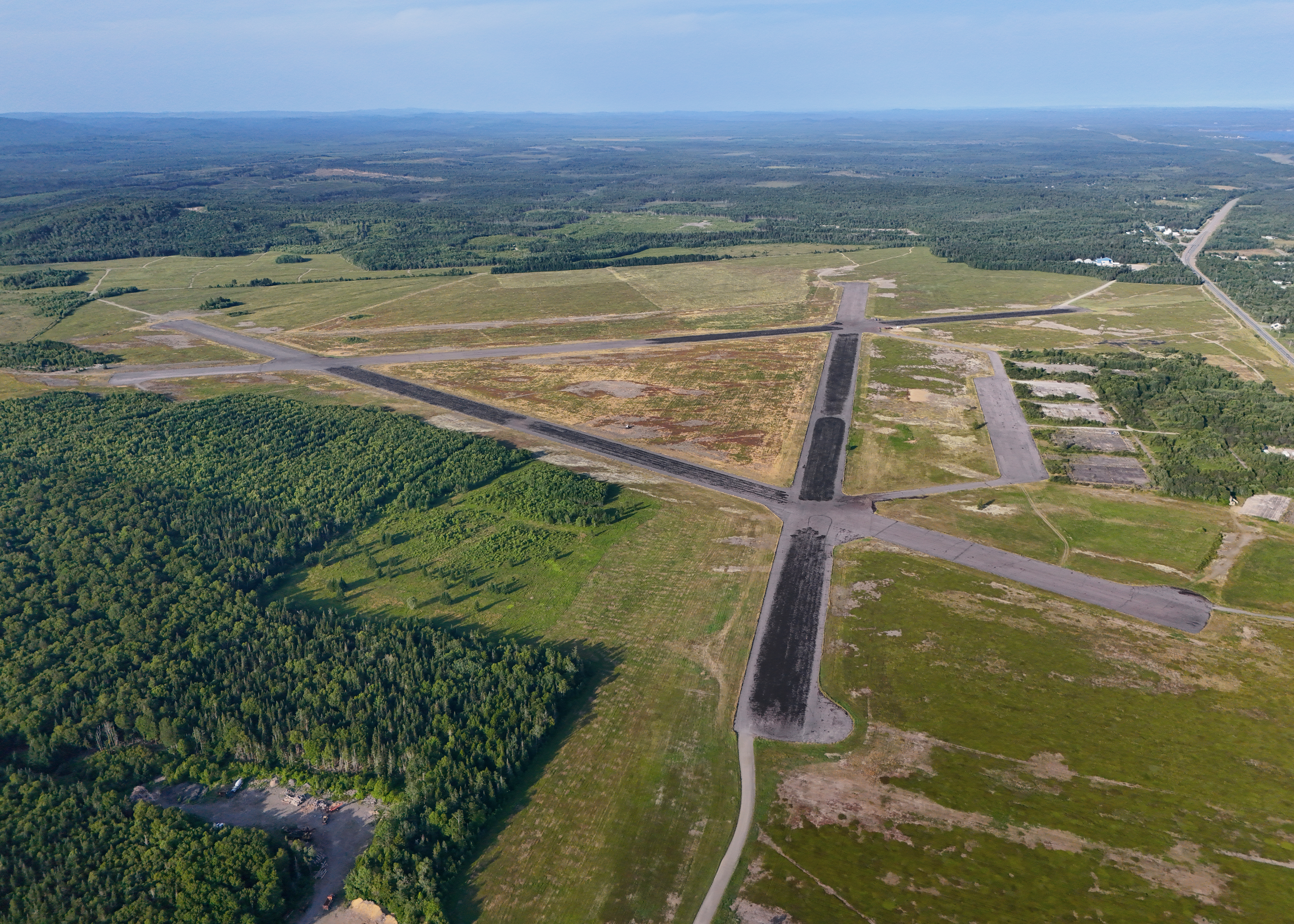
The abandoned RCAF Station Pennfield Ridge in 2025

Community	Airport name	ICAO	TC LID	IATA	Coordinates
Moncton	RCAF Station Moncton				46°06′N 64°41′W
Pennfield Ridge	RCAF Station Pennfield Ridge				45°07′38″N 066°41′40″W
Saint John	RCAF Station Saint John				45°18′00″N 66°06′00″W
Saint-Quentin	Saint-Quentin Aerodrome		CDC4		47°31′16″N 067°25′18″W
Scoudouc	RCAF Aerodrome - Scoudouc				46°10′13″N 64°35′17″W
