= Anglophone North School District =

School district in New Brunswick, Canada

Location
- Canada

District information
- Type: Public
- Grades: K-12

Students and staff
- Students: 7,722
- Teachers: 718.0

Other information
- Website: http://asd-n.nbed.nb.ca

Anglophone North is a Canadian school district in New Brunswick, operated under the direction of the Ministry of Education and Early Childhood Development.

Anglophone North is an Anglophone district operating 33 public schools (gr. K-12) in Restigouche County, Gloucester County, Northumberland County and Kent County.

As of the 2022-2023 school year, the enrollment was 7,722 students and 718.0 educators.

Its headquarters are located in Miramichi.

== List of schools ==
=== High schools ===
- Bathurst High School
- Bonar Law Memorial High School
- Dalhousie Regional High School
- James M. Hill Memorial High School
- Miramichi Valley High School
- North and South Esk Regional High School
- Sugarloaf Senior High School

=== Middle schools ===
- Campbellton Middle School
- Dalhousie Middle School
- Eleanor W. Graham Middle School
- Elsipogtog School
- Superior Middle School

=== Elementary schools ===
- Janeville Elementary School
- L.E. Reinsborough School
- Lord Beaverbrook School
- Parkwood Heights Elementary School
- Terry Fox Elementary School
- Tide Head School
- Rexton Elementary school

=== Combined schools ===
- Jacquet River School
- Blackville School
- Nelson Rural School
- Max Aitken Academy

=== Other schools ===
- Bathurst Learning Center
- Campbellton Learning Center
- Dalhousie Learning Center

== See also ==
- List of school districts in New Brunswick
- List of schools in New Brunswick
