= Bathurst Airport (New Brunswick) =

Bathurst Regional Airport
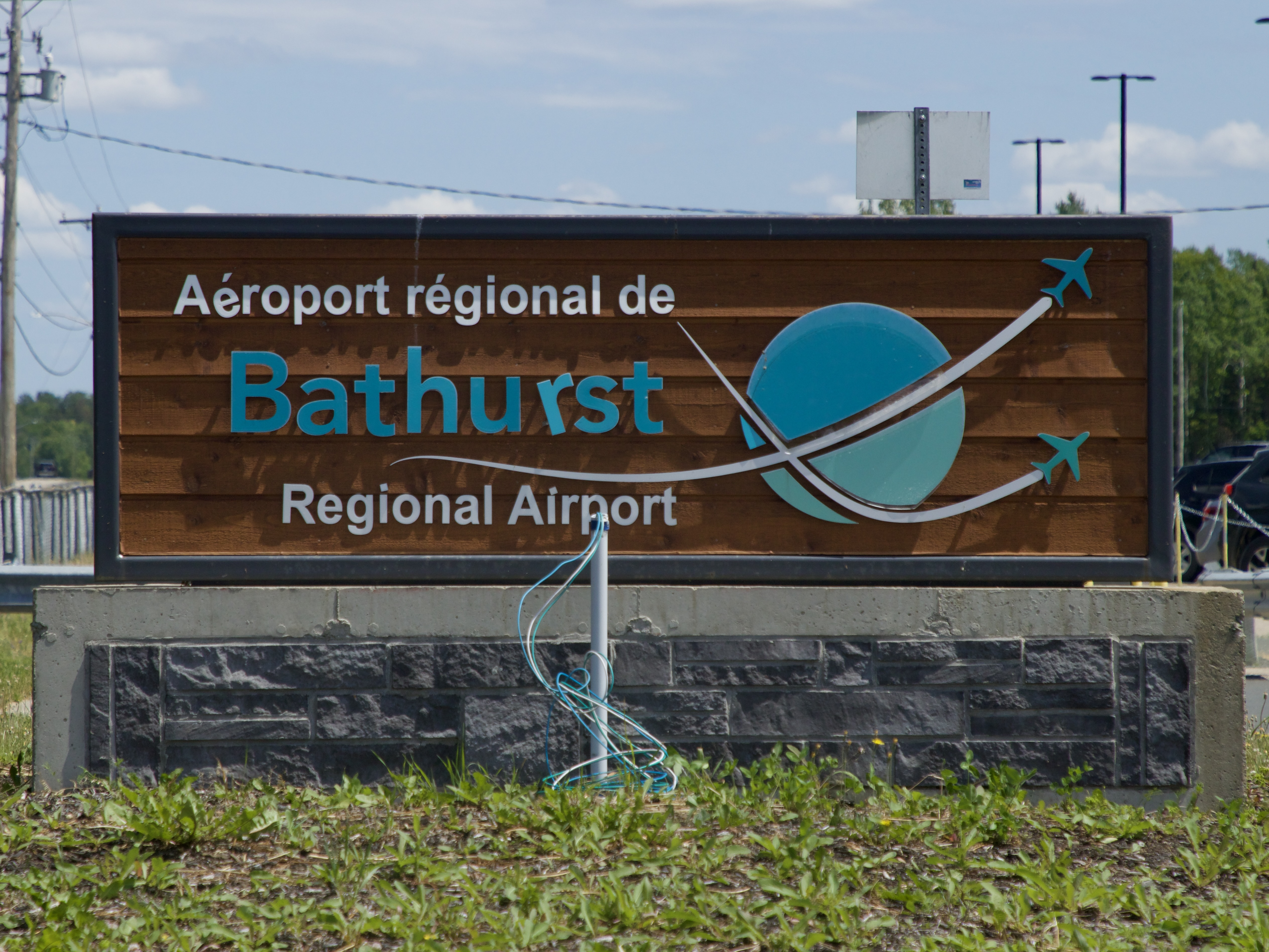
- IATA: ZBF; ICAO: CZBF; WMO: 71574

Summary
- Airport type: Public
- Operator: Northern New Brunswick Authority Inc
- Location: Bathurst, New Brunswick
- Time zone: AST (UTC−04:00)
  - Summer (DST): ADT (UTC−03:00)
- Elevation AMSL: 196 ft / 60 m
- Coordinates: 47°37′46″N 065°44′25″W

Map
- Location in New Brunswick CZBF (Canada)

Runways
Direction	Length		Surface
Direction	ft	m	Surface
10/28	5,613	1,711	Asphalt

Statistics (2010)
- Aircraft movements: 2,992
- Source: Canada Flight Supplement; Environment and Climate Change Canada; Movements from Statistics Canada

Bathurst Regional Airport (IATA: ZBF, ICAO: CZBF) is located 3 nautical miles (5.6 km; 3.5 mi) west northwest of Bathurst. It is listed as an airport of entry and can accept general aviation aircraft with up to 15 occupants.

In June 2020, Air Canada, the only airline operating scheduled passenger flights from the airport, indefinitely suspended all operation at Bathurst Airport due to the financial impact of the COVID-19 pandemic in Canada. Thrice-weekly service to Montreal resumed on June 1, 2021, however the decreased service resulted in the Bathurst Airport operating on a deficit for several years.

== Airlines and destinations ==
=== Passenger ===
Airlines	Destinations
Propair	Montréal–Trudeau, Quebec City

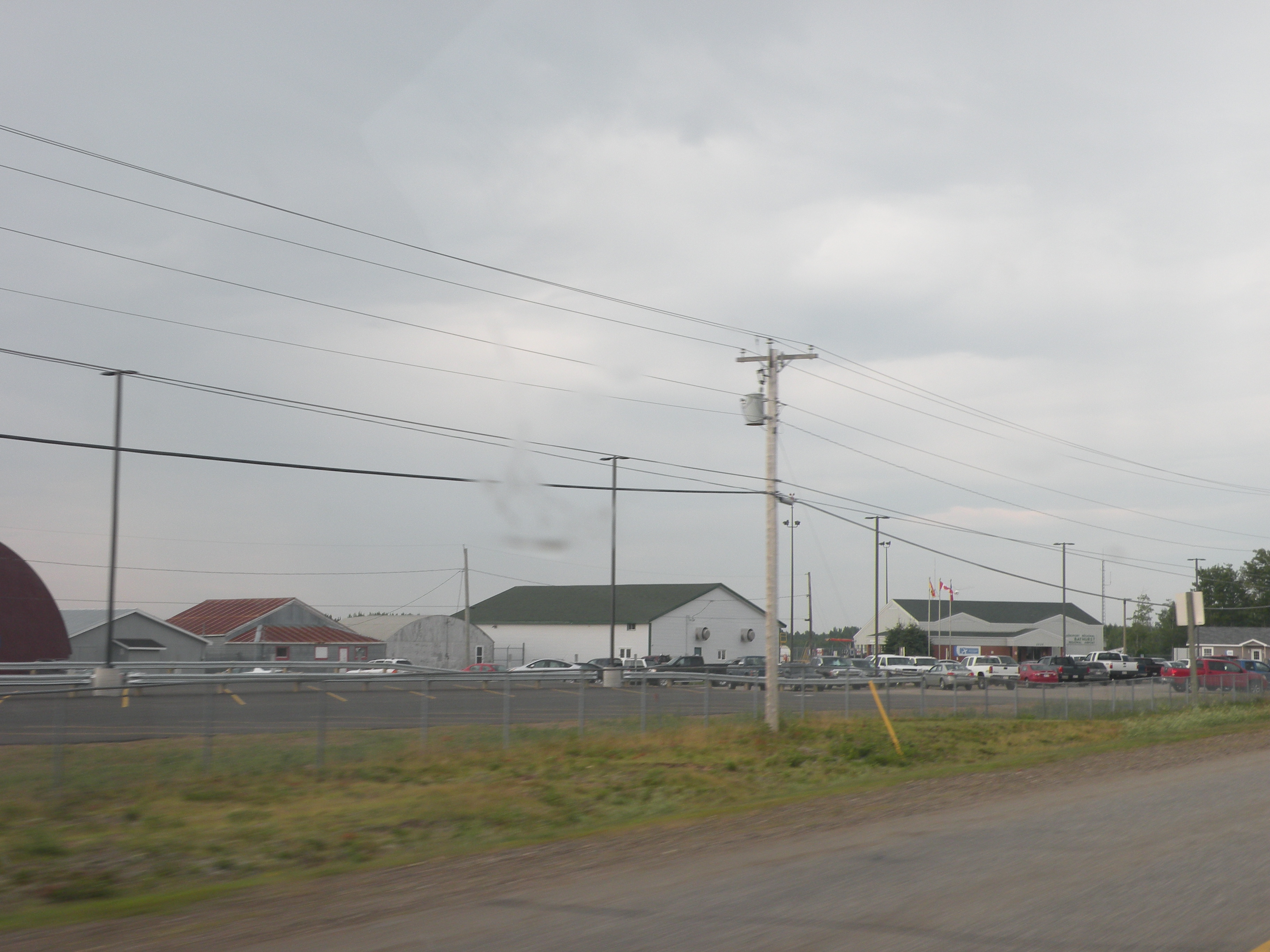
Bathurst Regional Airport in Bathurst, New Brunswick, Canada
