= List of schools in Greater Moncton =

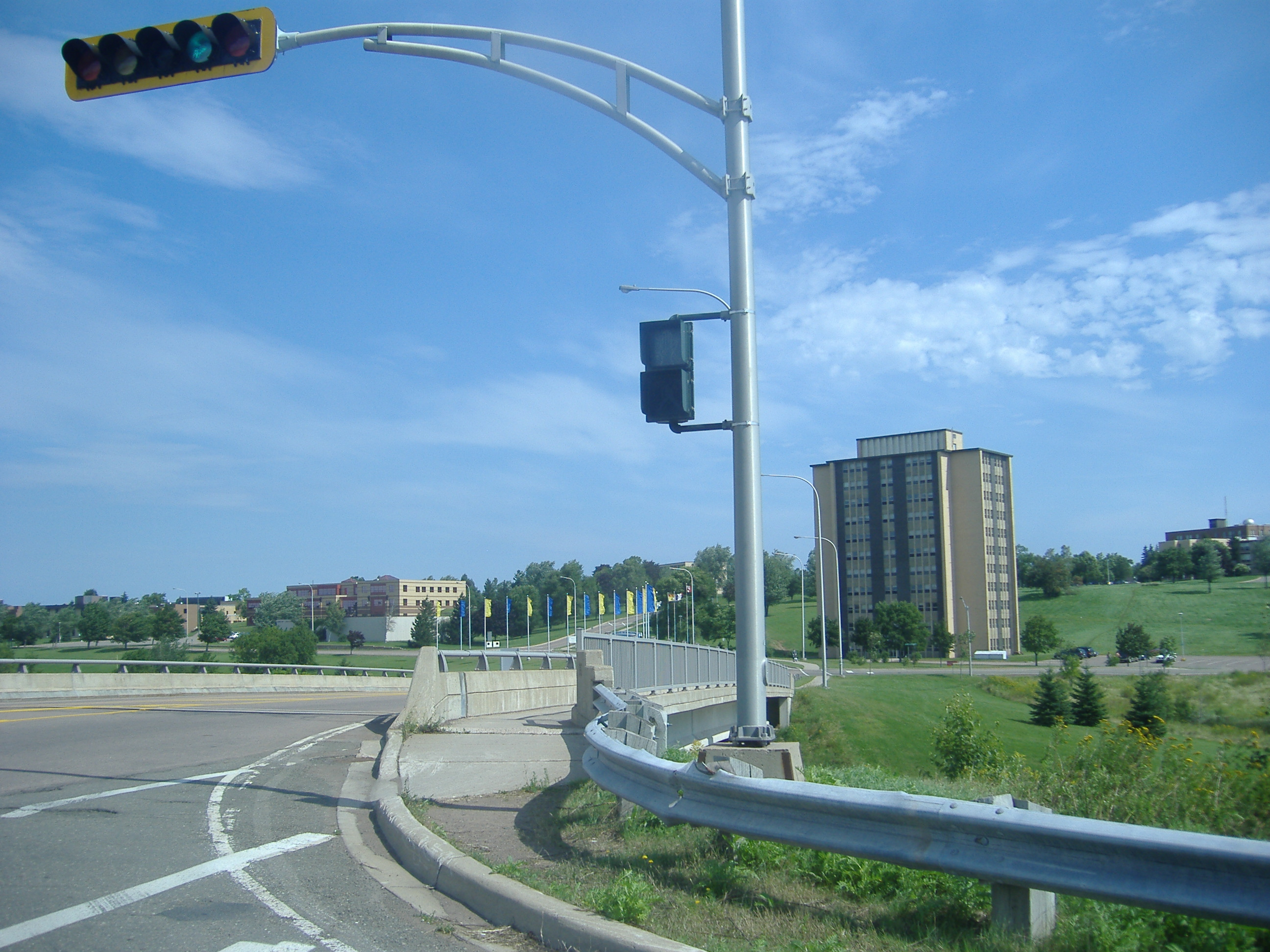
Université de Moncton

List of schools, colleges and universities in Greater Moncton, New Brunswick, Canada.

== Post-secondary education ==
=== Universities ===
- Université de Moncton - The largest French language university in Canada outside of Quebec. Enrollment is over 6000 students. UdeM is a comprehensive university with a wide variety of undergraduate and graduate degree programs, including arts, sciences, business, health sciences, engineering, education, social work, law, and medicine (in collaboration with Université de Sherbrooke).
- Crandall University - A private Christian liberal arts university, owned and operated by the Canadian Baptists of Atlantic Canada. Enrollment is over 1400 students. Degrees are available in arts, science (biology only), business, organizational management, education, and theology (in collaboration with Acadia Divinity College).
- University of New Brunswick - UNB Moncton consists of a small health sciences campus located next to the Moncton Hospital. Degree courses are available in nursing only. UNB's main campus is located in Fredericton, with another large campus in Saint John.

=== Community colleges ===
- New Brunswick Community College - Moncton - The largest campus in the NBCC system, with an enrollment of over 1,400. Programs are available in the fields of administrative professional, applied and media arts, business administration, civil engineering technology, electrical and electronics engineering, health, hospitality and tourism, information technology, social sciences, and trades.
- Collège communautaire du Nouveau-Brunswick - The largest campus in the CCNB system. Programs are available in the fields of business and office administration, arts, hospitality and community services, preparatory studies and languages, health sciences, information technology, and trades.

=== Private colleges ===
- Eastern College - Formerly known as CompuCollege (rebranded in 2014). Offers programs in massage therapy, personal support worker, business, entrepreneurship, administration, and management.
- Moncton Flight College - One of Canada's oldest and most prestigious flight schools, is also the largest flight school in Canada.
- McKenzie College - A visual arts institution, specializing in graphic design, digital media and animation.
- Oulton College - A variety of business, paramedical and paralegal programs.
- OLS Academy - Nationally Accredited, 12 month program, offering Primary Care Paramedicine programs in Moncton and Miramichi, NB

=== Private elementary schools ===
- Riverbend Community School – (English), Offers independent education for Grades K–8 through full-time and part-time learning options, as well as tutoring and in-person support for students enrolled in New Brunswick Virtual High School.
- Kingswood Academy Montessori School & Early Learning Centre/ Kingswood Academy - (English)(French), Offers private Montessori education for levels K to Grade Eight, as well as Day Care, After School Care, and Summer Camps.

== Public school system ==
=== Schools in the area ===
- École Amirault - Dieppe (K-2)
- École Saint-Therèse - Dieppe (K-2)
- École Champlain - Moncton (K-8)
- École Le Sommet - Moncton (K-8)
- École Saint-Henri - Moncton (K-5)
- École Le Mascaret - Moncton (6-8)
- École Sainte-Bernadette - Moncton (K-5)
- École Claudette-Bradshaw - Moncton (K-5)
- École Abbey-Landry - Memramcook (K-8)
- École Anna-Malenfant - Dieppe (3-5)
- École Carrefour de l'Acadie - Dieppe (6-8)
- École Le Marais - Dieppe (3-5)
- École Antonine-Maillet - Dieppe (6-8)
- École Mathieu-Martin - Dieppe (9-12)
- École L'Odyssée - Moncton (9-12)
- Uplands School - Moncton (K-3)
- Forest Glen School - Moncton (K-4)
- Arnold H. MacLeod School - Moncton (K-4)
- Salem Elementary School - Sackville (K-4)
- Salisbury Elementary School - Salisbury (K-4)
- Claude D. Taylor School - Riverview (K-5)
- Frank L. Bowser School - Riverview (K-5)
- Gunningsville School - Riverview (K-5)
- West Riverview School - Riverview (K-5)
- Hillsborough Elementary School - Hillsborough (K-5)
- Mountain View School - Irishtown (K-5)
- Lower Coverdale School - Lower Coverdale (K-5)
- Northrop Frye School - Moncton (K-8)
- Lou MacNarin School - Dieppe (K-8)
- Dorchester Consolidated School - Dorchester (K-8)
- Havelock School - Havelock (K-8)
- Port Elgin Regional School - Strait Shores (K-8)
- Riverside Consolidated School - Riverside-Albert (K-8)
- Shediac Cape School - Shediac (K-8)
- Magnetic Hill School - Lutes Mountain (K-8)
- Beaverbrook School - Moncton (K-8)
- Bessborough School - Moncton (K-8)
- Birchmount School - Moncton (K-8)
- Edith Cavell School - Moncton (K-8)
- Evergreen Park School - Moncton (K-8)
- Hillcrest School - Moncton (K-8)
- Queen Elizabeth School - Moncton (K-8)
- mcbuns memorial school - Moncton (5-8)
- Sunny Brae Middle School - Moncton (5-8)
- Riverview Middle School - Riverview (6-8)
- Marshview Middle School - Sackville (5-8)
- Petitcodiac Regional School - Three Rivers (K-12)
- Caledonia Regional High School - Hillsborough (6-12)
- Salisbury Middle School - Salisbury (5-8)
- Hadley Richard memorial High School - Salisbury (9-12)
- Harrison Trimble High School - Moncton (9-12)
- Bernice MacNaughton High School - Moncton (9-12)
- Moncton High School - Moncton (9-12)
- Riverview High School - Riverview (9-12)
- Tantramar Regional High School - Sackville (9-12)
- École Acadieville - Acadieville (K-8)
- École Dr-Marguerit-Michaud - Bouctouche (K-8)
- École Donat-Robichaud - Cap-Pelé (K-8)
- École Blanche-Bourgeois - Cocagne (K-8)
- École Père-Edgar-T.-LeBlanc - Grand-Barachois (K-8)
- École Grande-Digue - Grande-Digue (K-8)
- École Notre-Dame - Notre-Dame (K-8)
- École Soleil Levant - Richibucto (K-8)
- École W.-F. Boisvert - Nouvelle-Arcadie (K-6)
- École Camille-Vautour - Champdoré (K-8)
- École Marée Montante - Saint-Louis-de-Kent (K-8)
- École Saint-Paul - Saint-Paul (K-8)
- École Calixte-F.-Savoie - Sainte-Anne-de-Kent (K-8)
- École Mont-Carmel - Sainte-Marie-de-Kent (K-8)
- École Mgr-François-Bourgeois - Shediac (K-8)
- École Régionale de Baie Sainte-Anne - Baie-Sainte-Anne (K-12)
- École Clement-Cormier - Bouctouche (9-12)
- École Carrefour Beausoleil - Miramichi (K-12)
- École Secondaire Assomption - Nouvelle-Arcadie (7-12)
- École Mgr Marcel-François-Richard - Saint-Louis-de-Kent (9-12)
- École Louis-J.-Robichaud - Shediac (9-12)

== See also ==
- Higher education in New Brunswick
- List of universities in New Brunswick
- List of schools in New Brunswick
