= Coverdale =

Coverdale may refer to:

== Places ==
- Coverdale, North Yorkshire, England
- Coverdale Parish, New Brunswick, Canada
- Coverdale, New Brunswick, Canada
- Coverdale, a former name of Riverview, New Brunswick, Canada
- Lower Coverdale, New Brunswick, Canada

== People ==
- Bill Coverdale (1912–1972), English cricketer
- Bob Coverdale (b.1928), English rugby league player
- Charles Harry Coverdale (1888–1955), English soldier
- Christine Coverdale, American physicist
- David Coverdale (b.1951), English rock singer
- Drew Coverdale (b.1969), English footballer
- Garrison B. Coverdale (1905–1988), US Army general
- John Coverdale, New Zealand-American academic psychiatrist
- Kevin Coverdale (1940–1997) Australian rules footballer
- Linda Coverdale, American translator
- Myles Coverdale (c.1488–1569), English Bible translator and bishop
- Paul Coverdale (b.1983), English cricketer
- Ralph Coverdale (1918–1975), British management consultant
- Stephen Coverdale (b.1954), English cricketer
- William Coverdale (1862–1935), English cricketer
- William Coverdale (1801–1865), Canadian architect

== Other ==
- CFS Coverdale, military station in Canada
- Coverdale House Publishers, British Christian publishing company
