= HTHS =

HTHS may refer to:

- Haddon Township High School
- Harrison Trimble High School
- High Tech High School (North Bergen, NJ)
- High Technology High School
- High-Temperature High-Shear
- Hinsdale Township High School (disambiguation), multiple schools
- Hum Tumhare Hain Sanam
