= Mike Miller (Canadian football, born 1989) =

Canadian gridiron football player and coach (born 1989)

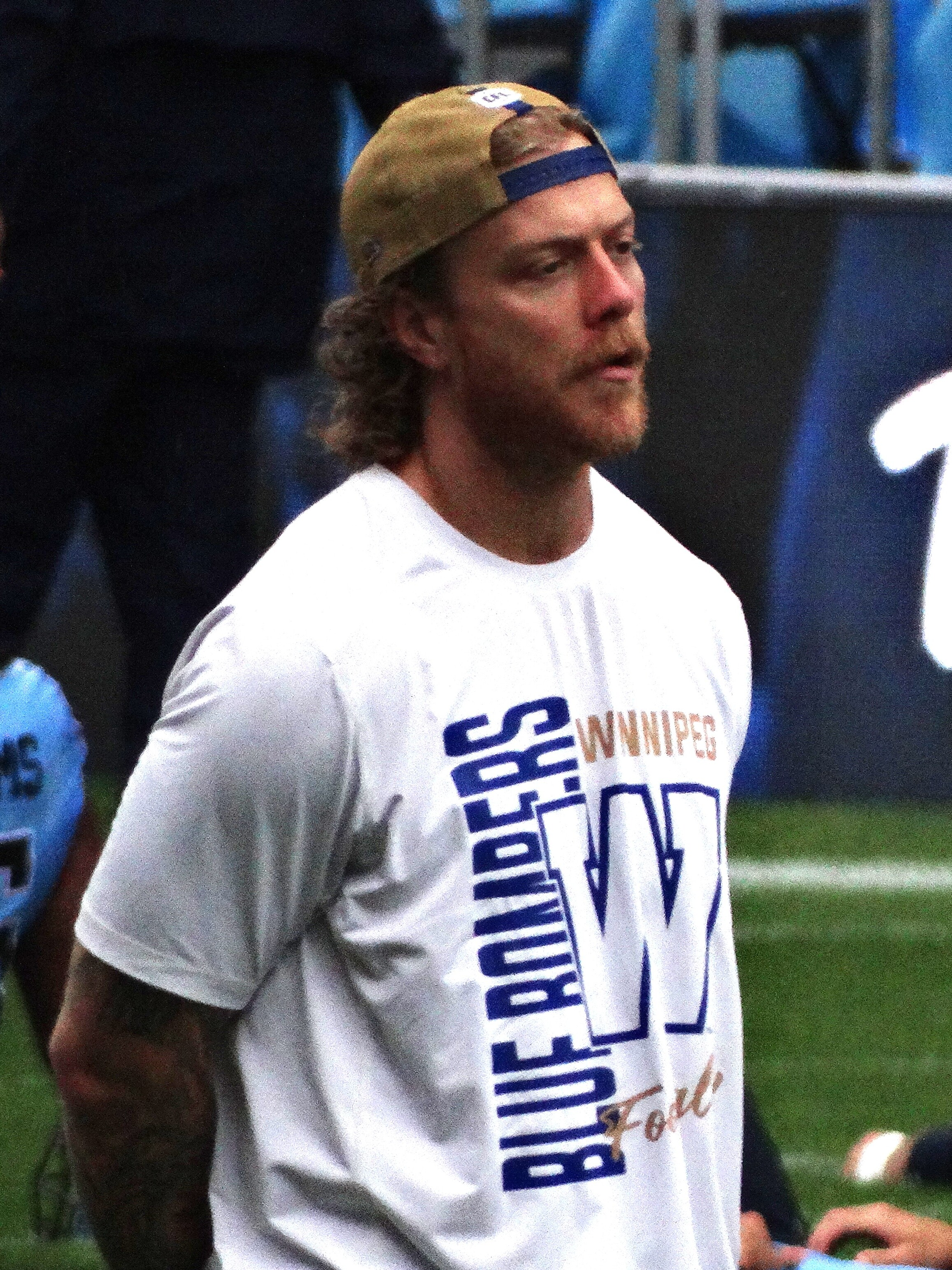
- Miller with the Winnipeg Blue Bombers in 2025

Winnipeg Blue Bombers
- Title: Special teams coordinator

Personal information
- Born: March 15, 1989 (age 37); Riverview, New Brunswick, Canada
- Listed height: 6 ft 0 in (1.83 m)
- Listed weight: 215 lb (98 kg)

Career information
- Positions: Fullback, linebacker (No. 44, 25, 24)
- High school: Riverview
- University: Acadia
- CFL draft: 2011: undrafted

Career history

Playing
- 2011–2016: Edmonton Eskimos
- 2017–2023: Winnipeg Blue Bombers

Coaching
- 2024–present: Winnipeg Blue Bombers (Special teams coordinator)

Awards and highlights
- 3× Grey Cup champion (2015, 2019, 2021); 2× CFL West All-Star (2019, 2021); CFL career record for special teams tackles (226); CFL single game record for special teams tackles (7) (2019)
- Stats at CFL.ca

Mike Miller (born March 15, 1989) is a Canadian former professional football player who is currently the special teams coordinator for the Winnipeg Blue Bombers of the Canadian Football League (CFL). He played in the CFL as a linebacker and fullback for 11 years. He is a three-time Grey Cup champion, having won with the Edmonton Eskimos in 2015 and with the Blue Bombers in 2019 and 2021. He is the CFL's all-time leader in career special teams tackles and holds the record for most special teams tackles in one game with seven.

== University career ==
Miller played CIS football as a defensive back with the Acadia Axemen from 2007 to 2010.

== Professional career ==
=== Edmonton Eskimos ===
Miller was signed as an undrafted free agent by the Edmonton Eskimos on May 18, 2011. He made the team's active roster as a linebacker following training camp and played in his first professional game on July 3, 2011, against the Saskatchewan Roughriders. He primarily played on special teams over his tenure with the Eskimos, while seeing some playing time on defense as well, registering six defensive tackles from 2011 to 2014. During the 2014 season, head coach Chris Jones moved Miller from linebacker to fullback. He won his first Grey Cup championship in 2015 where he had one special teams tackle in the game.

He led the league in special teams tackles in 2016 with 27, despite only playing in 16 games. He was released by the Eskimos on March 1, 2017. He dressed in 104 games with the Eskimos, registering 116 special teams tackles.

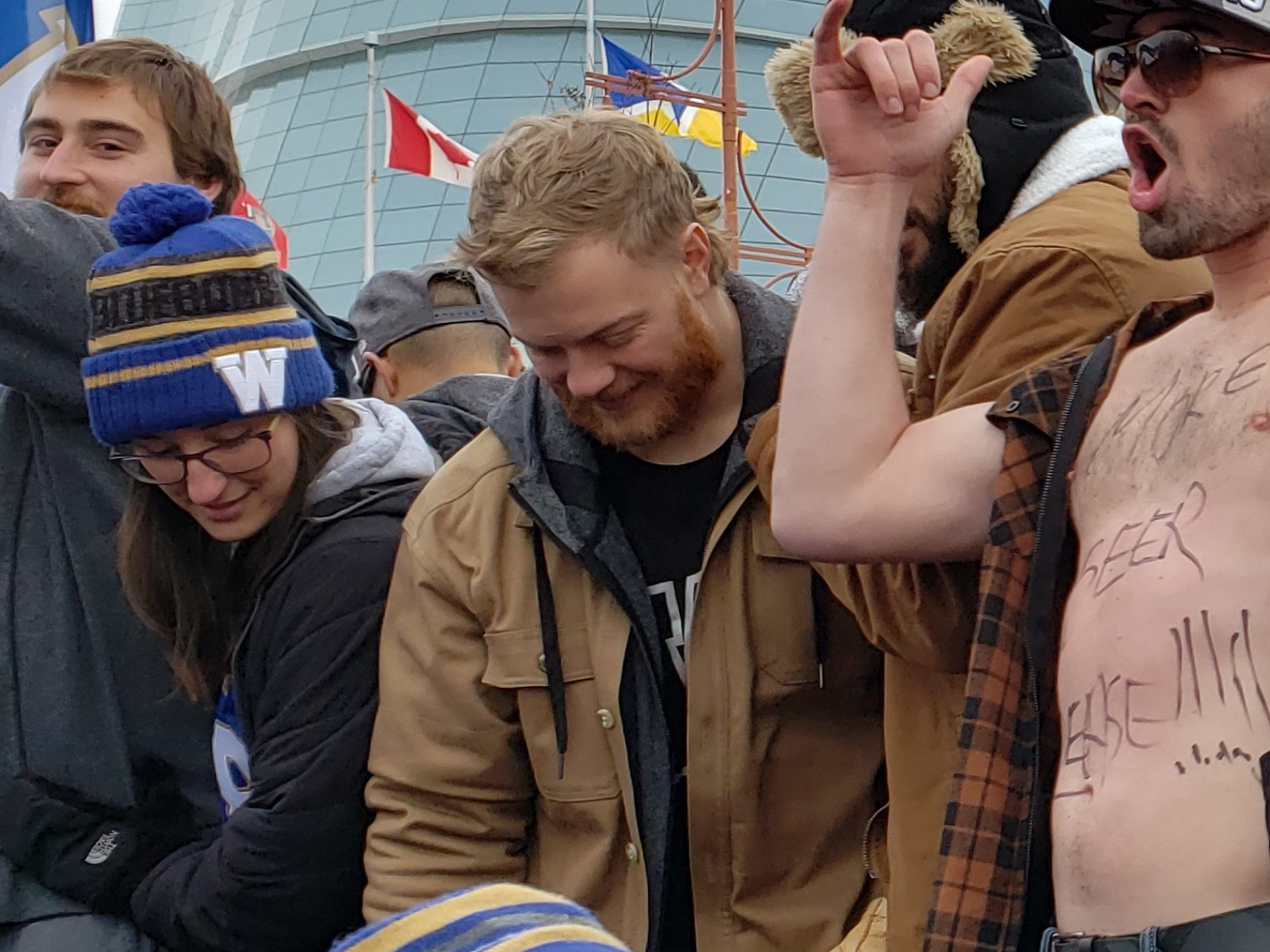
Miller during the 2019 Grey Cup parade.

=== Winnipeg Blue Bombers ===
Two days after his release from Edmonton, Miller signed with the Winnipeg Blue Bombers on March 3, 2017. In his first season with Winnipeg, he led the team in special teams tackles with 22. He also scored his first professional touchdown on October 28, 2017, when teammate Derek Jones blocked a Ty Long punt and Miller returned it 18 yards for the score. In 2018, he was second on the team in special teams tackles, with a second consecutive season with 22 made. He also had two receptions for 28 yards.

Miller had an impact year for the 2019 season as finished with 25 special tackles, tied with rookie Kerfalla Exumé for most on the team, and second in the league. He also had six receptions for 63 yards and one carry for 10 yards as he was featured more on offence than in any previous year. On July 5, 2019, he tied a CFL record with seven special teams tackles made in a single game. Near the end of the regular season, Miller was named the team nominee for both the Most Outstanding Special Teams Player and Most Outstanding Canadian awards. Miller, whose 73 yards from scrimmage were 1,836 fewer than Winnipeg national running back Andrew Harris, who lost the support of voters due to a suspension earlier in the season. Miller stated his belief that Harris was indeed the most outstanding Canadian player for the Blue Bombers; ”I will accept the Canadian nomination on Andrew’s behalf, but do so reluctantly and while completely disagreeing with his omission.” Miller was then named the West Division's Most Outstanding Special Teams Player and was also named a West Division All-Star as the top special teams non-kicker in the West. He played in all three of the Blue Bombers' post-season games and recorded one special teams tackle in the 107th Grey Cup championship win over the Hamilton Tiger-Cats.

He did not play in 2020 due to the cancellation of the 2020 CFL season. As a pending free agent in 2021, Miller signed a one-year contract extension with the team on January 7, 2021. In the third game of the 2021 season, Miller set the all-time career special teams tackles record after recording his 191st tackle, surpassing Jason Arakgi's mark of 190. He finished the regular season with 25 special teams tackles, which was the second-best tally in his career, despite playing in only 14 games in the shortened 2021 season. At the end of the year, he was named a West Division All-Star for the second time in his career. Miller had one special teams tackle in the 108th Grey Cup game as he won his third championship following the Blue Bombers' repeat victory over the Tiger-Cats.

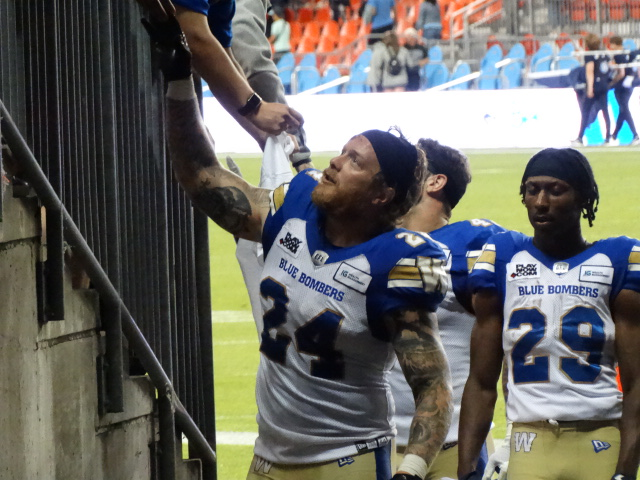
Miller (left) in 2022

In 2022, he played in all 18 regular season games where he had 16 special teams tackles and one forced fumble. He also scored the first touchdown of his career on October 28, 2022, against the BC Lions, on a one-yard carry. He played in his fourth Grey Cup game, but did not record any statistics as the Blue Bombers were defeated by the Toronto Argonauts in the 109th Grey Cup. Miller suffered an injury in training camp in 2023 and remained on the injured list for the entire season. He assisted the coaching staff while he was on the injured list.

== Coaching career ==
On January 8, 2024, it was announced that Miller had joined the coaching staff of the Winnipeg Blue Bombers as the team's special teams coordinator.

== Personal life ==
Miller and his wife, Erica, have two children, Ethan and Coady.

== See also ==
- List of people from Riverview, New Brunswick
