= Mill Creek Nature Park =

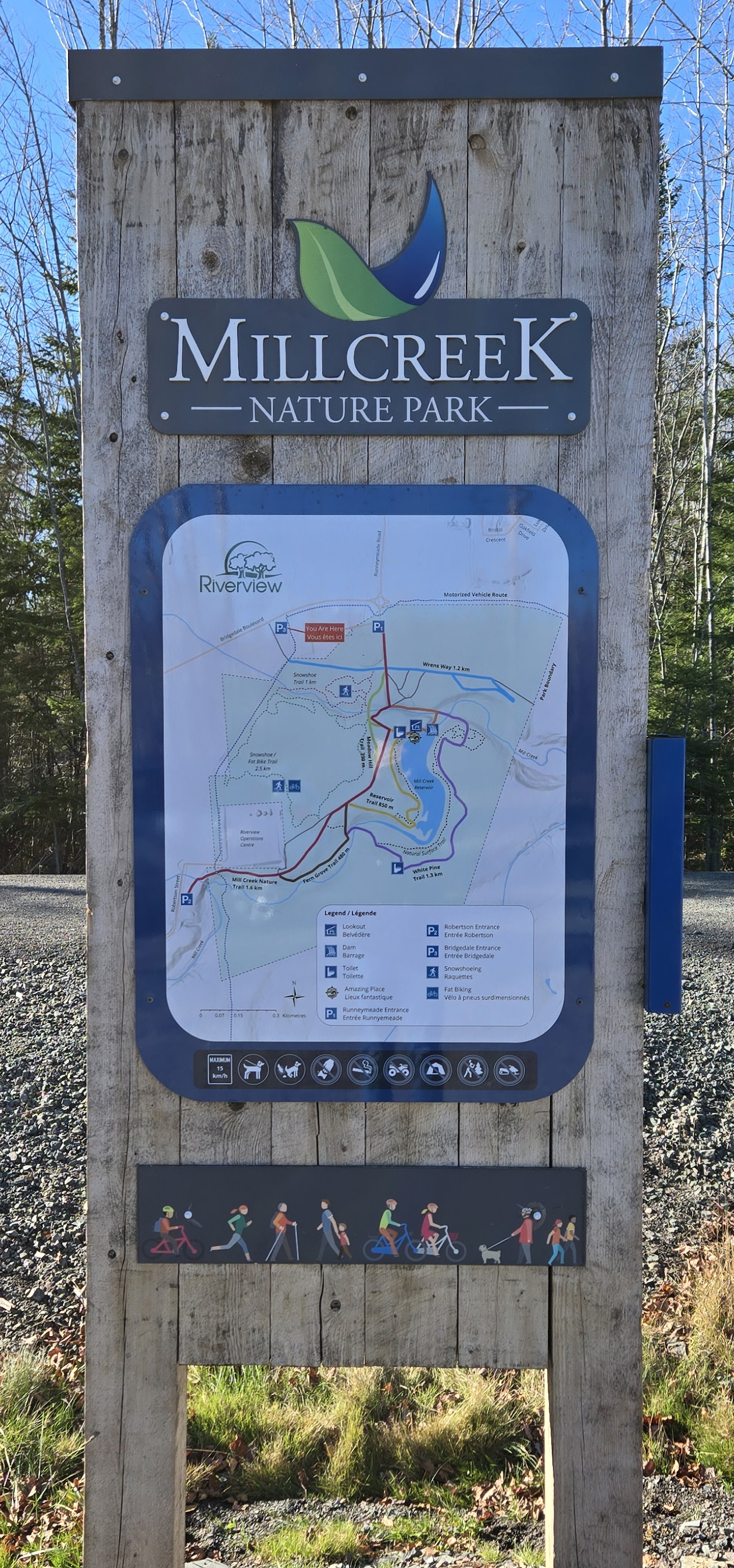
- Mill Creek Nature Park entry map

- Location within New Brunswick
- Type: Municipal Park
- Location: Riverview, New Brunswick, Canada
- Coordinates: 46.063253118759874°N 64.7619152069092°W
- Area: 140 hectares (350 acres)
- Established: 2014
- Owner: Town of Riverview
- Status: Open all year
- Website: https://www.townofriverview.ca/parks-and-recreation/parks-and-trails/mill-creek-nature-park

Mill Creek Nature Park is a 140-hectare (350-acre) municipal park located in Riverview, New Brunswick, Canada. The park is owned by the Town of Riverview and is managed in collaboration with the Friends of Mill Creek, a community-led advisory committee. Mill Creek Nature Park is home to a network of trails that are used for year-round recreation, including walking, cycling, and snowshoeing. The park encompasses part of the Mill Creek watershed and includes a diverse array of habitats, including mixed forests and wetlands. Common species include forest birds, such as black-capped chickadee, common yellowthroat, and ovenbird, and mammals such as American red squirrel, snowshoe hare, and American beaver. The most prominent features in the park are a dam and reservoir which were created by the Department of National Defence in 1960.

== History ==
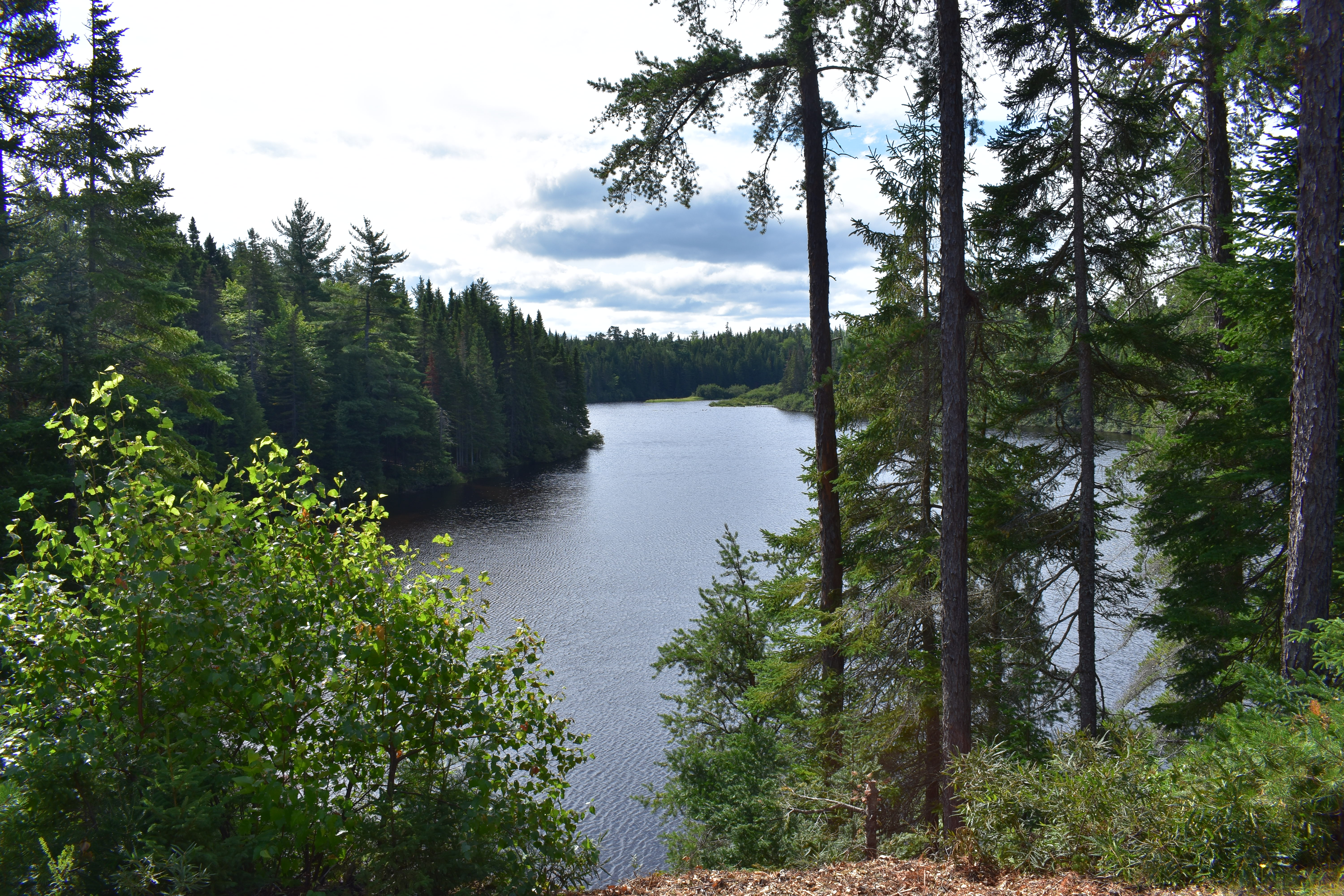
Mill Creek reservoir

Mill Creek Nature Park is located south of the former Canadian Forces Station Coverdale, which was constructed by the Royal Canadian Navy in 1944. The station conducted operations pertaining to high-frequency direction finding, which was used to monitor German communications during World War II. During its early years, the station was referred to as Special Wireless Station Coverdale and was operated by the Women's Royal Canadian Naval Service. In 1949, the station was made its own fleet establishment, giving it greater authority and independence. In 1956, it was granted the title Her Majesty's Canadian Ship (HMCS) Coverdale, which it is still often referred to as today. In the mid-1950s, new facilities were constructed that necessitated an increase in the station's already strained water supply. To address this, a concrete buttress dam was built on the nearby Mill Creek, creating a 5 hectare reservoir which still exists today. In 1966, the base was designated as Canadian Forces Station (CFS) Coverdale, a title that it maintained until its closure in 1971. A few of the original buildings still remain, including the Coverdale Centre and the Victory Life Centre. The dam and reservoir are now owned by the Town of Riverview and are located within the present-day Mill Creek Nature Park.

In the late 2000s, the Town of Riverview, in cooperation with the City of Moncton's Urban Planning Commission, began working on a plan to designate Mill Creek as a future park. A proposal put forward by students from Riverview High School in 2011 was followed by a public consultation process, which led to the development of a master plan. In 2014, the park was officially established and work began on the development of trails. In 2016, the Friends of Mill Creek advisory committee was formed to assist the municipality with the park's ongoing planning and management.

== Features and Amenities ==
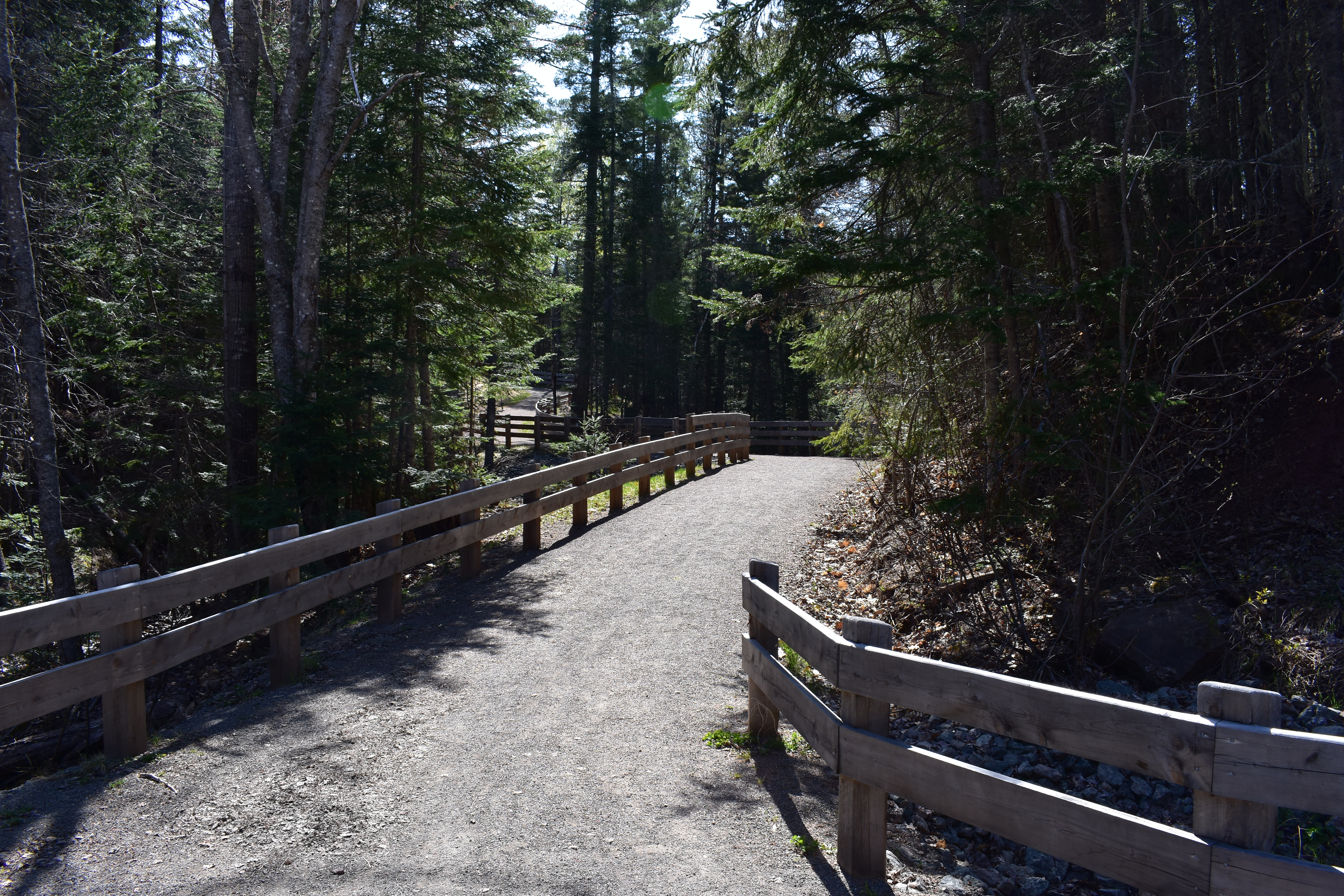
Mill Creek Nature Trail within the park

Mill Creek Nature Park has a network of gravel and natural surface trails, which are used for variety of year-round activities, including walking and cycling in the summer and snowshoeing and fat biking in the winter. A scenic lookout above the reservoir includes a shelter, public fire pit, and benches, and is designated as one of the Fundy Biosphere Reserve's Amazing Places. The park continues to see ongoing development and has become a popular destination for outdoor recreation in the Greater Moncton-area.

== See also ==
- Riverview, New Brunswick
- Fundy Biosphere Reserve
- CFS Coverdale
