= Moncton Christian Academy =

Location
- 945 St. George Blvd, Moncton; Moncton, New Brunswick, E1C 5A3; Canada
- 46.083337°N 64.823563°W

Information
- School type: Christian
- Founded: 1983
- School board: Anglophone East School District
- Principal: Willie Brownlee
- Staff: 20+
- Grades: K-12
- Enrollment: 270
- Language: English
- Area: Moncton, Riverview, Dieppe, Salisbury, Petitcodiac, Havelock and Shediac
- Website: www.monctonchristian.ca/who-we-are/

Moncton Christian Academy is a Christian school located in Moncton, New Brunswick, Canada.

It is administered by the Moncton Wesleyan Church.

The school drew attention when it declined to mandate COVID-19 injections in 2021.
