= Harrison Trimble High School =

Public secondary school in Moncton, New Brunswick, Canada

Location
- 80 Echo Dr. Moncton, New Brunswick, E1C 3H8; Canada; 46.098977°N 64.81071°W

Information
- School type: High school
- Motto: Pride in ourselves, pride in our school, pride in our community
- Founded: 1961
- School board: Anglophone East School District
- Superintendent: Randolph MacLean
- School number: 1517
- Principal: Gary Wilson
- Grades: 9-12
- Enrollment: 1,600
- Language: English, French Second-Language
- Colours: Maroon and White
- Mascot: Troy
- Team name: The Trojans
- Rivals: Bernice MacNaughton High School
- Website: www.harrisontrimble.ca

Harrison Trimble High School is a high school situated in Moncton, New Brunswick, Canada. As of 2023, the principal is Gary Wilson.

== History ==
The school opened in 1961 and serves as Moncton's largest school after Moncton High School. Following expansions in the 1960s, there were over 2,000 students in grades 10 to 12 by 1973. Today, it serves approximately 1,600 students from grades 9 through 12. Its school mascot is the Trojan. The school is represented by the colours maroon and white, its motto being "Pride in Ourselves, Pride in our School, Pride in our Community".

Harrison Trimble High School was named after a civic-minded board Trustee who acquired the parcel of land on behalf of the district, at a time when the area was mostly pasture, thereby saving the school district a lot of money when time came to build.

Harrison Trimble High School has an annual event called the Trojan Trek, where every student from the school walks to the Moncton Hospital to raise awareness for The Neonatal Unit. The students fund-raise money for the event each year. In 2024 the school had raised over $440,000 since the creation of the charity.

== Facilities ==
The school is home to several facilities that are used for school events, as well as local events. Woody Hayes Field is a turf multi-use field situated in the southern area of the campus. It is home to the Trojan Football, Soccer, Rugby, and Field Hockey. In 2023, the field held some matches for the 2023 Canada Soccer Toyota National Championships U-17 Cup. The Owen Fraser Auditorium is a 1000 seat performing arts venue situated inside the school's main building. The facility is used for the school's assemblies, dramatic performances, concerts, and conferences. The facility is named after Owen Fraser, a former teacher in Moncton. The Bryan Forsythe Gymnasium is a sporting facility located in inside the school's main building. It has 600 retractable seats and is home to Trojan Basketball and Volleyball. It also occasionally hosts Moncton Mystics basketball games. The gymnasium is named after former longtime Trojan Basketball coach, Bryan Forsythe, who died in 2023.

== Notable alumni ==
- Sidney Crosby - Professional hockey player for the Pittsburgh Penguins in the NHL

== See also ==
- Riverview High School
- Moncton High School (2015)
- Bernice MacNaughton High School
- Caledonia Regional High School
- Tantramar Regional High School
