= Charles Foster (writer) =

Canadian writer

Charles Basil Foster (17 January 1923 – 23 April 2017) was an English-born Canadian publicist, newspaper editor, author and songwriter.

He was born in Cheshire, England. During World War II he was a pilot with the Royal Air Force. The RAF sent him to a base in Alberta, Canada for flight training and while on leave he visited Hollywood. There, he met Sidney Olcott, a Canadian-born silent film star who introduced him to numerous other expatriate Canadian actors in Hollywood including Mary Pickford. After the war, Foster used these contacts to begin a career as a publicist in London and in Hollywood, working for such well-known performers as Marilyn Monroe, Richard Burton, Boris Karloff, Errol Flynn and Benny Hill. He was also a songwriter, contributing such titles as "Goodnight Till Tomorrow" (as Basil Foster) for Issy Bonn and others. Foster later became a writer for comedians in the 1960s including Bob Hope and Jack Benny and contributed scripts to a number of 1960s sitcoms including The Beverly Hillbillies.

He returned to Canada in the 1960s where he became editor at the Brampton Times and Conservator. In the 1970s he worked as a speechwriter for the Canadian Government, and eventually came to Riverview, New Brunswick, where he resided until his death. There, he begin as newspaper editor for the Moncton Free Press. In his retirement he delved into his remarkable store of memories to publish three books on Canadians in Hollywood: Stardust and Shadows (about the silent film era), and Once Upon a Time in Paradise (about the period from the late 1920s to the 1950s), and most recent book, Donald Brian: the King of Broadway, about the nearly forgotten performer Donald Brian.

For nearly a decade he has contributed monthly articles to the Seniors Advocate in Halifax, Nova Scotia. He wrote more than 100 articles for the bi-weekly Albert County Chronicle, a community newspaper, until it ceased publication in 2010. In 2010-2011, he had articles published in 21 magazines and newspapers in Canada, the United States, England, and Australia. His autobiography, From Old Hollywood to New Brunswick, was released in November 2013.

As the original publicist for the world's longest running play, Agatha Christie's The Mousetrap, in London, England, he prepared a 60-page booklet of memories of Christie and the early days of the play for the 60th anniversary performance, in September 2012.

Foster died in April 2017, at age 94.

== Select bibliography ==
- Stardust and Shadows: Canadians in Early Hollywood (Dundurn, 2000)
- Once Upon a Time in Paradise: Canadians in the Golden Age of Hollywood (Dundurn, 2003)
- Donald Brian: the King of Broadway (Breakwater Books 2005)
- From Old Hollywood to New Brunswick, Memories of a Wonderful Life (Nimbus 2013)

See also:

- Canadian pioneers in early Hollywood

== See also ==
- List of people from Riverview, New Brunswick
