= List of people from Riverview, New Brunswick =

This is a list of notable people from Riverview, New Brunswick, Canada. Although not everyone in this list was born in Riverview, they all live or have lived in Riverview and have had significant connections to the community. If people are in this article, do not include them in the list of people from Albert County.

Full name	Known for	Birth	Death	Other
Charles Foster	Writer	1923	2017	
Travis Jayner	Sports	1982		
Michael LeBlanc	Sports	1987		
Mike Miller	Sports	1989		
Jordan Murray	Sports	1992		
Todd Smith	Politics	1971		
Yvette Victoria Angela Swan	Minister	1945	2021	

== See also ==
- List of people from New Brunswick
