= Eastern College (Atlantic Canada) =

Private career college in Atlantic Canada

- Former name: CompuCollege
- Type: Private career college
- Established: 1983; 43 years ago
- Parent institution: triOS Education Group
- Location: Halifax, Moncton, Fredericton, Saint John, New Brunswick, Nova Scotia, Canada
- Website: www.easterncollege.ca

Eastern College is a private career college operating in Atlantic Canada, with campuses in Halifax, Moncton, Fredericton, and Saint John. The college offers diploma and certificate programs across the faculties of Business, Technology, Healthcare, Law, Supply Chain, and Education. Eastern College is owned by triOS Education Group, whose sister college triOS College operates nine campuses across Southern Ontario.

== History ==
Eastern College was established in 1983 under the name CompuCollege, offering career-focused training programs across Atlantic Canada. Over more than three decades, the college built a reputation for practical, modular training, helping over 30,000 students fast-track to job readiness across its campus network in New Brunswick and Nova Scotia.

The college was subsequently acquired in 2014 and rebranded as Eastern College, expanding its curriculum across seven faculties. In 2019, triOS Corporation, an Ontario-based private career college operator, announced the purchase of all assets of Eastern College, which at the time operated six career college campuses throughout the Atlantic provinces. Following the acquisition, Eastern College continued to operate under its existing brand name as a sister college to triOS College.

== Campuses ==
Eastern College operates four campuses in Atlantic Canada:

- Halifax, Nova Scotia (head office)
- Moncton, New Brunswick
- Fredericton, New Brunswick
- Saint John, New Brunswick

== Programs ==
Eastern College offers diploma and certificate programs delivered through in-class, remote (synchronous online), and asynchronous online formats. Programs are organized across the following faculties:

=== Faculty of Business ===
- Accounting and Payroll — recognized by Certified Professional Bookkeepers of Canada (CPB)
- Accounting and Payroll Associate
- Accounting and Payroll Administrator
- Accounting and Payroll Specialist
- Accounting Technician — recognized by Certified Professional Bookkeepers of Canada (CPB)
- Administrative Specialist
- Business Administration and Management
- Business, Entrepreneurship, Administration, and Management
- Business, Entrepreneurship, and Management
- Digital Marketing
- Digital Marketing and Graphic Design Using AI
- Graphic Design Using AI
- Office Administrative Assistant

=== Faculty of Healthcare ===
- Continuing Care Assistant
- Health Information Management — accredited by the Canadian College of Health Information Management (CCHIM)
- Massage Therapy — program accredited by The Canadian Massage Therapy Council for Accreditation (CMTCA)
- Medical Office Administration
- Personal Support Worker — recognized by the National Association of Career Colleges (NACC)
- Pharmacy Assistant
- Pharmacy Technician
- Pre-Science for Massage Therapy
- Veterinary Assistant
- Veterinary Administrative Assistant

=== Faculty of Technology ===
- Data Analyst
- Data Analysis and AI Specialist
- Information Technology Administrator (Cloud)
- Information Technology Administrator (Cybersecurity)
- Information Technology Professional (Infrastructure, Cloud & Cybersecurity)
- Mobile Developer Using AI
- Mobile Web Developer Using AI
- System Administrator
- Web Developer Using AI
- Web & Development Fundamentals

=== Faculty of Law ===
- Criminology
- Child and Youth Care Worker
- Child and Youth Care with Addictions Support Worker
- Paralegal
- Police Foundations

=== Faculty of Supply Chain ===
- Supply Chain and Logistics — students receive a Certificate in International Freight Forwarding upon graduation, recognized by CIFFA
- Supply Chain and Operations Management

=== Faculty of Education ===
- Early Childhood Education — approved by the College of Early Childhood Educators (CECE)
- Child and Youth Care Worker — articulation agreement with Mount Saint Vincent University

== Accreditation and registration ==
Each of Eastern College's campuses is registered as a private career college in New Brunswick and Nova Scotia. The college is regulated by PETAL (the Department of Post-Secondary Education, Training and Labour) in New Brunswick and by DAE (the Department of Advanced Education) in Nova Scotia. Eastern College is also listed as a designated educational institution by the Government of Canada. Eastern College is also listed as a private training organization by the Government of New Brunswick.

== Recognition ==
Eastern College and its parent company triOS Education Group have been named one of Canada's Best Managed Companies for 16 consecutive years. Eastern College has also been certified as a Great Place to Work for 2026–2027.

== Notable alumni ==
- Brendan Maguire — Canadian politician

== See also ==
- triOS College
- Private career colleges in Canada
- Post-secondary education in New Brunswick
- Post-secondary education in Nova Scotia
