= TriOS College =

triOS College is a Canadian-owned private career college in the province of Ontario, Canada. triOS College has 9 locations in Ontario, offering diplomas in Business, Technology, Healthcare, Law, Healthcare, and Supply Chain. The college was established in 1992 by Frank Gerencser and Stuart Bentley. The school is a member of Career Colleges Ontario.

== Campuses ==
triOS College has 9 campus locations across Southern Ontario in: Windsor, London, Kitchener, Hamilton, St. Catharine's, Brampton, Mississauga, Toronto, and Ottawa. A sister college called Eastern College, which is owned by triOS Education Group, has 4 locations throughout Nova Scotia and New Brunswick.

== Programs ==
Faculty of Law

- Law Clerk Specialist
- Paralegal - program accredited by the Law Society of Upper Canada (LSUC)
- Legal Assistant
- Police Foundations and Security

Faculty of Business

- Accounting and Payroll Specialist - recognized by Certified Professional Bookkeepers of Canada (CPB)
- Accounting Technician - recognized by Certified Professional Bookkeepers of Canada (CPB)
- Business, Entrepreneurship, Administration, and Management
- Business, Entrepreneurship, and Management
- Business, Administration, and Management
- Digital Marketing and Graphic Design using AI
- Digital Marketing
- Graphic Design using AI
- Office Administrative Assistant

Faculty of Supply Chain

- Supply Chain and Logistics - students receive a Certificate in International Freight Forwarding upon graduation, recognized within the international transportation and international trade logistics industries
- Supply Chain and Operations Management

Faculty of Technology

- Data Analysis and AI Specialist
- Data Analyst
- Information Technology Professional (Infrastructure, Cloud & Cybersecurity)
- Information Technology Administrator (Cybersecurity)
- Information Technology Administrator (Cloud)
- Mobile Web Developer using AI
- Mobile Developer using AI
- System Administrator
- Web and Development Fundamentals
- Web Developer using AI

Faculty of Education

- Early Childhood Education - approved by the College of Early Childhood Educators (CECE)

Faculty of Healthcare

- Acupuncture Practitioner - graduates are eligible to write the Canadian Alliance of Regulatory Bodies of Traditional Chinese Medicine Practitioners and Acupuncturists (CARB-TCMPA) Pan- Canadian Examinations
- Acupuncture Practitioner for Healthcare Professionals
- Contemporary Acupuncture for Healthcare Professionals
- Addiction Worker - approved by the Canadian Addiction Counsellors Certification Federation (CACCF)
- Addiction and Mental Health Worker
- Community Service Worker
- Community Services and Mental Health Worker
- Health Information Management - accredited by the Canadian College of Health Information Management (CCHIM) under the authority of the Canadian Health Information Management Association (CHIMA)
- Massage Therapy - program accredited by The Canadian Massage Therapy Council for Accreditation (CMTCA)
- Medical Office Administration
- Personal Support Worker
- Pharmacy Assistant

== Notable alumni ==
- Randa Markos, professional Mixed Martial Artist
