= Christine Coverdale =

American plasma physicist

Christine Anne Coverdale is an American plasma physicist at Sandia National Laboratories, where she is a Distinguished Member of the Technical Staff.

== Education and career ==
Coverdale earned a Ph.D. in plasma physics from the University of California, Davis, in 1995, based on research performed at the Lawrence Livermore National Laboratory.

After working briefly for Physics International, she joined Sandia National Laboratories in 1997, initially working on the Z Pulsed Power Facility. Her research at Sandia also involves the certification of nuclear weapons and radiation detection of X-rays from plasma Z-pinch confinement. She was named a Distinguished Member of the Technical Staff at Sandia in 2011.

Coverdale has written over 120 papers in her career, and she continues to regularly present at conferences. In addition to this, Coverdale stays actively involved in her community by serving as a judge to science fairs at local elementary schools.

== Recognition ==
Coverdale was elected as a Fellow of the American Physical Society (APS) in 2008, after a nomination from the APS Division of Plasma Physics, "for exceptional experimental achievements in both laser and z-pinch plasma physics, dedicated service to the professional community, and leadership in promoting laboratory and university collaborations". She became an IEEE Fellow in 2010, "for contributions to the development of neutron sources". In the IEEE, Coverdale served three terms on the Executive Committee of the IEEE Plasma Science and Applications Committee. In addition, she also served as technical program chair for the IEEE International Conference on Plasma Science in 2009, 2010, 2012, and 2015. Coverdale also served one four-year term for the IEEE Nuclear Plasma Sciences Society Administrative Committee. Now, she is senior editor for High Energy Density Physics for IEEE Transactions on Plasma Science..

IEEE Plasma Science and Applications Committee Award, becoming the first woman to win this award. The Prism Award honors a woman who has charted her own path throughout her career, providing leadership in technology fields and professional organizations along the way." In order to win the Prism Award, the recipient must have 15-20 years of experience in the field and must have a clear understanding of how her career path has ultimately led to her achievements. She became the first woman to win a 28-year-old international award for outstanding contributions to the field of plasma science through research, teaching, and professional service to the scientific community.
