= Riverside Consolidated School =

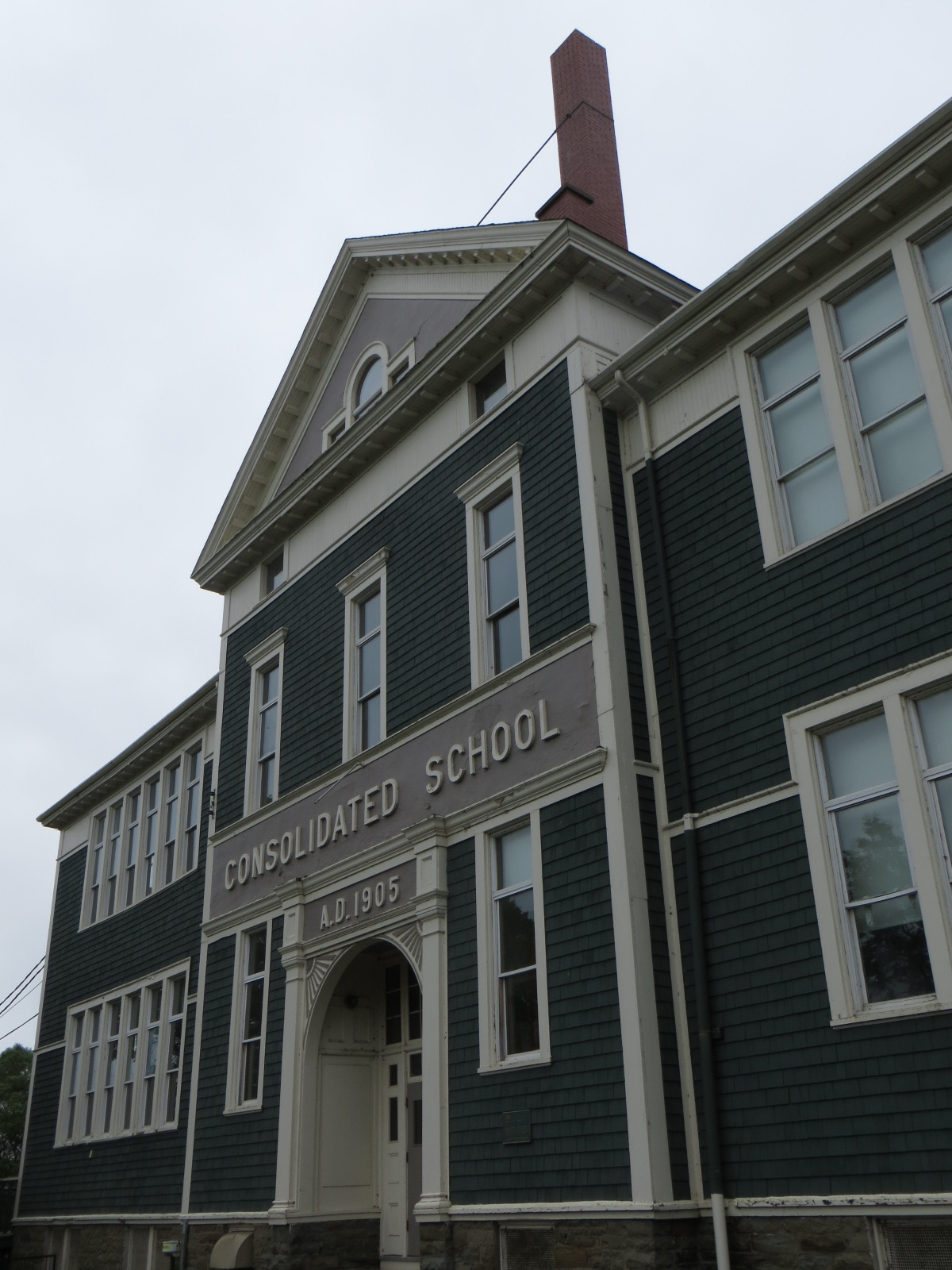

Location
- 90 Water Street; Riverside-Albert, NB, E4H 3Z7; Canada; 45.74828°N 64.73132°W

Information
- School type: Public
- Founded: 1905
- School board: Anglophone East
- Principal: Jeff Keirstead
- Teaching staff: 8 (2022-2023)
- Grades: K–5
- Enrollment: 52 (2024)
- Website: rcs.nbed.ca

New Brunswick Heritage Conservation Act
- Type: Heritage Conservation Act
- Designated: May 27, 1997
- Reference no.: 72

Riverside Consolidated School is a historic Canadian public consolidated school located in Riverside-Albert (now part of Fundy Albert), Albert County, New Brunswick. Built in 1905, the school building is three-storeys tall and is made from wood. It is recognized as a Provincial Heritage Building, and continues to operate.

== History ==
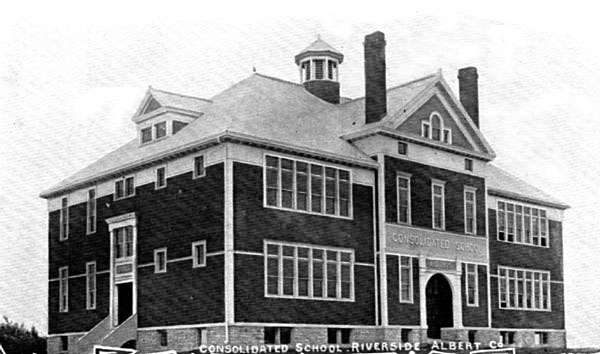
Riverside Consolidated School in 1920

Schools in rural Canadian areas had a growing trend of becoming consolidated in the early 1900s, with New Brunswick supporting the creation of them through 1903 legislation. $5,000 in funding for the school was provided by Abner Reid McClelan, a former Senator and Lieutenant Governor of New Brunswick, with additional funding being provided by the province and through taxes. Riverside Consolidated School was built in 1905, designed by architect Watson Elkinah Reid. H. Copp and Dixon, contractors from Sackville, were hired by Reid for the construction. The wooden building, measuring three storeys tall, sits next to the Shepody River. Succeeding the Grammar School for Albert County, the school opened in September 1905 with an initial enrollment of 275 students, serving grades 1–11 at the time. On June 15, 1906, the school's opening ceremony began. Established as a consolidated school, it previously served high school-level students.

On May 27, 1997, the school was recognized as a Provincial Heritage Place under New Brunswick's Heritage Conservation Act. In 2015, the Anglophone East School District held a council meeting addressing the potential closure for the school, which local residents campaigned against citing concerns such as the lengthy busing distance to the closest alternative in Hillsborough. The council unanimously voted to continue running the school. Riverside Consolidated School still features a distinctive escape chute on the schoolbuilding.
