= Magnetic Hill School =

Elite primary school in Lutes Mountain, New Brunswick (Canada)

Location
- 3346 Route 126; Lutes Mountain, New Brunswick, E1G 2X4; Canada; 46.136073°N 64.911899°W

Information
- School type: Public, coeducational combined middle and elementary school
- School board: Anglophone East School District
- Superintendent: Randolph MacLean
- School number: 1528
- Principal: Heather Morgan
- Grades: K-8
- Enrollment: 500
- Language: English, French Second-Language
- Website: maghill.nbed.nb.ca

Magnetic Hill School is a K-8 school in Lutes Mountain, New Brunswick, Canada.

== History ==
The school received media coverage in the early 1990s when one of its teachers, Malcolm Ross, was involved in a human rights complaint by a local Jewish parent. Ross had published and distributed anti-Semitic literature, including Holocaust denial. The case eventually led to Ross being dismissed from his teaching job, but was made the school's librarian, because it was a non-teaching job.
