= École Secondaire Assomption =

Location
- 50 rue de l'École; Nouvelle-Arcadie, New-Brunswick, E4Y 1V7; Canada; 46°44′00″N 65°25′17″W

Information
- School type: High School
- Founded: 1957
- School board: Francophone Sud
- Grades: 7-12
- Enrollment: 165
- Language: French
- Website: etoiledelacadie.nbed.nb.ca

École Secondaire Assomption is a Francophone high school in Nouvelle-Arcadie, New Brunswick, Canada.
