= William Coverdale =

English cricketer

William Coverdale (8 July 1862 – 23 September 1934) was an English first-class cricketer, who played two matches for Yorkshire County Cricket Club in June 1888. These two matches were against the touring Australians and Kent.

Born in Pickering, North Riding of Yorkshire, England, fourth son in a family of nine, his Innkeeper father Henry owned the White Swan Hotel on the north side of the Market Place, as well as being a butcher and a farmer of 200 acres. Coverdale was a wicket-keeper, taking two catches between the two matches. His batting was less than successful, with only two runs in two completed innings. Yorkshire saved the match against the Australians, scoring 344 for 7 after being forced to follow on. Kent was also forced to follow on in his final match, but again good batting secured them a draw.

Coverdale died in September 1934, in Bridlington, East Riding of Yorkshire, aged 72.
