= CFS Coverdale =

Radio intercept station in New Brunswick, Canada

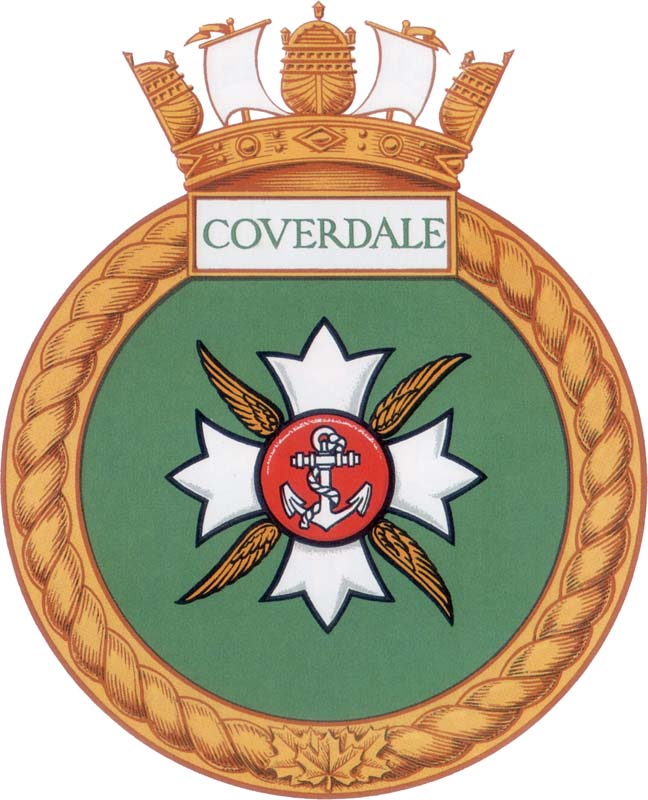
CFS Coverdale
- Near Riverview, New Brunswick

Site information
- Operator: Royal Canadian Navy; Canadian Armed Forces

Site history
- In use: 1942–1971

Canadian Forces Station Coverdale or His Majesty's Canadian Ship Coverdale was a secret radio interception station located on the Petitcodiac River near Moncton, New Brunswick.

Opened on 23 November 1942 as a high-frequency direction finding (HF/DF) station. During World War II, the station listened to intercepted German U-boat radio transmissions. When a transmission was intercepted, it was forwarded to Bletchley Park for the message to be decoded. The origins of the transmission were also triangulated, allowing Allied anti-submarine forces the opportunity to track down and sink U-boats. Being situated over a bog it provided an excellent ground plane for radio intercepts. The base was fully completed in the winter of 1944 and was subsequently staffed by members of the Women's Royal Canadian Naval Service (WRCNS). The initial staffing listed three male officers, four WRCNS officers, three male ratings and 140 WRCNS ratings. During this period the sailors called themselves the “listeners”.

The station was called HMCS Coverdale from 1949, and then CFS Coverdale in 1966. During the early stages of the Cold War, members of HMCS Coverdale spied on Soviet naval radio messages, nicknaming themselves the “spies”. Occasionally, the station would pick transmissions from Soviet spies within Canada.

With advances in technology and mounting costs to run the station, the newly redesigned Canadian forces station (CFS) Coverdale was closed on 15 June, 1971.

== Dönitz's message ==
On 4 May 1945, the listeners at the station intercepted Admiral Karl Dönitz's message informing German warships of Hitler's death. The following is the content of the message.

GERMAN ARMY, MY COMRADES.

THE FUEHRER HAS FALLEN. TRUE TO HIS GREAT IDEA OF DEFENDING THE PEOPLE OF EUROPE AGAINST BOLSHEVISM HE STAKED HIS LIFE AND MET A HEROES DEATH. WITH HIM HAS PASSED AWAY ONE OF THE GREATEST HEROES OF GERMAN HISTORY. IN PROUD REVERENCE AND GRIEF WE LOWER OUR FLAGS TO HALF MAST. THE FUEHRER HAS DESIGNATED ME AS HIS SUCCESSOR AND CHIEF OF STATE AND SUPREME COMMANDER OF THE ARMED FORCES. I ASSUME SUPREME COMMAND OVER THE STRUGGLE AGAINST BOLSHEVISM UNTIL THE FIGHTING TROOPS AND THE HUNDREDS OF THOUSANDS OF FAMILIES IN EASTERN GERMANY HAVE BEEN SAVED FROM ENSLAVEMENT OR ANNIHILATION.

AGAINST THE ENGLISH AND AMERICANS I MUST CONTINUE THE FIGHT IN SO FAR AS AND S0 LONG AS THEY HINDER ME IN THE PROSECUTION OF THE BATTLE AGAINST BOLSHEVISM. THE SITUATION REQUIRES A FURTHER UNCONDITIONAL PLEDGE OF YOU, WHO HAVE ALREADY ACCOMPLISHED SUCH GREAT HISTORICAL DEEDS AND WHO NOW YEARN FOR THE END OF THE WAR. I DEMAND DISCIPLINE AND OBEDIENCE. ONLY BY UNQUALIFIED EXECUTION OF MY COMMANDS CAN CHAOS AND DEFEAT BE AVOIDED.

COWARD AND TRAITOR IS HE WHO AT THIS MOMENT EVADES HIS DUTY AND THEREBY ABANDONS GERMAN WOMEN AND CHILDREN TO DEATH AND SLAVERY (several lines are unreadable). GERMAN SOLDIERS, DO YOUR DUTY. THE LIFE OF THE PEOPLE IS AT STAKE.

DOENITZ
