= Bill Coverdale =

English cricketer

Personal information
- Full name: Walter William Coverdale
- Nationality: English
- Born: 30 May 1912; Romford
- Died: 6 October 1972; Harlow Green, Gateshead
- Years active: 1931 - 1932

Sport
- Sport: Cricket
- Position: Batsman
- Team: Northamptonshire

Walter William Coverdale (30 May 1912 - 6 October 1972) was an English cricketer active from 1931 to 1932 who played for Northamptonshire (Northants). He appeared in 31 first-class matches as a righthanded batsman who bowled right arm medium pace. Coverdale was born in Romford on 30 May 1912 and died in Harlow Green, Gateshead on 6 October 1972. He scored 512 runs with a highest score of 35 not out and took one wicket with a best performance of one for 25.
