= Hinsdale Township High School =

Hinsdale Township High School may refer to:

- Hinsdale Township High School Central, in Illinois
- Hinsdale Township High School South, in Illinois
