= Anglophone East School District =

School district in New Brunswick, Canada

Address
- 100 Westmorland St. Moncton, New Brunswick Canada

District information
- Superintendent: Randolph MacLean
- Chair of the board: Dominic Vautour
- Schools: 39
- Budget: CA$170 (2020–2021) million

Students and staff
- Students: 19,228

Other information
- Website: asdeast.nbed.ca

Anglophone East School District is a Canadian school district in South-East New Brunswick. The district is an Anglophone district operating 39 public schools from grades Kindergarten to 12 in Albert and Westmorland counties. Notably, Havelock School is on the border of Kings County and Westmorland County.

The name of the school district was changed from School District 2 to Anglophone East School District in July 2012.

Enrollment for 2023-2024 is at approximately 19,228 students. Anglophone East School District is headquartered in Moncton.

== List of schools ==
School name	Municipality	Grade	County	Student Pop
Arnold H. McLeod School	Moncton	K-5	Westmorland	397
Beaverbrook School	Moncton	K-8	Westmorland	278
Bernice MacNaughton High School	Moncton	9-12	Westmorland	951
Bessborough School	Moncton	K-8	Westmorland	579
Birchmount School	Moncton	K-8	Westmorland	583
Caledonia Regional High School	Hillsborough	6-12	Albert	276
Claude D. Taylor School	Riverview	K-5	Albert	223
Dorchester Consolidated School	Dorchester	K-8	Westmorland	106
Edith Cavell School	Moncton	K-8	Westmorland	409
Evergreen Park School	Moncton	K-5	Westmorland	660
Forest Glen School	Moncton	K-4	Westmorland	366
Frank L. Bowser School	Riverview	K-5	Albert	351
Harrison Trimble High School	Moncton	9-12	Westmorland	1450
Havelock School	Havelock	K-5	Kings	83
Hillcrest School	Moncton	K-8	Westmorland	126
Hillsborough Elementary School	Hillsborough	K-5	Albert	128
Lewisville Middle School	Moncton	6-8	Westmorland	561
Lou MacNarin School	Dieppe	K-5	Westmorland	768
Magnetic Hill School	Lutes Mountain	K-8	Westmorland	442
Maplehurst Middle School	Moncton	5-8	Westmorland	716
Marshview Middle School	Sackville	5-8	Westmorland	323
Moncton High School	Moncton	9-12	Westmorland	1572
Mountain View School	Irishtown	K-5	Westmorland	122
Northrop Frye School	Moncton	K-5	Westmorland	869
Petitcodiac Regional School	Petitcodiac	K-12	Westmorland	717
Port Elgin Regional School	Port Elgin	K-8	Westmorland	184
Queen Elizabeth School	Moncton	K-8	Westmorland	455
Riverside Consolidated School	Riverside-Albert	K-5	Albert	52
Riverview East School	Riverview	K-5	Albert	500
Riverview High School	Riverview	9-12	Albert	1139
Riverview Middle School	Riverview	6-8	Albert	778
Salem Elementary School	Sackville	K-4	Westmorland	360
Salisbury Elementary School	Salisbury	K-4	Westmorland	331
Salisbury Regional School	Salisbury	5-12	Westmorland	613
Shediac Cape School	Shediac Cape	K-8	Westmorland	514
Sunny Brae Middle School	Moncton	5-8	Westmorland	355
Tantramar Regional High School	Sackville	9-12	Westmorland	498
Wabanaki School	Moncton	6-8	Westmorland	759
West Riverview School	Riverview	K-5	Albert	319

== See also ==
- List of school districts in New Brunswick
- List of schools in New Brunswick
