= Salisbury Regional School =

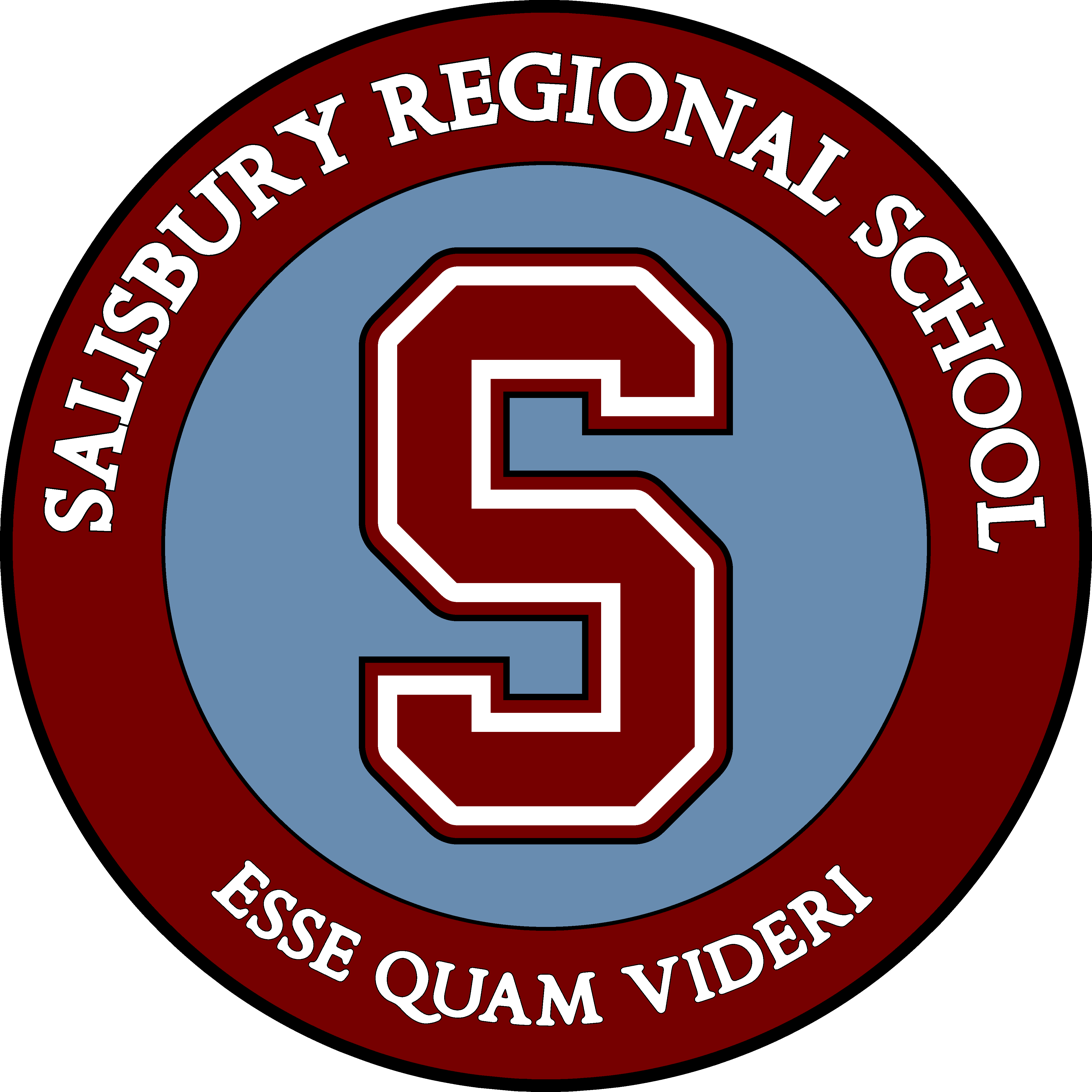

Location
- Salisbury, New Brunswick, E4J 2B4; Canada; 46.024892°N 65.040686°W

Information
- Type: Public
- Motto: "Esse quam videri" (To Be, Rather Than To Seem)
- Established: 1981
- School district: Anglophone East School District
- Principal: Tammy Constantine
- Teaching staff: 41.6
- Colours: Maroon, Baby Blue
- Mascot: Cougar
- Website: srs.nbed.ca

Salisbury Regional School is a public school located in Salisbury, New Brunswick, Canada. Formerly named JMA Armstrong High School/Salisbury Middle School — The name was changed in 2022 to just Salisbury Regional School after motion passed from AESD District Education Council. Established in 1981, the school is part of the Anglophone East School District, serving students from grades 5-12.

== Notable alumni ==
- Stacy Wilson - is a former captain of the Canadian national women's hockey team, head coach of the Bowdoin College women's ice hockey team.
