= Stephen Coverdale =

English cricketer and administrator

Stephen Peter Coverdale (born 20 November 1954) is an English retired first-class cricketer who played for Cambridge University from 1974 to 1977, for Yorkshire from 1973 to 1980, and then for Northamptonshire in 1987.

Coverdale was born in York, Yorkshire, England, and educated at St Peter's School, York, and Emmanuel College, Cambridge. A wicket-keeper-batsman, he won four blues at Cambridge, and made 46 first-class appearances, scoring 1,245 runs at 18.04, with a top score of 75. He took 41 catches and 10 stumpings, and took a wicket in his only first-class over, which was also a maiden.

He had a distinguished career in cricket administration, before joining a hospitality firm, European Events, in 2005. A qualified solicitor, Coverdale joined the BBC as a broadcaster and Head of department, before being appointed as chief executive of Northamptonshire County Cricket Club in 1985, a post he held for a record nineteen years.

His broadcasting career included a spell during the early 80s as anchorman for the BBC Radio Leeds Saturday sports programme during the winter months.

He is the father of Paul Coverdale, a cricketing all-rounder who was, until 2007, on Northamptonshire's staff.
