= Drew Coverdale =

English footballer (born 1969)

Personal information
- Date of birth: 20 September 1969 (age 57)
- Place of birth: Norton, County Durham, England
- Height: 5 ft 11 in (1.80 m)
- Position: Full back

Senior career*
Years	Team	Apps	(Gls)
–	Middlesbrough	0	(0)
1989–1992	Darlington	49	(4)
1992–1993	Boston United	13	(1)
1995–2001	Billingham Synthonia	127	(8)
- * Club domestic league appearances and goals

Drew Coverdale (born 20 September 1969) is an English former footballer who made 30 appearances in the Football League playing as a full back for Darlington in the 1990s. He began his career with Middlesbrough, without representing them in the League, and went on to play non-league football for clubs including Boston United and Billingham Synthonia. He was a member of the Darlington team that won the 1989–90 Football Conference title and consequent promotion to the Football League Fourth Division.

At the age of 24, Coverdale gave up full-time football to qualify as a physiotherapist. He went on to work in the NHS and in private practice.

== Honours ==
Darlington

- Football League Fourth Division: 1990–91
