= John Coverdale =

New Zealand academic psychiatrist

- Education: University of Otago
- Awards: AOA Robert J. Glaser Award, Vestermark Award
- Scientific career
- Fields: Psychiatry
- Workplaces: Baylor College of Medicine
- Thesis: Family planning, sexually transmitted infections, and ethical challenges in managing decisions about contraception and pregnancy when patients have a major mental disorder (2004)

John H. Coverdale is a New Zealand-born academic psychiatrist, educator and editor. He is currently a full professor of psychiatry, behavioral sciences, and medical ethics at Baylor College of Medicine.

== Academic career ==
After promotion to associate professor at the University of Auckland, Coverdale moved to Baylor College of Medicine in 2000, rising to full professor. He completed an MD from the University of Otago in 2004, with a thesis entitled 'Family planning, sexually transmitted infections, and ethical challenges in managing decisions about contraception and pregnancy when patients have a major mental disorder.'

He has expertise in human trafficking, and he founded and co-directs the Baylor Anti-Human Trafficking Program. He is an educator and a senior editor of the journals Academic Medicine and Academic Psychiatry.

== Selected works ==
- Coverdale, John, Sarah Turbott, Helen Roberts. "Family planning needs and STD risk behaviors of female psychiatric outpatients." British Journal of Psychiatry 171 (1997): 69–72.
- Coverdale, John. "Virtues-based advice for beginning medical students." Obstetrics and Gynecology 111, no. 2 (2008): 427–430.
- Coverdale, John, Laurence McCullough, Frank Chervenak. "The ethics of randomized placebo-controlled trials of antidepressants with pregnant women." Obstetrics and Gynecology 112, no. 6 (2008): 1361–1368.
- Coverdale, John, Richard Balon, Laura Roberts. "Teaching sexual history-taking: a systematic review of education programs." Academic Medicine 86, no. 12 (2011): 1590–1595.
- Coverdale, John, Sara Coverdale, Ray Nairn. “Behind the mugshot grin: uses of madness-talk in reports of Loughner’s mass killing." Journal of Communication Inquiry 37, no. 3 (2013): 200–216.
- Coverdale, John, Richard Balon, Eugene Beresin, Adam Brenner, Antonio Guerrero, Alan Louie, Laura Roberts. "Climate change: a call to action for the psychiatric profession." Academic Psychiatry 42, no. 3 (2018): 317–323.
- McCullough, Laurence, John Coverdale, Frank Chervenak. Professional Ethics in Obstetrics and Gynecology, Cambridge University Press, 2020, ISBN 9781316631492.
- Coverdale, John, Mollie Gordon, Phuong Nguyen (editors). Human Trafficking: A Treatment Guide for Mental Health Professionals. American Psychiatric Association Press, 2020, ISBN 978-1-61537-248-5.
