= Lutes Mountain, New Brunswick =

Community in New Brunswick, Canada

Coordinates: 46.1393°N 64.9096°W

Lutes Mountain is a Canadian community, located in Westmorland County, New Brunswick. The community is situated in southeastern New Brunswick, to the northwest of Moncton. Lutes Mountain is located around the intersection of New Brunswick Route 126 and New Brunswick Route 128.

== History ==
The community was settled around 1811 by members of the German Lutes family from Pennsylvania. The community had a post office between 1859 and 1936. Lutes Mountain had a population of approximately 65 families in 1866. In 1871 it had a population of 300, and in 1898 it had a population of 500. Former parts of Lutes Mountain have been incorporated into the city of Moncton.

== Places of note ==
- Magnetic Hill School

== See also ==
- List of communities in New Brunswick
- Greater Moncton
- List of entertainment events in Greater Moncton
