= Bernice MacNaughton High School =

Public secondary school in Moncton, New Brunswick, Canada

Location
- 999 St. George Blvd. Moncton, New Brunswick, E1E 2C9; Canada; 46.086455°N 64.82923964°W

Information
- School type: Public, coeducational high school
- Motto: "Qui valet sustinet" (Strength to Endure)
- Founded: 1975
- School board: Anglophone East School District
- Superintendent: Randolph MacLean
- Principal: David MacDonald
- Vice principals: Amy Burke & Susan Lockwood
- Staff: 78
- Grades: 9–12
- Language: English, French Second-Language
- Area: Moncton Crescent and Moncton West
- Colours: Green and white
- Song: "BMHS Fight Song"
- Mascot: Highlander
- Team name: The Highlanders
- Newspaper: The Highlander
- Yearbook: ceilidh
- Feeder schools: Bessborough, Evergreen Park, Hillcrest, Maplehurst, Wabanaki
- CEEB code: 823305
- Website: bmhs.nbed.ca

Bernice MacNaughton High School (Bernice MacNaughton, MacNaughton, or BMHS) is a high school in Moncton, New Brunswick, Canada.

== Name ==
Bernice MacNaughton High School was named after Dr. L. Bernice MacNaughton, a Moncton teacher, and was formerly known as Dr. L. Bernice MacNaughton High School.

== History ==
Founded in 1975 as a trade school, Bernice MacNaughton originally accommodated 1,400 students. It became the MacNaughton Science & Technology Center (MSTC) in 1994 but was reestablished as a high school in 1999, consisting only of grade nine students. 2003 saw the first graduating class of BMHS. MacNaughton underwent an extensive multi-million dollar renovation between 2000 and 2003; additions included construction of a new gymnasium and several classrooms, landscaping, additional lighting, and driveway resurfacing. The auditorium was renovated in 2006. By 2008, a new roof for the school's cafeteria had been completed.

In November 2012, the City of Moncton announced that it would contribute $750,000 toward a new artificial turf sports field on MacNaughton's grounds. The Province of New Brunswick later announced that it would invest a further $400,000 toward the sports field, which was used as a training ground for the 2014 FIFA Under-20 Women's World Cup.

== Facilities ==
MacNaughton is located in Moncton's West end and is within walking distance of the city's walking trails and Centennial Park. Its campus offers access to cross-country ski trails and two sports fields. The school features a large, central cafeteria and foyer, and the auditorium can support fully orchestrated theatrical and musical productions. BMHS also has several science laboratories, special woodworking and metalworking shops, two art rooms, a darkroom, several computer labs, and two music rooms.

== Academic life ==
=== Courses ===
Bernice MacNaughton High School runs on a two-semester arrangement. Most courses run on a full-semester basis, but some grade nine specialty courses (e.g. physical education, visual arts) are half-semester courses. MacNaughton offers students a wide variety of courses, from aviation technology to Mandarin, as well as three Advanced Placement courses: Chemistry, English Literature and Composition, and Psychology. Classes commence at 09:30 (AST) and end at 4:00 AST. Students take five sixty-minute courses every day, with an hour-long break between the third and fourth classes and seven- or eight-minute breaks between all other classes.

In 2008, BMHS implemented a thirty-minute directed learning period, known colloquially as "Period 6", in order to allow fellow Clan members to jointly study, work on homework, or seek extra help. During the 2009–2010 school year, the directed learning period was moved to 10:54 AST, between the second and third period. In the 2012–2013 school year, the directed learning period was rotated throughout the day as a function of the day of the week. The directed learning period was removed in the 2013–2014 school year, but was later brought back for the 2023-2024 school year.

=== House system ===
Upon arrival at MacNaughton, students are automatically and randomly sorted into one of four houses called "Clans", in reference to the Highland Scottish clans Campbell, MacDonald, MacLeod, and Stewart.

== Extracurricular activities ==
BMHS offers a wide array of extracurricular activities:

=== Athletics ===
MacNaughton offers a wide selection of sports clubs and organized teams at the junior varsity and senior varsity, male and female, levels. These vary from year to year and include:

- Badminton
- Baseball
- Basketball
- Cross country
- Curling
- Field hockey
- Football
- Golf
- Rugby union
- Soccer
- Track and field
- Volleyball
- Wrestling

Bernice MacNaughton compete in the New Brunswick Interscholastic Athletic Association.

=== School newspaper ===
The school newspaper has undergone frequent name changes. The latest edition, entitled The Highlander, was published in 2014.

=== Yearbook ===
The annual BMHS yearbook is entitled ceilidh.

== Theatrical productions ==
=== Musical productions ===
Bernice MacNaughton has performed seventeen musicals and one collection of Broadway show tunes:

- Oliver! (2003)
- Nunsense (2003)
- The Sound of Music (2004)
- Nunsense 2: The Second Coming (2005)
- Broadway Meets the Bard, a collection of Broadway songs and Shakespeare excerpts (December 2005)
- Grease (2006)
- West Side Story (April 18–21, 2007)
- Crazy for You (April 23–26, 2008)
- Bye Bye Birdie (April 22–25, 2009)
- White Christmas (December 9–12, 2009)
- The Phantom of the Opera (April 6–8, 2011)
- The Drowsy Chaperone (December 7–10, 2011)
- Grease (2013)
- Sympathy Jones (November 20–23, 2013)
- Carrie: The Musical (November 26–29, 2014)
- Shrek The Musical (2015)
- Mamma Mia! (2018)
- High School Musical on Stage! (February 14–17, 2024)
- Rodgers and Hammerstein's Cinderella (2025)
- SpongeBob Squarepants: the Musical (2026)

=== Dramatic productions ===
Bernice MacNaughton has presented several dramatic productions:

- Lord of the Flies (2001)
- Our Town (November 28–December 1, 2007)
- Scenes from an Italian Restaurant, an original composition consisting of a series of ten-minute plays (November 2008)
- Scenes in the Key of Life, an original composition consisting of a series of ten-minute plays and musical performances (2010)
- Ralph's Basement, an original composition (June 3–5, 2010)
- Alien Grunge Love (2014)
- I'm Sorry, We Tried, an original collection of micro-dramas (May 14–16, 2019)
- I'm Not Mad, I'm Just Disappointed (2022)
- Merry Friggin' Christmas (2022)
- Madame Butter, directed by Madeleine Strandberg (December 2023)
- More! More! More! (2023)
- Dungeons and Dance Battles (2024)
- Popcorn Lung and Other Modern Problems (2024)
- Christmas Collection (2024)
- Ratz! (2025)
- Moments of Myth and Mayhem (2025)

== Notable alumni ==
- Danielle Dorris - Canadian Olympian, won gold at the 2020 and 2024 Paralympics
- Courtney Sarault - Canadian short track speed skater, won many world medals

== See also ==
- Anglophone East School District
