= Tantramar Regional High School =

Tantramar Regional High School Home of the Titans

Location
- 223 Main Street; Sackville, New Brunswick, E4L 3A7; Canada
- 45.91021°N 64.36919°W

Information
- School type: Public High school
- Founded: 1971
- School board: Anglophone East School District
- Superintendent: Randolph MacLean
- School number: 1411
- Principal: Susan Lafford
- Vice principals: Joceline Young & Karlene Milson
- Grades: 9, 10, 11, 12
- Enrollment: 452 (2015)
- Language: English
- Colours: Red and Blue
- Mascot: Titan
- Team name: Titans
- Website: trhs.nbed.nb.ca

Tantramar Regional High School, is a Canadian secondary school located in Sackville, New Brunswick.

Tantramar Regional High School is home to the Tantramar Wetlands Centre, a program that aims to provide outdoor education for students. The Tantramar Wetlands Centre was founded in 1998, by Ducks Unlimited Canada, the Canadian Wildlife Service, New Brunswick's Department of Natural Resources, the Town of Sackville and the School District, who teamed up to create the wetlands. The Wetlands Centre for 25 years has been maintained and researched by a group of students looking to better their wetlands education as well as teach visiting schools and students about the ecosystem. The center offers a hands-on education program to their students, teachers, and for the general public.

== Notable alumni ==
- Ian Hanomansing - journalist
- Marc Milner - historian
