= Riverview High School (New Brunswick) =

Riverview High School (RHS)
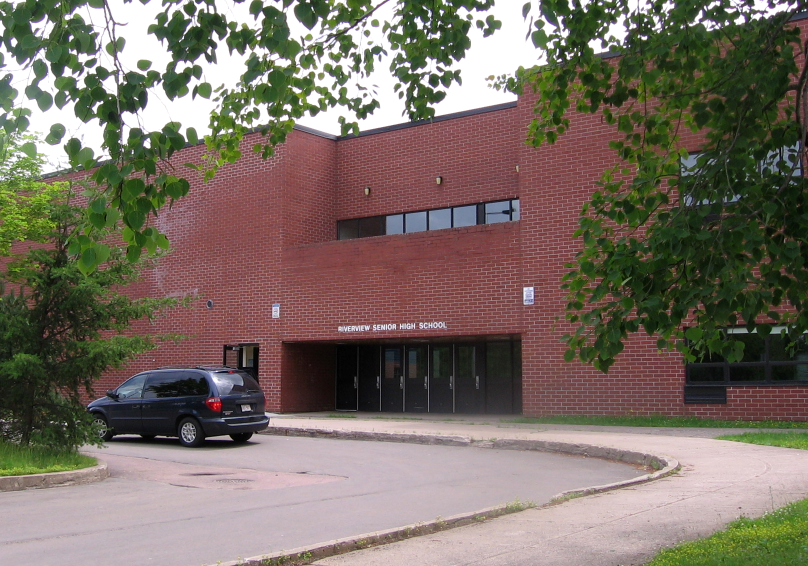

Location
- 400 Whitepine Road; Riverview, New Brunswick, E1B 4H8; Canada; 46.0567°N 64.8016°W

Information
- School type: Public high school
- Motto: Stamus Pro Veritate (We Stand for Truth)
- Founded: 1978
- School board: Anglophone East School District
- Superintendent: Randolph MacLean
- School number: 1570
- Principal: Heather McIntyre
- Vice principals: Helene Chiasson, Greg Longaphie, and Katherine Colpitts Beers
- Staff: 90+
- Grades: 9-12
- Enrollment: 1096
- Language: English, French immersion
- Area: Riverview, New Brunswick
- Colour
- Mascot: Lion
- Team name: Royals
- Website: rhsroyals.nbed.nb.ca

Riverview High School, or simply known as RHS, is a public high school in Riverview, New Brunswick, Canada. It is part of the province's Anglophone East School District, offering education to students from grade nine to twelve. It is the only high school in Riverview, and one of four Anglophone high schools in Greater Moncton.

== History ==
The school was founded in September 1978 starting with two Grade 10 classes. Prior to that date Grades 10 through 12 from the then community of Riverview Heights attended Moncton High School. From its beginnings until 1978, the high school was located at 45 Devere Road, now the site of Riverview Middle School.

In 1978 a new facility was opened on an 18-hectare site about two kilometres west of the old school (which became Riverview Middle School). The new school also has a swimming pool, a feature the old school did not possess. In 2006 the auditorium began to operate independently for community use and plays host to many different shows each year, including a Stereos/The Midway State concert in November 2009. The school uses the auditorium for its annual theatre productions.

== The building ==
The school has a theatre (The Riverview Arts Centre), a gymnasium, music rooms, a cafeteria, a library, a student learning center (called SLC), a swimming pool, a courtyard, two art rooms, three computer labs, a woodshop, automotive lab, a culinary tech room/kitchen, and three science labs.

== School culture ==
The school has its own song. The school's colours are red and white; the mascot is a lion.

== Notable alumni ==
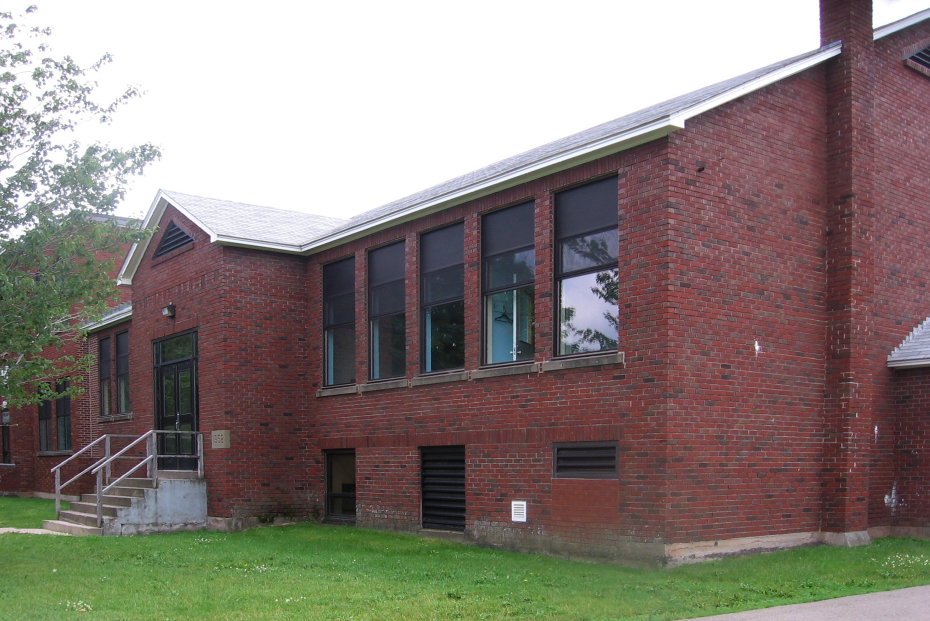
View of the original school, built in 1962. This building now forms a wing of Riverview Middle School on Devere Road, Riverview, New Brunswick.

- Michael de Adder, Canadian editorial cartoonist and caricaturist working at The Washington Post
- Travis Jayner, member of the United States short track speed skating team and winner of a bronze medal in the 5000m relay in the 2010 Winter Olympics in Vancouver, British Columbia, Canada
- Michael LeBlanc, represented Canada in the 60m at the 2012 IAAF World Indoor Championships in Istanbul, Turkey
- Gabriel Wortman, perpetrator of the 2020 Nova Scotia attacks

== See also ==
- List of schools in New Brunswick
