= Riverview, New Brunswick =

Riverview
- Town
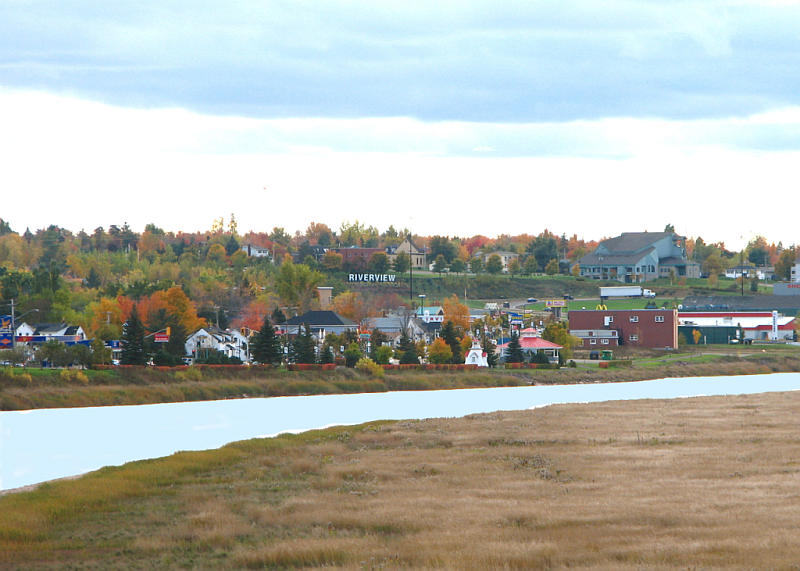

- Motto: A Great Place To Grow
- Location of Riverview in New Brunswick
- Coordinates: 46.06125°N 64.80517°W
- Country: Canada
- Province: New Brunswick
- County: Albert County
- Parish: Coverdale Parish
- Founded: 1733
- Incorporated: July 9, 1973

Government
  - MPs: Rob Moore (CPC)
  - Mayor: Andrew J. LeBlanc
  - Governing Body: Riverview Town Council
  - MLAs: Rob Weir (PC); Sherry Wilson (PC)

Area
  - Total: 34.10 km^{2} (13.17 sq mi)
- Elevation: 0–30 m (0–98 ft)

Population (2021)
  - Total: 20,584
  - Density: 603.7/km^{2} (1,564/sq mi)
- Time zone: Atlantic Standard Time (-4)
- Postal code: E1B
- Area code: 506
- Telephone Exchange: 386
- NTS Map: 21I2 Moncton
- GNBC Code: DBBTG
- Highway: Route 112; Route 114
- Waterways: Petitcodiac River, Mill Creek, Turtle Creek
- Website: townofriverview.ca

Riverview is a town in Albert County, New Brunswick, Canada. Riverview is located on the south side of the Petitcodiac River, across from the larger cities of Moncton and Dieppe. Riverview has an area of 34 square kilometres (13 sq mi), and a population density of 564.6 inhabitants per square kilometre (1,462/sq mi). Riverview's slogan is "A Great Place To Grow". With a population of 20,584 in 2021,

Riverview is the largest town in New Brunswick, and despite being designated as a town it is the fifth-largest municipality in the province, being more populous than the cities of Edmundston, Bathurst, Campbellton, and Miramichi.

== History ==
Though the Petitcodiac River was a regular transportation corridor for aboriginal peoples, the first known settlements in the area were three Acadian villages in what are now Turtle Creek, Lower Coverdale and Point Park. The French-speaking families were forced to abandon the area in 1758 during the Grand Derangement. Resettlement of what would become Riverview began around 1783 when settlers from Yorkshire, England began to farm there. The Town of Riverview was formed on July 9, 1973 with the amalgamation of the three villages of Bridgedale, Gunningsville and Riverview Heights. Harold Findlay became the first mayor and seven councillors were elected at-large to serve a population of 14,177. Since that time, Riverview has grown to include almost 19,130 represented by four ward councillors and three councillors-at-large.

Riverview's first female mayor was Anne Seamans who served until her retirement in 2021.

== Demographics ==
In the 2021 Census of Population conducted by Statistics Canada, Riverview had a population of 20,584 living in 8,651 of its 8,797 total private dwellings, a change of 4.7% from its 2016 population of 19,667. With a land area of 34.1 km^{2} (13.2 sq mi), it had a population density of 603.6/km^{2} (1,563.4/sq mi) in 2021.

Riverview's linguistic majority is English, with 90.6% speaking English as a first language and only 7.8% speaking French as a first language. The adjacent cities of Moncton and Dieppe are about 32% and 73% Francophone respectively and have benefited from an ongoing rural depopulation of the Acadian Peninsula and areas in northern and eastern New Brunswick. About 27% of the town population is bilingual and understands both English and French.

Historical population
Year	Pop.	±%
1981	14,907	—
1986	15,638	+4.9%
1991	16,270	+4.0%
1996	16,653	+2.4%
2001	17,010	+2.1%
2006	17,832	+4.8%
2011	19,128	+7.3%
2016	19,667	+2.8%
2021	20,584	+4.7%

Panethnic groups in the Town of Riverview (2001−2021)
Panethnic group	2021		2016		2011		2006		2001	
Panethnic group	Pop.	%	Pop.	%	Pop.	%	Pop.	%	Pop.	%
European (Note: Statistic includes all persons that did not make up part of a visible minority or an indigenous identity.)	18,590	91.58%	18,535	95.05%	18,195	96.02%	17,285	98.18%	16,595	98.75%
Indigenous	395	1.95%	385	1.97%	275	1.45%	110	0.62%	55	0.33%
South Asian	375	1.85%	30	0.15%	30	0.16%	35	0.2%	15	0.09%
African	315	1.55%	185	0.95%	90	0.47%	100	0.57%	85	0.51%
Southeast Asian (Note: Statistic includes total responses of "Filipino" and "Southeast Asian" under visible minority section on census.)	260	1.28%	120	0.62%	170	0.9%	30	0.17%	0	0%
East Asian (Note: Statistic includes total responses of "Chinese", "Korean", and "Japanese" under visible minority section on census.)	165	0.81%	190	0.97%	170	0.9%	50	0.28%	20	0.12%
Middle Eastern (Note: Statistic includes total responses of "West Asian" and "Arab" under visible minority section on census.)	70	0.34%	35	0.18%	0	0%	0	0%	0	0%
Latin American	65	0.32%	20	0.1%	0	0%	0	0%	0	0%
Other/multiracial (Note: Statistic includes total responses of "Visible minority, n.i.e." and "Multiple visible minorities" under visible minority section on census.)	65	0.32%	20	0.1%	0	0%	0	0%	45	0.27%
Total responses	20,300	98.62%	19,500	99.15%	18,950	99.07%	17,605	98.73%	16,805	98.79%
Total population	20,584	100%	19,667	100%	19,128	100%	17,832	100%	17,010	100%
Note: Totals greater than 100% due to multiple origin responses

== Neighbourhoods ==
Riverview has seven main neighbourhoods, each with several smaller subdivisions:

- West Riverview
- Riverview Heights
- Findlay South
- Gunningsville
- Point Park
- Bridgedale
- Cross Creek

== Emergency services ==
The town is served by Ambulance New Brunswick, Riverview Fire & Rescue, and the Royal Canadian Mounted Police. Hospital services are located in Moncton, New Brunswick.

== Sports ==
=== Facilities ===
See Moncton Sport Facilities

- Riverview Aquatic Centre - a full size indoor swimming pool with 6 lanes (each 25m long) connected with Riverview High School.
- Several soccer and baseball fields
- Byron Dobson Memorial Arena, with two hockey rinks
- Six green clay tennis courts

== Events ==
Riverview Sunfest is an annual festival of events to celebrate the incorporation of Riverview as a town and Canada Day.

== Urban parks ==
- Caseley Park - A large park in front of town hall named after former mayor of Riverview, Ralph Caseley. The park includes a monument of a Centurion Tank and a monument to the victims of the Polytechnique massacre.
- Riverfront Park - A park by the Petitcodiac River Causeway featuring an outdoor workout centre often referred to as the "Green Gym".
- Mill Creek Nature Park - a 133 ha nature park with a network of formal and informal trails.
- Bridgedale Centre Play Area
- Dobson Trail
- Gunningsville Boulevard
- Hawthorne Play Area
- Riverview Lions Community Park

== Places of interest ==
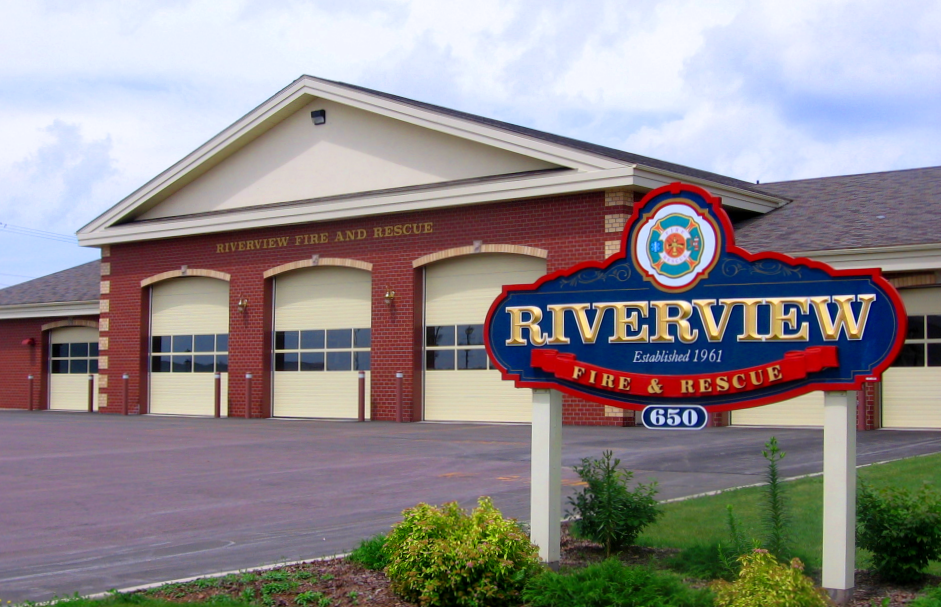
Riverview Fire Station

The town is home to one of seven Nav Canada area control centres, Moncton Area Control Centre, serving air traffic over New Brunswick, Prince Edward Island, Nova Scotia and eastern Quebec. The centre controls all air traffic between Europe and Eastern Canada. This centre monitors over 430,000 flights a year, 80% of which are either entering or leaving North American airspace.

== Media ==
See Media in Greater Moncton

== Transportation ==
See Greater Moncton Transportation

== Education ==
There are currently seven schools in Riverview, including one high school, one middle school, and four elementary schools, the newest of which is Riverview East School which officially opened in 2014.

- Riverview High School (9-12)
- Riverview Middle School (6-8)
- Riverview East School (K-8)
- West Riverview School|West Riverview Elementary School (K-5)
- Frank L. Bowser Elementary School (K-5)
- Claude D. Taylor Elementary School (K-5)

== Climate ==
Climate data for Riverview
Month	Jan	Feb	Mar	Apr	May	Jun	Jul	Aug	Sep	Oct	Nov	Dec	Year
Record high humidex	18.2	15.8	17.5	25.8	37.6	40.6	43.5	44.5	38.9	31.2	28.2	20.3	44.5
Record high °C (°F)	16.1 (61.0)	15.3 (59.5)	29 (84)	28.3 (82.9)	34.2 (93.6)	34.4 (93.9)	35.6 (96.1)	37.2 (99.0)	33.3 (91.9)	26.1 (79.0)	22.9 (73.2)	17.8 (64.0)	37.2 (99.0)
Mean daily maximum °C (°F)	−3.6 (25.5)	−2.7 (27.1)	2.0 (35.6)	8.0 (46.4)	15.9 (60.6)	21.3 (70.3)	24.5 (76.1)	23.8 (74.8)	18.8 (65.8)	12.4 (54.3)	5.6 (42.1)	−0.7 (30.7)	10.4 (50.7)
Daily mean °C (°F)	−8.9 (16.0)	−8 (18)	−2.9 (26.8)	3.2 (37.8)	9.9 (49.8)	15.1 (59.2)	18.6 (65.5)	17.9 (64.2)	13.0 (55.4)	7.1 (44.8)	1.4 (34.5)	−5.5 (22.1)	5.1 (41.2)
Mean daily minimum °C (°F)	−14.3 (6.3)	−13.2 (8.2)	−7.8 (18.0)	−1.7 (28.9)	3.9 (39.0)	8.9 (48.0)	12.6 (54.7)	12.0 (53.6)	7.2 (45.0)	1.8 (35.2)	−2.9 (26.8)	−10.3 (13.5)	−0.3 (31.5)
Record low °C (°F)	−32.2 (−26.0)	−31.7 (−25.1)	−27.4 (−17.3)	−16.1 (3.0)	−6.1 (21.0)	−2.1 (28.2)	1.2 (34.2)	0.6 (33.1)	−3.3 (26.1)	−10 (14)	−17.4 (0.7)	−29 (−20)	−32.2 (−26.0)
Record low wind chill	−49.4	−46.0	−39.3	−27.7	−12.6	−5.0	−3.2	−2.5	−9.0	−14.7	−27.1	−43.5	−49.4
Average precipitation mm (inches)	119.2 (4.69)	92.9 (3.66)	123.6 (4.87)	99.3 (3.91)	97.1 (3.82)	91.5 (3.60)	103.3 (4.07)	79.5 (3.13)	92.7 (3.65)	103.8 (4.09)	104.5 (4.11)	115.8 (4.56)	1,223.2 (48.16)
Average rainfall mm (inches)	41.5 (1.63)	26.8 (1.06)	45.9 (1.81)	57.2 (2.25)	91.5 (3.60)	91.5 (3.60)	103.3 (4.07)	79.5 (3.13)	92.7 (3.65)	99.5 (3.92)	81.1 (3.19)	54.9 (2.16)	865.4 (34.07)
Average snowfall cm (inches)	80.1 (31.5)	68.1 (26.8)	70.8 (27.9)	35.8 (14.1)	4.5 (1.8)	0 (0)	0 (0)	0 (0)	0 (0)	3.4 (1.3)	21.7 (8.5)	65.6 (25.8)	349.9 (137.8)
Average precipitation days (≥ 0.2 mm)	16.6	13.8	15.3	15.5	15.1	14.3	13.7	11.8	12.2	13.5	15.6	17.1	174.5
Average rainy days (≥ 0.2 mm)	6.4	4.8	7.7	11.8	14.7	14.3	13.7	11.8	12.2	13.1	12.6	7.9	131.1
Average snowy days (≥ 0.2 cm)	13.5	11.8	11.1	7.3	1.0	0	0	0	0	0.86	5.7	12.6	63.9
Average relative humidity (%)	79.6	79.4	82.2	86.2	87.3	89.9	91.4	93.0	93.3	89.5	86.8	83.5	86.8
Mean monthly sunshine hours	115.1	124.4	139.2	158.2	204.9	228.9	248.4	243.8	167.4	142.3	102.8	95.3	1,970.6
Source: Environment Canada

== See also ==
- Greater Moncton
- Media in Moncton
- List of events in Greater Moncton
- List of communities in New Brunswick
