= New Brunswick Route 1 =

Highway in New Brunswick

Route 1
- Saint John Throughway, Mackay Highway
- Route 1 highlighted in red.
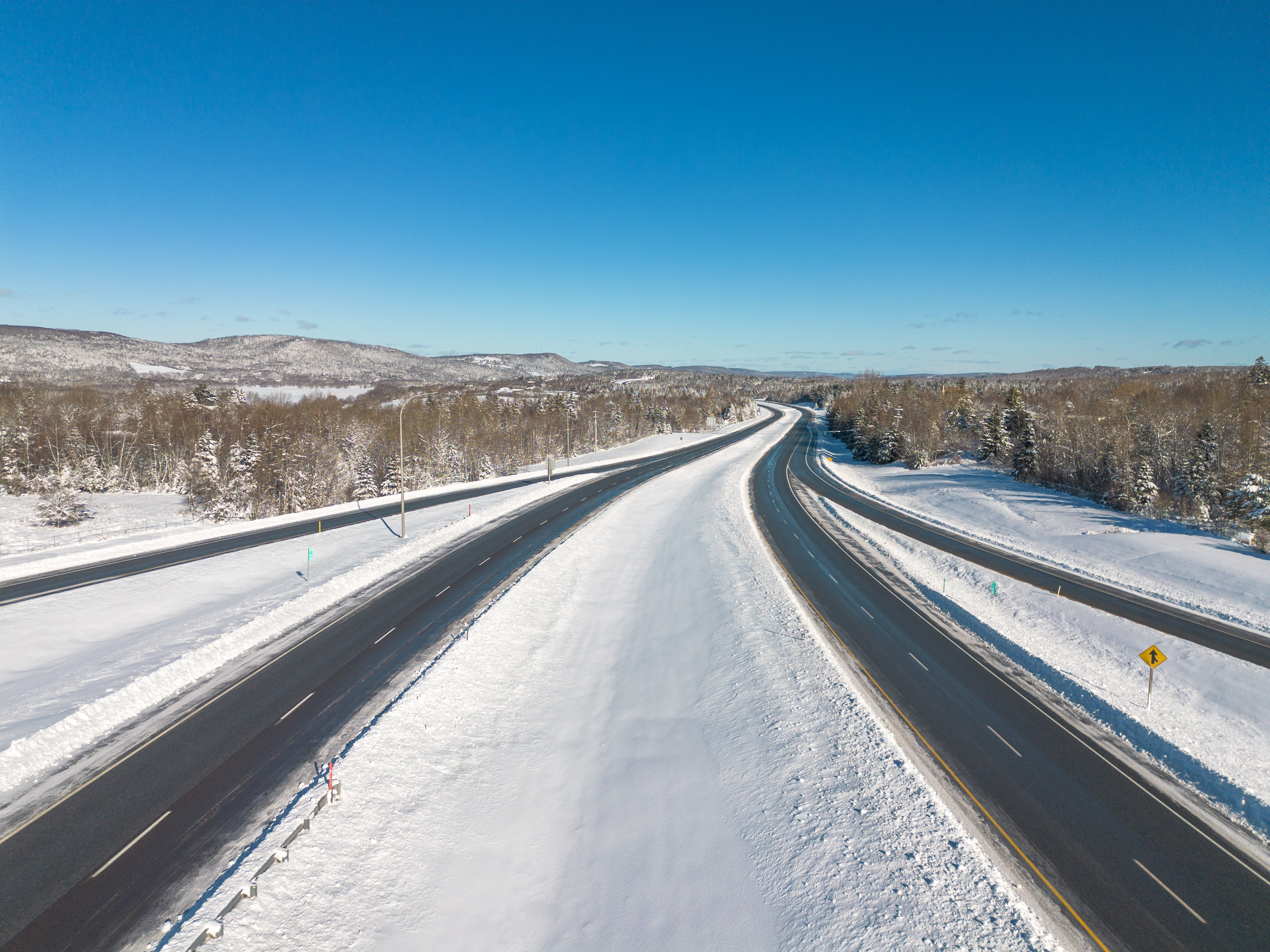
- New Brunswick Route 1 in Hampton

Route information
- Maintained by New Brunswick Department of Transportation
- Length: 239.11 km (148.58 mi)
- Existed: 1927–present

Major junctions
- West end: International Avenue Bridge at the U.S. border near Calais, ME
- Route 3 near St. Stephen; Route 7 near Saint John; Route 10 near Sussex
- East end: Route 2 (TCH) in River Glade

Location
- Country: Canada
- Province: New Brunswick
- Major cities: Oak Bay, Digdeguash, St. George, Pennfield, New River Beach, Pocologan, Lepreau, Musquash, Prince of Wales, Saint John, Rothesay, Quispamsis, Hampton, Valley Waters, St. Stephen, Sussex, Penobsquis, Anagance, Three Rivers

Highway system
- Provincial highways in New Brunswick; Former routes
← Route 970	→ Route 2 (TCH)

Route 1 is a highway in the southern part of the Canadian province of New Brunswick. It begins west of the Canada–United States border at St. Stephen, and runs east for 239.11 kilometres (148.58 mi) to Route 2 at River Glade.

The entire highway is a 4-lane controlled-access freeway. It is one of the most important highways in the province, carrying traffic from the American border in St. Stephen, through the City of Saint John, ending with an interchange with the Trans Canada Highway at River Glade.

== History ==
The majority of road development in New Brunswick follows settlement patterns which pre-dated motor transport, thus most communities developed along navigable waterways or were served by railways. The development of controlled access expressways only began in the 1960s and only around the largest communities. The majority of early provincial highway improvements merely consisted of upgrading local roads.

=== Early route ===
Route 1 initially followed local roads from St. Stephen eastward to Oak Bay where it swung south to the town of St. Andrews, then back north and east (still along local roads) until reaching Saint John where it followed Manawagonish Road through the former city of Lancaster and was later diverted to follow the "Golden Mile" immediately south of Manawagonish Road. It crossed the Saint John River at the Reversing Falls Bridge before proceeding on Douglas Avenue into the north end of the city. From there it went over to Rothesay Avenue and followed the shores of the Kennebecasis River up the valley to Sussex where it ended. Over time, various sections of 2-lane controlled access highway were built to bypass the growing towns and villages, including a long section bypassing the townships of Rothesay and Quispamsis, named the Mackay Highway, having been built through a stretch of timberland formerly owned by the locally prominent Mackay family.

=== Saint John Throughway ===
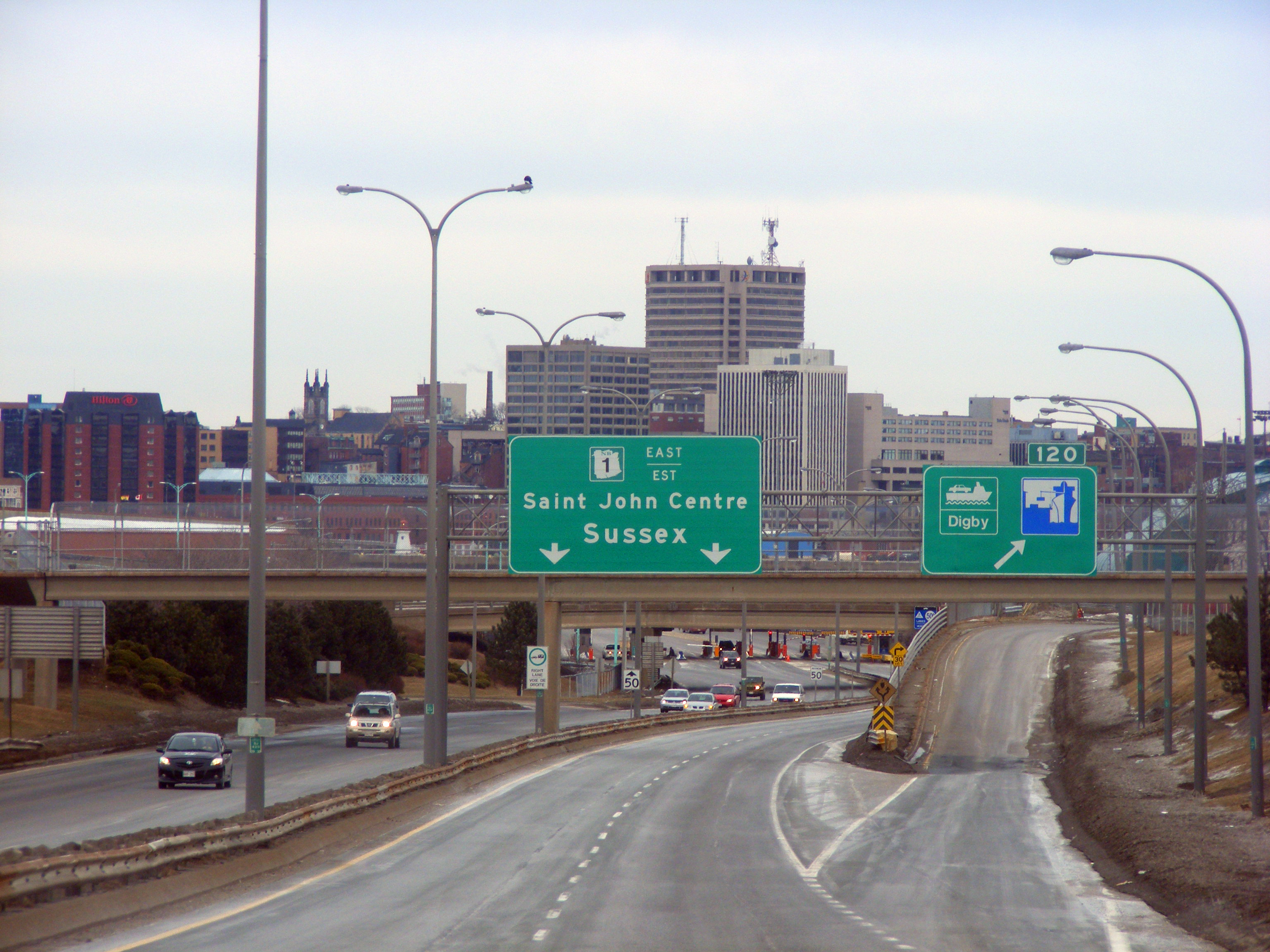
The Saint John Throughway, looking southwest, towards the uptown core

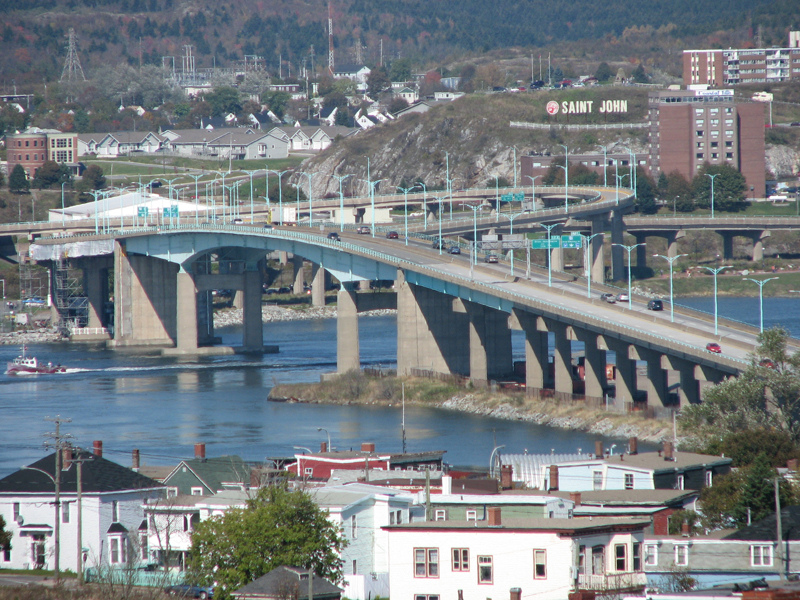
Saint John Harbour Bridge

The earliest significant upgrade to this routing came in the late 1960s during an urban-renewal project in Saint John which saw the construction of a new highway (the Saint John Throughway) to bypass increased truck traffic around the city. Several alignment options were examined with the majority of citizens wanting the highway to go north of the city through the suburb of Millidgeville from where an easier crossing of the Reversing Falls gorge could be attempted.

However, the city, along with the provincial and federal governments, decided to bargain with the Canadian Pacific Railway (CPR) to purchase the majority of the Mill Street Yard near the neo-gothic Union Station for a highway alignment which would run through the middle of the city (somewhat like the infamous Interstate 93 alignment which was built through Boston).

The removal of the rail yard and historic station coincided with the federally-controlled National Harbours Board building the 4-lane Saint John Harbour Bridge downstream of the Reversing Falls which opened in 1968. Part of this deal involved the NHB collecting a 25¢ toll in each direction, however the toll cannot be raised without federal, provincial and municipal agreement, until 2007 when the toll was increased to 50¢. The new bridge also had the added effect of cutting the upper part of Saint John Harbour off from large ship traffic.

In a related project, in 1969, the federal and provincial governments worked with CPR to revamp the Saint John-Digby ferry service by building a new terminal in the city's west end, along with interchanges off the new expressway.

=== Mackay Highway ===
The Saint John Throughway only extended from Spruce Lake at Lorneville in the west, to where it met the end of the Mackay Highway and Rothesay Avenue in the east at Coldbrook but its construction coincided with the decline of rail traffic and rise of truck traffic and personal automobile travel. The Saint John area soon saw the growth of suburbs in the towns of Rothesay and Quispamsis in the Kennebecasis River valley, which were located just outside the Bay of Fundy's "fog belt."

In the 1970s, the Mackay Highway was upgraded from a 2-lane highway to a 4-lane divided highway, and the controlled-access section of the highway was extended further to accommodate the growing town of Quispamsis.

=== Extending controlled access ===
In a new focus on improving arterial highways in the province, the provincial government during the 1960s-1980s undertook other improvements to Route 1, namely in building new sections (or designating existing sections) as controlled access. This resulted in the establishment of maximum speed limits of 100 km/h (62 mph) on these sections.

In the mid-1990s, a 2-lane bypass of Hampton was built up the Kennebecasis Valley from where the Mackay Highway ended, rejoining local roads at Valley Waters. Another bypass was built from Oak Bay to Digdeguash to avoid the circuitous routing down the St. Andrews peninsula and through the town of the same name. Further 2-lane bypasses were built around St. George and on the outskirts of Sussex where an interchange with the Trans-Canada Highway was built.

=== 4-lane construction ===
The provincial government changed in 1987 with the election of Premier Frank McKenna who was focused on improving the province's business climate. One of the government's major tasks was to revamp provincial transportation infrastructure and McKenna entered into aggressive negotiations with the federal government of prime minister Brian Mulroney to secure federal funding of new highway projects. McKenna viewed the Trans-Canada and Route 1 in New Brunswick as being partially a federal responsibility since they funnelled the majority of Atlantic Canada's highway traffic to the U.S. and central Canada. The signing of the Canada-U.S. Free Trade Agreement in 1989, coupled with federal approval for numerous railway line abandonments in the Maritimes during the 1980s, led to predictions of further highway traffic growth on New Brunswick highways in the 1990s.

Under the remainder of the McKenna administration's years of power (until 1997), Route 1 saw 4-lane expansion and upgrading between Lorneville to Lepreau in the west and between Coldbrook and Apohaqui (near Sussex) in the east. A small 4-lane re-alignment was also built between St. George and Pennfield. The Trans-Canada Highway (Route 2) was also upgraded to 4-lanes between Penobsquis and Three Rivers.

Upgrades to Route 1 continued in the late 2000s, with a 4-lane section between St. Stephen and the Route 127 junction at Waweig opening to traffic in December 2008. The St. Stephen Bypass, which had been partially open since 1993 as a 2-lane controlled access route to siphon traffic to the Milltown border crossing, was also upgraded and officially became part of Route 1 at this time. The bypass was completed in November 2009 with the opening of the International Avenue Bridge to Calais, Maine.

It was announced on September 5, 2008 that the remaining stretch of Route 1 that connects to the United States will be twinned. The estimated cost would be $1.2 Billion (including maintenance and not accounting for inflation) with PPP Canada contributing half the cost of construction for an amount estimated to be about $290 million. Work was completed in October 2012. The project was completed in much the same manner as the upgrade and realignment of the Trans-Canada Highway. A private consortium was chosen through a tendering process, and was responsible for the design, and construction for the sections not yet upgraded to 4-lane status. After construction was completed the company formed by the consortium will be responsible for the maintenance of the highway from the US-Canada border crossing, to the interchange with Route 2 at River Glade, 15 km west of Moncton until the year 2040.

On October 25, 2012, the final 8 kilometers of 4-lane highway were opened, completing the project.

=== Trans-Canada re-alignment ===
The final years of the McKenna administration saw an agreement signed with a private consortium called Maritime Road Development Corporation (led by former provincial Liberal leader and former federal Minister of Transport Douglas Young) to privately finance and build a toll highway to carry the Trans-Canada Highway (Route 2) in a new alignment from a point west of Fredericton to a point on the existing TCH west of Moncton at River Glade.

The toll issue was not without controversy as it led to the downfall of McKenna's successor, Camille Theriault in 1999 to PC leader Bernard Lord. The highway was built, but tolls were removed from most portions of the highway before they opened and this portion of the privately built (and owned) re-alignment of the Trans-Canada Highway has a hidden toll which is charged to the provincial government, thus motorists do not directly pay for their highway usage.

The new alignment of the Trans-Canada Highway opened in October, 2001 and at this time the portion of the old TCH which ran between River Glade and Sussex was re-designated as part of Route 1, extending the eastern terminus of this highway approximately 40 km (25 mi). Plans called for completion of a 4-lane bypass to replace the old TCH alignment around Sussex and construction took place from 2000–2004. A portion of the old TCH alignment from Sussex toward Fredericton has been re-designated as Route 10 and a re-aligned interchange has been built at Sussex.

=== Saint John exit upgrades ===
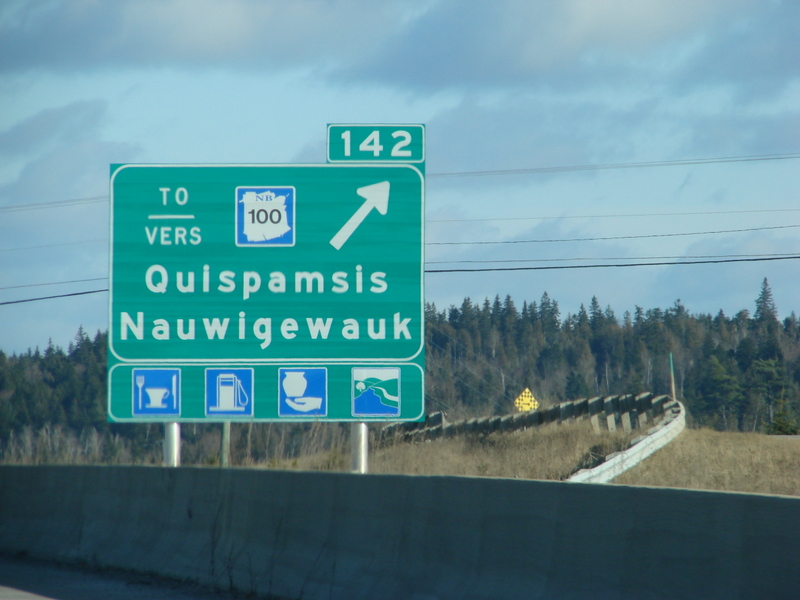
Exit 142 to Route 100, east of Saint John

An experiment with Sunbury's new A-Trains led to the redesign of highway exit 119. Exit 119-B, west-bound, was widened to allow these longer transport truck configurations to navigate the exit. On the opposite side of the highway, the two east-bound on-ramps were combined into a wider single ramp, again to allow easier navigation for the longer transport trucks to navigate.

An east-bound exit was never officially available at exit 128, as it was only a private truck entrance into Strescon's property. In the fall of 2007, this exit was rebuilt into an official exit to allow east-bound traffic access to Rothesay Ave. East-bound traffic can now exit/enter to/from Rothesay Ave (via Ashburn Road) and west-bound traffic can exit/enter to/from Foster Thurston Drive. There is no overpass at this exit.

In December, 2013 the "One Mile House" interchange officially opened after over 4 years of construction with a final price tag of $83 million. This new interchange includes a new 500 m bridge to cross the highway, rail yard, river, and Rothesay Avenue and connects directly to Bayside Drive and Loch Lomond Road, with access to/from Route 100 on Rothesay Avenue. This allows traffic destined for the McAllister and Grandview Industrial Parks and the heavy industrial businesses in that area to get more direct access to Highway 1 and avoid the uptown Saint John streets. The name, "One Mile House", is derived from the section of Saint John located along the railway 1 mile east of the former Union Station.

== Exit list ==
County	Location	km	mi	Exit	Destinations	Notes
St. Croix River		0.0	0.0	United States border International Avenue Bridge – Roadway continues east as International Avenue to US 1 / SR 9		
Charlotte	St. Stephen	3.7	2.3	4	Church Street to Route 725 / Route 170 – St. Stephen, Little Ridge	
Charlotte	St. Stephen	6.5– 7.1	4.0– 4.4	7	Route 740 to Route 735 – Basswood Ridge, Scotch Ridge	Eastbound entrance / westbound exit only
Charlotte	St. Stephen	8.5	5.3	9	Route 3 to Route 170 – St. Stephen, Calais, ME, Fredericton	Signed as exits 9A–B
Charlotte	Oak Bay	13.1	8.1	13	St. David Ridge Road to Route 170 – Oak Bay	
Charlotte	Waweig	22.3	13.9	25	Route 127 – St. Andrews, Lawrence Station	
Charlotte	Digdeguash	35.7	22.2	39	Route 127 west / Basin Road – St. Andrews, Bocabec	Eastern terminus of Route 127
Charlotte	Bethel	41.1	25.5	45	Route 760 – Bethel, Elmsville	
Charlotte	St. George	47.9	29.8	52	Route 760 west / Manor Road Connector Road – St. George	Eastern terminus of Route 760
Charlotte	St. George	52.8	32.8	56	Route 172 south / Route 780 east – St. George, Deer Island, Lake Utopia	Northern terminus of Route 127; western terminus of Route 780
Charlotte	Pennfield Ridge	56.8	35.3	60	Route 176 to Route 175 / Route 778 / Route 785 – Pennfield, Blacks Harbour, Grand Manan	
Charlotte	Pocologan	56.8	35.3	69	Route 175 – Pocologan, New River Beach, Pennfield	
Saint John	Lepreau	82.8	51.4	86	Route 175 west to Route 790 – Lepreau, Maces Bay, Dipper Harbour	Eastern terminus of Route 175
Saint John	Musquash	92.6	57.5	96	Route 790 west / Musquash Road – Musquash, Chance Harbour	Eastern terminus of Route 790
Saint John	Prince of Wales	98.8	61.4	103	Prince of Wales	
Saint John	Saint John	107.7	66.9	112	Route 100 east – Lorneville	Western terminus of Route 100
Saint John	Saint John	109.8	68.2	114	Route 7 north – Grand Bay–Westfield, Fredericton	Exit 97 (Route 7); southern terminus of Route 7
Saint John	Saint John	113.2	70.3	117	Route 100 (Fairville Boulevard)	Westbound exit only
Saint John	Saint John	114.9	71.4	119	Catherwood Street / Bleury Street to Route 100 – Reversing Falls	Signed as exits 119A–B westbound
Saint John	Saint John	116.3– 116.9	72.3– 72.6	120	Digby Ferry	
Saint John Harbour		117.7	73.1	Saint John Harbour Bridge		
Saint John	Saint John	117.9	73.3	121	Route 100 (Chesley Drive)	Eastbound exit / westbound entrance only
Saint John	Saint John	118.7	73.8	122	Route 100 east (Main Street) – Saint John Centre	Eastbound exit / Route 100 westbound to Route 1 westbound entrance only
Saint John	Saint John	119.2	74.1	123	Somerset Street to Route 100 – Saint John Centre	
Saint John	Saint John	121.2	75.3	125	Seely Street / Crown Street – Harbour Station	No access from eastbound Route 1 to westbound Seely Street / from eastbound Seely Street to eastbound Route 1
Saint John	Saint John	123.4	76.7	128	Ashburn Lake Road	Eastbound right-in/right-out interchange
Saint John	Saint John	123.8	76.9	128	Foster Thurston Drive / Ashburn Road	Westbound right-in/right-out interchange
Saint John	Saint John	124.8– 125.8	77.5– 78.2	129	Route 100 (Rothesay Avenue)	Contains an exit loop eastbound to switch directions to westbound.
Kings	Rothesay	129.0	80.2	133	Fox Farm Road to Route 100 – Rothesay	
Kings	Rothesay	132.8	82.5	137	Route 111 east to Route 100 / Campbell Drive – Fundy-St. Martins, Saint John Airport, Rothesay, Quispamsis	Signed as exits 137A–B eastbound; western terminus of Route 111
Kings	Quispamsis	137.6	85.5	141	Route 119 north – Quispamsis, Kingston, Gondola Point Ferry	Southern terminus of Route 119
Kings	Quispamsis	138.9	86.3	142	To Route 100 – Quispamsis, Nauwigewauk	Eastbound exit / westbound entrance only
Kings	Hampton	154.6	96.1	158	Route 100 west to Route 121 / Hall Road – Hampton	Eastern terminus of Route 100
Kings	Bloomfield	162.8	101.2	166	Bloomfield Ridge South Road – Bloomfield	
Kings	Valley Waters	171.7	106.7	175	Route 124 west / Route 865 south – Valley Waters, Apohaqui	Eastern terminus of Route 124; northern terminus of Route 865
Kings	Sussex	188.0	116.8	192	Route 121 / Riverview Drive East – Sussex, Apohaqui	
Kings	Sussex	189.0	117.4	193	Route 10 west / Roachville Road – Fredericton	Eastern terminus of Route 10; no access to westbound Route 2
Kings	Sussex	191.6	119.1	195	Route 890 east / Marble Street – Sussex, Smiths Creek	Western terminus of Route 890
Kings	Sussex Corner	194.5	120.9	198	Route 111 west / Route 114 east – Sussex Corner, Sussex, Fundy-St. Martins, Penobsquis	Eastern terminus of Route 111; western terminus of Route 114
Kings	Penobsquis	207.5	128.9	211	Route 114 – Alma, Penobsquis, Fundy National Park	
Kings	Anagance	219.1	136.1	223	Route 895 north – Portage Vale, Anagance	Southern terminus of Route 895
Westmorland	Three Rivers	228.9	142.2	232	Route 106 east / Route 905 south – Three Rivers, Elgin	Western terminus of Route 106; northern terminus of Route 905
Westmorland	River Glade	234.7	145.8	239	Route 106 – River Glade, Three Rivers	
Westmorland	River Glade	235.9– 238.1	146.6– 147.9	–	Route 2 (TCH) – Fredericton, Moncton	Exit 423 (Route 2)
1.000 mi = 1.609 km; 1.000 km = 0.621 mi: Incomplete access

== See also ==
- List of New Brunswick provincial highways
- East–West Highway (New England)
