= Simonds Parish, Saint John County, New Brunswick =

Simonds
- Parish
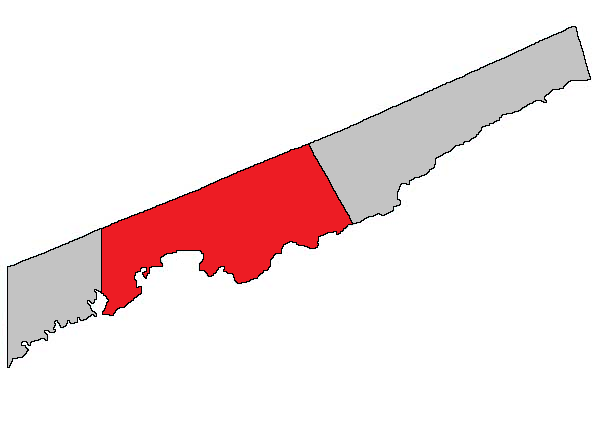
- Location within Saint John County; map erroneously includes City of Saint John within parish
- Coordinates: 45.33°N 65.78°W
- Country: Canada
- Province: New Brunswick
- County: Saint John County
- Erected: 1839

Area
  - Land: 281.06 km^{2} (108.52 sq mi)

Population (2021)
  - Total: 3,913
  - Density: 13.9/km^{2} (36/sq mi)
  - Change 2016-2021: ▲1.8%
  - Dwellings: 1,671
- Time zone: UTC-4 (AST)
  - Summer (DST): UTC-3 (ADT)
- Median Income*: $51,323 CDN
- Median household income, 2005 (all households)

Simonds is a geographic parish in Saint John County, New Brunswick, Canada. (Note: The Territorial Division Act divides the province into 152 parishes, the cities of Saint John and Fredericton, and one town of Grand Falls. The Interpretation Act clarifies that parishes include any local government within their borders.)

For governance purposes Simonds is divided between the village of Fundy-St. Martins and the Fundy rural district, both of which are members of the Fundy Regional Service Commission.

Prior to the 2023 governance reform, the parish was divided for governance purposes between the local service districts of Fairfield and the parish of Simonds. Fairfield and most of Simonds helped form Fundy-St. Martins, while the Red Head area of the Simonds LSD was assigned to the rural district. (Note: Maps still visible as thumbnails show the current and previous governance boundaries.)

Contrary to the map image on this page, Simonds does not and never has included the City of Saint John within its boundaries, although Saint John did annex part of Simonds in 1967.

== Origin of name ==
The parish may have been named in honour of Charles Simonds, Speaker of the House of Assembly when the parish was erected, or his family, who were prominent in the early history of the province.

== History ==
Simonds was erected in 1839 from Portland Parish.

In 1902 an error in the boundaries of Saint John was corrected, returning part of Simonds. The error occurred in 1889 when Saint John was amalgamated with Portland Parish and its boundary description was rewritten, misstating the boundary at Drurys Cove.

In 1973 the territory annexed by Saint John in 1967 was formally removed in the revision of the Territorial Division Act.

== Boundaries ==
Simonds Parish is bounded:

- on the north by the Kings County line;
- on the east by a line beginning at the shore of the Bay of Fundy and running northwesterly along the eastern line of a grant to Samuel Hugh at the mouth of Tynemouth Creek and its prolongation to the Kings County line;
- on the south by the Bay of Fundy;
- on the west by the City of Saint John.

== Communities ==
Communities at least partly within the parish; italics indicate a name no longer in official use

- Baxters Corner
- Black River
- Cape Spencer
- Coleraine
- Fairfield
- Gardner Creek
- Garnett Settlement
- Grove Hill
- Mispec
- Porter
- Primrose
- Quaco Road
- Rowley
- Tynemouth Creek
- Upper Loch Lomond
- West Beach
- Willow Grove

== Bodies of water ==
Bodies of water (Note: Not including brooks, ponds or coves.) at least partly in the parish:

- Black River
- Mispec River
- Ritchie River
- Emerson Creek
- Gardner Creek
- Tynemouth Creek
- Third Lake Thoroughfare
- Bay of Fundy
- Mispec Bay
- more than fifteen officially named lakes

== Islands ==
Islands in the parish:

- Split Rock

== Other notable places ==
Parks, historic sites, and other noteworthy places in the parish.

- Cape Spencer Light

== Demographics ==
=== Population ===
Population trend

| Census | Population | Change (%) |
|---|---|---|
| 2016 | 3,843 | ▲0.4% |
| 2011 | 3,828 | ▲1.8% |
| 2006 | 3,759 | ▼2.2% |
| 2001 | 3,844 | ▲0.5% |
| 1996 | 3,823 | ▲5.8% |
| 1991 | 3,615 | ▲10.4% |
| 1986 | 3,274 | N/A |

=== Language ===
Mother tongue (2016)

| Language | Population | Pct (%) |
|---|---|---|
| French only | 105 | 2.7% |
| English only | 3,655 | 97.3% |

== Access Routes ==
Highways and numbered routes that run through the parish, including external routes that start or finish at the parish limits:

- Highways
  - None
- Principal Routes
  - Route 111
- Secondary Routes:
  - Route 820
  - Route 825
- External Routes:
  - None

== See also ==
- List of parishes in New Brunswick
