= Lepreau Parish =

Coordinates: 45.23114°N 66.576805°W

- Parish
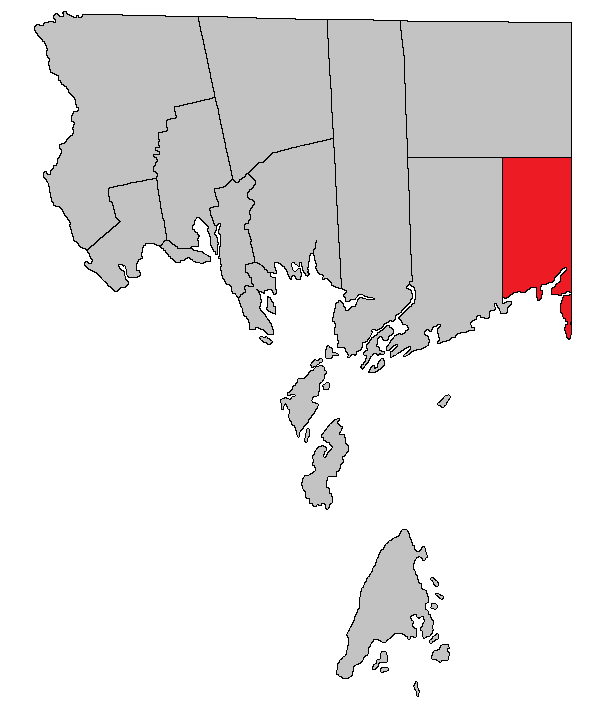
- Location within Charlotte County.
- Country: Canada
- Province: New Brunswick
- County: Charlotte
- Erected: 1857

Government
  - Type: Local service district

Area
  - Land: 209.52 km^{2} (80.90 sq mi)

Population (2021)
  - Total: 803
  - Density: 3.8/km^{2} (9.8/sq mi)
  - Change 2016-2021: ▲13.6%
  - Dwellings: 492
- Time zone: UTC-4 (AST)
  - Summer (DST): UTC-3 (ADT)

Lepreau is a geographic parish in Charlotte County, New Brunswick, Canada, (Note: The Territorial Division Act divides the province into 152 parishes, the cities of Saint John and Fredericton, and one town of Grand Falls. The Interpretation Act clarifies that parishes include any local government within their borders.) west of Saint John.

For governance purposes, the southern part of the parish is part of the incorporated rural community of Fundy Shores, while the north is part of the Southwest rural district, both of which are members of the Southwest New Brunswick Service Commission.

Prior to the 2023 governance reform, it comprised a single local service district (LSD), which was a member of the Southwest New Brunswick Service Commission (SNBSC).

The Point Lepreau Nuclear Generating Station is the parish's most notable feature and is located near its eastern border.

The Census subdivision of Lepreau Parish shares the parish's borders.

== Origin of name ==
Historian William Francis Ganong states that the name of the parish comes from Point Lepreau, the name being a corruption of French Pte. aux Napraux.

The parish's official spelling has varied:

- LePreau in 1857,
- Lepreaux in 1868, 1869, 1903, 1927, and 1952
- Le Preaux in 1877 and 1896
- Lepreau since 1973

== History ==
Lepreau Parish was erected from eastern Pennfield Parish in 1857. It originally included the eastern part of Clarendon Parish.

== Boundaries ==
Lepreau is bounded:

- on the north by a line running due west from the southernmost corner of Queens County;
- on the east by a line running true north from Point Lepreau;
- on the south by Maces Bay and the Bay of Fundy;
- on the west by true north from the mouth of the Pocologan River;
- including any islands within 2 miles (3.2 km) of the shore.

=== Evolution of boundaries ===
Lepreau's originally extended north to the county line.

In 1868 all of the parish north of the southern point of Queens County was included in the Clarendon District, a polling district that also included the northern part of Pennfield Parish.

In 1869 The Clarendon District was erected as Clarendon Parish and Lepreau's modern boundaries were established.

== Local service district ==
The local service district of the parish of Lepreau comprised the entire parish.

The LSD was established in 1970 to assess for fire protection; first aid & ambulance services were added in 1978.

In 2021, the LSD assesses for only the basic LSD services of fire protection, police services, land use planning, emergency measures, and dog control.

== Communities ==
Communities at least partly within the parish. italics indicate a name no longer in official use.

- Haggertys Cove
- Lepreau
- Little Lepreau
- Maces Bay (Old Ridge)
- Mink Brook
- New River
- New River Beach
- Pocologan
- Welch Cove

== Bodies of water ==
Bodies of water (Note: Not including brooks, ponds or coves.) at least partly within the parish.

- Lepreau River
  - North Branch Lepreau River
  - West Branch Lepreau River
- Little Lepreau River
- Little New River
- New River
- Pocologan River
- Bay of Fundy
- Maces Bay
- Lepreau Harbour
- New River Harbour
- Pocologan Harbour
- Little Lepreau Basin
- Lake of the Hills
- Ragged Falls Flowage
- more than 25 other officially named lakes

== Islands ==
Islands at least partly within the parish. italics indicates a name no longer in official use

- Head Island
- New River Island (Mole Island)
- Pocologan Island
- Salkeld Islands (Fothergill Islands)

== Other notable places ==
Parks, historic sites, and other noteworthy places at least partly within the parish.

- Lepreau Falls Provincial Park
- Lepreau River Wildlife Management Area
- McPhersons Point Protected Natural Area
- New River Beach Provincial Park
- New River Protected Natural Area
- Ragged Falls Protected Natural Area
- Salkeld Island Protected Natural Area

== Census data ==
=== Population ===
Canada census – Lepreau community profile

	2021	2016	2011
Population	803 (+13.6% from 2016)	708 (-6.0% from 2011)	752 (-8.7% from 2006)
Land area	209.52 km^{2} (80.90 sq mi)	209.62 km^{2} (80.93 sq mi)	209.40 km^{2} (80.85 sq mi)
Population density	3.8/km^{2} (9.8/sq mi)	3.4/km^{2} (8.8/sq mi)	3.6/km^{2} (9.3/sq mi)
Median age	51.2 (M: 50.8, F: 51.6)	53.0 (M: 51.3, F: 53.9)	48.2 (M: 47.8, F: 48.5)
Private dwellings	492 (total) 385 (occupied)	507 (total)	510 (total)
Median household income	$69,500	$57,216

References: 2021 2016 2011

Historical Census Data - Lepreau Parish, New Brunswick

Year	Pop.	±%
1991	900	—
1996	875	−2.8%

Year	Pop.	±%
2001	865	−1.1%
2006	824	−4.7%

Year	Pop.	±%
2011	752	−8.7%
2016	707	−6.0%

=== Language ===
Canada Census Mother Tongue - Lepreau Parish, New Brunswick
Census	Total	English			French			English & French			Other		
Year	Responses	Count	Trend	Pop %	Count	Trend	Pop %	Count	Trend	Pop %	Count	Trend	Pop %
2011	750	720	▼8.9%	96.00%	20	0.0%	2.67%	0	0.0%	0.00%	10	0.0%	1.33%
2006	820	790	▼5.4%	96.34%	20	▼20.0%	2.44%	0	0.0%	0.00%	10	0.0%	1.22%
2001	870	835	▼2.3%	95.98%	25	▲60.0%	2.87%	0	0.0%	0.00%	10	0.0%	1.15%
1996	875	855	n/a	97.71%	10	n/a	1.14%	0	n/a	0.00%	10	n/a	1.14%

== Access Routes ==
Highways and numbered routes that run through the parish, including external routes that start or finish at the parish limits:

- Route 1
- Route 780
- Route 795
