= Lepreau =

Lepreau may refer to several places and features in Charlotte County, New Brunswick, Canada:

- Lepreau, New Brunswick, an unincorporated community
- Lepreau Parish, a geographic parish

== See also ==
- Lepreau Falls Provincial Park
- Point Lepreau
- Point Lepreau Nuclear Generating Station
