= Scott Falls Dam =

Dam in New Brunswick, Canada

- Scott Falls Dam in 2026
- Interactive map of Scott Falls Dam
- Location: Musquash Parish, New Brunswick, Canada
- Coordinates: 45.186°N 66.357°W
- Owner: Government of New Brunswick

Dam and spillways
- Impounds: West Branch Musquash River

Scott Falls Dam is located on the West Branch Musquash River near Musquash, Saint John County, New Brunswick, Canada. The dam is part of the water-retention infrastructure of the Musquash watershed, which was developed for hydroelectric generation during the early 20th century.

== History ==
The New Brunswick Electric Power Commission developed its first hydroelectric project on the Musquash River. The dam and powerhouse were completed in the spring of 1922 at a cost of $2 million. In 1972, the Musquash hydro plant was sold to the Province of New Brunswick for water-storage purposes.

The provincial government continued to maintain and rehabilitate infrastructure throughout the Musquash watershed. In 2010–11, the Department of Natural Resources spent approximately $525,000 on the system, including studies of the remaining structures at Scott Falls. More than $15 million had been spent on rehabilitation of the watershed's infrastructure since 1999.

In 2023, Fisheries and Oceans Canada identified Scott Falls Dam as a restoration project near the Musquash Estuary Marine Protected Area that could improve habitat connectivity in the watershed.
