= New Brunswick Route 175 =

Highway in New Brunswick, Canada

Route 175

Route information
- Maintained by New Brunswick Department of Transportation
- Length: 26.8 km (16.7 mi)
- Existed: 2012–present

Major junctions
- East end: Route 1 north-east of Lepreau
- Route 790 / Route 795 in Lepreau; Route 1 in Pennfield Station
- West end: Route 176 / Route 785 in Pennfield

Location
- Country: Canada
- Province: New Brunswick
- Major cities: Pocologan

Highway system
- Provincial highways in New Brunswick; Former routes
← Route 172	→ Route 176

Route 175 is a 27 km (17 mi)-long mostly east–west secondary highway in southwest New Brunswick, Canada.

== Route description ==
The route's eastern terminus is at Route 1 (exit 86) north-east of Lepreau, New Brunswick. The road travels south to the western terminus of Route 795 and the northern terminus of Route 790 and becomes Lepreau Village Road as it enters Lepreau after crossing the Lepreau River. The route then turns south-west on the Lepreau Village Road as it enters Lepreau. Continuing south-west, the route passes the eastern terminus of Route 780 then Mink Brook, Haggertys Cove then New River Beach crosses the New River and passes New River Beach Provincial Park. The route continues through Pocologan after crossing the Pocologan River passing Crow Harbour as it passes Crow River. The route then turns north-west as it crosses Route 1 (exit 69) as it enters Pennfield Station. The route then passes through Pennfield Ridge as it enters Pennfield ending at the intersection of Route 785 and Route 176.

== History ==
This former section of Route 1 was once the main highway from Lepreau to Pennfield until October 2012 when the new 4 lane highway was opened and became Route 1.
