= Musquash =

Musquash may refer to:

== Animals ==
- Muskrat

== Places ==
- Musquash Parish, New Brunswick, Canada
  - Musquash, New Brunswick, an unincorporated community therein
- Musquash River (Ontario), a river in Ontario, Canada
- Musquash River (New Brunswick), a river in New Brunswick, Canada
- Musquash Island (Minnesota/Wisconsin border), a small island in Pool 8 of the Mississippi River
