= Head Island (New Brunswick) =

Island in New Brunswick, Canada

- Interactive map of Head Island

Geography
- Location: Bay of Fundy
- Coordinates: 45.1278°N 66.4702°W

Administration
- Canada
- Province: New Brunswick
- County: Charlotte County
- Parish: Lepreau Parish

Head Island is an undeveloped island located in Maces Bay, in the Lepreau Parish, New Brunswick, Canada.
