= Musquash Parish, New Brunswick =

Musquash
- Parish
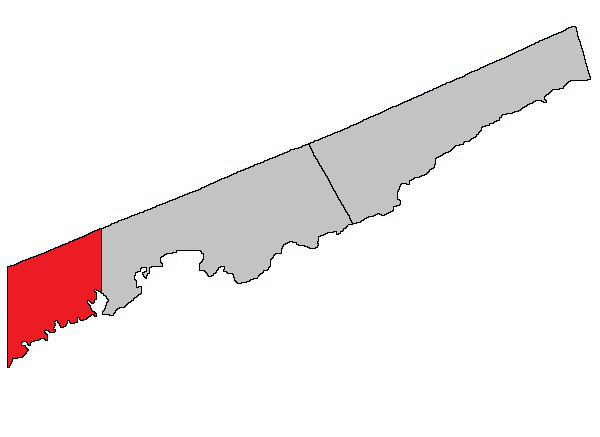
- Location within Saint John County. map erroneously shows Saint John as part of Simonds Parish
- Coordinates: 46.17°N 66.36°W
- Country: Canada
- Province: New Brunswick
- County: Saint John County
- Erected: 1877

Area
  - Land: 233.06 km^{2} (89.98 sq mi)

Population (2021)
  - Total: 1,253
  - Density: 5.4/km^{2} (14/sq mi)
  - Change 2016-2021: ▲4.9%
  - Dwellings: 594
- Time zone: UTC-4 (AST)
  - Summer (DST): UTC-3 (ADT)
- Median Income*: $71,680 CDN
- Median household total income, 2015 (all households)

Musquash is a geographic parish in Saint John County, New Brunswick, Canada. (Note: The Territorial Division Act divides the province into 152 parishes, the cities of Saint John and Fredericton, and one town of Grand Falls. The Interpretation Act clarifies that parishes include any local government within their borders.)

For governance purposes, the parish is part of the incorporated rural community of Fundy Shores, which is a member of the Southwest Regional Service Commission.

Prior to the 2023 governance reform, the parish formed the local service district of the parish of Musquash, which was a member of the Fundy Regional Service Commission (FRSC).

== Origin of name ==
The Provincial Archives of New Brunswick gives it origin as "derived from the Maliseet word for muskrat" but does not mention that word or give a source.

William F. Ganong has entries for Musquash Islands and Musquash Harbour, the former translated from the French I. aux Rats musquez, island of muskrats, the latter uncertain, both possibly related to Wolastoqey (Maliseet) words.

Musquash is a synonym of muskrat, possibly borrowed from Massachusett.

== History ==
Musquash was erected in 1877 from Lancaster Parish.

== Boundaries ==
Musquash Parish is bounded:

- on the north by the Kings County line;
- on the east by the City of Saint John;
- on the south by the Bay of Fundy;
- on the west by the Charlotte County line.

== Communities ==
Communities at least partly within the parish.

- Chance Harbour
- Dipper Harbour East
- Dipper Harbour West
- Five Fathom Hole
- Gooseberry Cove
- Little Lepreau
- Musquash
- Prince of Wales
- South Musquash

== Bodies of water ==
Bodies of water (Note: Not including brooks, ponds or coves.) at least partly within the parish.

- Little Lepreau River
- Musquash River
- Belvidere Stream
- Deer Lake Stream
- Fishing Stream
- Hanson Stream
- Menzies Stream
- Dipper Harbour Creek
- Ferguson Creek
- Goose Creek
- McLaughlin Creek
- Moose Creek
- Wetmore Creek
- West Branch Reservoir
  - Back Channel
  - The Narrows
- Bay of Fundy
  - Plumper Hole
- Maces Bay
- Chance Harbour
- Dipper Harbour
- Little Dipper Harbour
- Musquash Harbour
- Hepburn Basin
- Bonny Doone Lake
- more than twenty other officially named lakes

== Islands ==
Islands at least partly within the parish.

- Gooseberry Island
- Musquash Island
- Stillwater Island
- Man Rock
- Musquash Ledges
- Pork Ledge

== Other notable places ==
Parks, historic sites, and other noteworthy places at least partly within the parish.

- Dipper Harbour Back Cove Protected Natural Area
- Gooseberry Cove Protected Natural Area
- Loch Alva Protected Natural Area
- Log Falls Dam
- Musquash Estuary Protected Natural Area
- Point Lepreau
- Round Meadow Cove Protected Natural Area

== Demographics ==
=== Population ===
Population trend

| Census | Population | Change (%) |
|---|---|---|
| 2016 | 1,194 | ▼0.5% |
| 2011 | 1,200 | ▼2.8% |
| 2006 | 1,235 | ▼3.5% |
| 2001 | 1,280 | |

=== Language ===
Mother tongue (2016)

| Language | Population | Pct (%) |
|---|---|---|
| French only | 45 | 3.8% |
| English only | 1,125 | 94.1% |
| Both English and French | 5 | 0.4% |
| Other languages | 20 | 1.7% |

== Access Routes ==
Highways and numbered routes that run through the parish, including external routes that start or finish at the parish limits:

- Highways
  - Route 1
- Principal Routes
  - Route 111
- Secondary Routes:
  - Route 790
  - Route 795
- External Routes:
  - None

== See also ==
- List of parishes in New Brunswick
