= Chance Harbour, New Brunswick =

Community in New Brunswick, Canada

Chance Harbour
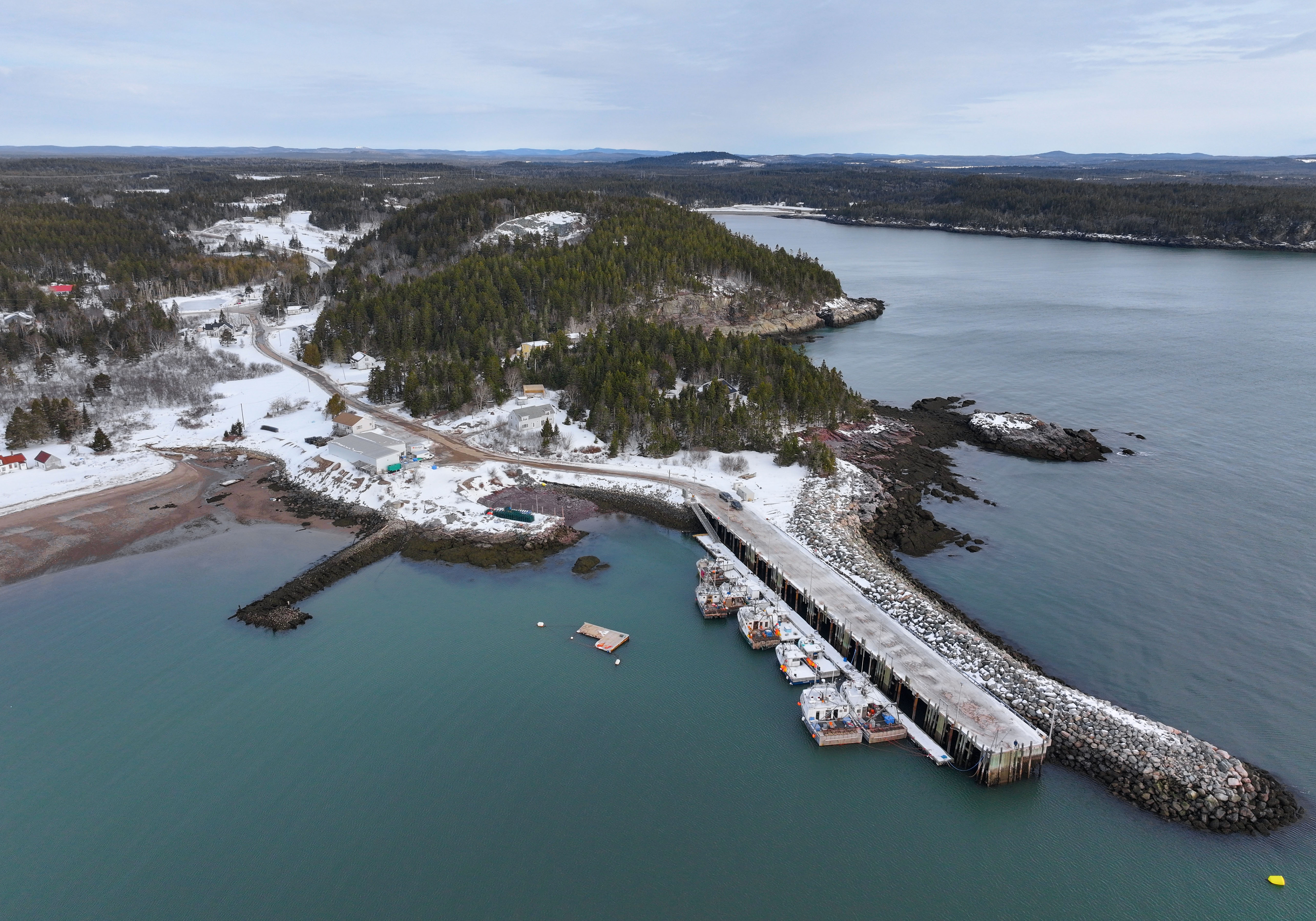
- Aerial view, 2025
- Interactive map of Chance Harbour
- Coordinates: 45.1282°N 66.3528°W
- Country: Canada
- Province: New Brunswick
- County: Saint John County
- Settled: 1784
- Time zone: UTC-4 (AST)
  - Summer (DST): UTC-3 (ADT)

Chance Harbour is a community on Route 790 in Saint John County, New Brunswick, Canada.

== History ==
Chance Harbour was settled in 1784 by United Empire Loyalists in what is now Musquash Parish. The Provincial Archives of New Brunswick records it as a small fishing and farming settlement by the mid-19th century, with a post office operating from 1866 to 1939.

A population of 150 was reported in both 1871 and 1898, alongside a local store and two churches. The community was one of several coastal settlements along the Bay of Fundy served by the Shore Line Railway, later part of the Canadian Pacific Railway’s operations between Saint John and St. George. The line, once used for freight and regional service, was abandoned in the late 20th century as rail traffic declined.

Local histories frequently group Chance Harbour with neighbouring communities such as Dipper Harbour and Maces Bay as small traditional fishing settlements.

== See also ==
- List of communities in New Brunswick

== Sources ==
- "Where is Home? – Chance Harbour". Provincial Archives of New Brunswick. Government of New Brunswick.
- "Chance Harbour (UNP) – DAEWP". Geographical Names Board of Canada. Natural Resources Canada.
- "CP Shore Line Subdivision". Traingeek.ca.
- "Chance Harbour, Dipper Harbour and Maces Bay". RubyCusack.com.
