= Musquash River (New Brunswick) =

- The Musquash watershed photographed from the International Space Station in March 2011

- Location of the Musquash River in New Brunswick
- Etymology: Abenaki: moskwas, literally "muskrat", also the Abenaki exonym for the Wolastoqiyik
- Native name: mesakaskwěl (Malecite-Passamaquoddy)

Location
- Country: Canada
- Province: New Brunswick

Physical characteristics
- Source: Confluence of West Branch and East Branch Musquash Rivers
  - location: Musquash, New Brunswick
  - coordinates: 45°11′08″N 66°19′26″W
- Mouth: Bay of Fundy
  - location: Musquash Harbour
  - coordinates: 45°8′30″N 66°14′41″W
- Length: 16.3 km (10.1 mi)
- Basin size: 470 km^{2} (180 sq mi)

The Musquash River is located about 20 kilometres (12 mi) southwest of Saint John, New Brunswick, Canada. It is approximately 16.3 kilometres (10 mi) long and drains an area of 470 square kilometres (180 sq mi). It has the largest ecologically intact estuary in the Bay of Fundy, which was designated a Marine Protected Area in 2006.

== Name ==
Musquash is a historical English word for muskrat, which derives from the Abenaki word for the animal, moskwas. The Abenaki also used this term as an exonym for the Wolastoqiyik. Maliseet Vocabulary gives the Wolastoqey name for the river as mesakaskwěl, which means "at the extending grass marshes". The Wolastoqey term appears in historical French documents as Micheoarcors, Mechascor, Mechecastor, etc., and may be the origin of the name of Maces Bay.

== Description ==
=== Upper watershed ===
The Musquash River is formed from the confluence of two branches, the West Branch flowing out of Queens Lake via Sherwood Lake, and the East Branch out of Loch Alva. Loch Alva is the largest lake in the watershed and one of the deepest lakes in New Brunswick, covering 763 hectares (1,890 acres) and having a maximum depth of 43.9 metres (144 ft). American eel, brook trout, lake trout and landlocked salmon are found in the lake, and there is a stand of old-growth red spruce on its shore. Sherwood Lake covers 226.3 hectares (559 acres) and has a maximum depth of 17.4 metres (57 ft). It is local biodiversity hotspot, hosting several rare plant varieties and a stand of white pine over 70 years old.

Loch Alva Protected Natural Area covers about 220 square kilometres (85 sq mi) of the Musquash watershed upstream of the hydroelectric dams. The exposed summit of Turtle Mountain is the highest point in the area. Animals found in the area include black bear, moose, lynx, bobcat, pine marten, bald eagle and osprey.

=== Hydropower and water supply infrastructure ===
Hydroelectric structures exist on both the West and East Branches. The Scott Falls Dam on the West Branch was decommissioned in the 1970s, but the dams on the East Branch remain operational. The Musquash generating station held three 2.5-megawatt generators at one point. It was closed in 2009 when the last of its generators broke down, and dismantled in 2016.

A pumping station was built on the East Branch Musquash reservoir in the early 1970s. It transfers water via Menzies Lake to the Spruce Lake watershed, which supplies industrial water to Saint John.

=== Main river and estuary ===
The East and West Branches meet near the community of Musquash south of New Brunswick Route 1. From here the Musquash River takes a meandering course through extensive salt marshes, some of which are dyked by Ducks Unlimited Canada to create habitat for waterfowl. Spartina alterniflora dominates lower areas of the salt marsh. Two former United States Navy ships, USS LSM-46 and LSM-56, lie abandoned on the south side of the river upstream of Five Fathom Hole.

At Five Fathom Hole, where the only boat launch on the Musquash is located, the river turns south and flows into Musquash Harbour, which contains intertidal mudflats on both sides. The river channel broadens past Musquash Island, and the mouth of the harbour is flanked by the rocky headlands of Western Head and Musquash Head. Tidal range in the estuary is about 6 to 8 metres (20 to 26 ft), and the mouth of the harbour has water depths of 6 to 16 metres (20 to 52 ft).

Fish species found in the harbour include Atlantic silverside, winter flounder, rainbow smelt, shorthorn sculpin and Atlantic tomcod. A herring fishery previously existed in the estuary, but declined in the 1980s and no herring weirs have operated in the Musquash since 1987. Lobster and rarely scallop are fished in the estuary. Formerly periwinkles and clams were harvested, but these activities are no longer permitted in the estuary. The estuary is also closed to Ascophyllum rockweed harvesting, but dulse harvesting continues on an irregular basis. The Wolastoqiyik harvest sweetgrass, which grows in the upper edges of the salt marshes.

The estuary provides habitat for many nesting and migratory waterfowl and shorebird species, including American black duck, green-winged teal, pied-billed grebe, white-winged scoter, surf scoter, black guillemot, common eider and semipalmated sandpiper. Seals haul out at Musquash Island and Musquash Head.

Musquash Estuary Marine Protected Area (MPA) covers 7.4 square kilometres (2.9 sq mi) and includes Musquash River and the lower parts of its East and West Branches; Musquash Harbour; and Gooseberry Cove on the west side of Western Head. It protects waters below the ordinary water mark at low tide, as well as the seabed and subsoil to a depth of 2 metres (6 ft 7 in). An additional 4.0 square kilometres (1.5 sq mi) lying between the ordinary water level at low and high tides, designated the Administered Intertidal Area, is also managed by Fisheries and Oceans Canada. A further 2,309 hectares (5,710 acres) surrounding the MPA is managed by the Nature Conservancy of Canada (NCC) as Musquash Estuary Nature Reserve, and is the NCC's largest property in Atlantic Canada.

== History ==
Remains of the Scott Falls Dam on the West Branch Musquash River in 2026.

A portage between Nerepis River and Robin Hood Lake was used by the Wolastoqiyik to access the Bay of Fundy via Loch Alva and the Musquash river system, and is inscribed on the Canadian Register of Historic Places as the Old Portage Trail. The privateer Captain Baptiste spent the winter of 1694–1695 in Musquash Harbour with his corvette La Bonne.

The first land grant ever made under the Great Seal of New Brunswick was for 500 acres (200 ha) in the Musquash estuary near Five Fathom Hole. It was registered on August 25, 1785, to Thomas Menzies, a United Empire Loyalist, and his family.

In 1836 Moses Henry Perley purchased 32,000 acres in the Musquash watershed, naming the property Inglewood Manor. This property was eventually acquired by the Inglewood Pulp and Paper Company, which leased sporting privileges to the Inglewood Fish and Game Association based in Boston, Massachusetts. In 1903, a fire tore through the Musquash watershed, destroying the town of Musquash and the timber on the forest lands.

The Inglewood property was expropriated by the province in 1920 to build a hydroelectric dam and power plant. This was the first project undertaken by the New Brunswick Electric Power Commission, now known as NB Power. The litigation over compensation for the expropriated land reached the Judicial Committee of the Privy Council, Canada's highest court of appeal at the time. Construction was completed in spring 1922, and in February 1923 a transmission line was completed between Musquash and Moncton. Flooding in April 1923 washed out part of the dam on the West Branch, killing one person.

In the late 1960s, the Loch Alva area was proposed as a wilderness provincial park, but was passed over in favour of the creation of Mount Carleton Provincial Park in 1970. In 1998, Musquash Estuary was proposed as a candidate site for a Marine Protected Area by the Conservation Council of New Brunswick, with support from the Fundy North Fishermen's Association, and it received this designation on December 14, 2006. The provincial government established the Loch Alva and Musquash Protected Natural Areas in 2003. The latter is now called Musquash Estuary Protected Natural Area and is divided into Crown and private (NCC) land components.
