= Gooseberry Island (New Brunswick) =

Island in New Brunswick, Canada

- Interactive map of Gooseberry Island

Geography
- Location: Bay of Fundy
- Coordinates: 45°08′20″N 66°15′40″W

Administration
- Canada
- Province: New Brunswick
- County: Saint John
- Parish: Musquash

Gooseberry Island is an undeveloped island in the Musquash Parish, Saint John County, New Brunswick, Canada.

In August 1849, the schooner Matilla, loaded with plaster, was wrecked on Gooseberry Island though the crew were saved. By 1851, a beacon had been placed on the headland of Gooseberry Island, with the letters GI on it.
