= Musquash Island =

Island in New Brunswick, Canada

- Interactive map of Musquash Island

Geography
- Location: Bay of Fundy
- Coordinates: 45°09′56″N 66°14′21″W

Administration
- Canada
- Province: New Brunswick
- County: Saint John
- Parish: Musquash

Musquash Island is an undeveloped tidal island in Musquash Parish, Saint John County, New Brunswick, Canada. It is situated in the middle of Musquash Harbour, the estuary of the Musquash River, across from Cheeseman Beach. Low tide in the harbour exposes mud flats which reach out to the island.
