= Portland Parish, New Brunswick =

Former parish in New Brunswick, Canada

Portland Parish was a geographic parish in Saint John County, New Brunswick, Canada, until 1889.

== History ==
Portland Parish originally contained all lands between Saint John and Saint Martins Parish. The eastern part of the parish was erected as Simonds Parish in 1839. The parish was incorporated as a town in 1871, promoted to a city in 1883, and amalgamated with Saint John in 1889.
