= 1974 Saint John gas explosion =

Industrial disaster in New Brunswick, Canada

- Date: January 4, 1974
- Time: 11:37 p.m. (AST)
- Location: Eastern end of the Reversing Falls Bridge, Saint John, New Brunswick, Canada; 45°15′34″N 66°05′12″W
- Type: Explosion, fire
- Cause: Ignition of spilled gasoline after a truck collided with a gasoline pump
- Deaths: 5
- Injuries: 6

The 1974 Saint John gas explosion was an accidental gas explosion and fire at an Irving Oil service station on January 4, 1974. located at the eastern end of the Reversing Falls Bridge in Saint John, New Brunswick, Canada, on January 4, 1974. The incident resulted in the deaths of five people and injuries to six others.

== Background ==
The Irving Reversing Falls Service Station was a gas station operated by Irving Oil, located near the eastern end of the Reversing Falls Bridge. It was one of Irving Oil's major stations in the city.

== Incident ==
On the evening of January 4, 1974, a Friday, at approximately 11:37 p.m. AST, a tractor-trailer unit owned by Lunn's Haulaway Ltd. and Speedway Express Ltd., and operated by Ivan R. Lunn, entered the service station to purchase diesel fuel. While maneuvering, Lunn struck and knocked over one of the gasoline pumps. The impact caused gasoline to spill and flow into the station's basement through unsealed openings beneath the dispensers. Vapours built up from the gasoline were ignited, causing an explosion that completely destroyed the service station and sent a shock wave throughout the city.

=== Casualties ===
Five people were killed by the explosion. Three were gas station employees (Kenneth Ernest Dunham, David John McLaggan, Aubrey Eugene Johnson), and two were employed by the trucking companies (Ivan R. Lunn, William M. Corner). Six others were injured.

== Aftermath ==
In the years following the explosion, nine civil actions were filed for property damages totaling $543,406.99, representing claims from over 200 individuals and corporations. Additionally, Irving sought $450,142 for the loss of the station while the trucking companies counterclaimed for their vehicle. The cases were heard in the Queen's Bench Division of the New Brunswick Supreme Court. On July 21, 1978, Justice Stuart Stratton ruled that Irving Oil was 75% liable due to negligence in the station's design. The remaining 25% liability was assigned to Lunn for knocking over the dispenser.

The station was rebuilt following the incident and continued operations until 1998.
