= Pennfield Ridge, New Brunswick =

Pennfield Ridge
- Unincorporated community
- Location within New Brunswick.
- Coordinates: 45°07′12″N 66°41′30″W
- Country: Canada
- Province: New Brunswick
- County: Charlotte
- Parish: Pennfield
- Electoral Districts Federal: New Brunswick Southwest
- Provincial: Charlotte-The Isles

Government
  - Type: Local service district
- Time zone: UTC-4 (AST)
  - Summer (DST): UTC-3 (ADT)
- Postal code(s): E5H
- Area code: 506
- Highways: Route 175

Pennfield Ridge is a Canadian unincorporated community in Charlotte County, New Brunswick.

== History ==
- Pennfield Ridge's parish was founded by the Quakers in 1786 and named for William Penn (1644-1718), founder of Pennsylvania.
- Pennfield Ridge was the location of RCAF/RAF Station Pennfield Ridge.

== Communities ==
The following locations reside within the community boundaries:

- Pennfield Station (45°07′33″N 66°39′36″W) – located in the eastern part of Pennfield Ridge

== Transport ==
Up until October 2012, Route 1 ran through this community. It has been changed to Route 795 with the Route 1 Gateway Project.

== See also ==
- List of communities in New Brunswick
