= Bethel, New Brunswick =

Bethel
- Unincorporated community
- Location within New Brunswick
- Coordinates: 45°09′31″N 66°54′56″W
- Country: Canada
- Province: New Brunswick
- County: Charlotte County
- Parish: Saint Patrick Parish

Government
  - Type: Local service district
- Time zone: UTC-4 (AST)
  - Summer (DST): UTC-3 (ADT)
- Postal code: E5C
- Area code: 506
- Highways: Route 1, Route 760

Bethel is an unincorporated community in Saint Patrick Parish, Charlotte County, in southwestern New Brunswick, Canada. The community lies approximately 4.3 km (2.7 mi) east-southeast of Digdeguash.

Bethel is known locally for Ossie’s Seafood Take-Out.
