= Simms Corner =

- Interactive map of Simms Corner

Location
- Saint John, New Brunswick Canada
- Coordinates: 45.2565°N 66.0926°W
- Roads at junction: Route 100, Fairville Boulevard, Bridge Road, Lancaster Avenue, Main Street West

Construction
- Type: At-grade intersection
- Maintained by: New Brunswick Department of Transportation and Infrastructure

Simms Corner is a major road junction in the west side of Saint John, New Brunswick, Canada. It is located where multiple roads including Route 100 intersect and is well-known for its complex layout and traffic congestion.

== History ==
Simms Corner was named after the historic T.S. Simms & Co. Limited paint brush factory, which operated on the site from 1912 until its closure in 2013 and demolition the following year.

== Traffic and infrastructure ==
Simms Corner has been frequently described as an "infamous" intersection. It is well-known for being a traffic bottleneck, intersecting Route 100, Lancaster Avenue and Main Street West, along with having a rail line that crosses the roads twice. Its inefficiencies have been cited as a cause for economic impacts such as slowing down supply chains connected to the Port of Saint John. Efforts and proposals to redesign Simms Corner have been made.
