= Lepreau Falls Provincial Park =

Provincial park in New Brunswick, Canada

- IUCN category IV (habitat/species management area)
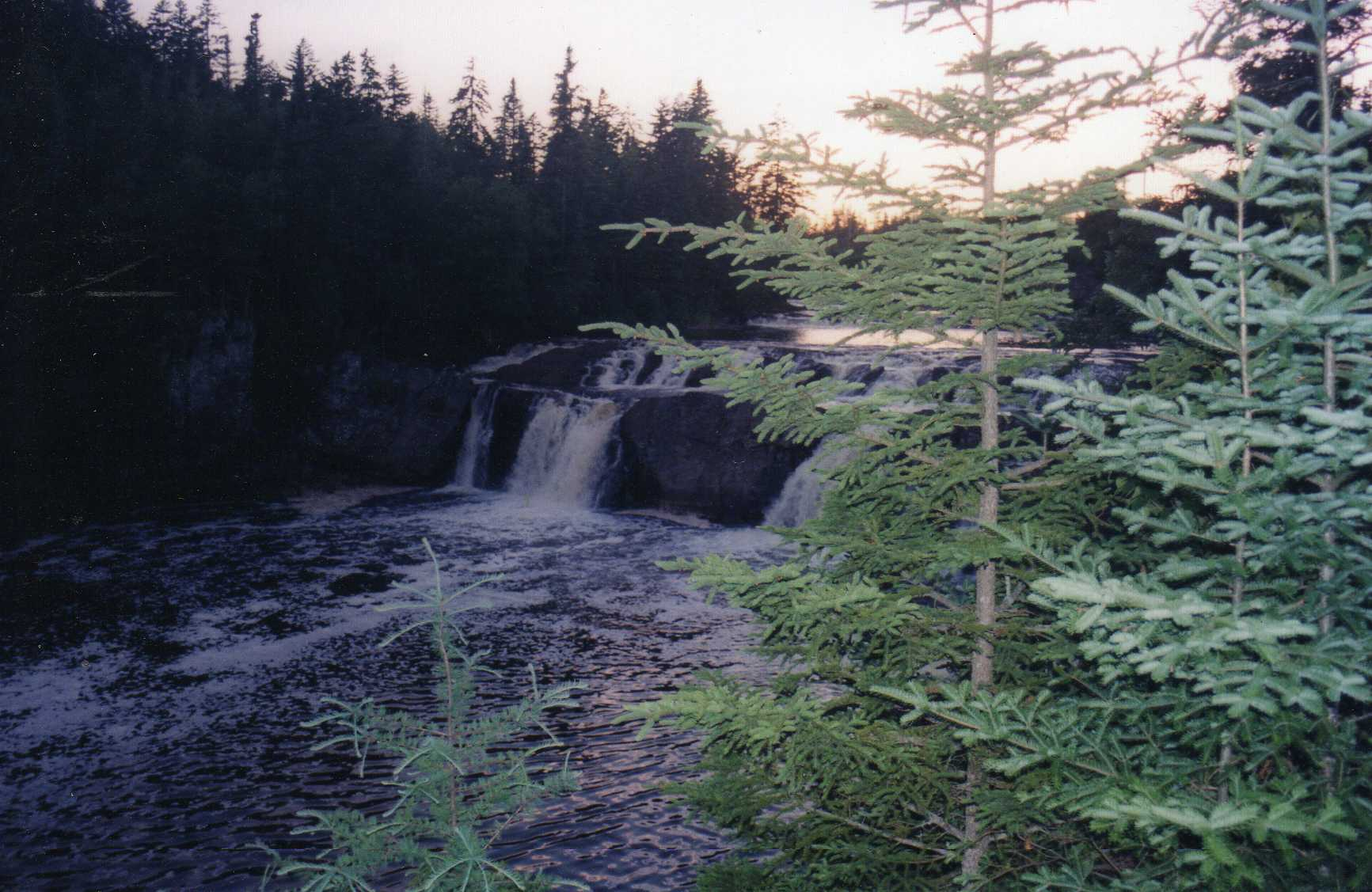
- Interactive map of Lepreau Falls Provincial Park
- Nearest city: Saint John, New Brunswick
- Coordinates: 45°10′6″N 66°27′37″W
- Governing body: Government of New Brunswick

Lepreau Falls Provincial Park is a provincial park located in Lepreau, New Brunswick.

The name is derived from the French la pereau, the little rabbit.

The park was developed in 1956.

Lepreau Falls marks the western terminus of the Stonehammer Geopark.
