= River Glade, New Brunswick =

Community in New Brunswick, Canada

River Glade
- Rural Community
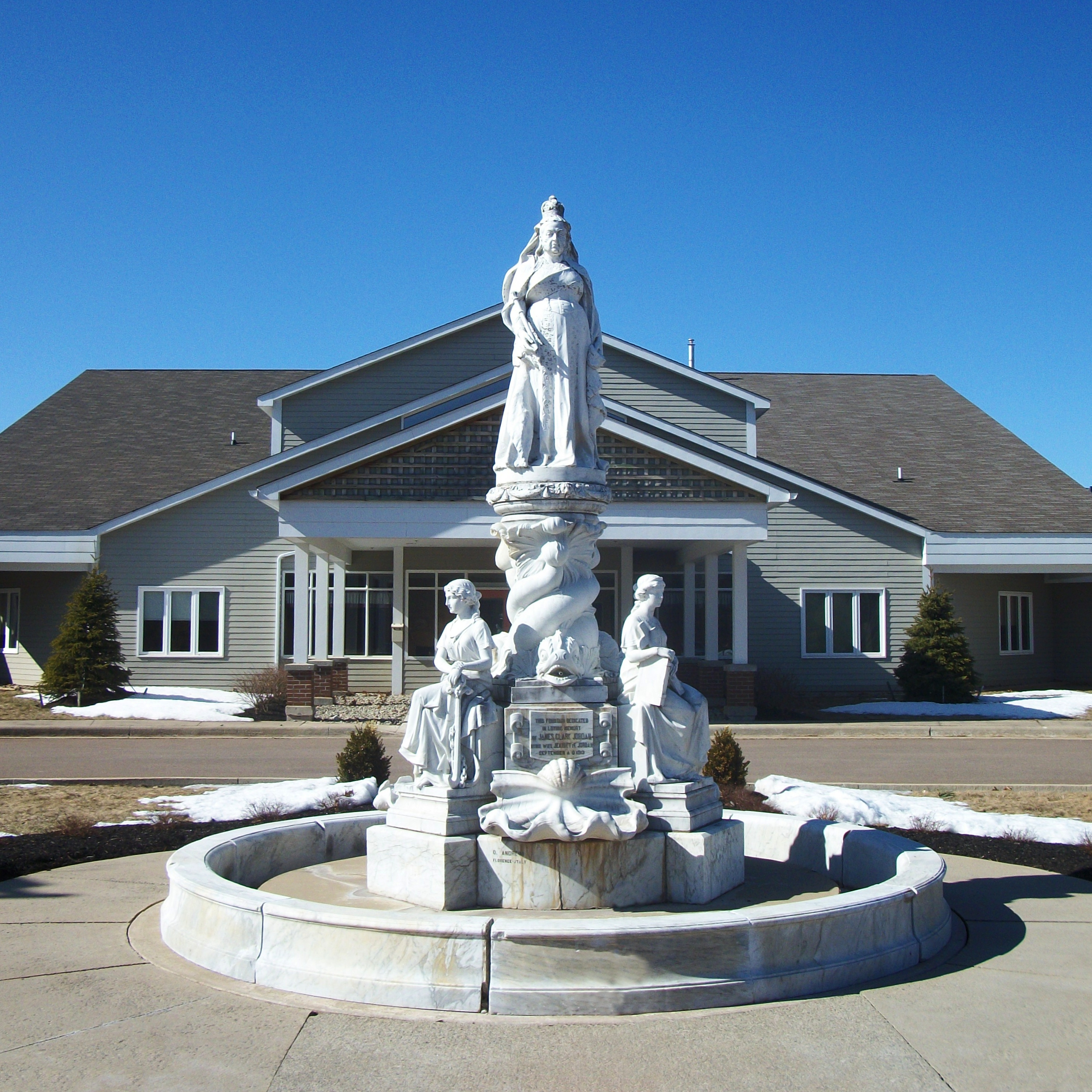
- Statue of Queen Victoria in The Glades. Sculpted in marble, it was erected in 1913 by Jordan LifeCare founder Jeanette Jordan in memory of her late husband.

- Location within New Brunswick
- Coordinates: 45.9872°N 65.11694°W
- Country: Canada
- Province: New Brunswick
- County: Westmorland County
- Parish: Salisbury Parish
- Electoral Districts Federal: Fundy Royal
- Provincial: Petitcodiac
- Time zone: UTC-4 (Atlantic (AST))
  - Summer (DST): UTC-3 (ADT)

River Glade is a Canadian rural community in Westmorland County, New Brunswick. The Community centres on the intersection of Route 106 and Sanitorium Road, just east of the intersection of Route 2 and Route 1.

As part of the 2023 New Brunswick local governance reform, River Glade became part of the town Salisbury.

== Places of note ==
- Petty International Raceway
- Jordan LifeCare Centre - main employer in nearby community of The Glades.
- River Glade MX Race Track

== See also ==
- List of communities in New Brunswick
