= New Brunswick Route 825 =

Highway in New Brunswick, Canada

Coordinates: 45.276094°N 65.792656°W

Route 825

Route information
- Maintained by New Brunswick Department of Transportation
- Length: 26 km (16 mi)

Major junctions
- East end: Route 111 in Bains Corner
- West end: Route 111 in Loch Lomond

Location
- Country: Canada
- Province: New Brunswick

Highway system
- Provincial highways in New Brunswick; Former routes
← Route 820	→ Route 845

Route 825 is a 26.3-kilometre (16.3 mi) long mostly east–west secondary highway in the southwestern portion of New Brunswick, Canada.

== Route description ==
Most of the route is in Saint John County.

The route's eastern terminus is close to Bains Corner at Route 111. The route travels south through Coleraine as it heads towards the Bay of Fundy. The route then travels southeast around the bay as it enters Gardner Creek and Black River, where the route begins to travel northwest as Garnett Settlement Rd. It passes Garnett Settlement, continues through a mostly forested area, and ends in Loch Lomond near the Saint John Airport on Route 111. The section in city limits uses "Garnett Settlement Road" for civic addressing purposes.
