= New Brunswick Route 795 =

Highway in New Brunswick, Canada

Coordinates: 45.137008°N 66.518097°W

Route 795

Route information
- Maintained by New Brunswick Department of Transportation
- Length: 8 km (5.0 mi)

Major junctions
- East end: Route 790 in Musquash
- West end: Route 175 north-east of Lepreau

Location
- Country: Canada
- Province: New Brunswick

Highway system
- Provincial highways in New Brunswick; Former routes
← Route 790	→ Route 820

Route 795 is a 8.4-kilometre (5.2 mi) long mostly east–west secondary highway in the south-western portion of New Brunswick, Canada, also named Wetmore Creek Rd.

== Route description ==
The route is in western Saint John County.

The route's eastern terminus is near Anderson Lake. It travels mostly east crossing Wetmore Creek, then Hanson Stream where it runs parallel to Route 1, then crossing Atkinson Brook, ending at the intersection of Route 175 and the northern terminus of Route 790 near Lepreau.
