= New River Beach Provincial Park =

Provincial park of New Brunswick, Canada

New River Beach Provincial Park _{Parc Provincial de la Nouvelle Plage Fluviale (French)}
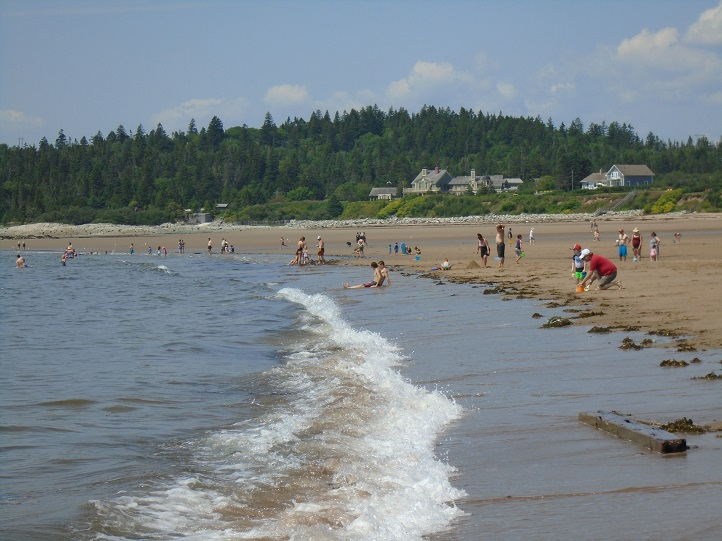
- New River Beach
- Interactive map of New River Beach Provincial Park _{Parc Provincial de la Nouvelle Plage Fluviale (French)}
- Location: Maces Bay, New Brunswick
- Nearest city: Saint John
- Coordinates: 45°08′10″N 66°31′46″W
- Area: 17 ha (42 acres)
- Established: 1960
- Governing body: Government of New Brunswick

New River Beach Provincial Park is a provincial park located near Maces Bay, New Brunswick, Canada. The park features a licensed restaurant, 99 campsites, four rustic shelters, forested camping areas, scenic coastal nature trails, a designated picnic area, and a pristine tidal beach. Since 2021, the park has been the production location for the CBC reality series Race Against the Tide.

It is administered by the Nature Trust of New Brunswick, following a donation by Robert Stewart.

Across from the beach is New River Island.

== Geography ==
New River Beach Provincial Park spans 368 hectares (899 acres) along the New River, a tributary flowing into the Bay of Fundy. The park is divided by Highway 175 and bordered by the Bay of Fundy to the south, residential areas to the east and west, and forested land to the north.

- Location: Southern coast of Charlotte County, New Brunswick
- Proximity to major communities: Approximately 46 km from Saint John and 58 km from Saint Andrews
- Key geographic features: Barnaby Head, Maces Bay, and the Bay of Fundy
- Main access routes: NB Route 1 and Highway 175

The park is situated within the Fundy Coastal Eco-District, which stretches along the entire southern coastline of New Brunswick. This eco-district extends from the eastern side of Passamaquoddy Bay to the eastern side of Shepody Bay, and also includes the Western and Outer Isles, such as Grand Manan, Campobello, Deer Island, and Machias Seal Island.

== Flora and fauna ==
Vegetation along the coast consists mainly of hardy plant species adapted to marine environments with minimal topsoil. Dominant shrubs include bog laurel and wild blueberries. On Barnaby Head, the spruce bog supports a variety of bog plants such as Labrador tea, bog cranberry, sundew, and pitcher plants—two of which are insectivorous.

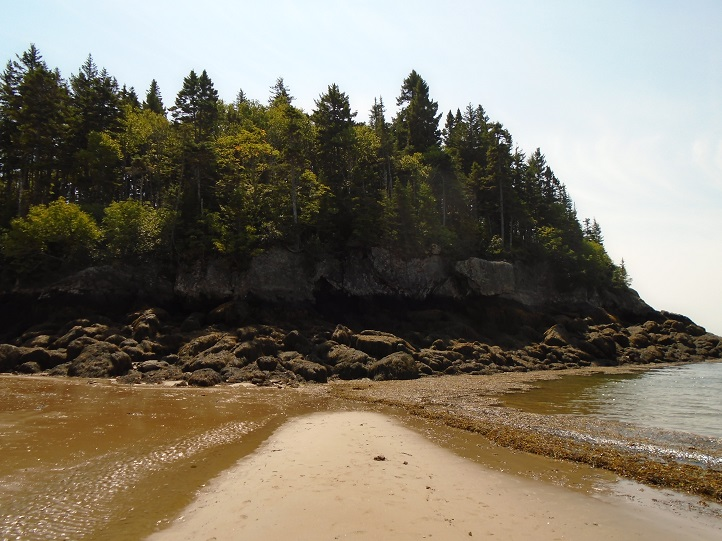
High water mark at New River Beach

The coastal zone of New River Beach is frequented by a wide range of bird species including gulls, great and double-crested cormorants, ospreys, eagles, goshawks, great blue herons, and razorbills. Peregrine falcons have also been spotted farther inland. The nearby Maces Bay/Point Lepreau region is recognized as an Important Bird Area by BirdLife International, Bird Studies Canada, and Nature Canada, serving as a critical migratory stopover for waterfowl. Mammals such as moose, white-tailed deer, and black bears are occasionally observed in the campground and throughout the park. The marine environment in the area is rich in biodiversity, supporting both invertebrate and vertebrate species. Common organisms along the foreshore include soft-shelled clams, sand dollars, and rock crabs. Expansive seaweed beds provide habitat for various species, including lobster.

Fish species found in this part of the Bay of Fundy include herring, flounder, mackerel, and halibut. Barnaby Point offers occasional views of whales such as Minke and North Atlantic right whales, as well as harbour porpoises, seals, and Atlantic white-sided dolphins. The region also hosts an active inshore fishery, with lobster, scallops, clams, and herring being commonly harvested. Additionally, aquaculture operations are prevalent in the area. The New River, a tributary of the Bay of Fundy, sustains a variety of freshwater species, including salmonids. Its headwaters lie more than 30 km inland and remain largely undeveloped along their course.

== See also ==
- Bay of Fundy
- Saint John, New Brunswick
- List of New Brunswick parks
- List of beaches in Canada
