= New Brunswick Route 790 =

Highway in New Brunswick, Canada

Coordinates: 45.102365°N 66.402397°W

Route 790

Route information
- Maintained by New Brunswick Department of Transportation
- Length: 31 km (19 mi)

Major junctions
- East end: Route 1 in Musquash
- West end: Route 175 / Route 795 near Lepreau

Location
- Country: Canada
- Province: New Brunswick

Highway system
- Provincial highways in New Brunswick; Former routes
← Route 785	→ Route 795

Route 790 is a 31.1-kilometre (19.3 mi) long mostly east–west secondary highway in the southwestern portion of New Brunswick, Canada.

== Route description ==
The route's eastern terminus is in the community of Musquash at exit 96 on Route 1 close to the West Branch Musquash River. It then travels southeast through mostly swamp and farm area, past Anderson Lake, to the eastern terminus of Route 795. The route then passes Javies Lakes as it enters Chance Harbour. The route passes Beldings Cove as it follows the shore of the Bay of Fundy. Crossing into Dipper Harbour, the route turns east and circles Dipper Harbour before continuing east to Point Lepreau and Maces Bay, where the route turns north. As the route continues, it passes through Little Lepreau and ends at Route 795 and Route 175.

The route's eastern terminus is in the community of Musquash at exit 96 on Route 1 close to the West Branch Musquash River. It then travels southeast through mostly swamp and farm area, past Anderson Lake, to the eastern terminus of Route 795. The route then passes Javies Lakes as it enters Chance Harbour. The route passes Beldings Cove as it follows the shore of the Bay of Fundy. Crossing into Dipper Harbour, the route turns east and circles Dipper Harbour before continuing east to Point Lepreau and Maces Bay, where the route turns north. As the route continues, it passes through Little Lepreau and ends at Route 795 and Route 175.
