= Lockhart Lake (New Brunswick) =

Lake in New Brunswick, Canada

- Location within New Brunswick
- Location: Little Ridge, Harvey Parish, New Brunswick
- Coordinates: 45°39′32″N 64°44′41″W
- Basin countries: Canada
- Surface elevation: 5 m (16 ft)

Lockhart Lake is a small saltwater lake in Little Ridge, Harvey Parish, New Brunswick, Canada. It is approximately 15 minutes driving distance from Alma, New Brunswick. Tourists can kayak from the Cape Enrage river into it.

== See also ==
- List of lakes of New Brunswick
