= Montague Chamberlain =

Canadian-American businessman, naturalist, and ethnographer (1844-1924)

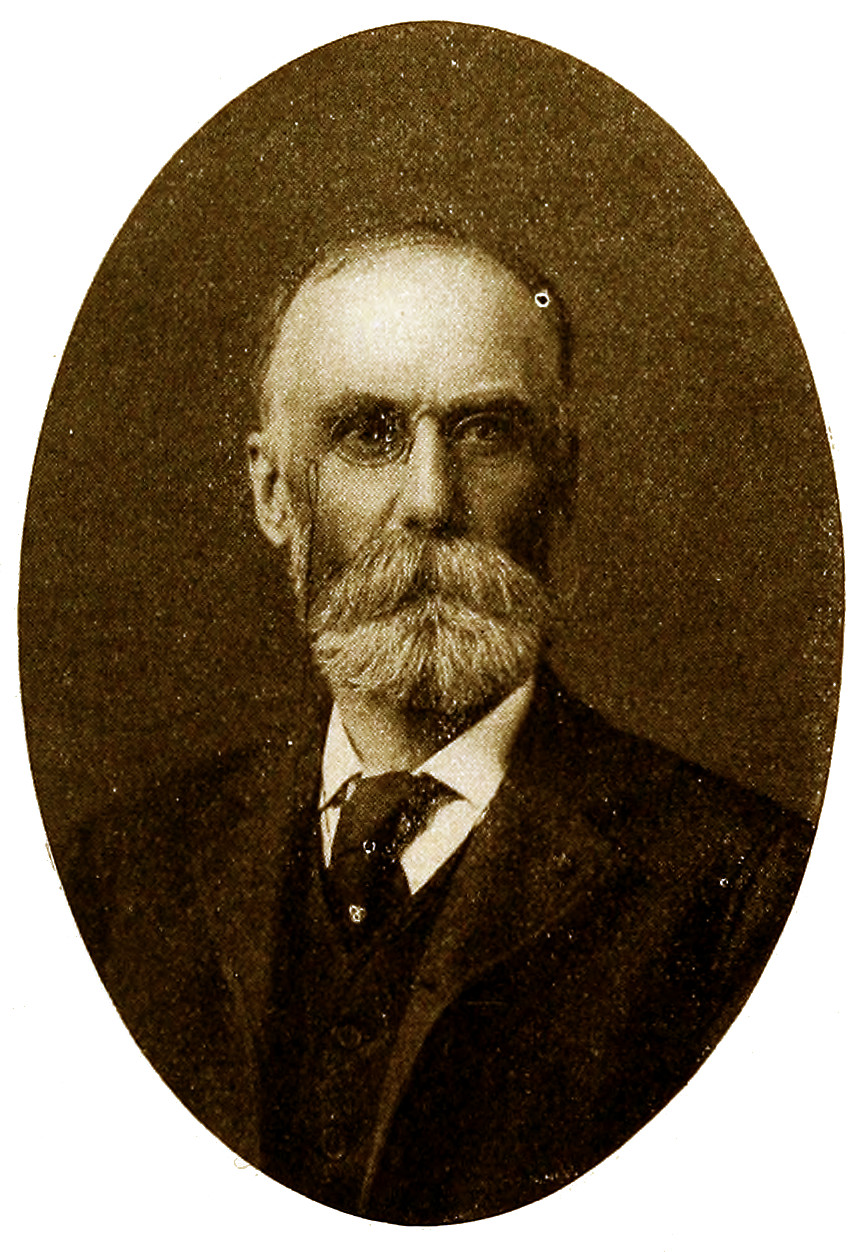
- Portrait from Bird Lore (1903)
- Born: April 5, 1844; St. John, New Brunswick, British North America
- Died: February 10, 1924 (aged 79)
- Occupations: businessman, naturalist, and ethnographer
- Spouse: Anna Sartoris

Montague Chamberlain (April 5, 1844 – February 10, 1924) was a Canadian-American businessman, naturalist, and ethnographer.

== Biography ==
Chamberlain was born in St. John, New Brunswick, British North America. He spent the first few decades of his life as a bookkeeper and later manager of a grocery company in St. John. In his mid-twenties, he also became a dedicated amateur ornithologist. In 1883 he co-founded the American Ornithologists' Union, which today stakes its claim as "the oldest and largest organization in the New World devoted to the scientific study of birds." In 1888 Chamberlain became a resident member and editor for the Nuttall Ornithological Club, and a founding member of the American Ornithologists' Union. After quitting the grocery business, he became the assistant secretary of the Harvard Corporation in 1889 and the secretary of the Lawrence Scientific School in 1893.

Chamberlain was married at the age of 63, to Anna Sartoris Prout of Petersburg, Virginia. Their marriage lasted six years before Anna died.

Chamberlain died in Boston, Massachusetts, United States, in 1924. The same year, Theodore Sherman Palmer, secretary of the American Ornithologists' Union, wrote an obituary of Chamberlain in The Auk. Percy Algernon Taverner later published an obituary of Chamberlain in Canadian Field-Naturalist. Palmer's obituary includes a lament that Chamberlain made no direct contributions to ornithology during the last twenty years of his life.

== Writings ==
He was a frequent contributor to The Bulletin of the Nuttall Ornithological Club, The Auk (of which he was also a founding associate editor ), and Bulletin of the Natural History Society of New Brunswick, the first of which published his A Catalogue of the Birds of New Brunswick: With brief notes relating to their migrations, breeding, relative abundance, etc. in 1882. He also authored the following books:

- A Catalogue of Canadian Birds, 1887
- Birds of Greenland, 1889
- The Church Army, Damrell and Upham, 1897
- Maliseet Vocabulary, Harvard Cooperative Society, 1899
- The Penobscot Indians, 1899

Chamberlain's interest in the Native Americans grew after spending time at the Penobscot haven of Indian Island in Maine, where he helped start a museum. He maintained that a Penobscot had saved his grandfather's life. Chamberlain also became familiar with the nearby and related Passamaquoddy and Maliseet, leading to his drafting of the first significant English-Maliseet dictionary. Although Maliseet is still spoken today by around 1,500 people, Maliseet Vocabulary has become a valuable source on the Maliseet language, as the first published, substantial characterization of the language, recorded at a relatively early date. The book includes translations for about 1,600 Maliseet words; perhaps owing in part to Chamberlain's particular interests as a naturalist and bird enthusiast, 481 of the 1,600 words are related to plants and animals, including 124 Maliseet words for different types of birds.
