= New River Island =

Island in New Brunswick, Canada

- Interactive map of New River Island

Geography
- Location: Bay of Fundy
- Coordinates: 45°7′9″N 66°32′34″W

Administration
- Canada
- Province: New Brunswick
- County: Charlotte County
- Parish: Lepreau Parish

New River Island (also called Mole Island, George's Island and Mink Island) is an undeveloped island across from the beach of New River Beach Provincial Park in Lepreau Parish, New Brunswick, Canada.

It is administered by the Nature Trust of New Brunswick, following a donation by Robert Stewart.

== History ==
In 1869, the barque Genii was wrecked after mooring along New River Island during the Saxby Gale, kedging and being lost with 11 deaths aboard.

In 1884, James Mealey Jr drowned while crossing to New River Island intending to hunt birds.

== Nature ==
The island is an important nesting site for eider ducks.

Berried female lobsters have been noted as ecologically significant on its north and southwestern edge.
