= Black River, New Brunswick =

Black River, New Brunswick may refer to:

- Black River, Saint John County
- Black River-Hardwicke
- Black River, Kent County
- Black River (New Brunswick), a river in Northumberland County
