= Pierre Basquet =

Pierre Basquet (fl. 1841–52) was, most likely, a Maliseet by birth who became part of the Mi'kmaq community in the Restigouche area.

Basquet was involved in work with Moses Henry Perley who was New Brunswick's commissioner of Indian affairs. He is chiefly remembered in history for the embarrassment he caused British authorities and the lieutenant governor of New Brunswick on two trips that he made to England.
