= Clarendon Parish, New Brunswick =

Coordinates: 45.421076°N 66.625471°W

Clarendon Parish Paroisse de Clarendon
- Parish
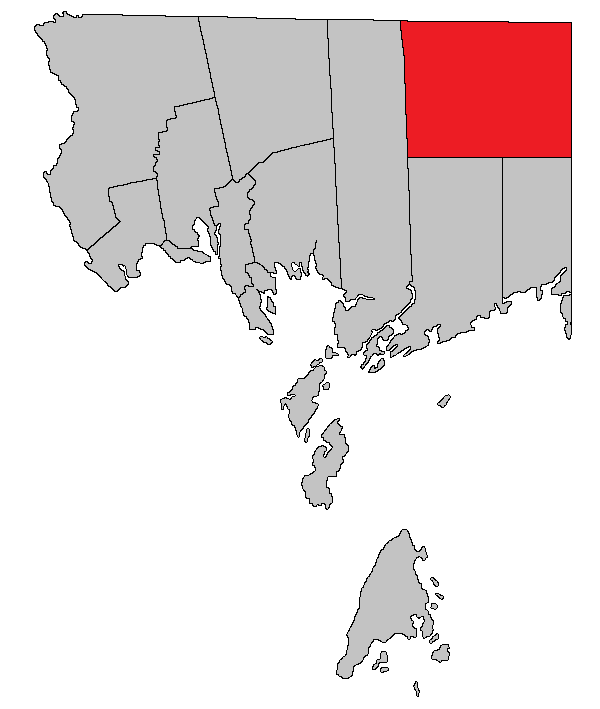
- Location within Charlotte County.
- Country: Canada
- Province: New Brunswick
- County: Charlotte County
- Erected: 1869
- Named for: George Villiers, 4th Earl of Clarendon

Area
  - Land: 492.11 km^{2} (190.00 sq mi)

Population (2021)
  - Total: 66
  - Density: 0.1/km^{2} (0.26/sq mi)
  - Change 2016-2021: ▲4.8%
  - Dwellings: 64
- Time zone: UTC-4 (AST)
  - Summer (DST): UTC-3 (ADT)

Clarendon is a geographic parish in Charlotte County, New Brunswick, Canada, (Note: The Territorial Division Act divides the province into 152 parishes, the cities of Saint John and Fredericton, and one town of Grand Falls. The Interpretation Act clarifies that parishes include any local government within their borders.) located in the interior to the north of Point Lepreau and southwest of CFB Gagetown.

For governance purposes, Clarendon is part of the Capital Region rural district, which is a member of the Capital Region Regional Service Commission.

Prior to the 2023 governance reform, the parish comprised a single local service district (LSD), which was a member of Capital Region Service Commission (RSC11).

The Census subdivision of the same name shares the parish's boundaries.

== Origin of name ==
The parish was named for Clarendon Settlement, which in turn was named in honour of the Earl of Clarendon, British Secretary of State for Foreign Affairs at the time of it being laid out.

== History ==
Clarendon was erected in 1869 from Lepreau and Pennfield Parishes.

The area was first laid out for settlement in 1856, with the Clarendon Settlement being largest. Much of the parish was never surveyed for settlement, most of the surveyed lots were never granted, and many granted lots were later reconveyed to the Crown.

In 1868 the Clarendon District was created as a polling district taking in the northern part of Lepreau and Pennfield Parishes.

== Boundaries ==
Clarendon Parish is bounded:

- on the north by the Sunbury and Queens County lines;
- on the east by Queens County;
- on the south by a due west line from the southernmost corner of Queens County;
- and on the west by the prolongation of the eastern line of grants that cross Lake Utopia.

== Local service district ==
The local service district of the parish of Clarendon comprised the entire parish.

The LSD was established in 1975 to assess for fire protection; recreational and sport facilities was added in 2008.

In 2021, the LSD assessed for community & recreation services in addition to the basic LSD services of fire protection, police services, land use planning, emergency measures, and dog control. The taxing authority is 507.00 Clarendon.

== Communities ==
Communities at least partly within the parish. italics indicate a name no longer in official use

- Back Clarendon
- Pleasington

== Bodies of water ==
Bodies of water (Note: Not including brooks, ponds or coves.) at least partly within the parish.

- North Branch Lepreau River
- South Branch Oromocto River
- West Branch Lepreau River
- Piskahegan Stream
- South Oromocto Lake
  - The Basin
- York Dam Flowage
- more than fifty other official named lakes

== Islands ==
Islands at least partly within the parish.

- Bradt Island (in McDougall Lake)
- Horse Island (in South Oromocto Lake)

== Other notable places ==
Parks, historic sites, and other noteworthy places at least partly within the parish.

- Lepreau River Wildlife Management Area
- Little Tomoowa Lake Protected Natural Area

== Demographics ==
Revised census figures based on the 2023 local governance reforms have not been released.

=== Population ===
Canada census – Clarendon community profile

| | 2021 | 2016 | 2011 |
| Population | 66 (+4.8% from 2016) | 63 (+21.2% from 2011) | 52 (-26.8% from 2006) |
| Land area | 492.11 km^{2} (190.00 sq mi) | 492.19 km^{2} (190.04 sq mi) | 492.91 km^{2} (190.31 sq mi) |
| Population density | 0.1/km^{2} (0.26/sq mi) | 0.1/km^{2} (0.26/sq mi) | 0.1/km^{2} (0.26/sq mi) |
| Median age | 58.8 (M: 58.4, F: 61.2) | 59.2 (M: 59.8, F: 57.7) | 58.0 (M: 59.5, F: 56.5) |
| Private dwellings | 64 (total) 40 (occupied) | 90 (total) | 76 (total) |
| Median household income | | $44,928 | $.N/A |

Notes: Income data for this area has been suppressed for data quality or confidentiality reasons.
References: 2021 2016 2011

Historical Census Data - Clarendon Parish, New Brunswick

| Year | Pop. | ±% |
|---|---|---|
| 1991 | 53 | — |
| 1996 | 51 | −3.8% |

| Year | Pop. | ±% |
|---|---|---|
| 2001 | 41 | −19.6% |
| 2006 | 71 | +73.2% |

| Year | Pop. | ±% |
|---|---|---|
| 2011 | 52 | −26.8% |
| 2016 | 63 | +21.2% |

=== Language ===
Canada Census Mother Tongue - Clarendon Parish, New Brunswick 2001 & 2006 language data for this area has been suppressed for data quality or confidentiality reasons.
| Census | Total | French | | | English | | | French & English | | | Other | | |
| Year | Responses | Count | Trend | Pop % | Count | Trend | Pop % | Count | Trend | Pop % | Count | Trend | Pop % |
| 2011 | 50 | 50 | 0.0% | 100.00% | 0 | 0.0% | 0.00% | 0 | 0.0% | 0.00% | 0 | 0.0% | 0.00% |
| 1996 | 50 | 50 | n/a | 100.00% | 0 | n/a | 0.00% | 0 | n/a | 0.00% | 0 | n/a | 0.00% |

== Access Routes ==
Highways and numbered routes that run through the parish, including external routes that start or finish at the parish limits:

- Highways
  - None
- Principal Routes
  - Route 101
- Secondary Routes:
  - Route 785
- External Routes:
  - None
