= Salkeld Islands =

Island in New Brunswick, Canada

- Interactive map of Salkeld Islands

Geography
- Location: Bay of Fundy
- Coordinates: 45°6′18″N 66°30′23″W
- Area: 8 ha (20 acres)

Administration
- Canada
- Province: New Brunswick
- County: Charlotte
- Parish: Lepreau Parish

The Salkeld Islands (also called The Brothers, previously Fothergill Islands) are two undeveloped islands in the Pennfield Parish of Charlotte County, New Brunswick, Canada in the Bay of Fundy.

The islands are named after John Salkeld, a Quaker Loyalist from Florida who settled in Mace's Bay in 1784 lending his name to a small settlement on the mainland. His grandson, also named John Salkeld, lived on the Wolf Islands and was disowned from the Quaker church.

William Francis Ganong notes the "twin islands" referenced in the works of Samuel Champlain and appearing on his 1612 map of the region is a reference to the Salkelds.

In 1992, the Salkeld Islands were gifted to the provincial government by Saint John Terminals Ltd. It is maintained as a Protected Natural Area by the Department of Natural Resources, due to its role as a seabird colony.

Bordered by high cliffs and covered in grass, the two islands form a Protected Natural Area. They are nesting grounds for Black-backed gulls, Herring gulls, Eider ducks, Oldsquaw, Common Golldeneye, Great Cormorants and Double-crested Cormorants. They are an important nesting site for eider ducks.
