= Little Ridge, Albert County, New Brunswick =

Coordinates: 45.6414°N 64.7479°W

Location of Little Ridge in New Brunswick

Little Ridge is a small community just outside Alma, New Brunswick.

It has a population of 21 and a summer population of 33. It is also a rocky ridge which most of the community is on. Fog from the Bay of Fundy often gets blown in from the southwest and gets trapped on its Western edge. Lockhart Lake, New Brunswick is inside this community, with an arid area around it. The only road running through the community is Route 915, running from Alma, New Brunswick to Riverside-Albert, New Brunswick.

== See also ==
- List of communities in New Brunswick
