= Pocologan Island =

Island in New Brunswick, Canada

- Interactive map of Pocologan Island

Geography
- Location: Bay of Fundy
- Coordinates: 45°6′17″N 66°34′14″W

Administration
- Canada
- Province: New Brunswick
- County: Charlotte
- Parish: Pennfield Parish

Pocologan Island is an undeveloped island in the Pennfield Parish of Charlotte County, New Brunswick, Canada in the Bay of Fundy.

In 2016, Cooke Aquaculture worker Jason Giddens rescued Graham Teare whose boat had overturned leaving Pocologan Island.

Andy's Ledge Salmon filed for an aquaculture site between Red Head and Pocologan Island.
