= Moses Henry Perley =

Moses Henry Perley (31 December 1804 – 17 August 1862) was a lawyer and entrepreneur in colonial New Brunswick.

== Biography ==
Born in Maugerville, Sunbury County, Perley received his primary school education in Saint John. In 1829, he married Jane, daughter of the United Empire Loyalist Isaac Ketchum. They had eight children. Perley studied law and was called to the Bar in 1830.

Perley played a dominant role in producing the New Brunswick Indian Act of 1844. He had an extensive knowledge of Indian affairs through his travels and communication throughout the province. He was appointed commissioner for Indian affairs and further influenced matters covered under the Indian Act.

Between 1849 and 1852 he wrote several studies on the prospects for the further development of the province's ocean and river fisheries, a task which saw him travel some 900 miles throughout New Brunswick (500 of them by canoe) collecting information and statistics. Perley's findings on these trips were detailed in his Report on the Fisheries of the Gulf of Saint Lawrence (1849), Report on the Sea and River Fisheries of New Brunswick, Within the Gulf of Saint Lawrence and Bay of Chaleur (1850), and Report upon the Fisheries of the Bay of Fundy (1851), all of which were compiled in a one-volume omnibus entitled Reports on the Sea and River Fisheries of New Brunswick (1852). His knowledge of the fishery also meant that he had a commanding influence on the fishery legislation drafted between 1849 and 1852.

Perley was appointed as emigrant agent for the province and, in 1855, was appointed a fishery commissioner to enforce the Canadian–American Reciprocity Treaty. He died after an illness on board HMS Desperate near Labrador while engaged in duties associated with this post.

== Bibliography ==
- Reports on the sea and rivers fisheries of New Brunswick (1850)
- Reports on the sea and rivers fisheries of New Brunswick 2nd edition (1852)
- A hand-book of information for emigrants to New Brunswick (1857)
- On the early history of New Brunswick (1891)
- Camp of the Owls : sporting sketches and tales of Indians (1990)

== See also ==
- Pierre Basquet
