= Digdeguash, New Brunswick =

Digdeguash Diktequeskʼ
- Unincorporated community
- Location within New Brunswick
- Coordinates: 45°10′53″N 66°57′42″W
- Country: Canada
- Province: New Brunswick
- County: Charlotte County
- Parish: Saint Patrick Parish

Government
  - Type: Local service district
- Time zone: UTC-4 (AST)
  - Summer (DST): UTC-3 (ADT)
- Postal code: E5C
- Area code: 506
- Highways: Route 1

Digdeguash is an unincorporated community in Saint Patrick Parish, Charlotte County, in southwestern New Brunswick, Canada. The community is located near the mouth of the Digdeguash River and lies approximately 2.3 km (1.4 mi) northeast of Bocabec.

== History ==
The name Digdeguash derives from the Passamaquoddy name Diktequeskʼ, as identified by historian and geographer William Francis Ganong. The name has historically been pronounced “di-gi-dee-wash”.

A post office operated in Digdeguash from 1866 until 1871. In 1871, the community had a reported population of approximately 150 residents.

== See also ==
- List of communities in New Brunswick
