= Saint John County, New Brunswick =

County in New Brunswick, Canada

Saint John
- County
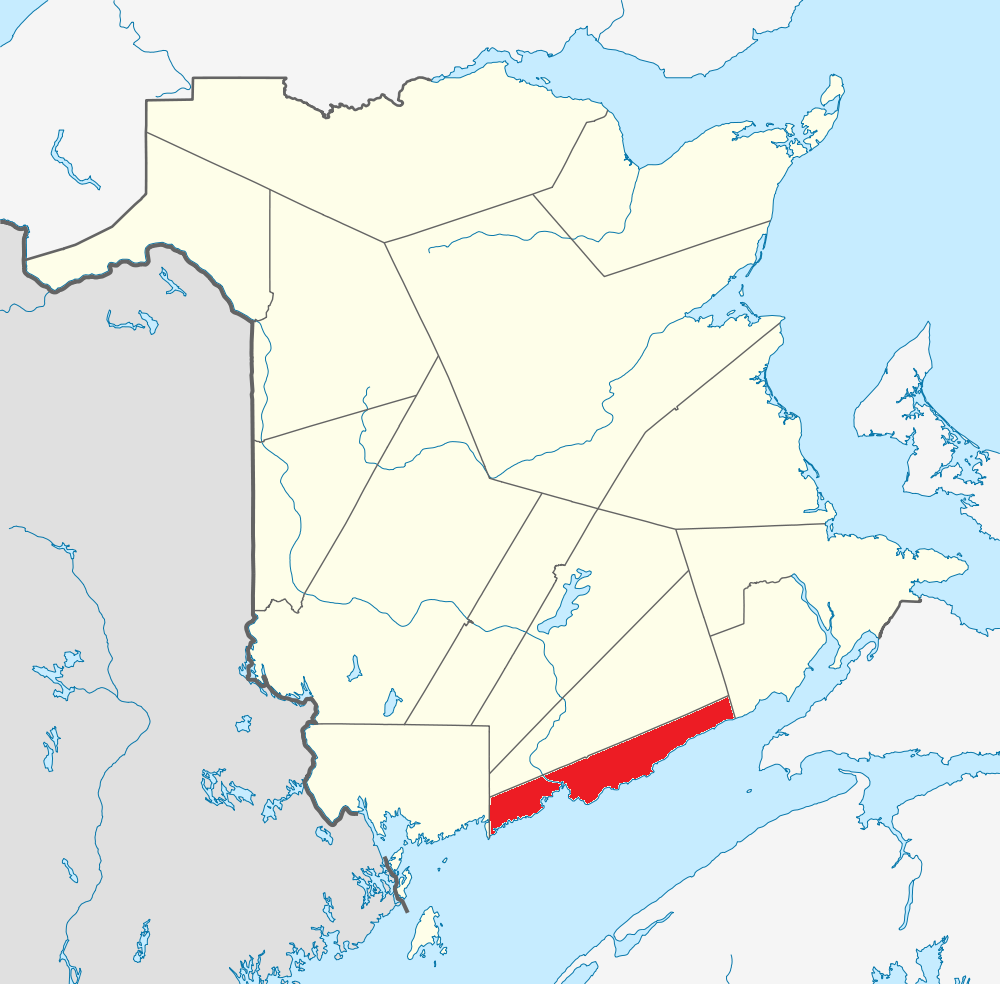
- Location within New Brunswick.
- Coordinates: 45°18′N 66°00′W
- Country: Canada
- Province: New Brunswick
- Established: 1785

Area
  - Land: 1,461.05 km^{2} (564.11 sq mi)

Population (2021)
  - Total: 76,558
  - Density: 52.4/km^{2} (136/sq mi)
  - Change 2016-2021: ▲3.4%
  - Dwellings: 36,964
- Time zone: UTC-4 (AST)
  - Summer (DST): UTC-3 (ADT)
- Area code: 506

Saint John County (2021 population: 76,558) is located in southern New Brunswick, Canada. The city of Saint John dominates the county. Elsewhere in the county, tourism is focused around the Bay of Fundy.

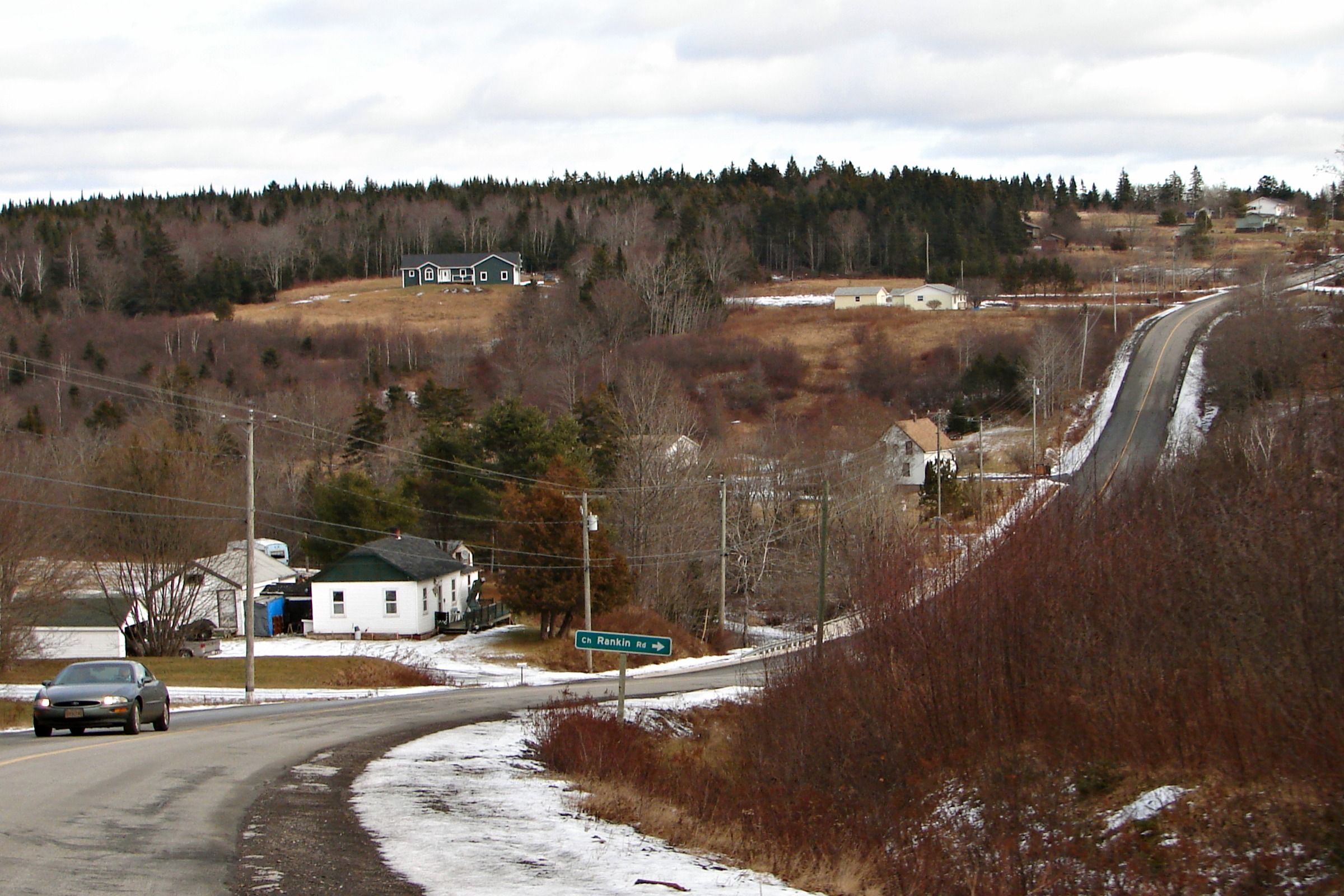
Fairfield, New Brunswick

== Census subdivisions ==
=== Communities ===
There are two municipalities within Saint John County (listed by 2016 population):

Official name	Designation	Area km^{2}	Population	Parish
Saint John	City	315.96	67,575	Simonds
Fundy-St. Martins	Village	2.35	276	Saint Martins

=== Parishes ===
The county is subdivided by the Territorial Division Act (Section 27) into one city and three parishes (listed by 2016 population):

Official name	Area km^{2}	Population	Municipalities	Unincorporated communities
Saint John (city)	315.96	67,575	Saint John (city)	
Simonds	280.86	3,843		Baxters Corner / Black River / Cape Spencer / Coleraine / Fairfield / Gardner Creek / Garnett Settlement / Grove Hill / Lake View Estates / Mispec / Otter Lake / Primrose / Quaco Road / Simonds / Upper Golden Grove / Upper Loch Lomond / West Beach / Willow Grove
Musquash	235.33	1,194		Chance Harbour / Dam Road / Dipper Harbour East / Dipper Harbour West / Five Fathom Hole / Gilmore Subdivision / Gooseberry Cove / Little Lepreau / Musquash / Point Lepreau / Prince of Wales / Sherwood Road / South Musquash
Saint Martins	629.20	1,132	St. Martins (village)	Bains Corner / Bay View / Burchills Flats / Chapel Flats / Chester / Drawlin Hill / Fair View / Hardingville / Little Beach / Mosher Hill / Orange Hill / Porter Road / Salmon River / Shanklin / Tynemouth Creek / West Quaco

== Demographics ==
Historical Census Data - Saint John County, New Brunswick
Year	Pop.	±%
1991	81,462	—
1996	79,302	−2.7%
2001	76,407	−3.7%
2006	74,621	−2.3%
2011	76,550	+2.6%
2016	74,020	−3.3%
2021	76,558	+3.4%

As a census division in the 2021 Census of Population conducted by Statistics Canada, Saint John County had a population of 76,558 living in 34,634 of its 36,964 total private dwellings, a change of 3.4% from its 2016 population of 74,020. With a land area of 1,461.05 km^{2} (564.11 sq mi), it had a population density of 52.4/km^{2} (135.7/sq mi) in 2021.

Canada census – Saint John community profile

	2021	2016	2011
Population	76,558 (+3.4% from 2016)	74,020 (-3.3% from 2011)	76,550 (+2.6% from 2006)
Land area	1,461.05 km^{2} (564.11 sq mi)	1,463.70 km^{2} (565.14 sq mi)	1,464.53 km^{2} (565.46 sq mi)
Population density	52.4/km^{2} (136/sq mi)	50.6/km^{2} (131/sq mi)	52.3/km^{2} (135/sq mi)
Median age	44.4 (M: 42.4, F: 46)	44.1 (M: 42.6, F: 45.5)	42.3 (M: 40.7, F: 43.8)
Private dwellings	34,635 (total)	36,825 (total)	36,426 (total)
Median household income		$53,887	$48,963

References: 2021 2016 2011

=== Language ===
Canada Census Mother Tongue - Saint John County, New Brunswick
Census	Total	English			French			English & French			Non-official languages		
Year	Responses	Count	Trend	Pop %	Count	Trend	Pop %	Count	Trend	Pop %	Count	Trend	Pop %
2016	72,645	65,645	▼4.2%	90.36%	3,075	▼12.0%	4.23%	410	▲28.1%	0.56%	3,695	▲35.3%	5.08%
2011	75,085	68,540	▲3.0%	91.28%	3,495	▼3.2%	4.65%	320	▼5.9%	0.43%	2,730	▼1.1%	3.64%
2006	73,255	66,545	▼4.4%	90.84%	3,610	▼4.1%	4.93%	340	▲51.1%	0.46%	2,760	▲69.3%	3.77%
2001	75,195	69,575	▼4.2%	92.53%	3,765	▲3.1%	5.01%	225	▼37.5%	0.30%	1,630	▲25.4%	2.17%
1996	77,925	72,615	n/a	93.19%	3,650	n/a	4.68%	360	n/a	0.46%	1,300	n/a	1.67%

== Access Routes ==
Highways and numbered routes that run through the county, including external routes that start or finish at the county limits:

- Highways
  - Route 1
  - Route 7
- Principal Routes
  - Route 100
  - Route 111
- Secondary Routes:
  - Route 790
  - Route 795
  - Route 820
  - Route 825
- External Routes:
  - None

== See also ==
- List of communities in New Brunswick
