= Maliseet Vocabulary =

Study of the Maliseet language

Maliseet Vocabulary is a book that provided the first published, substantial study of the Maliseet language. It was written by Montague Chamberlain and published by the Harvard Cooperative Society in 1899.

Maliseet Vocabulary has become a valuable source on the Maliseet language. Chamberlain credits Wolastoqew native James Pual of Apohaqui as his principal assistant in gathering Maliseet vocabulary. The book includes an introduction by Professor William F. Ganong of Smith College, who calls it the first work in the field, and asserts that the young people of the Wolastoqiyik "care nothing" for their language and culture, and that the conditions making the book possible were rapidly slipping away with the passing of the (then-) present generation, although this prediction has not been borne out.

Maliseet Vocabulary includes English translations for about 1,600 Maliseet words, arranged in 29 categories. Given Chamberlain's status as a naturalist and bird enthusiast, he managed to record 481 Maliseet words related to plants and animals, including 124 Maliseet words for different types of birds. Some of this profusion of natural-world vocabulary is also inherent in the Wolastoqey culture: for example, the book includes six different Maliseet words for birch bark, depending on the status of the bark. 98 of the words are place name proper nouns, and 156 words are listed as of post-European-contact origin (mostly constructed of Maliseet roots while a few are transliterations of English and French words), including fourteen words related to guns.

The main section listing vocabulary is preceded by an introduction to the Wolastoqey alphabet, and is followed by sample phrases and sentences, conjugations of a sample verb ("mu-sal'-te-wa'-kûn", to love), and a short sample narrative of a Wolastoqey legend, "How the Bear Gens [extended family] Began". The conjugation example lists 95 different usages of the verb "to love".
