= Bocabec, New Brunswick =

Bocabec
- Unincorporated community
- Location within New Brunswick
- Coordinates: 45°10′41″N 66°59′20″W
- Country: Canada
- Province: New Brunswick
- County: Charlotte County
- Parish: Saint Patrick Parish

Government
  - Type: Local service district
- Time zone: UTC-4 (AST)
  - Summer (DST): UTC-3 (ADT)
- Postal code: E5B
- Area code: 506
- Highways: Route 127

Bocabec is an unincorporated community in Saint Patrick Parish, Charlotte County, in southwestern New Brunswick, Canada. The community lies approximately 2.3 km (1.4 mi) southwest of Digdeguash and between Digdeguash and Chamcook.

== History ==
The name Bocabec derives from the Passamaquoddy name Pokabeskʼ, as identified by historian and geographer William Francis Ganong.

By 1866, Bocabec was a small farming community with approximately 86 families. At that time, it included Grove Settlement, which had four farming families. In the 1871 census period, the population of Bocabec was estimated at about 240 residents.

By 1898, the community had developed basic local services, including one post office, one store, and three churches, and had grown to a reported population of approximately 500. A post office operated in Bocabec from 1853 until 1918.

== See also ==
- List of communities in New Brunswick
