= Dipper Harbour, New Brunswick =

Coordinates: 45.095068°N 66.430209°W

Dipper Harbour is a community on Route 790 in Saint John County, New Brunswick, Canada.

Dipper Harbour is located on the Bay of Fundy, 5.24 kilometres (3.26 mi) east of Maces Bay: Musquash Parish, St. John County: named for a species of duck known as the bufflehead or dipper duck: PO 1855-1939. In 1866 Dipper Harbour was a fishing and farming community with about 23 resident families: in 1871 it had a post office, a church and a population of 200.

The Royal Navy vessel HMS Plumper was wrecked here in 1812, after capturing three small American privateer ships as part of the War of 1812.

The following are a list of public schools in the community:

School name	Start	End	School district	Year open	Max enrolment	2012 enrolment	Notes
Fundy Shores School	K	Fifth Grade (5)	Anglophone South				

== See also ==
- List of communities in New Brunswick
