= Reversing Falls Bridge =

Bridge in Saint John, Canada

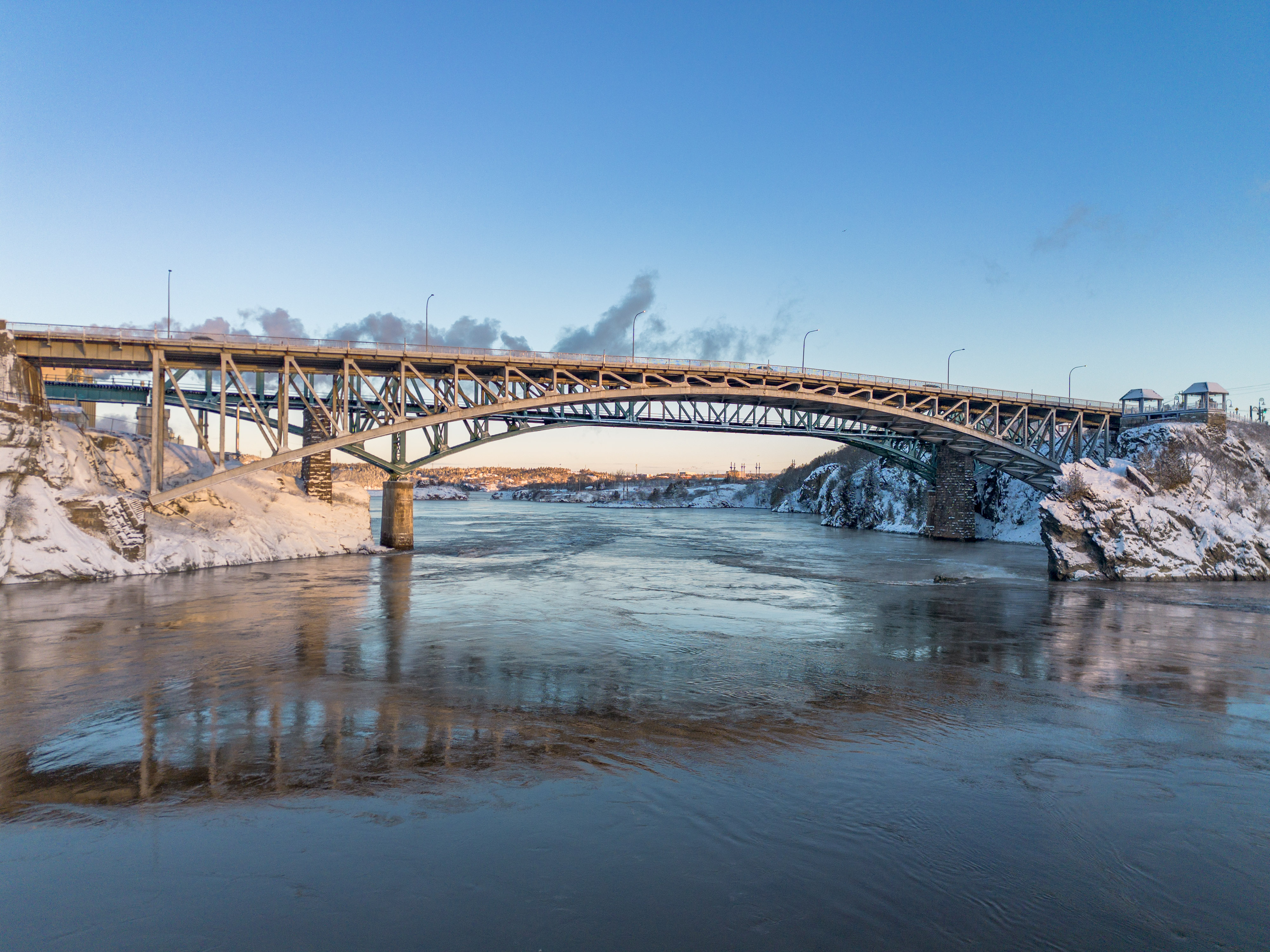
- Reversing Falls Bridge in 2026
- Coordinates: 45.2594°N 66.0868°W
- Carries: 2 lanes of Route 100, pedestrian sidewalk on both sides
- Crosses: Saint John River
- Locale: Saint John, New Brunswick, Canada
- Official name: Reversing Falls Bridge

Characteristics
- Total length: 190 metres (620 ft)

History
- Construction start: 1853

Location
- Interactive map of Reversing Falls Bridge

The Reversing Falls Bridge is a two-lane bridge crossing the Saint John River at Saint John, New Brunswick, Canada. It carries New Brunswick Route 100 (Bridge Road) across the river and there is no toll for its use.

== History ==
The Reversing Falls rapids are a notoriously dangerous stretch of water passing through a gorge which creates a chasm through the middle of the Saint John metropolitan region. Prior to construction of the first bridge in 1853, ferries were used to connect both sides of the river in the city.

The first bridge was a suspension bridge, built by Joseph Tomlinson, measured 190m in span. Its replacement, the current steel arch structure or Saint John Highway Arch Bridge (designed by Philip Louis Pratley), was opened to public use alongside the original in 1915. Both structures have shared the site of this crossing with the Reversing Falls Railway Bridge since 1885. It is also known as the floating bridge.

Until the 1940s, the Reversing Falls Bridge also carried a streetcar line.

Until 1968, with the opening of a second bridge in Saint John, the Harbour Bridge, the Reversing Falls Bridge was the only link between the city's East and West sides.

Visitors may stop at a public viewing point above the bridge on the west bank of the river, or use a restaurant and gift shop constructed adjacent to its western abutment.

=== Suicide issues ===
Reversing Falls Bridge has had issues with being a "suicide bridge", or a spot often used for suicide attempts, with the Saint John Police Force responding to an average of 20 incidents at the bridge annually between 2017 and 2022. The first known suicide attempt in which somebody survived occurred on June 29, 1914, when it was still a suspension bridge. In 2016, plans for a $500,000 suicide barrier were paused by Bill Fraser, the Transportation and Infrastructure Minister at the time. Both members of the public as well as the Saint John City Council have made calls to the province for the installation of a barrier in 2017, in 2019, and again in 2022. The city was set to install security cameras on the bridge in September 2022, but faced delays in January 2023.

== See also ==
- List of bridges in Canada
