= Black River, Saint John County =

Community in Saint John County, New Brunswick, Canada

Coordinates: 45.266389°N 65.785472°W

Location of Black River in New Brunswick

Black River is a small community just outside Saint John on Route 825 in the Canadian province of New Brunswick. There are 2 other communities in New Brunswick with the same name.

== See also ==
- List of communities in New Brunswick
