= New Brunswick Route 111 =

Highway in New Brunswick

Route 111

Route information
- Maintained by New Brunswick Department of Transportation
- Length: 91.7 km (57.0 mi)
- Existed: 1965–present

Major junctions
- West end: Route 1 in Rothesay
- Route 121 in Sussex Corner
- East end: Route 1 / Route 114 near Sussex Corner

Location
- Country: Canada
- Province: New Brunswick

Highway system
- Provincial highways in New Brunswick; Former routes
| ← Route 110 | → Route 112 |

Route 111 is a highway in New Brunswick, Canada; running from Route 1 exit 137 in Rothesay to Route 1 exit 198 in Sussex Corner, a distance of 91.7 kilometres.

== Route description ==
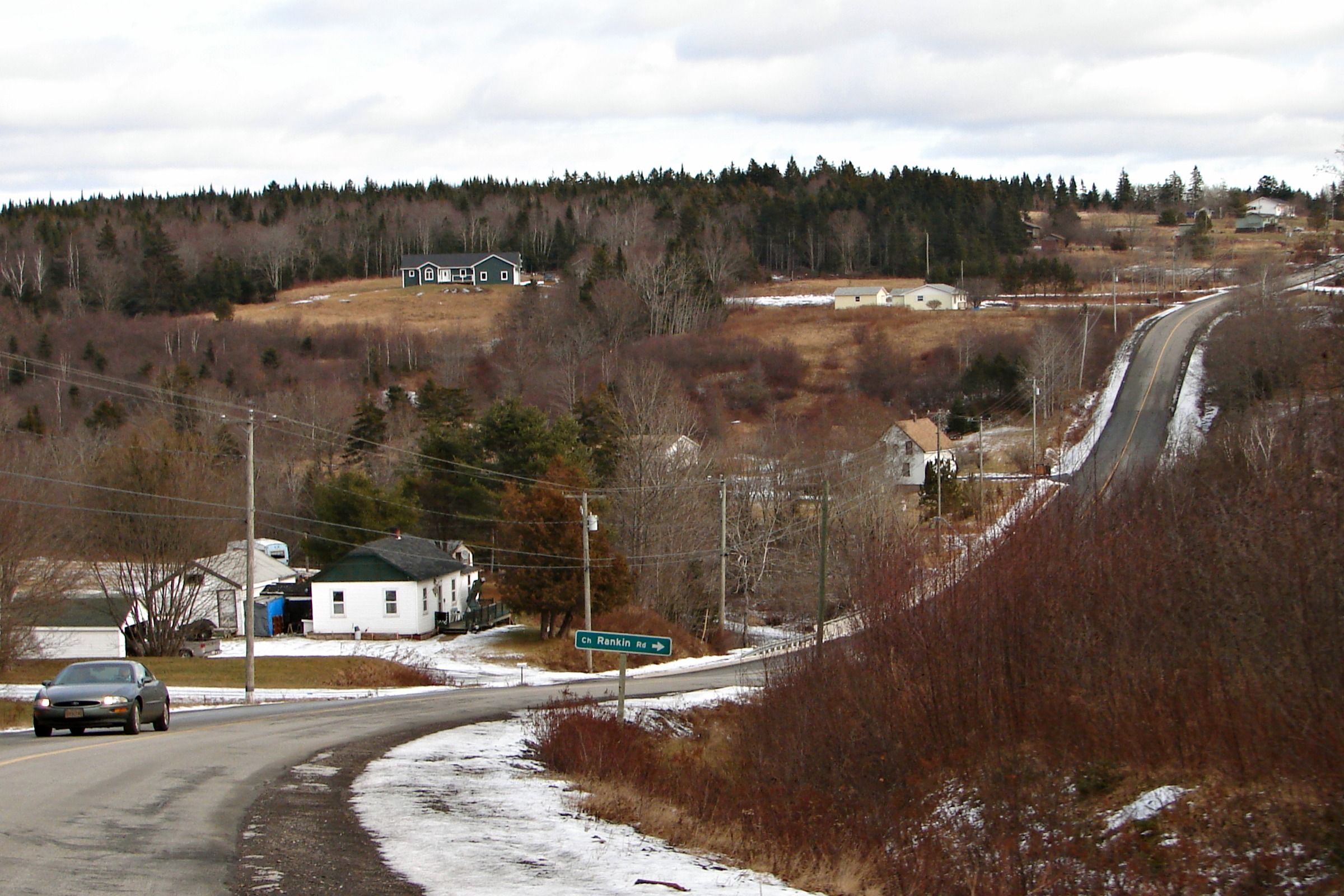
Route 111 in Fairfield

From Rothesay, Route 111 runs southeast along a Super two taking the name Airport Arterial Road to the Loch Lomond Road in Saint John, near the Saint John Airport. The route turns east along the Loch Lomond Road, changing its name briefly to St. Martins Road, leaving Saint John city limits, paralleling the Bay of Fundy coast to the village of Fundy-St. Martins. Route 111 turns north from Fundy-St. Martins through the communities of Upham, Hillsdale and Hammondvale, and uses the New Line Road to its end at Sussex Corner.

== History ==
Route 111 was first designated in 1965, following the routing of former Route 29. Until the construction of the Saint John Airport connector in 1991, Route 111 continued along the Loch Lomond Road into Saint John's city centre, and it has also been extended in Sussex Corner to reach the former Trans-Canada Highway, now part of Route 1.

== Major intersections ==
| County | Location | km | mi | Destinations | Notes |
|---|---|---|---|---|---|
| Kings | Rothesay | 0.0 | 0.0 | Route 1 (MacKay Highway) | Interchange, western terminus |
| Kings | | 2.2 | 1.4 | Route 860 (French Village Road) | interchange, eastbound exit and westbound entrance only |
| Kings | | 3.8 | 2.4 | Golden Grove Road | Interchange, eastbound entrance and westbound exit |
| Saint John | Loch Lomond | 11.6 | 7.2 | Route 820 north (Barnesville Road) | |
| Saint John | Loch Lomond | 12.0 | 7.5 | Route 825 east (Garnett Settlement Road) | |
| Saint John | | 27.4 | 17.0 | Route 825 west | |
| Kings | Upperton | 58.2 | 36.2 | Route 820 south | |
| Kings | Hillsdale | 65.1 | 40.5 | Route 865 north | |
| Kings | Sussex Corner | 87.8 | 54.6 | Route 121 west (Main Street) to Route 1 – Sussex | |
| Kings | | 91.7 | 57.0 | Route 1 / Route 114 – Moncton, Saint John, Fredericton | Interchange, eastern terminus, roadway continues as Route 114 |
1.000 mi = 1.609 km; 1.000 km = 0.621 mi: Incomplete access
