= New Brunswick Route 100 =

Highway in New Brunswick, Canada

Route 100

Route information
- Maintained by New Brunswick Department of Transportation
- Length: 48.58 km (30.19 mi)
- Existed: 1976–present

Major junctions
- West end: Route 1 in Lorneville
- Route 7 near Lorneville; Route 1 in Saint John; Route 119 in Quispamsis; Route 121 in Hampton
- East end: Route 1 in Hampton

Location
- Country: Canada
- Province: New Brunswick
- Major cities: Saint John, Rothesay, Quispamsis, Hampton

Highway system
- Provincial highways in New Brunswick; Former routes
← Route 95	→ Route 101

Route 100 is 49 kilometres long, and runs from Saint John to Hampton, New Brunswick.

Route 100 follows the through route across Saint John and the Kennebecasis Valley that was used prior to the construction of the Saint John Throughway and MacKay Highway. The road begins on Saint John's west side using Ocean West Way and Fairville Boulevard, and crosses the Reversing Falls Bridge to Chesley Drive on the north end. It then crosses a viaduct to the city centre, where it takes City Road to the east side, and leaves Saint John on Rothesay Avenue. Route 100 continues as the Hampton Highway through the Kennebecasis River Valley towns of Rothesay and Quispamsis, and uses a former alignment of Route 1 to reach Hampton.

== See also ==
- List of New Brunswick provincial highways
