= Gardner Creek, New Brunswick =

Coordinates: 45°15′39″N 65°44′26″W

Location of Gardner Creek in New Brunswick

Gardner Creek is a community in Saint John County, New Brunswick, Canada.

== See also ==
- List of communities in New Brunswick
