= Pocologan, New Brunswick =

Pocologan Maliseet papkeləkwan
- Unincorporated community
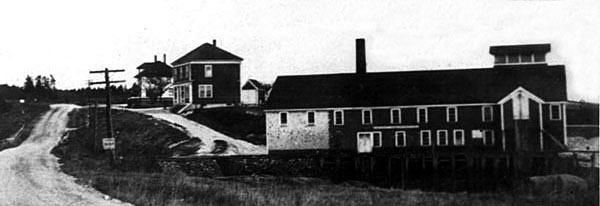
- Pocologan roadway, c. 1930

- Location within New Brunswick.
- Coordinates: 45°07′20″N 66°35′03″W
- Country: Canada
- Province: New Brunswick
- County: Charlotte
- Parish: Pennfield / Lepreau
- Electoral Districts Federal: New Brunswick Southwest
- Provincial: Charlotte-The Isles

Government
  - Type: Local service district
- Time zone: UTC-4 (AST)
  - Summer (DST): UTC-3 (ADT)
- Postal code(s): E5J
- Area code: 506

Pocologan is a rural community in Charlotte County, New Brunswick, Canada. Pocologan word origin is from Maliseet that means marshy area or bay and also resting place for canoes. The community is named after the nearby Pocologan River.

Located on the Bay of Fundy between Saint John and St. George, the community originally included New River Beach.

Clam harvesting and processing was an early industry however it was mostly non-existent by the 1980s due to over-harvesting.

== See also ==
- List of communities in New Brunswick
