= Prince of Wales, New Brunswick =

Prince of Wales
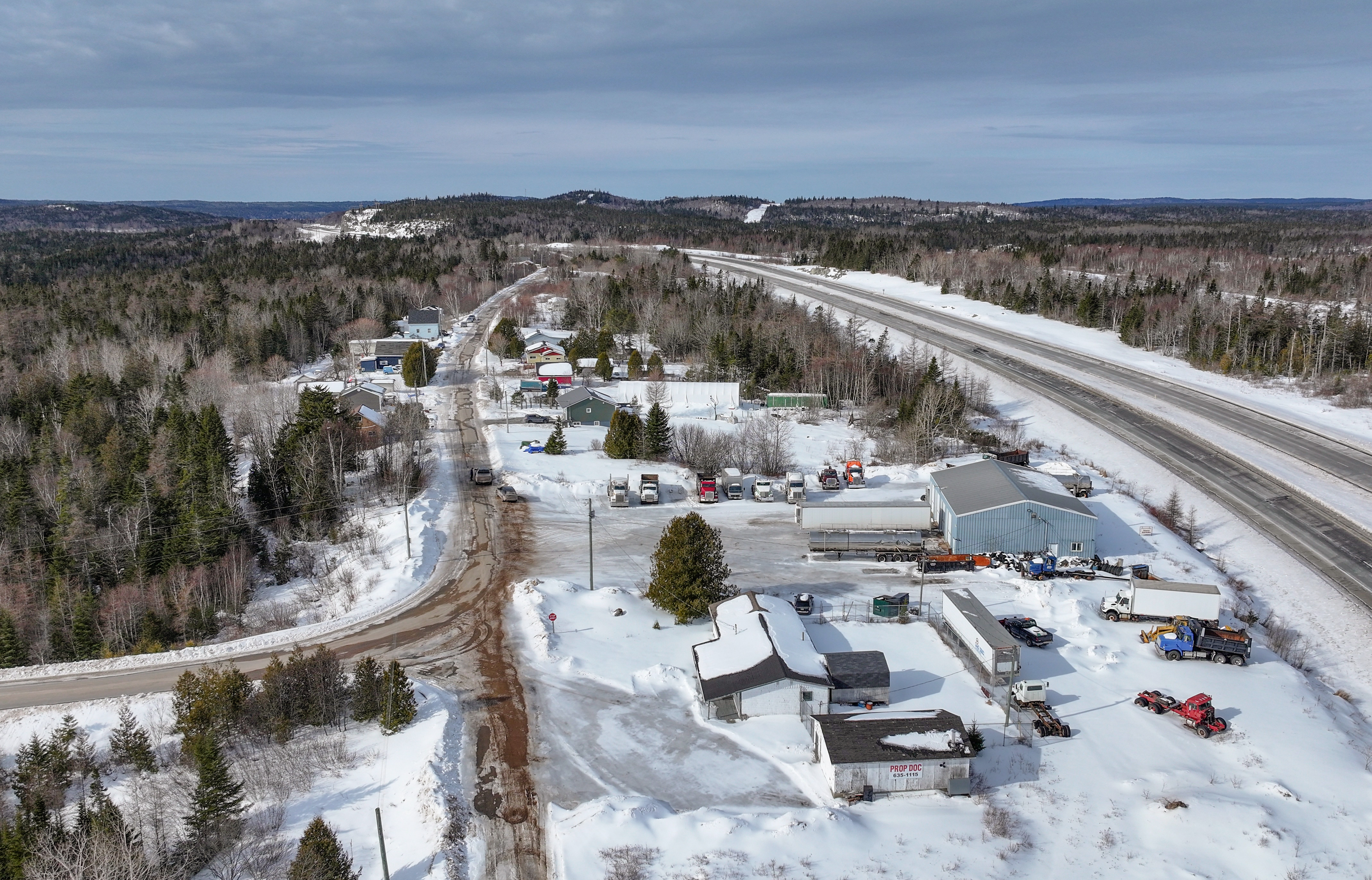
- Prince of Wales, New Brunswick (2025)

- Flag Seal
- Interactive map of Prince of Wales
- Coordinates: 45.2038°N 66.2788°W
- Country: Canada
- Province: New Brunswick
- County: Saint John County
- Settled: 1783
- Time zone: UTC-4 (AST)
  - Summer (DST): UTC-3 (ADT)

Prince of Wales is a Canadian rural community in Saint John County, New Brunswick. It is located just west of the city of Saint John.

== History ==
The community was settled in 1783 by Loyalist Lieutenant Colonel Gabriel DeVeber, who was a member of the Prince of Wales American Regiment (PoWAR). The PoWAR fought in the American Revolutionary War. The community was a farming and lumbering community in the 19th century. The Shore Line Railway, which has since been abandoned, ran through the community.

== See also ==
- List of communities in New Brunswick
