= Musquash, New Brunswick =

Musquash Head Lighthouse
- Location: Musquash Head, New Brunswick, Canada
- Coordinates: 45°08′37″N 66°14′14″W

Tower
- Constructed: 1959
- Foundation: concrete base
- Construction: concrete tower
- Automated: 1980s
- Height: 14.3 m (47 ft)
- Shape: octagonal tapered truncated tower with balcony and lantern
- Markings: white tower with a red horizontal band in the upper part, red lantern
- Power source: solar power
- Operator: Musquash Head Lightstation Inc.
- Fog signal: 4s. blast every 60s.

Light
- First lit: 1959
- Focal height: 35 m (115 ft)
- Range: 20 nmi (37 km; 23 mi)
- Characteristic: Fl W 3s
- Original lighthouse
- Constructed: 1879
- Foundation: concrete base
- Construction: wooden tower
- Shape: square truncated tower rising from keeper’s house
- Markings: white tower with a red horizontal band, red lantern
- Deactivated: 1959
- Focal height: 34 m (112 ft)

Musquash is a Canadian rural community in Saint John County, New Brunswick. It is located 5 km (3.1 mi) west southwest of the community of Prince of Wales in Musquash Parish.

== History ==
The Musquash Estuary was settled in the 1780s by Loyalist families who built dikes across the salt marshes to grow hay and build homes. Ensuing decades saw sawmills, cotton mills, guesthouses and an abbatoir. The Shore Line Railway was built through the community but has since been abandoned.

The community includes the locales of Ivanhoe, West Musquash and Clinch's Mills. A post office was located in Musquash from 1847 to 1969. It was largely a farming and lumbering community but is now largely an exurb of Saint John, thanks to being located on the Route 1 expressway.

== See also ==
- List of lighthouses in New Brunswick
- List of communities in New Brunswick
