= Lepreau, New Brunswick =

Coordinates: 45.167561°N 66.468297°W

Location of Lepreau in New Brunswick

Lepreau is a Canadian rural community in Charlotte County, New Brunswick.

Lepreau River and point. Of uncertain origin-probably a corruption of an earlier French designation, lapereau, "little rabbit", or le proe. Occurs as Pte. aux Napreaux (Franquelin, 1686).

== See also ==
- List of communities in New Brunswick
