= Maces Bay =

Community in New Brunswick, Canada

Coordinates: 45.099215°N 66.471062°W

Maces Bay is a community in the Canadian province of New Brunswick, located in Charlotte County.

== See also ==
- List of communities in New Brunswick
