= Pennfield Parish =

Coordinates: 45.21119°N 66.656113°W

Pennfield
- Parish
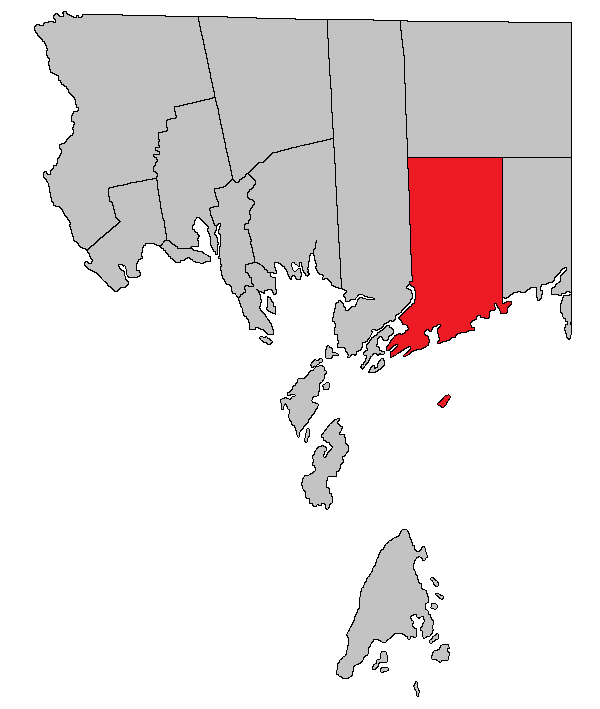
- Location within Charlotte County.
- Country: Canada
- Province: New Brunswick
- County: Charlotte County
- Erected: 1786

Area
  - Land: 363.75 km^{2} (140.44 sq mi)

Population (2021)
  - Total: 2,222
  - Density: 6.1/km^{2} (16/sq mi)
  - Change 2016-2021: ▲2.4%
  - Dwellings: 1,029
- Time zone: UTC-4 (AST)
  - Summer (DST): UTC-3 (ADT)
- Figures do not include portion within the village of Blacks Harbour

Pennfield is a geographic parish in Charlotte County, New Brunswick, Canada, (Note: The Territorial Division Act divides the province into 152 parishes, the cities of Saint John and Fredericton, and one town of Grand Falls. The Interpretation Act clarifies that parishes include any local government within their borders.) located west of Saint John located east of St. George and west of Saint John.

For governance purposes, Utopia and areas south of Route 780 are part of the incorporated rural community of Eastern Charlotte, while the sparsely populated north and The Wolves islands in the Bay of Fundy are part of the Southwest rural district, both of which are members of the Southwest New Brunswick Service Commission.

Prior to the 2023 governance reform, it comprised one village of Blacks Harbour and two local service districts, all of which were members of the Southwest New Brunswick Service Commission (SNBSC).

The Census subdivision of the same name includes all of the parish except the former village of Blacks Harbour.

== Origin of name ==
The parish was named by Quaker Loyalist settlers of the area for William Penn, early Quaker leader and founder of Pennsylvania.

== History ==
Pennfield was erected in 1786 as one of the county's original parishes; it included Lepreau Parish, the southern part of Clarendon Parish, and a small piece of Saint George Parish.

== Boundaries ==
Pennfield Parish is bounded:

- on the north by a line running true west from the southernmost corner of Queens County;
- on the east by a line running true north from the mouth of the Pocologan River;
- on the west by the prolongation north and south of the western line of grants straddling Lake Utopia, then south along a line running through the Letang River and Letang Harbour;
- on the south by the Bay of Fundy.
- also including any islands within 2 miles (3.2 km) of the shore and The Wolves, a group of islands more than 5 miles (8.0 km) offshore.

=== Evolution of boundaries ===
Pennfield's original northern boundary was a prolongation of the southern line of the Cape Association grant in Saint David Parish, which runs south of Robinson Creek Road in Saint David Ridge. The prolongation passes near the northern end of Loon Lake in Clarendon Parish before striking the Queens County line. A small part of Saint George Parish near the head of the Letang River was also part of Pennfield; all islands in the river and Letang Harbour were part of Saint George.

In 1814 the parish was extended north (Note: Because Pennfield's northern line was based on Saint George's, Pennfield probably expanded when Saint George did. This has been the norm in New Brunswick since the first boundary changes in 1787. If Pennfield was an exception, then the boundary was moved north in 1850.) to the county line, adding the rest of Clarendon.

In 1850 the boundary with Saint George Parish near the head of the Letang River was changed to its modern line.

In 1857 the eastern part of Pennfield was erected as LePreau Parish.

In 1868 all of the parish north of the most southern point of Queens County was included in the Clarendon District, a polling district that also included the northern part of Lepreau Parish.

In 1869 the northern part of Pennfield was included in the newly erected Clarendon Parish.

In 1877 the boundary through the Letang River and Letang Harbour was changed, transferring some islands to Pennfield.

== Former governance units ==
=== Municipality ===
The village of Blacks Harbour sat at the southwestern corner of the parish's mainland.

=== Local service districts ===
Both LSDs assessed for the basic LSD services of fire protection, police services, land use planning, emergency measures, and dog control.

=== Pennfield Parish ===
The local service district of the parish of Pennfield originally included all of the parish outside Blacks Harbour.

The LSD was established in 1970 to assess for fire protection. First aid and ambulance services were added in 1979.

In 2022, the LSD additionally assessed for community & recreation services. The taxing authority was 512.00 Pennfield.

=== Beaver Harbour ===
Beaver Harbour comprised an area on the western side of Beaver Harbour, including the eastern part of the old town plat and running north to the junction of Mountain Road and Waite's Lane. The community of Beaver Harbour outgrew the boundaries of the LSD by 2013.

The LSD was established in 1971 to add street lighting and community services. First aid and ambulance services were added in 1979.

Beaver Harbour additionally assessed street lighting and community & recreation services. The taxing authority was 524.00 Beaver Harbour.

Beaver Harbour was the only LSD in Charlotte County with street lighting.

== Communities ==
Communities at least partly within the parish. bold indicates an incorporated municipality

- Beaver Harbour
- **Blacks Harbour**
  - Tunaville
- Crow Harbour
- Deadmans Harbour
- Justasons Corner
- Pennfield
- Pennfield Corner
- Pennfield Ridge
- Pennfield Station
- Seeleys Cove
- Utopia
- Utopia Centre
- Wallace Cove
- Woodland

== Bodies of water ==
Bodies of water (Note: Not including brooks, ponds or coves.) at least partly within the parish. italics indicate a name no longer in official use

- Letang River (L'Etang River)
- Little New River
- Little Pocologan River
- New River
- Pocologan River
- Cripps Stream
- Red Rock Stream
- Trout Lake Stream
- Buckmans Creek
- Crow Creek
- Wards Creek
- Beaver Harbour
- Blacks Harbour
- Crow Harbour
- Deadmans Harbour
- Letang Harbour (L'Etang Harbour)
- Red Head Harbour
- Seeleys Basin
- Eastern Chops
- The Basin
- more than fifty other officially named lakes

== Islands ==
Islands at least partly within the parish. italics indicates a name no longer in official use

- Cochranes Island
- Moose Island
- Munson Island
- Peat Island
- Penn Island
- Tub Island
- Wolf Islands

== Other notable places ==
Parks, historic sites, and other noteworthy places at least partly within the parish.

- Lepreau River Wildlife Management Area
- New River Protected Natural Area
- Pocologan Protected Natural Area
- Utopia Wildlife Refuge

== Demographics ==
=== Population ===
Canada census – Pennfield community profile

	2021	2016	2011
Population	2,222 (+2.4% from 2016)	2,170 (-2.2% from 2011)	2,218 (-4.5% from 2006)
Land area	363.75 km^{2} (140.44 sq mi)	363.86 km^{2} (140.49 sq mi)	363.88 km^{2} (140.49 sq mi)
Population density	6.1/km^{2} (16/sq mi)	6.0/km^{2} (16/sq mi)	6.1/km^{2} (16/sq mi)
Median age	48.8 (M: 48.8, F: 48.8)	46.7 (M: 46.5, F: 47.0)	44.3 (M: 44.1, F: 44.4)
Private dwellings	945 (total)	996 (total)	1,099 (total)
Median household income		$60,992	$58,972

References: 2021 2016 2011

Historical Census Data - Pennfield Parish, New Brunswick

Year	Pop.	±%
1991	2,211	—
1996	2,275	+2.9%

Year	Pop.	±%
2001	2,417	+6.2%
2006	2,322	−3.9%

Year	Pop.	±%
2011	2,218	−4.5%
2016	2,170	−2.2%

=== Language ===
Canada Census Mother Tongue - Pennfield Parish, New Brunswick
Census	Total	English			French			English & French			Other		
Year	Responses	Count	Trend	Pop %	Count	Trend	Pop %	Count	Trend	Pop %	Count	Trend	Pop %
2011	2,195	2,045	▼7.3%	93.17%	90	▲38.9%	4.10%	5	▲ n/a%	0.23%	55	▲18.2%	2.50%
2006	2,305	2,205	▼2.6%	95.66%	55	▼52.2%	2.39%	0	▼100.0%	0.00%	45	▲55.6%	1.95%
2001	2,410	2,265	▲5.3%	93.98%	115	▲39.1%	4.77%	10	▲ n/a%	0.42%	20	▼20.0%	0.83%
1996	2,240	2,145	n/a	95.76%	70	n/a	3.12%	0	n/a	0.00%	25	n/a	1.12%

== Access Routes ==
Highways and numbered routes that run through the parish, including external routes that start or finish at the parish limits:

- **Highways**
  - Route 1
- **Principal Routes**
  - Route 176
- Secondary Routes:
  - Route 778
  - Route 780
  - Route 785
  - Route 795
- External Routes:
  - None

== See also ==
- List of parishes in New Brunswick
