= Mascareen Peninsula =

Coordinates: 45°05′N 66°52′W

The Mascareen Peninsula (pronounced: (mas-kuh-REEN)) is located in Saint George Parish, Charlotte County, in southwestern New Brunswick, Canada. It is situated on the eastern side of Passamaquoddy Bay, opposite St. Andrews. The peninsula is 8 miles (13 km) in length and 5 miles (8.0 km) in width. The villages of L'Etete, L'Etang, and Back Bay are located on the Mascareen Peninsula.
