= MV Grand Manan Adventure =

Canadian ferry

- Grand Manan Adventure arriving at Blacks Harbour, New Brunswick

History
- Name: Grand Manan Adventure
- Owner: Government of New Brunswick
- Operator: Coastal Transport Limited
- Port of registry: (Canada) Grand Manan
- Route: Blacks Harbour–North Head
- Ordered: March 2009
- Builder: Eastern Shipbuilding, Panama City, Florida
- Launched: January 2011
- Completed: 2011
- In service: 11 August 2011–present
- Identification: IMO number: 9558103; Canadian official number: 835549

General characteristics
- Type: Roll-on/roll-off ferry
- Tonnage: 6,580 GT
- Length: 85.5 m (280 ft 6 in) overall
- Beam: 18.5 m (60 ft 8 in)
- Draught: 4.52 m (14 ft 10 in) (design)
- Installed power: 2 diesel engines; 4,474 kW (6,000 hp) total
- Propulsion: Twin screws
- Speed: 14 knots (26 km/h; 16 mph)
- Capacity: 360 passengers; 82 cars

MV Grand Manan Adventure is a Canadian roll-on/roll-off ferry operating year-round between Blacks Harbour and North Head on Grand Manan, New Brunswick. It is owned by the Government of New Brunswick and operated by Coastal Transport Limited. The crossing of the Bay of Fundy takes approximately 90 minutes. Built in Florida in 2011, the vessel took over the year-round service from Grand Manan V, which became the seasonal ferry.

== Construction ==
Grand Manan Adventure was constructed by Eastern Shipbuilding in Panama City, Florida. The province awarded the US$65 million contract in March 2009 to replace the 1965-built Grand Manan and increase capacity on the route. The vessel was launched in January 2011 and delivered in July.

The ship measures 85.5 m (280 ft 6 in) in overall length, with a beam of 18.5 m (60 ft 8 in) and a design draught of 4.52 m (14 ft 10 in). It is a single-ended ferry with four vehicle lanes, powered by two EMD 12-cylinder diesel engines. Passenger facilities include a dining area, a quiet lounge and a kennel.

== Service history ==
Grand Manan Adventure entered service on 11 August 2011. Its introduction allowed Grand Manan V to move to summer service and the older Grand Manan to be retired.

A bow thruster failure led to dry-docking in Halifax in 2011. Further engine failures between 2013 and 2015 were examined in an independent technical review carried out by the Government of Newfoundland and Labrador at New Brunswick's request.

In June 2025, a mechanical failure interrupted the island's ferry service while Grand Manan V was in dry dock. Grand Manan Adventure resumed crossings on one engine, with daily round trips temporarily reduced from four to three.
