= Pennfield =

Pennfield may refer to:

- Pennfield Parish, New Brunswick, a civil parish west of Saint John, Canada
  - the parish of Pennfield, a local service district covering most of the civil parish
  - Pennfield, New Brunswick, an unincorporated community in the civil parish
- Pennfield Charter Township, Michigan, United States
