= McGraws Island =

Island in New Brunswick, Canada

- Interactive map of McGraws Island

Geography
- Location: Bay of Fundy
- Coordinates: 45°3′23″N 66°54′28″W

Administration
- Canada
- Province: New Brunswick
- County: Charlotte
- Parish: Saint George Parish

McGraws Island (formerly Mathew Island) is an undeveloped island in the Saint George Parish of Charlotte County, New Brunswick, Canada in the Bay of Fundy.

In 1875, a fishing weir was licensed off the island to Andrew and James McLean.

The power lines from the mainland run through McGraws to Hoyt Island to Macs Island to Pendleton Island before reaching Deer Island, New Brunswick.
