= Eastern Charlotte =

- Rural community
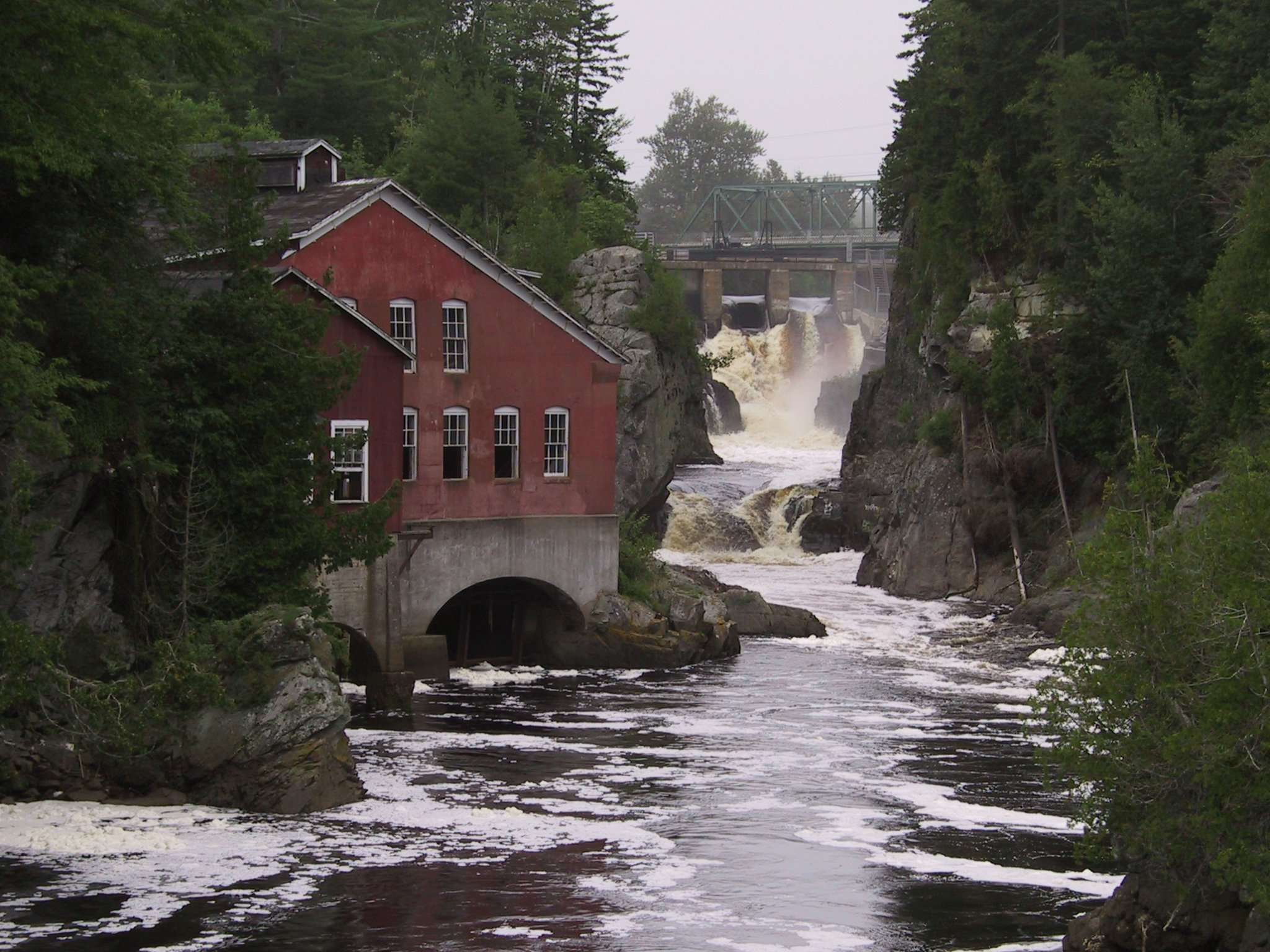
- Magaguadavic River gorge and the St. George Power hydro plant

- Location within New Brunswick
- Coordinates: 45°08′N 66°49′W
- Country: Canada
- Province: New Brunswick
- County: Charlotte
- Regional service commission: Southwest
- Incorporated: January 1, 2023

Government
  - Type: Rural community council
  - Mayor: John D. Craig
- Time zone: UTC-4 (AST)
  - Summer (DST): UTC-3 (ADT)
- Postal code(s): E5C, E5H
- Area code: 506
- Highways Route 1 Route 172 Route 176: Route 760; Route 770; Route 778

Eastern Charlotte is a rural community in the Canadian province of New Brunswick. It was formed through the 2023 New Brunswick local governance reforms.

== History ==
Eastern Charlotte was incorporated on January 1, 2023 via the amalgamation of the former town of St. George and the former village of Blacks Harbour as well as the concurrent annexation of adjacent unincorporated areas.

== Geography ==
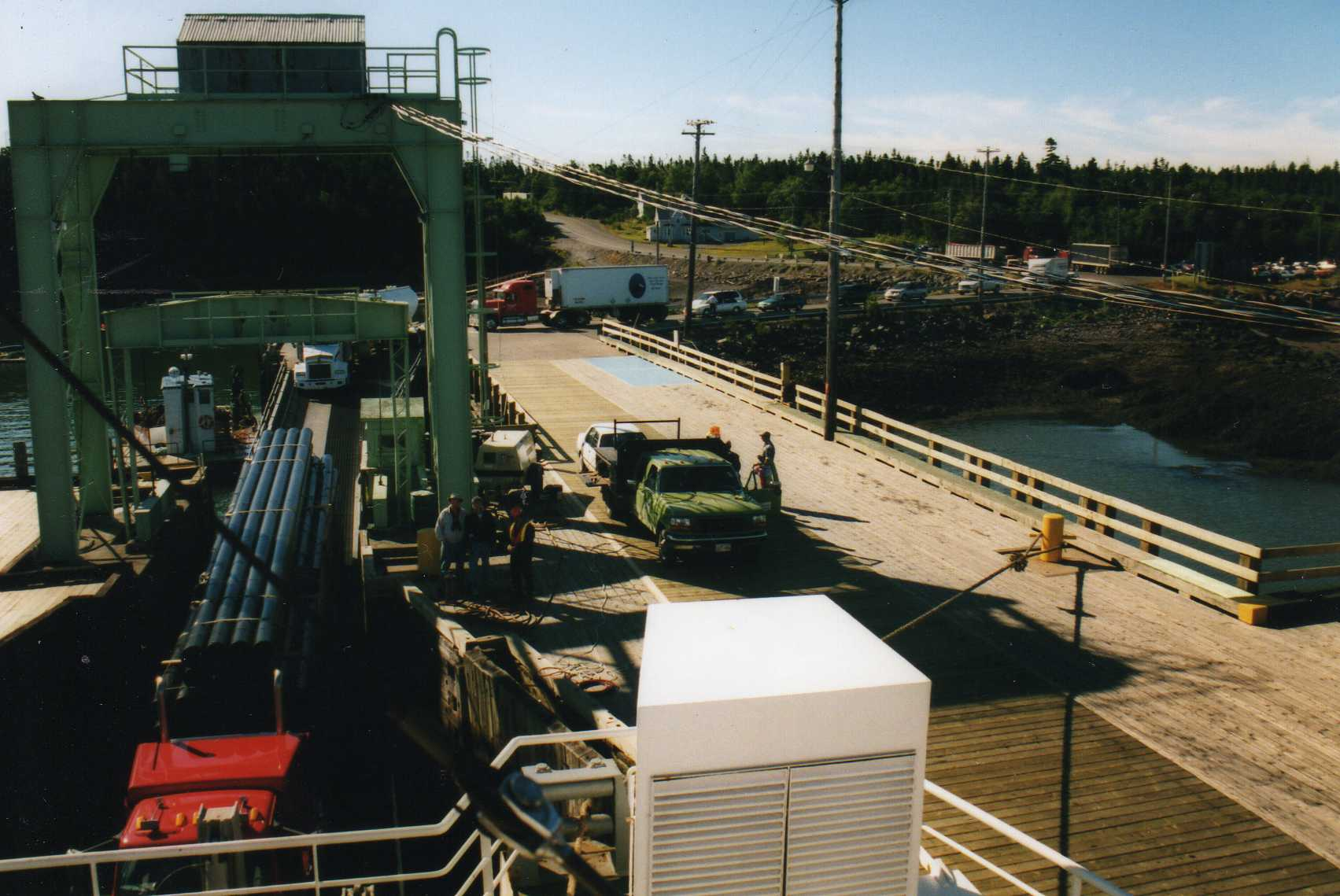
Vehicles boarding the ferry in Eastern Charlotte to Grand Manan Island (2002)

Eastern Charlotte is the northern terminus for the year-round Eastern Charlotte to Grand Manan Island Ferry operated by Coastal Transport

Fishing has been a vital part of its existence for over 200 years. Connors Brothers Limited was founded in 1885 at Blacks Harbour, now a major international processor of all types of seafood. The company is also a major New Brunswick employer.

== See also ==
- List of communities in New Brunswick
- List of municipalities in New Brunswick
