= Bioriginal =

Canadian manufacturing company

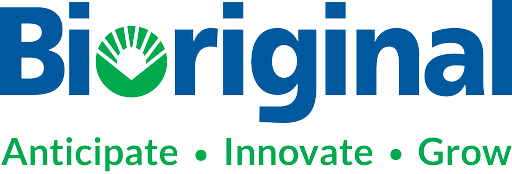
- Type: Subsidiary
- Industry: Manufacturing
- Founded: 1993; 33 years ago
- Founder: Rick Kulow
- Headquarters: Saskatoon, Saskatchewan, Canada
- Area served: Worldwide
- Key people: Randy Fournier (CEO)
- Parent: Cooke Inc.
- Subsidiaries: The Factory; Cana Corporation
- Website: bioriginal.com

Bioriginal, also known as the Bioriginal Food & Science Corp, is a Canadian food and nutraceutical manufacturing company based in Saskatoon, Saskatchewan. Founded in 1993, it is a subsidiary company of Cooke Inc., based in New Brunswick. Bioriginal supplies fatty acids globally, and produces nutritional supplement oils.

== History ==
Bioriginal Food & Science Corp. was established in 1993, the result from two companies being merged. It was founded by Rick Kulow and operations began in Saskatoon, Saskatchewan. In 2000, Bioriginal began operations in Europe through a Netherlands-based office. In 2003, the company received the ABEX Business of the Year award. On 8 September 2014, Bioriginal was fully acquired by Omega Protein for US$70.5 million. That same year, the company received the STEP Exporter of the Year Award. Bioriginal later became a subsidiary company of Cooke Inc., after they acquired Omega Protein in 2017.

In September 2023, Bioriginal acquired Bodegraven, Netherlands-based company The Factory as well as Cana Corporation, an Asian Pacific distribution company based in Yokohama, Japan.
