= MacDougalls Island =

Island in New Brunswick, Canada

- Interactive map of MacDougalls Island

Geography
- Location: Bay of Fundy
- Coordinates: 45.1342°N 66.9204°W
- Highest elevation: 45 m (148 ft)

Administration
- Canada
- Province: New Brunswick
- County: Charlotte
- Parish: Saint George Parish

MacDougalls Island (formerly Basaltic Island) is a tidal island in the Saint George Parish of Charlotte County, New Brunswick, Canada in the Bay of Fundy.

It is noted to have purple fluorite, as well as pyrite, sphalerite, galena, malachite and chalcopyrite.

In September 1997, the island was used for dye dispersion trials in Passamaquoddy Bay, seeking to trace the route of sea louse pesticides.
