= Peat Island (New Brunswick) =

Island in New Brunswick, Canada

- Interactive map of Peat Island

Geography
- Location: Bay of Fundy
- Coordinates: 45.0782°N 66.7788°W

Administration
- Canada
- Province: New Brunswick
- County: Charlotte
- Parish: Saint George Parish

Peat Island is an undeveloped island in the Saint George Parish of Charlotte County, New Brunswick, Canada in the Bay of Fundy.

The bogs of Charlotte County, running between Musquash and L'etang Harbour, contain sphagnum peat bogs which are distinctive to this small area of the New Brunswick shores.
