= Howards Island (New Brunswick) =

Island in New Brunswick, Canada

- Interactive map of Howards Island

Geography
- Location: Bay of Fundy
- Coordinates: 45°2′23″N 66°49′59″W

Administration
- Canada
- Province: New Brunswick
- County: Charlotte
- Parish: Saint George Parish

Howards Island (formerly Fox Island, not to be confused with the current, smaller, Fox Island one kilometre away north of Flea Island) is an island in the Saint George Parish of Charlotte County, New Brunswick, Canada in the Bay of Fundy.
