= Caithness (disambiguation) =

Caithness may refer to:

- Caithness (county of Scotland)
- Caithness (local government district, Highland region)
- Caithness (UK Parliament constituency)
- Caithness, New Brunswick, Canada, a community
- Earl of Caithness, a title in the Peerage of Scotland created four times, the first three being extinct
- Kate Caithness, Scottish curler
- Wilfrid Caithness (1883–1954), British actor
- Caithness Energy, a privately held, independent power producer in the United States
  - Caithness Long Island Energy Center, Yaphank, New York, a power plant operated by the company
- Caithness RFC, a rugby union club from Thurso, Scotland
- Caithness Shinty Club, a defunct shinty team from Caithness, Scotland

== See also ==
- Caithness Flagstone Group, a Devonian lithostratigraphic group (a sequence of rock strata) in northern Scotland
