= Cooke Inc. =

Canadian seafood company

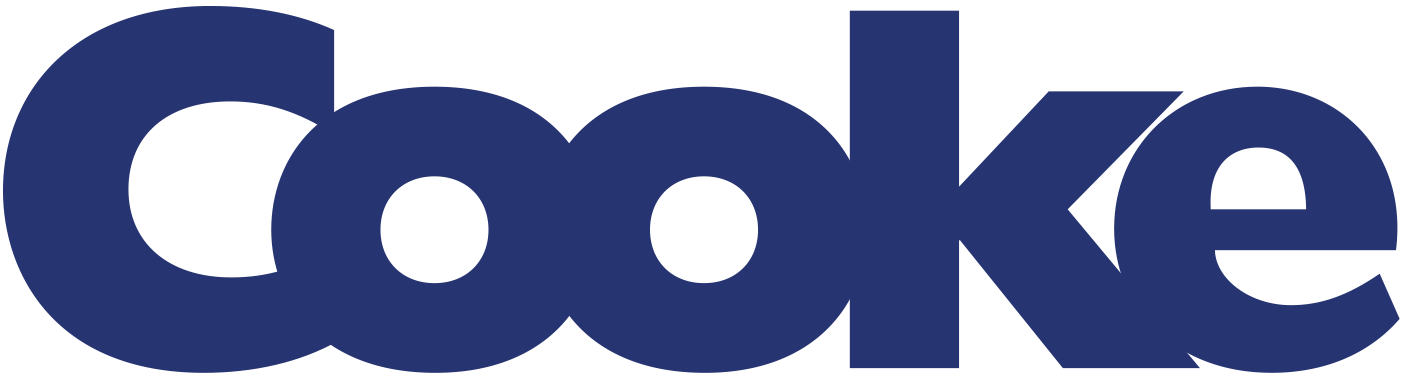
- Type: Private company
- Industry: Aquaculture
- Founded: 1985; 41 years ago in Blacks Harbour, New Brunswick, Canada
- Founders: Gifford Cooke; Glenn Cooke; Michael Cooke
- Headquarters: Saint John, New Brunswick, Canada
- Key people: Glenn Cooke (CEO)
- Products: Seafood
- Revenue: ▲CA$4 billion (annually)
- Number of employees: nearly 13,000 (2023)
- Divisions: Cooke Aquaculture Inc.
- Subsidiaries: Tassal; Omega Protein; Icicle Seafoods; Bioriginal
- Website: cookeseafood.com

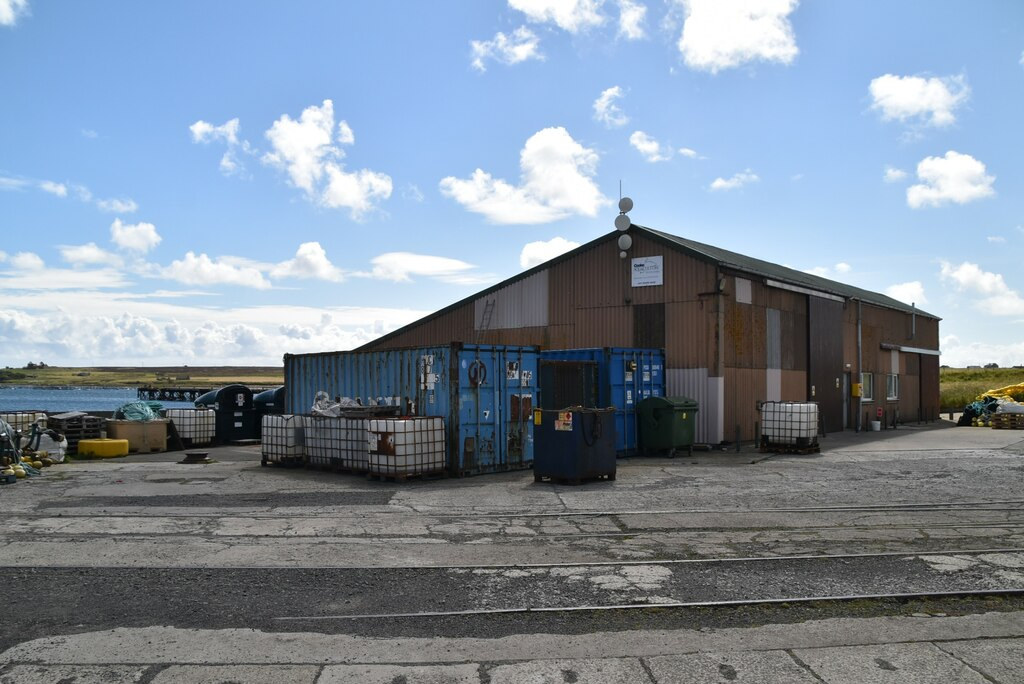
Building of the Cooke Aquaculture subsidiary in Scotland

Cooke Inc. (also known as Cooke Seafood or Cooke Aquaculture) is a Canadian multinational seafood company based in New Brunswick, with headquarters in Saint John. Founded in 1985 as a family-ran salmon farm in Blacks Harbour, Cooke is the largest privately held seafood company globally. The family-run company operates several vessels and processing facilities under multiple divisions, subsidiaries, and brand names internationally. Outside of its origin business in New Brunswick, the company has run salmon aquaculture operations in Maine and Washington of the U.S. division and Chile (Cooke Chile) of the South American division, and Scotland of the European division.

Since its formation, Cooke Inc. has made approximately 100 acquisitions, 14 of which, since 2016, were major acquisitions worth $2.5 billion. As of 2023, Cooke employs nearly 13,000 people, including 2,500 in Atlantic Canada. The company operates in 14 countries and utilizes 800 vessels along with 30 processing plants, while using their own hatcheries and feed plants. Cooke currently makes annual revenues of CA$4 billion. Companies acquired by Cooke include Icicle Seafoods (2016), Omega Protein (2017), and Tassal (2022).

== History ==
Cooke Inc. was established in Blacks Harbour, New Brunswick, Canada in 1985 by Gifford Cooke and his two sons Glenn and Michael. The company started with 5,000 farmed salmon in a pen.

In 2015, Cooke expanded its operations in the United States by establishing Cooke Seafood USA Inc. and acquiring the Wanchese Fish Company. In late 2016, Cooke relocated their headquarters to uptown Saint John, New Brunswick. The company has a history with the city, which is where Glenn Cooke, the co-founder and CEO, lives and serves as one of the board of directors for the Saint John Port Authority. They additionally acquired Uruguayan company Fripur S.A. and its Argentina-based subsidiary Grinfin, which they used to establish Cooke Uruguay. On December 19, 2017, Cooke fully acquired American fish operations company Omega Protein for a total of CA$650 million, or US$22/share. In February 2019, Cooke acquired Latin American shrimp farming company Seajoy Seafood Corporation.

In June 2022, Cooke expanded its office space into the Brunswick Square office tower. In November 2022, Cooke made its largest acquisition, purchasing Australian salmon aquaculture company Tassal for $1.5 billion.

On March 3, 2024, Cooke co-founder Gifford Cooke died at the age of 85. His death was announced by Cooke the following day. Later that month, Cooke was named one of the top employers for Atlantic Canada in 2024.

In April 2024, a 2021 False Claims Act lawsuit was unsealed in New York, accusing Cooke of illegally creating a U.S. shell company to cover up its Canadian ownership. On November 14, 2024, the Conservation Law Foundation filed a lawsuit notice to Cooke under the Clean Water Act, alleging the company of "discharging effluent from its salmon pens in the Gulf of Maine and affecting other water uses, including fishing and lobstering". Cooke released a statement on the same day, denying the allegations.
