= Cooks Island =

Island in New Brunswick, Canada

- Interactive map of Cooks Island

Geography
- Location: Bay of Fundy
- Coordinates: 45°3′12″N 66°54′4″W

Administration
- Canada
- Province: New Brunswick
- County: Charlotte
- Parish: Saint George Parish

Cooks Island (formerly Oak Island) is an undeveloped island in the Saint George Parish of Charlotte County, New Brunswick, Canada in the Bay of Fundy.
