= Letang =

Letang may refer to:

== Geography ==
- Letang Municipality, Province No. 1, Nepal
- Letang, New Brunswick, Canada

== People ==
- Alan Letang, OHL coach and former NHL player
- Doreen Ann Letang, plaintiff of the British case Letang v Cooper
- Kris Letang, Canadian NHL player
- Petra Letang, British actress
