= Jail Island =

Island in New Brunswick, Canada

- Interactive map of Jail Island

Geography
- Location: Bay of Fundy
- Coordinates: 45°3′39″N 66°49′41″W

Administration
- Canada
- Province: New Brunswick
- County: Charlotte
- Parish: Saint George Parish

Jail Island is an undeveloped island in the Saint George Parish of Charlotte County, New Brunswick, Canada in the Bay of Fundy. It is used in navigation to enter the eastern side of Letang Harbour.

It was named for the habit of skippers to leave drunken crew members on the island to sober up.

It was the basis of Skip Wolf's aquaculture "Jail Island Salmon Ltd" leases in the Lime Kiln Bay area in the 1980s, before he sold and built Wolfhead Smokers in 1998.

The island appears on the cover of John M. Anderson's 2007 "The Salmon Connection: Development of Atlantic Salmon Aquaculture in Canada".

In September 1874, the schooner Martha A., owned by Captain Glass and his investors, struck Jail Island and broke in two, losing its cargo of coal while trying to anchor in the harbour.
