= Tub Island (New Brunswick) =

Island in New Brunswick, Canada

- Interactive map of Tub Island

Geography
- Location: Bay of Fundy
- Coordinates: 45°3′16″N 66°54′42″W

Administration
- Canada
- Province: New Brunswick
- County: Charlotte
- Parish: Saint George Parish

Tub Island is an undeveloped island in the Saint George Parish of Charlotte County, New Brunswick, Canada in the Bay of Fundy.

There is a fishing weir licensed off the island's shore.
