= Green's Point Lighthouse =

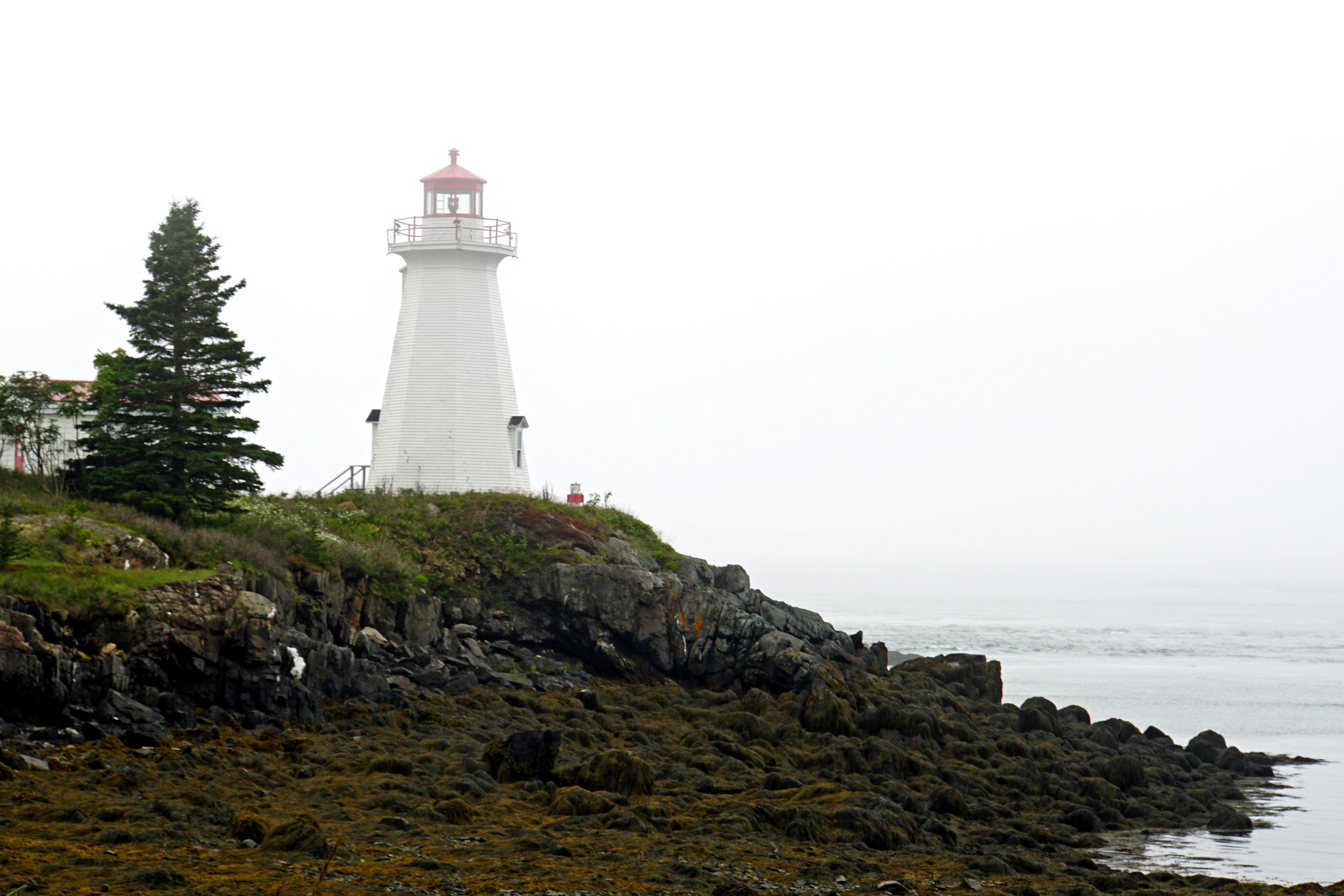
- Location: L'etete; Charlotte County; New Brunswick; Canada
- Coordinates: 45°02′20″N 66°53′30″W

Tower
- Constructed: 1879
- Construction: wooden tower
- Shape: octagonal tower with balcony and lantern
- Markings: white tower and gallery, red lantern and trim
- Operator: Green's Point Light Association

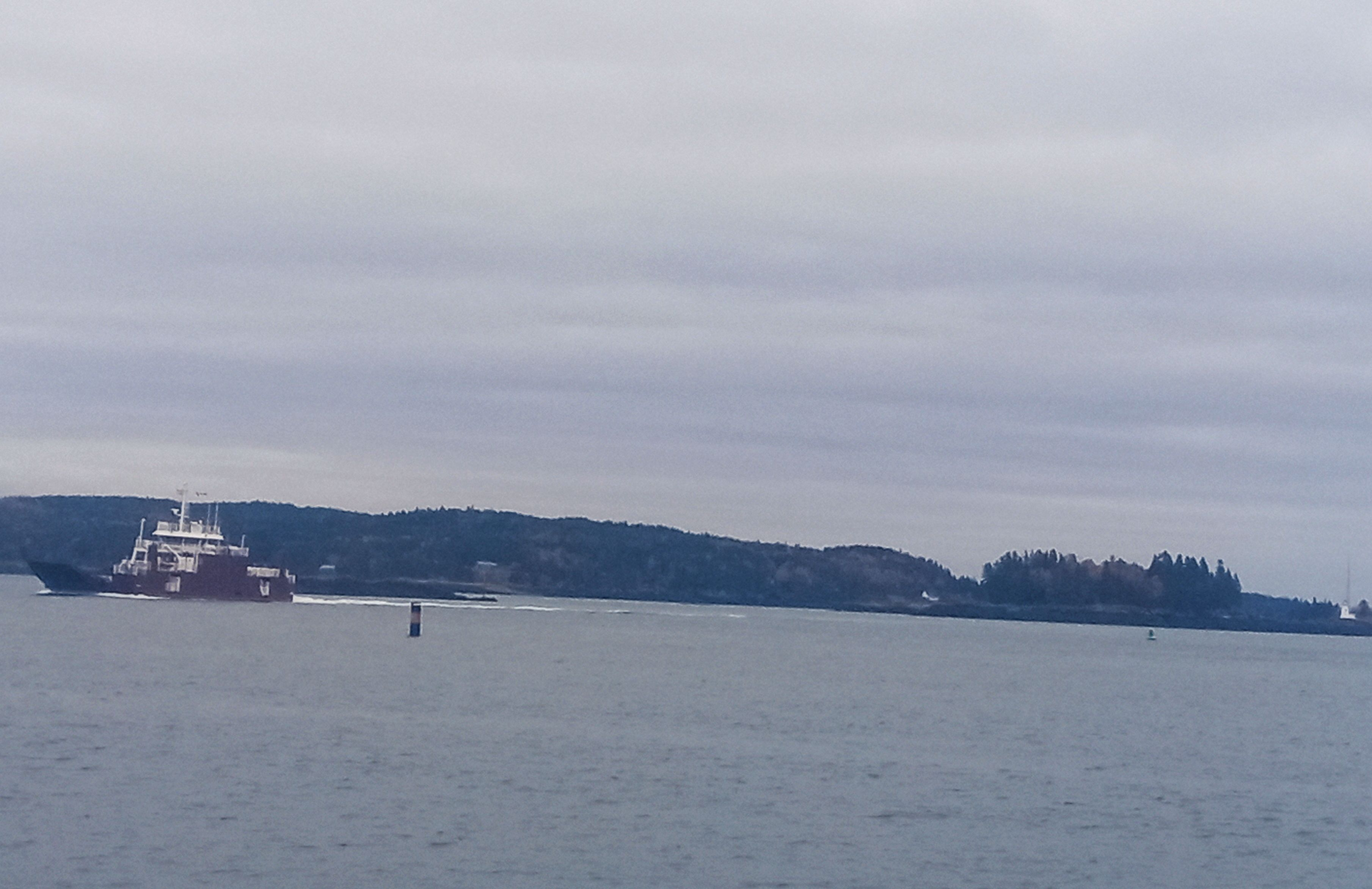
The Abnaki car ferry passing Macs Island with Green's Point Lighthouse visible on the far-right.

Green's Point Lighthouse (previously termed Mascabin Point Lighthouse and or L'etete Passage Light) is situated in L'etete on the Atlantic coast at the opening to Back Bay, New Brunswick, Canada.

Established in 1879, and altered in 1903, the lighthouse was automated in 1996 and ownership was transferred to Green's Point Light Station in 2008. It has an interpretative centre, and rents out the attached cottage to tourists to finance the upkeep of the historic site. Thousands of tourists visit the lighthouse annually. The lighthouse property has a museum, aquarium and salmon aquaculture site. The Canadian Coast Guard maintains a helipad station at Green's Point for search and rescue, as well as servicing lights, foghorns and Channel 14 VHF.

In the summer of 1986, benthic algae research stations were set up across the region including at Green's Point.

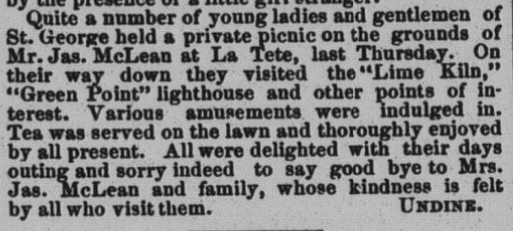
An 1891 visit to the lighthouse

It is a popular site for high school and university studies. In 2023, the Huntsman Marine Science Centre released the Dive Deeper website with detailed 3D and panoramic views diving around the Passamaquoddy Bay, including Green's Point.
