= Pennfield, New Brunswick =

Pennfield
- Neighbourhood
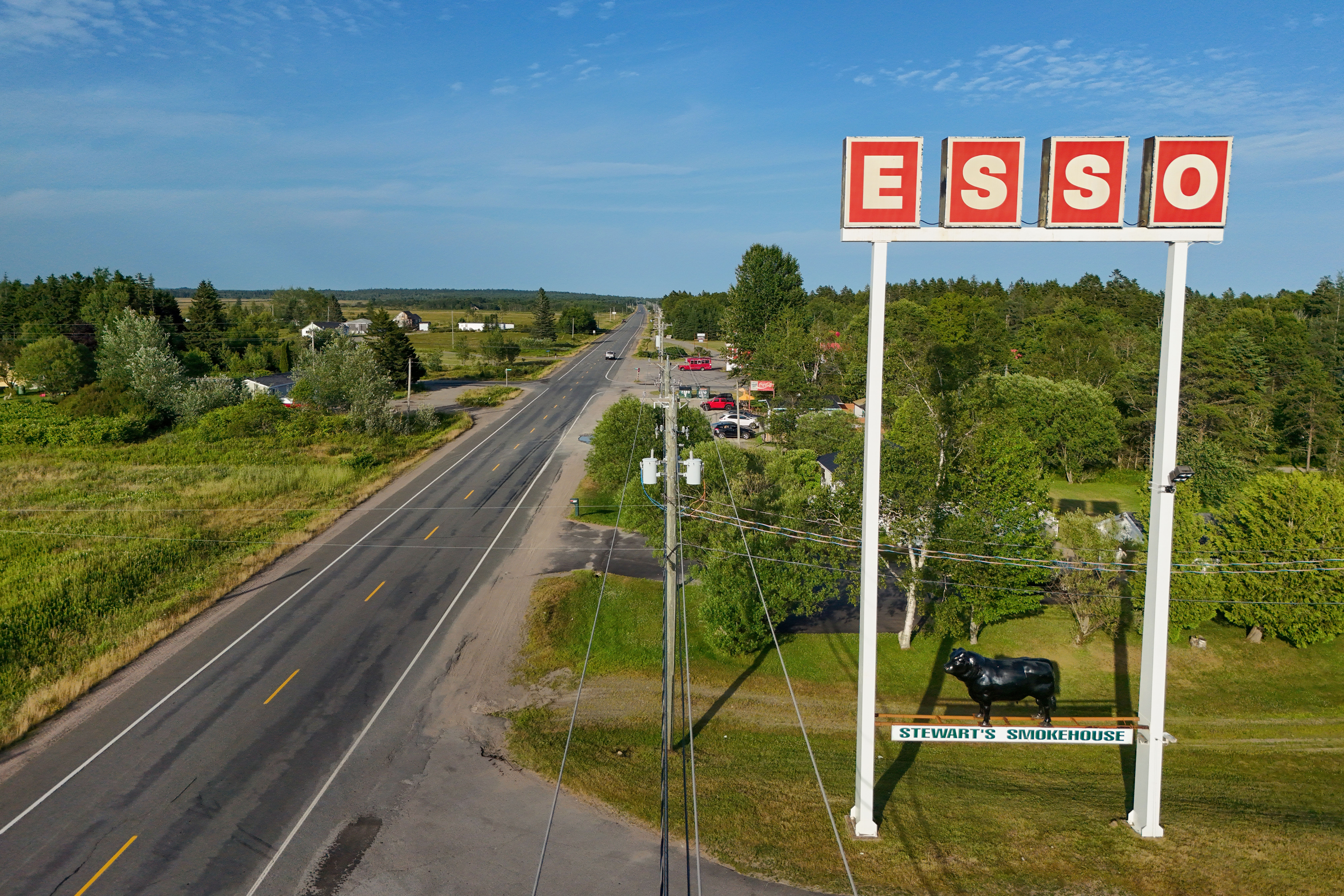

- Location within New Brunswick.
- Coordinates: 45°06′06″N 66°44′20″W
- Country: Canada
- Province: New Brunswick
- County: Charlotte
- Parish: Pennfield
- Electoral Districts Federal: New Brunswick Southwest
- Provincial: Charlotte-The Isles

Government
  - Type: Rural Community
- Time zone: UTC-4 (AST)
  - Summer (DST): UTC-3 (ADT)
- Postal code(s): E5H
- Area code: 506
- Highways Route 1 Route 175 Route 176: Route 778; Route 785

Pennfield is a community in the incorporated rural community of Eastern Charlotte, New Brunswick. It is also referred to as Pennfield Corner, Pennfield Station, and Pennfield Ridge. Pennfield intersects with Route 1, Route 175, Route 176, Route 778, and Route 785 highways.

Pennfield constitutes a portion of the Pennfield Parish Census subdivision, which had a population of 2,222 in 2021.

== History ==
In 1783, several hundred members of The Religious Society of Friends moved from the newly founded United States of America to Pennfield as a result of The American Revolution.

During the summer of 1940, an airport was constructed to train Air Observes as part of the British Commonwealth Air Training Plan. An Operational Training Unit was used at the airport to train the four trades of the aircrew for World War II action: Pilot, Navigator, Wireless Air Gunner and Air Gunner. The Royal Canadian Air Force allowed the Royal Canadian Navy to use their equipment for High Frequency Direction Finding activities against German submarines in the Atlantic.

In October 2012, Pennfield had a major highway route change when a realignment of Route 1 opened, creating a continuous freeway from the American Border to the Trans-Canada Highway at River Glade.

== Education ==
Pennfield had one elementary school, Pennfield Elementary, which closed in the fall of 2015.

== Climate ==
This climatic region is typified by large seasonal temperature differences, with warm to hot (and often humid) summers and cold (sometimes severely cold) winters. According to the Köppen Climate Classification system, Pennfield has a humid continental climate, abbreviated "Dfb" on climate maps.

Climate data for Pennfield, New Brunswick (1981−2010)
Month	Jan	Feb	Mar	Apr	May	Jun	Jul	Aug	Sep	Oct	Nov	Dec	Year
Record high °C (°F)	14.4 (57.9)	14.5 (58.1)	19.5 (67.1)	23.0 (73.4)	37.2 (99.0)	33.5 (92.3)	34.4 (93.9)	36.7 (98.1)	34.0 (93.2)	25.0 (77.0)	18.5 (65.3)	16.5 (61.7)	37.2 (99.0)
Mean daily maximum °C (°F)	−1.9 (28.6)	0.0 (32.0)	3.4 (38.1)	9.0 (48.2)	14.3 (57.7)	18.5 (65.3)	21.1 (70.0)	21.3 (70.3)	18.1 (64.6)	12.8 (55.0)	7.0 (44.6)	1.4 (34.5)	10.4 (50.7)
Daily mean °C (°F)	−7.1 (19.2)	−5.5 (22.1)	−1.5 (29.3)	4.0 (39.2)	8.7 (47.7)	12.8 (55.0)	15.6 (60.1)	15.6 (60.1)	12.4 (54.3)	7.6 (45.7)	2.7 (36.9)	−3.4 (25.9)	5.2 (41.4)
Mean daily minimum °C (°F)	−12.3 (9.9)	−10.9 (12.4)	−6.3 (20.7)	−1.0 (30.2)	3.1 (37.6)	7.0 (44.6)	10.0 (50.0)	10.0 (50.0)	6.8 (44.2)	2.4 (36.3)	−1.6 (29.1)	−8.2 (17.2)	−0.1 (31.8)
Record low °C (°F)	−36.5 (−33.7)	−31 (−24)	−28.5 (−19.3)	−14 (7)	−7.8 (18.0)	−2.2 (28.0)	2.2 (36.0)	−0.5 (31.1)	−5.0 (23.0)	−9 (16)	−18.3 (−0.9)	−35.5 (−31.9)	−36.5 (−33.7)
Average precipitation mm (inches)	126.6 (4.98)	101.3 (3.99)	130.1 (5.12)	116.0 (4.57)	130.2 (5.13)	111.0 (4.37)	107.3 (4.22)	98.0 (3.86)	120.9 (4.76)	115.8 (4.56)	140.4 (5.53)	132.0 (5.20)	1,429.7 (56.29)
Average rainfall mm (inches)	73.1 (2.88)	60.6 (2.39)	84.9 (3.34)	105.8 (4.17)	130.2 (5.13)	111.0 (4.37)	107.3 (4.22)	98.0 (3.86)	120.9 (4.76)	115.8 (4.56)	132.2 (5.20)	97.9 (3.85)	1,237.7 (48.73)
Average snowfall cm (inches)	53.5 (21.1)	40.7 (16.0)	45.2 (17.8)	10.3 (4.1)	0.0 (0.0)	0.0 (0.0)	0.0 (0.0)	0.0 (0.0)	0.0 (0.0)	0.1 (0.0)	8.3 (3.3)	34.1 (13.4)	192.0 (75.6)
Average precipitation days (≥ 0.2 mm)	11.9	10.8	13.9	16.5	18.8	18.1	18.1	17.7	16.9	16.9	16.1	13.8	189.5
Average rainy days (≥ 0.2 mm)	7.2	6.3	10.5	15.7	18.8	18.1	18.1	17.7	16.9	16.9	15.1	9.7	171.1
Average snowy days (≥ 0.2 cm)	7.1	5.9	5.2	1.8	0.0	0.0	0.0	0.0	0.0	0.05	1.5	5.5	27.0
Source: Environment Canada

== Notable people ==
- James McKay

== See also ==
- List of communities in New Brunswick
