= Seeleys Cove, New Brunswick =

Seeleys Cove
- Unincorporated community
- Location within New Brunswick.
- Coordinates: 45°05′17″N 66°39′28″W
- Country: Canada
- Province: New Brunswick
- County: Charlotte
- Parish: Pennfield
- Electoral Districts Federal: New Brunswick Southwest
- Provincial: Charlotte-The Isles

Government
  - Type: Local service district
- Time zone: UTC-4 (AST)
  - Summer (DST): UTC-3 (ADT)
- Postal code(s): E5H
- Area code: 506
- Highways: None

Seeleys Cove is a Canadian unincorporated community in Charlotte County, New Brunswick.

== History ==
Seeleys Cove is named after Justus Seelye, a Loyalist from Connecticut who had served with the King's American Dragoons on Long Island. Seelye moved to the area with his wife and four sons in 1783. He was a descendant of Robert Seeley, one of the original Puritan settlers of Massachusetts.

== See also ==
- List of communities in New Brunswick
