= James McKay (New Brunswick politician) =

Canadian politician

James McKay (February 11, 1836 – April 20, 1916) was a farmer and political figure in New Brunswick, Canada. He represented Charlotte County in the Legislative Assembly of New Brunswick from 1875 to 1878 as a Liberal member.

He was born in Pennfield, New Brunswick, the son of Alexander McKay, an Irish immigrant. On 26 December 1872 he married Mary Elizabeth Hawkins, who died 7 September 1873. On 18 March 1883 he married Ellen Gillespie (1855–1928).
