= Back Bay, New Brunswick =

Back Bay
- Unincorporated area
- Location within New Brunswick.
- Coordinates: 45°03′22″N 66°52′11″W
- Country: Canada
- Province: New Brunswick
- County: Charlotte
- Parish: Saint George
- Electoral Districts Federal: New Brunswick Southwest
- Provincial: Charlotte-The Isles

Government
  - Type: Local service district
- Time zone: UTC-4 (AST)
  - Summer (DST): UTC-3 (ADT)
- Postal code(s): E5C
- Area code: 506
- Highways: Route 172

Back Bay is an unincorporated settlement in New Brunswick, Canada on the shore of a bay of the same name in the Bay of Fundy. Back Bay is a local descriptive being on the opposite side of a peninsula from Letete, where Green's Point Lighthouse guides ships into the safe waters. It is the centre of a large aquaculture operation and is also home to the Back Bay Elementary School.

== History ==
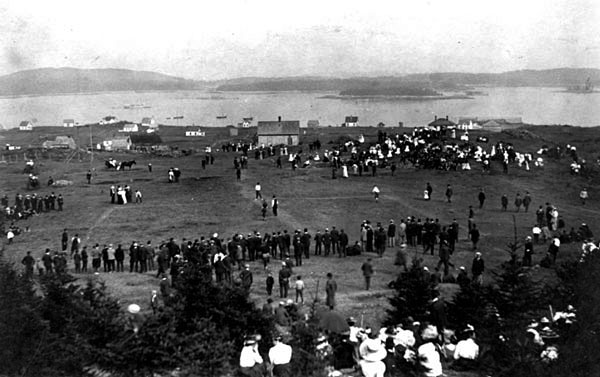
Hillside view of village picnic at Back Bay, early 1900s

In 1866 Back Bay was a farming and fishing community of about 30 families. The population in 1871 was 200 people, growing to 300 by 1898 with a post office (established in 1872), two stores, and two churches. Back Bay was home to a Connors brothers sardine factory for many years until its closure in the late 1990s.

== Aquaculture ==
A process called Integrated multi-trophic aquaculture in the Bay includes Atlantic cod, saccharina latissima (sugar kelp), alaria esculenta (winged kelp), blue mussels, and Atlantic salmon, produced in a collaborative project by the University of New Brunswick and Fisheries and Oceans Canada, and Cooke Aquaculture. There is a large aquaculture presence in Back Bay with main businesses such as Cookes Aquaculture and Mowi. There is also a lobster processing plant located in Back Bay which is owned by Bayshore lobster. There is also a large commercial fishing industry with the main fisheries being Lobster, Scallop, fish dragging, and rockweeding.
