= New Brunswick Route 176 =

Highway in New Brunswick, Canada

Route 176

Route information
- Maintained by New Brunswick Department of Transportation
- Length: 10.23 km (6.36 mi)
- Existed: 2001–present

Major junctions
- North end: Route 175 / Route 785 in Pennfield
- Route 1 in Pennfield
- South end: Route 776 / Blacks Harbour-Grand Manan Island Ferry in Blacks Harbour

Location
- Country: Canada
- Province: New Brunswick
- Major cities: Blacks Harbour

Highway system
- Provincial highways in New Brunswick; Former routes
← Route 175	→ Route 177

Route 176 is a 10-kilometre (6.2 mi)-long mostly north–south secondary highway in southwest New Brunswick, Canada.

== Route description ==
The route's northern terminus is at the intersection of Route 785 and Route 1 (exit 60) in Pennfield Corner. From there, the route passes the northern terminus of Route 778. Then, it runs southwest to the community of Justasons Corner. The road then continues almost due south passing Cricket Cove. From there, the highway changes names to Main Street as it enters the community of Blacks Harbour. The road then becomes known as Wallace Cove Road about halfway through Blacks Cove. Route 176 continues southwest passing the southern terminus of Route 778, then heads towards the community of Wallace Cove. The highway ends at the Grand Manan ferry landing, which connects the route to Grand Manan and the town of North Head via Route 776.

== History ==
Route 176 was commissioned in 2001 as a renumbering of the mainland portion of Route 776, which still exists on Grand Manan Island.
