= Moose Island (Pennfield) =

Island in New Brunswick, Canada

- Interactive map of Moose Island

Geography
- Location: Bay of Fundy
- Coordinates: 45°2′50″N 66°45′37″W

Administration
- Canada
- Province: New Brunswick
- County: Charlotte County
- Parish: Pennfield Parish

Moose Island (formerly Little Moose Island) is an undeveloped island east of Deadman's Harbour, in the Pennfield Parish of Charlotte County, New Brunswick, Canada in the Bay of Fundy.

West of Moose Island is a rocky patch.

It housed a small private golf course.
