= Crow Harbour, New Brunswick =

Crow Harbour
- Unincorporated community
- Location within New Brunswick.
- Coordinates: 45°05′59″N 66°37′27″W
- Country: Canada
- Province: New Brunswick
- County: Charlotte
- Parish: Pennfield
- Electoral Districts Federal: New Brunswick Southwest
- Provincial: Charlotte-The Isles

Government
  - Type: Local service district
- Time zone: UTC-4 (AST)
  - Summer (DST): UTC-3 (ADT)
- Postal code(s): E3L
- Area code: 506
- Highways: None

Crow Harbour is a Canadian unincorporated community in Charlotte County, New Brunswick.

== See also ==
- List of communities in New Brunswick
