= Penn Island (New Brunswick) =

Island in New Brunswick, Canada

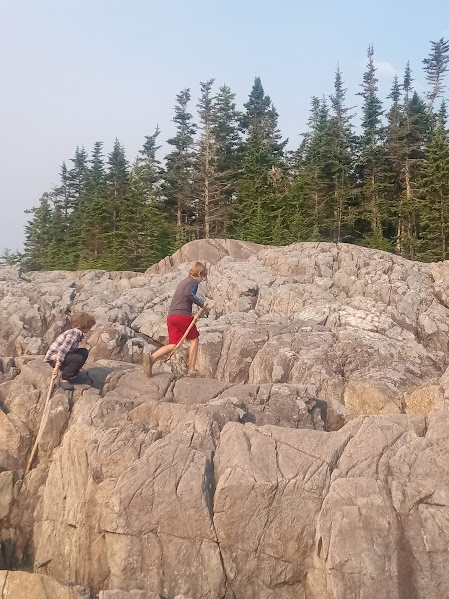
- The rock face of Penn Island's southeastern shore.
- Interactive map of Penn Island

Geography
- Location: Bay of Fundy
- Coordinates: 45°5′58″N 66°36′48″W
- Area: 11 ha (27 acres)

Administration
- Canada
- Province: New Brunswick
- County: Charlotte
- Parish: Pennfield Parish

Penn Island is an undeveloped granite island in the Pennfield Parish of Charlotte County, New Brunswick, Canada in the Bay of Fundy. It has large quartz.

In 2011, Inka Milewski addressed the Parliamentary Standing Committee on Fisheries about her research on fallowing including on a fish farm at Penn Island.

In 2009, Burton Large was killed by a falling buoy under inspection by Northern Harvest Sea Farms, being lifted out of the waters around Penn Island.

Today it is a nature preserve administered by the Nature Trust of New Brunswick, following a donation by the Duschenes family.
