= Tassal =

Tasmanian-based Australian salmon farming company

Tassal Group Limited
- Type: Subsidiary (formerly Public)
- Traded as: ASX: TGR (formerly)
- ISIN: AU000000TGR4
- Industry: Aquaculture
- Founded: 1986; 40 years ago
- Headquarters: Hobart, Tasmania, Australia
- Area served: Australasia; Asia; United States
- Products: Atlantic salmon; Black tiger prawn
- Production output: ▲Salmon 40kt; ▲Prawn 3.9kt; (2021)
- Brands: Tropic Co; Superior Gold; Tasmanian Smokehouse; De Costi Seafoods
- Revenue: ▲A$594m; (2021)
- Operating income: ▼A$61.4m; (2021)
- Net income: ▼A$34.6m; (2021)
- Number of employees: 1712 (2021)
- Parent: Cooke Inc.
- Subsidiaries: De Costi Seafoods
- Website: tassal.com.au

Tassal is a Canadian-owned aquaculture company with its main operations based in Tasmania. It was founded in 1986 and listed on the Australian Securities Exchange (ASX) from 2003 until 2022. Tassal is the largest producer of Tasmanian grown Atlantic salmon, supplying salmon to both domestic and international markets. In November 2022, it was acquired by Canadian seafood company Cooke Inc. and delisted from the ASX.

== Operations ==
As of 30 June 2021, Tassal employed a total of 1,712 people, with over 1,000 in Tasmania, 430 in NSW and 200 in Queensland.

=== Seafood and prawns ===
Operations in Queensland are focused on farming prawns. NSW operations also support the processing and distribution of seafood products other than salmon.

- Northern Prawn Fishery - Xanadu
- Mission Beach, Queensland - Prawn farm, hatchery & processing facility
- Gregory River, Queensland - Prawn farm, hatchery & processing facility
- Exmoor Station, Queensland - Aquaculture Development Area
- Yamba, New South Wales - Prawn farm & processing facility
- Lidcombe, New South Wales - Seafood processing facility

=== Salmon ===
==== Marine farming zones ====
Tassal has five marine farming zones, where the standard pen has a volume of 11,600 cubic metres and holds enough salmon to produce 120 tonnes once harvested. Salmon are kept in these large sea cages between 12 and 18 months and continue to grow until they are ready to be harvested at an average weight of 5.0 kg live weight.

- Eastern Zone, Okehampton Bay & Port Arthur
- Channel Zone, D'Entrecasteaux Channel
- Southern Zone, Dover & Huon River
- Western Zone, Macquarie Harbour
- Storm Bay Zone, Nubeena & West of Wedge

==== Freshwater hatcheries ====
Tassal operates two hatcheries, with a third to be developed, it also has access to the selective breeding program operated by SALTAS on behalf of the Salmon industry in Tasmania.

Combined, they have the capacity to produce ten million smolt a year. These smolt come from broodstock from a Tasmanian-based industry selective breeding program. The Rookwood Road Hatchery and Nursery underwent an expansion in April 2016 to make it the biggest land-based salmon nursery in Australia with the capacity to produce approximately 8 million smolt per year. After 8–12 months at Rookwood Nursery, the smolt are transferred to sea.

- Rookwood I & II Ranelagh
- Russell Falls & Karanja Mount Field
- SALTAS (industry hatchery) Wayatinah
- HRAS (future development), Hamilton

==== Processing facilities ====
Tassal has four processing facilities, including a smokehouse, one retail outlet and a mobile salmon truck.

- Huonville, Salmon processing
- Margate, Salmon processing
- Dover, Salmon processing
- Triabunna, Rendering facility

== Acquisitions ==
On 1 February 2005, Tassal acquired Aquatas from Webster.

On 31 December 2007, Tassal announced it was acquiring the assets and intellectual property of Superior Gold from the King Island Company, a wholly owned subsidiary of National Foods, for $26.5m.

On 1 July 2015, Tassal announced the acquisition of DeCosti Seafoods.

In September 2018, De Costi Seafoods, a wholly owned subsidiary of Tassal Group, acquired the land, assets and inventory of the Fortune Group prawn aquaculture business.

On 16 August 2022, Tassal Group was acquired by the Canadian aquaculture company Cooke Inc. at 5.23 Australian dollars per share, or a total of 1.7 billion Australian dollars (1.19 billion US dollars). This was the third, highest offer Cooke Inc. made to Tassal.

== Partnerships ==
In 2012, Tassal and WWF announced the “WWF Australia and Tassal Sustainable Aquaculture partnership".

Third party certification is currently provided by Aquaculture Stewardship Council (ASC), Best Aquaculture Practices, Global Salmon Initiative.

== Environmental sustainability ==
In 2016, ABC News reported that Tassal would begin trials into farming three native seaweed species (Lessonia corrugata, Ecklonia radiata and Macrocysts pyrifera) alongside salmon and oyster on its farm leases to diversify the ecosystem of the farms. The macroalgae farming in the salmon cages also absorb pollution, such as chemicals and parasites.

Tassal became the 17th member of the Global Salmon Initiative in February 2018. In 2018, they moved towards 100% recycling of their hard and soft plastic.

=== Violations ===
Communications between Tassal and the Department of Primary Industries, Parks, Water and Environment (DPIPWE) recorded several "unacceptable environmental impacts" from 2005 and 2009, something Greens leader Kim Booth called a "background of non-compliance."

During November 2016, non-compliances were detected at leases in Macquarie Harbour, where three salmon companies farm. Tassal alerted the EPA to issues and subsequently destocked its Franklin lease in the harbour. The lease was fallowed for 18 months, during which time Aquaculture Stewardship Council was not pursued for the lease as there were no fish in it.

In May 2017, the ASC found Tassal had failed to comply with 19 requirements for ASC Certification in Macquarie Harbour.

=== Inquiry witness tampering ===
In February 9, 2017 a senate committee was established to investigate claims of witness tampering made in a 2016 episode of the investigative television program Four Corners. The show focused on the Tasmanian Salmon aquaculture industry and the local opposition to bay leases, with issues covered including environmental impact, health and sustainability practices of Tassal in particular. The episode included interviews with Dover mussel farmer Warwick Hastwell who accused Tassal of ruining his business. Located downstream from Tassel's main farm, mussels stopped growing there after being covered with orange tunicate, an invasive invertebrate that Hastwell believed originated from in-water cleaning of salmon pens. Hastwell claimed that Tassal had paid a lump sum for his leases and a confidentiality deed. Set to give evidence in a 2015 senate inquiry into the aquaculture industry, Tassal e-mailed Hastwell's lawyer, "We remind your clients of their obligations not to make disparaging statements whether in relation to the Senate Enquiry (sic) or to the media or otherwise." Hastwell did not appear during the senate inquiry. On February 8, 2017 Tasmanian Senator Stephen Parry told parliament that the Environment and Communications Committee reported, "Having taken the necessary steps, the committee has concluded that the witness may have been improperly influenced."

=== Representation in media ===
On 26 April 2021, Tasmanian author Richard Flanagan published the controversial non-fiction book Toxic: The Rotting Underbelly of the Tasmanian Salmon Industry, which claimed to expose a range of unethical practices in the Tasmanian salmon industry.

=== Macquarie Harbour ===
In May 2018, Tassal established a joint venture with Petuna to farm in Macquarie Harbour. The goal was to improve stocking strategies, bio-security and allow longer fallowing periods to protect the environment.

=== Antibiotic use ===
Concerns have been raised by Tasmanian community groups, such as the organization Marine Protection Tasmania, over the use of antibiotics by the company, particularly regarding the fact that there is a legally required 1000 degree day antibiotic withdrawal period before a farm salmon is slaughtered, but "wild" salmon that is fished by the public may still be contaminated with antibiotic residue. A monitoring report by the Environment Protection Authority Tasmania (EPA) that was published in July 2022 found that after heavy antibiotic use in response to a vibrio outbreak in Tassal's Sheppards lease in January of that year, flathead salmon caught 2 kilometres (1.2 mi) away from the boundary of Tassal's lease contained levels of antibiotics above the reportable threshold. Additionally, the World Health Organization has warned that antibiotics misuse contributes to antibiotic-resistant organisms developing, and that vaccination ought be used to prevent misuse. Tassal attempted to prevent the 2022 report, as well as another antibiotic residue monitoring report from September 2020, from being released to the public by the EPA.

In 2017 Tassal confirmed its use of the antibiotic oxytetracycline, which was not used in humans in 2018 in Australia, and was rated as low importance by the Australian Strategic and Technical Advisory Group on Antimicrobial Resistance.

Antibiotic use is audited annually by the ASC, whose standards forbid the use of antibiotics from the World Health Organization list of Critically Important Antimicrobials for Human Medicine.

Usage as reported by Tassal, for each annual reporting period, and as reported by the EPA for each year in kilograms per year:

Year	Antibiotic (g/t)	Antibiotic (kg/yr)
2003		285
2004		996
2005		878
2006		4,536
2007		9,295
2008		4,007
2009		3,281
2010		1,337
2011		239
2012		48
2013		391
2014		408
2015		32
2016		800
2017	17.16	0
2018	0	0
2019	54.73	2,139
2020	35.52	1,442
2021	0	146
2022		1,116

== Awards and recognition ==
- In 2012, Tassal was recognised as an "Employer of Choice" by the Tasmanian Government.
- In November 2014, Tassal became the first salmon farming company globally to achieve the Aquaculture Stewardship Council (ASC) certification across its harvest sites.
- In 2015, Tassal received the Coles “Sustainable and Ethical Excellence” award.
- In 2015, CEO Mark Ryan was awarded the Banksia Foundation Richard Pratt CEO award for contributions to sustainability nationally.
- In 2016, Seafood Intelligence benchmarked Tassal as top salmon or trout company in an international report on sustainability reporting and transparency.
- In 2021, Tassal was ranked #14 in the global Coller FAIRR Protein Producer Index, the highest for an Australian Company.

== Brands ==
Tassal owns several brands, including:

- Tassal
- Superior Gold
- Tasmanian Smokehouse
- De Costi Seafoods
- Aquatas
- Salamanca Seafood Company
