= Icicle Seafoods =

American seafood company

Icicle Seafoods is an American seafood processor and wholesaler with land-based and vessel-based processing facilities throughout Alaska. Its corporate headquarters is in Seattle, Washington.

== Overview ==
The company was started as Petersburg Fisheries, Inc. in 1965 by a group of Alaskan fishermen, led by founding CEO Robert Magnus Thorstenson, Sr., vice President Thomas E. Thompson, and fishermen Magnus A. Martens and Gordon Jensen, who would become the chairman of the board during the founders' final years. They purchased the Pacific American Fisheries, cannery in Petersburg, Alaska. These four owned 55% and the company fishermen owned 45%. In 1977, the company was renamed Icicle Seafoods, Inc.

By the early 1980s, Icicle was the world's largest halibut and black cod producer, and was among the world's top salmon producers.

The company was sold to Fox, Paine and Partners in 2007 by the original stockholders, who by this time had migrated approximately to about 75% management and employee ownership, from the original all-fishermen and manager ownership, through an ESOP plan that transferred great benefits to the company's year-round employees.

In 2016, Cooke Aquaculture purchased the company, returning the company to fishing family ownership after a decade of investment institutional ownership.

The first million dollars started the company; $100,000 from the principals and a $900,000 loan. Icicle's original shareholders sold their stock after 42 years at $86.00 per share. Their basis was 2.75 cents a share from their original investment in 1965.

Since the 1970s, Icicle has been one of the largest and most progressive and competitive seafood producers in the world, operating primarily throughout Alaska, but with operations in Canada and Washington state.

Today, Icicle is Petersburg's largest hometown employer, taxpayer, economic engine and backbone.

In February 2020, Icicle Seafoods was recognized by Whole Foods Market in its annual Supplier Awards. The company received an award in the retailer's "Raising the Bar for Quality" category. In May 2020, Icicle Seafoods merged with Ocean Beauty Seafoods to form OBI Seafoods LLC.
