= New Brunswick Route 780 =

Highway in New Brunswick, Canada

Coordinates: 45.163642°N 66.652336°W

Route 780

Route information
- Maintained by New Brunswick Department of Transportation
- Length: 29 km (18 mi)

Major junctions
- West end: Route 1 / Route 172 in Upper Letang
- East end: Route 795 in Lepreau

Location
- Country: Canada
- Province: New Brunswick

Highway system
- Provincial highways in New Brunswick; Former routes
← Route 778	→ Route 785

Route 780 is a 29-kilometre (18 mi) long mostly west–east secondary highway in the southwestern portion of New Brunswick, Canada.

== Route description ==
The route, also known as Old Saint John Road, is mostly in Charlotte County.

The route's western terminus is in the community of Upper Letang at the western terminus of Route 172 and exit 56 of Route 1. From here, it travels north past Lake Utopia at Woodbury Cove before crossing Route 785 in Utopia. It then travels east through wooded and farm areas past Shaw Lake to a crossing of the Pocologan River. The route continues and crosses the New River as it enters New River. It then passes through a mostly forested area before crossing Route 1 and ending in Lepreau at Route 795 near the Lepreau River.
