= Letete, New Brunswick =

Letete
- Unincorporated community
- Letete
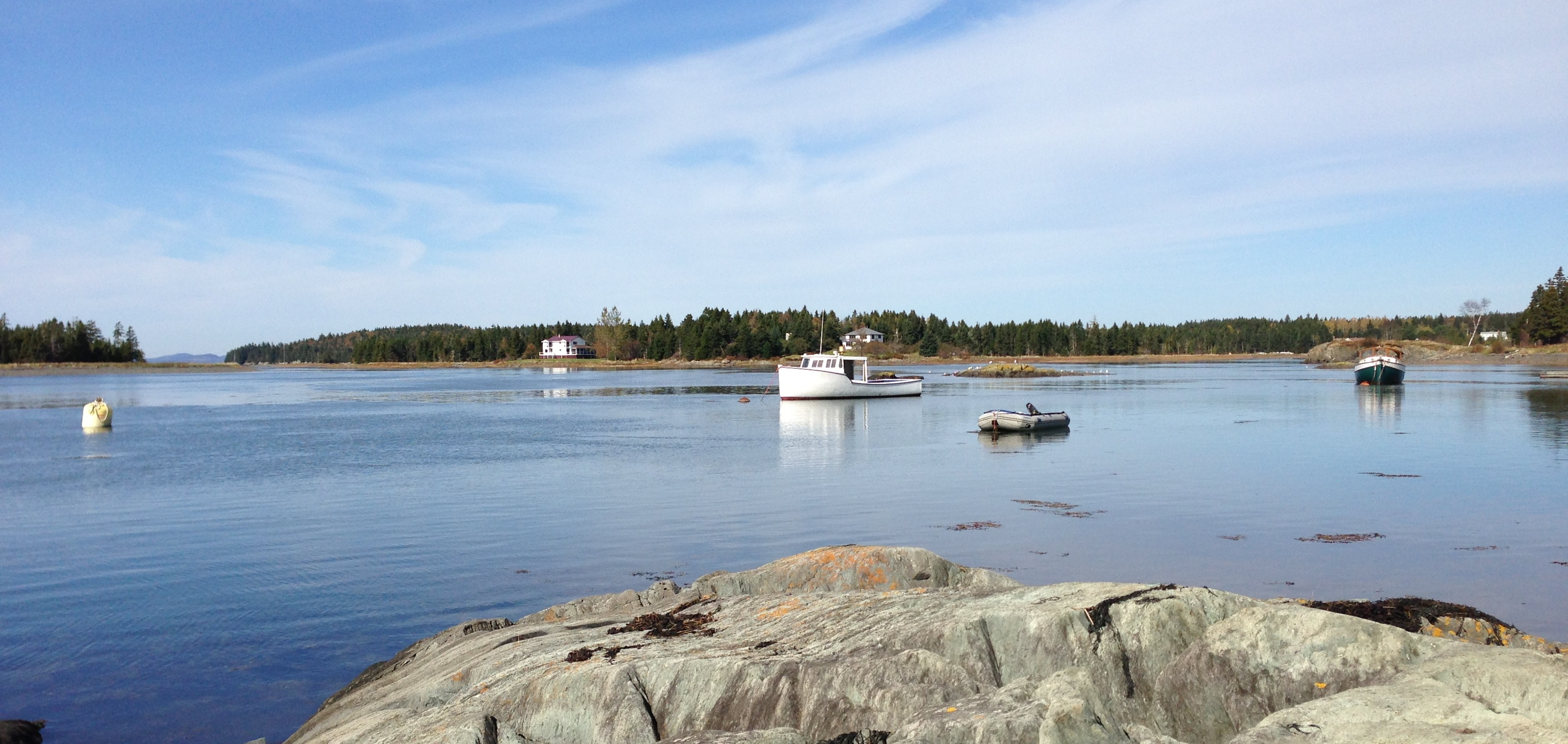

- Location within New Brunswick.
- Coordinates: 45°03′31″N 66°53′29″W
- Country: Canada
- Province: New Brunswick
- County: Charlotte
- Parish: Saint George
- Electoral Districts Federal: New Brunswick Southwest
- Provincial: Charlotte-The Isles

Government
  - Type: Local service district
- Time zone: UTC-4 (AST)
  - Summer (DST): UTC-3 (ADT)
- Postal code(s): E5C
- Area code: 506
- Highways: Route 172

Letete or L'Etete (Note: The government of New Brunswick is inconsistent in spelling, even among documents from the same department; Letete is three times as common in query results on the Province of New Brunswick website and is the official spelling according to the Canadian Geographical Names Database. Letite is an older spelling of the name.) (derived from the French translation for "the head" or "la tête") is a Canadian unincorporated community located in Charlotte County, New Brunswick and marks the southeast point of Passamaquoddy Bay.

== Location ==
The primary route in and out of the village is either via Route 172 or the Letete to Deer Island Ferry, which travels between the settlement and Deer Island. Letete is located southwest of St. George and directly west of the neighbouring community of Back Bay.

To the west of Letete is the body of water known as Passamaquoddy Bay.

To the southeast of Letete, beyond a number of small islands that protect the shared Letete and Back Bay peninsula is the Bay of Fundy, which has some of the highest tides in the world.

It hosts Green's Point Lighthouse.

== History ==
In the 1860s, Letete was primarily a fishing and farming community with approximately 60 resident families. In 1871 it had a population of approximately 200. In 1898 it had one post office, two stores, one church, and a population that had grown to approximately 400 people.

== Notable people ==
- James N. Tucker, Jr. - Politician
- Gifford Cooke - Marine mechanic and founder of Cooke Inc. along with his two sons

== See also ==
- List of communities in New Brunswick
