= Hoyt Island =

Island in New Brunswick, Canada

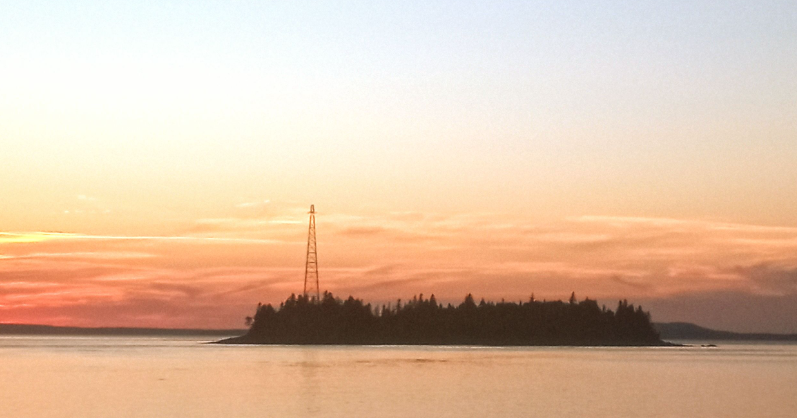
- Hoyt Island, and its Nub.
- Interactive map of Hoyt Island

Geography
- Location: Bay of Fundy
- Coordinates: 45°3′16″N 66°54′42″W

Administration
- Canada
- Province: New Brunswick
- County: Charlotte
- Parish: Saint George Parish

Hoyt Island (formerly Hoit Island) is an undeveloped island in the Saint George Parish of Charlotte County, New Brunswick, Canada in the Bay of Fundy.

In 1875, a fishing weir was licensed off the island to Andrew and James McLean.
