= Utopia, New Brunswick =

Utopia
- Unincorporated community
- Location within New Brunswick.
- Coordinates: 45°08′52″N 66°46′17″W
- Country: Canada
- Province: New Brunswick
- County: Charlotte
- Parish: Saint George
- Electoral Districts Federal: New Brunswick Southwest
- Provincial: Charlotte-The Isles

Government
  - Type: Local service district
- Time zone: UTC-4 (AST)
  - Summer (DST): UTC-3 (ADT)
- Postal code(s): E5C
- Area code: 506
- Highways: Route 780; Route 785

Utopia is a Canadian unincorporated community in Charlotte County, New Brunswick.

== History ==
=== Camp Utopia ===
Utopia was home to Camp Utopia, the Canadian Army A-30 Canadian Infantry Training Centre from 1943 to 1958. Units lodged here:

- The Carleton and York Regiment and The North Shore (New Brunswick) Regiment - 1943 to 1954.
- 8th Canadian Hussars (Princess Louise's) - 1954-1955

The base was replaced by a new and large base located in Gagetown in 1958. The structures at the base were demolished and left vacant since.

== See also ==
- List of communities in New Brunswick
