= Justasons Corner, New Brunswick =

Justasons Corner
- Unincorporated community
- Location within New Brunswick.
- Coordinates: 45°06′03″N 66°45′45″W
- Country: Canada
- Province: New Brunswick
- County: Charlotte
- Parish: Pennfield
- Electoral Districts Federal: New Brunswick Southwest
- Provincial: Charlotte-The Isles

Government
  - Type: Local service district
- Time zone: UTC-4 (AST)
  - Summer (DST): UTC-3 (ADT)
- Postal code(s): E5H
- Area code: 506

Justasons Corner is a Canadian unincorporated community in Charlotte County, New Brunswick. It was named after Justus Justason, who was a loyalist from New Jersey.

The community is grouped around C K Justason Lane where it crosses Route 176.

== See also ==
- List of communities in New Brunswick
