= New Brunswick Route 785 =

Highway in New Brunswick, Canada

Coordinates: 45.403271°N 66.774216°W

Route 785

Route information
- Maintained by New Brunswick Department of Transportation
- Length: 69 km (43 mi)

Major junctions
- North end: Route 101 in Central Blissville
- South end: Route 1 / Route 175 / Route 176 / Route 778 in Pennfield

Location
- Country: Canada
- Province: New Brunswick

Highway system
- Provincial highways in New Brunswick; Former routes
← Route 780	→ Route 790

Route 785 is a 68.8-kilometre (42.8 mi) long mostly north–south secondary highway in the southwestern portion of New Brunswick, Canada. Locally, this road may be known as either the "Shin Creek Road" or the "Mine Road". In the early 1980s, a mine was established off Route 785, at Mount Pleasant. Today, Adex Mining holds a mineral claim on the mine however the mine is currently in an idle state. As a result of mine development at Mount Pleasant, Route 785 was heavily developed and rerouted from the original stage coach trail. Another local name for the road is the "Sheldon Lee Highway", a humorous reference to former New Brunswick Minister of Transportation, Hon. Sheldon Lee, who continued developing the road during his terms in office, especially on the portion of road north of Mount Pleasant. Mr. Lee lived in the community of Bonny River, which is located near the southern end of Route 785, and like many people today, frequently used Route 785 for travel to Fredericton from the St. George area, roughly shaving off 40km per trip when compared to highway travel. Today, the road is heavily used by forest operations.

== Route description ==
Most of the route is in Charlotte County, while some of it is in Sunbury County.

The route's northern terminus is in the community of Central Blissville at route Route 101, close to the South Branch Oromocto River. It travels southeast through mostly wooded and farm areas to Blissville. The route continues south over a railway crossing, past Scribner Falls, Cranberry Lake, McDougall Lake, McLean Cove, Blind Lake, and Widgeon Lake. The route continues and passes between Mill Lake and Lake Utopia before intersecting with Route 780 as it passes through Utopia. The route then passes Mill Cove as it ends in Pennfield at Route 176, Route 1 and Route 795
