= Omega Protein =

American manufacturing company

Omega Protein Corporation
- Type: Subsidiary (formerly Public)
- Traded as: NYSE: OME (formerly)
- Industry: Nutritional products manufacturing
- Founded: 1913
- Headquarters: Reedville, Virginia
- Revenue: $308.6 million USD (2014)
- Number of employees: 1150
- Parent: Cooke Inc.
- Website: www.omegaprotein.com

Omega Protein Corporation was a publicly traded US company, founded in 1913 as a fishing operation. As of 2015 it still operated a fishing fleet, and produced food ingredients, dietary supplements and animal feed. Their products included fish oil, fish meal, and proteins. In the 2000s it expanded via acquisitions into ingredients produced from milk and plants. On December 19, 2017, Cooke Inc. completed its acquisition of Omega Protein for $22.00 per share.

== Activities ==
Omega Protein's fishing fleet takes about 90% of the menhaden harvested in US waters, an essential food for the depleting osprey population. The extent of its harvest has been a subject of controversy. In December 2012, in the face of the depletion of Atlantic menhaden, the Atlantic States Marine Fisheries Commission imposed a limit on Omega's operations, "capping the total annual commercial catch at 170,800 metric tons, about 80 percent of the average harvest from the last three years."

== Environmental record ==
For decades Omega Protein has been at the center of controversy over its role in depleting the menhaden populations in the East Coast and in the Chesapeake Bay. The company has been cited for 25 violations of Occupational Safety and Health Administration rules and numerous counts of violation of the Clean Water Act. In 2017 the SEC's subpoena for information on a subsidiary's compliance with probation terms and protection for whistle-blowers caused company stocks to plunge 20%.

=== Industry promotion and certifications ===
In 2008 and 2009 Omega Protein received certification from Friend of the Sea, a project for the certification and promotion of seafood from sustainable fisheries and aquaculture. Omega Protein's operations in both the Gulf and along the Atlantic have been regularly recertified since their first certification, with the Gulf of Mexico fishery most recently being recertified in the fall of 2014.

Wisconsin Specialty Protein is a subsidiary of Omega Protein; its Reedsburg, Wisconsin facility received the Gold Medal Award in the Green Building category as an Associated Builders and Contractors of Wisconsin 2009 Project of Distinction. and received the Annual Innovation Zone Award from the Dairy Business Innovation Center.

=== 2013 Clean Water Act violation ===
Omega Protein was charged with two counts of discharging pollutants and harmful amounts of oil from its Reedville, Virginia-based fishing vessels into U.S. waters in violation of the Clean Water Act for violations between May 2008 and December 2010. The company was later sentenced for both violations in United States District Court in Norfolk, Virginia, with 3 years of probation and financial penalties totaling $7.5 million. The company has since paid the fines in full and conducted additional community service to clean regional waterways.

== 2011 collision and sinking ==
Omega Protein reported that late in the evening on May 18, 2011, an Omega Protein vessel, the F/V Sandy Point, was involved in a collision with a commercial cargo vessel, the Eurus London, in Mississippi waters approximately eight miles south of Gulfport, Mississippi near Ship Island. As a result of the collision, the F/V Sandy Point took on water and sank. At the time of the collision, 16 crew members were aboard Omega Protein's vessel. Authorities accounted for 13 of Omega Protein's crew members. A search and rescue effort was immediately deployed for the remaining three crew members. Joseph von Rosenberg, chairman and chief executive officer at the time of the incident, stated "We are assisting the United States Coast Guard and the Mississippi Department of Marine Resources in the search for our remaining crew members. Our main concern at this time is for our missing 3 crew members and their families." The three missing crew members' bodies were found May 20 and 21. The cause for the collision remains unknown pending a lengthy investigation.

== 2010 BP oil spill ==
The oil slick resulting from the Deepwater Horizon oil spill had an adverse effect on Omega Protein's ability to operate in the fishing grounds east of the Mississippi River Delta, near its Moss Point, Mississippi facility. Regulators closed areas there to commercial fishing. The company developed additional contingency response plans to move its vessels from Morgan City, Louisiana farther west to its Abbeville and Cameron facilities should regulators close a greater portion of the fishing grounds. Following the spill, Omega Protein filed a claim with the Gulf Coast Claims Facility (GCCF) to be reimbursed for costs and lost profits resulting from the incident. The GCCF administers funds paid by BP in connection with reimbursements for claims caused by the Deepwater Horizon disaster.

== 2014 explosion ==
On July 28, 2014, an explosion occurred at the company's fish processing plant in Moss Point, Mississippi. Four men were repairing a fish oil storage tank when the top blew off, killing one contract employee and injuring three others. The incident involved employees of a subcontractor who were working on two tanks.
