= North Head, New Brunswick =

Community on Grand Manan Island, New Brunswick

Coordinates: 44.762°N 66.746°W

Location of North Head in New Brunswick

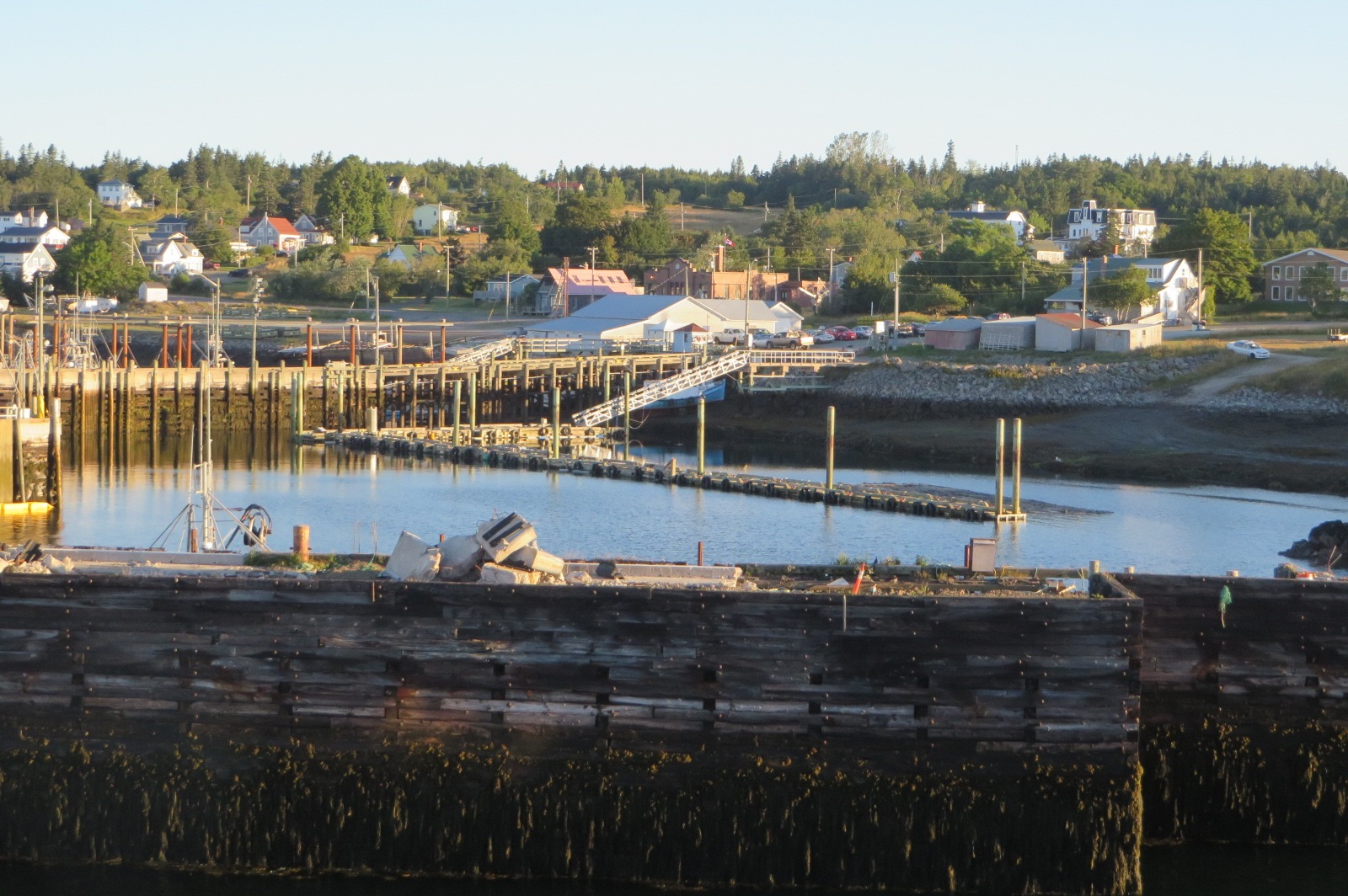
North Head harbor

North Head is a community on the island of Grand Manan, New Brunswick. Formerly a separate village, it was amalgamated into the newly formed village of Grand Manan in 1995. North Head is the southern terminus of the Blacks Harbour to Grand Manan Island Ferry.

== History ==
Federal census population history of North Head
Year	Pop.	±%
1971	649	—
1976	647	−0.3%
1981	661	+2.2%
1986	654	−1.1%
1991	711	+8.7%
Source: Statistics Canada

== Notable people ==
- Alison Hawthorne Deming, author, poet, essayist, teacher
- Allan Moses (1881 – 1953), naturalist, taxidermist, conservationist

== See also ==
- List of communities in New Brunswick
