= Coastal Transport Limited =

Canadian ferry company

- Type: Ferry company
- Predecessor: Marine Atlantic Incorporated
- Founded: April 1997
- Founder: Murray O. Ryder
- Headquarters: Saint John, New Brunswick
- Area served: Atlantic Canada

Grand Manan Adventure ferry at Blacks Harbour

Coastal Transport Limited (Coastal Transport) is a ferry company operating in eastern Canada on the Bay of Fundy with headquarters in Saint John, New Brunswick. The company began as a wholly owned subsidiary of Marine Atlantic Incorporated (MAI), and in April 1997 was sold to Murray O. Ryder, the former MAI Vice President of Operations.

Coastal Transport is a member of the Tourism Industry Association of New Brunswick (TIANB).

== Operations ==
The vessels Coastal Transport operates and manages are owned by the New Brunswick Department of Transportation and Infrastructure.

Coastal Transport operates a year-round ferry service in Atlantic Canada which include:

- Blacks Harbour to Grand Manan Island Ferry - The Grand Manan Adventure (2011–present), and the Grand Manan V (1990–present) currently being used on this route. The route runs between Blacks Harbour on the mainland to North Head on Grand Manan Island. The ferry crosses the Bay of Fundy, linking Mainland New Brunswick in West Isles Parish in Blacks Harbour at the southern terminus of New Brunswick Route 176 to the largest island in New Brunswick at the northern terminus of New Brunswick Route 776 in the neighbourhood of North Head on the east side of Grand Manan Island. The crossing is 32 kilometres (20 mi) in length, takes 1.5 hours, and is priced based per vehicle and persons. The two ferries provide service on the route, carrying up to 82 cars at a time. Service is provided year-round, with ferries operating at least hourly between 0600 and 2200, and half-hourly for most of the day. The service is operated by the New Brunswick Department of Transportation, and during the winter months provides the only public route access to Grand Manan Island.
- Grand Manan Island to White Head Island Ferry - The William Frankland is currently being used for this route. The route runs between Ingalls Head on Grand Manan Island and White Head Island.
- L'Etete to Deer Island Ferry - The Deer Island Princess II and the John E. Rigby are currently being used for this route. The route runs between L'Etete on the mainland and Deer Island. The ferry crosses Passamaquoddy Bay, linking Mainland New Brunswick in Saint George Parish south of L'Etete at the southern terminus of New Brunswick Route 172 to the largest island of the West Isles Parish, New Brunswick at the northern terminus of New Brunswick Route 772 north of Stuart Cove on the east side of Deer Island . The crossing is 5 kilometres (3.1 mi) in length, takes 20 minutes, and is free of tolls. The two ferries provide service on the route, carrying up to 24 cars at a time. Service is provided year-round, with ferries operating at least hourly between 0600 and 2200, and half-hourly for most of the day. The service is operated by the New Brunswick Department of Transportation, and during the winter months provides the only road access to Deer Island.

== Staff ==
Murray Ryder is the President of the company and his son, Gregg, is the General Manager. Murray was formerly the vice-president (Fundy and PEI region) for Marine Atlantic (1990-1996) before purchasing Coastal Transport from them in 1997. Both the Ryders have been very active in the Canadian Ferry Operators Association (CFOA). Murray has held various positions including Vice-President (1997-1999), Secretary-Treasurer (2006), and Treasurer (2007–2008). In 2009 he was replaced by his son, Gregg, who continues to serve as an Executive Member as Treasurer (2009-2014), and as a Member-At-Large. In 2012, he spoke at the CFOA annual conference on the topic "Strategic Infrastructure Investments: Fundy Islands Ferry Services."

In 2011, despite having an annual budget of close to $10 million, Gregg (then being referred to as the Director of Finance) denied that the business was very profitable. In an interview with Canadian Sailings, he stated: "There is not a lot of money to be made... We are basically paid a management fee to operate the vessels for the government."

Blacks Harbour Branch Manager Morris Harris became a minor Maritime internet celebrity when his custom outhouse was stolen from his hunting camp. The company was also in the news in December 2015, when staff helped a passenger delivery a baby during the voyage.

== Fleet ==
MS Grand Manan Adventure has a car capacity of 82, a passenger capacity of 360, a gross tonnage of 6580 and a net tonnage of 1974. First registered in 2011, she is 80.28 metres (263.4 ft) in length, 18.5 metres (61 ft) in breadth and 13.75 metres (45.1 ft) in depth. MS Grand Manan V has a car capacity of 65, a passenger capacity of 300, a gross tonnage of 3833 and a net tonnage of 2935. First registered in 1990, she is 70.32 metres (230.7 ft) in length, 15.03 metres (49.3 ft) in breadth and 9.6 metres (31 ft) in depth. The two ferries are both propeller driven.

Deer Island Princess II has a car capacity of 24, a passenger capacity of 99, a gross tonnage of 335 and a net tonnage of 95. First registered in 2001, she is 39.90 metres (130.9 ft) in length, 12.50 metres (41.0 ft) in breadth and 2.40 metres (7 ft 10 in) in depth. John E. Rigby has a car capacity of 17, a passenger capacity of 30, a gross tonnage of 231 and a net tonnage of 227. First registered in 1976, she is 30.97 metres (101.6 ft) in length, 11.91 metres (39.1 ft) in breadth and 2.16 metres (7 ft 1 in) in depth. The two ferries are both propeller driven.

== The Grand Manan Adventure ==
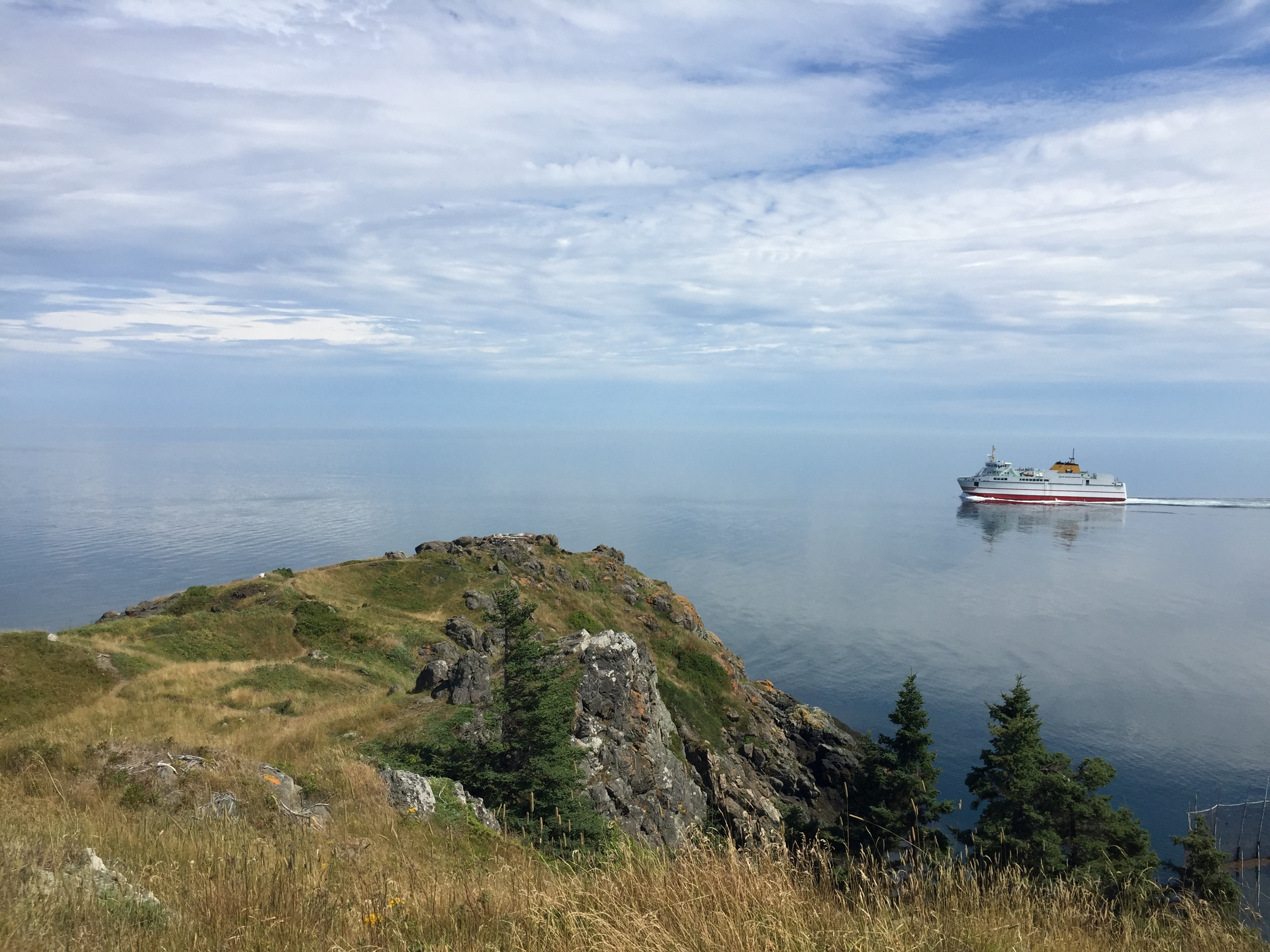
The Grand Manan Adventure from Swallowtail Lighthouse

In 2009, the Government of New Brunswick announced a plan to replace the Grand Manan V. The Transportation Minister at the time, Denis Landry, stated that four shipyards submitted five proposals. The Panama, Florida-based Eastern Shipbuilding Group Inc. won a $65 million contract to build the vessel, an 82-car ferry. Grand Manan residents were invited to participate in a contest to name the new vessel, and a panel of local residents reviewed the entries and made the selection. The winning name was the Grand Manan Adventure, and was submitted by Deborah Avery. For submitting the winning entry, she was also awarded a spot for herself and three guests on the vessel's maiden voyage, along with certificates and a plaque. The Adventure is a 281-foot, single-ended roll-on, roll-off ferry that can accommodate 82 cars or 10 full-size tractor trailers in four vehicle lanes, and a maximum of 380 people. The vessel, one of the largest ferries to be constructed by Eastern Shipbuilding, was to delivered in July 2011. The Adventure's maiden voyage was on August 11, 2011. It departed Black's Harbour at 11 a.m. with about 200 invited guests aboard, including then-Premier David Alward.

However, the new vessel has been plagued with problems from the outset:

- On July 26, 2011, during sea trials in Florida, the ferry overheated due to a pipe failure; subsequent repairs delayed the intended delivery date by several weeks.
- On August 15, 2011, four days after its maiden voyage, the ferry began experiencing electrical issues, which manifested themselves in the failure of the bow thrusters, one after the other, following docking. It was returned to service on August 18, but was returned to dry dock on September 11 for 10 days of additional repairs. These repairs were covered by warranty.
- On October 5, 2011 (shortly after being returned to service), the ferry experienced further engine problems, forcing it to dock on October 6, 2011. A broken bolt caused problems with one of the cylinders, requiring extensive repairs. It remained out of service until October 25.
- On March 31, 2012, the ferry broke down due to a faulty seal and remained out of service for nine days.
- On July 22, 2013, the ferry experienced mechanical difficulties and went out of service. The problem turned out to be a broken turbocharger, which was not fully repaired until July 26, causing the vessel to miss eight scheduled crossings.
- On March 3, 2014, the vessel's engine developed an internal problem, a crack in the lube oil distribution system, which caused the engine to overheat. As the vessel's warranty had expired, Coastal Transport was on the hook for repair costs. Company president Murray Ryder defended himself against accusations that the vessel was a lemon, and stated that it was simply continuing to have "teething problems."
- On April 4, 2014, the ferry experienced mechanical difficulties and was company was forced to cancel all its crossings. The engine's turbocharger overheated, and ultimately had to be replaced. The replacement turbocharger had to be ordered from Illinois, and did not ship until April 21. The ferry finally resumed service on May 2.
- On March 25, 2015, the ferry was taken off its regular run due to engine problems. The problems began on March 24, when the crews could not get the engines running. On Wednesday morning, they sailed to the mainland on one engine in hopes of getting help. The ferry resumed service late afternoon on March 26.
- On April 7, 2015, the ferry's 3:30pm and 5:30pm crossings were cancelled due to mechanical difficulties; it returned to service the following day.
- On May 14, 2015, the ferry's 9:00pm crossing was cancelled, ostensibly for "routine maintenance."
- On August 9, 2015, a number of crossings were cancelled, likely due to mechanical issues. It returned to service on August 11.

On August 11, 2015, the provincial government announced they had a plan to study the chronic problems the vessel had been having, in order to determine their cause. The Department of Transportation and Infrastructure stated they planned to engage an independent team from Newfoundland to assess the situation. Early speculation from locals has focused on how many of the problems have originated on the port side of the vessel. Frustration among the local population has been mounting. When interviewed by the CBC, former MLA Eric Allaby said: "there's something dreadfully wrong with some of the mechanics of this ferry." Local resident Tammy Worthen stated that the boat was now "affectionately known as the 'Misadventure.'"

Once the report was released, (a redacted copy is available on the Province of New Brunswick's website), the company announced in August 2016 they were replacing both the engines aboard the vessel, at a cost of $400,000.

Former vessels in the fleet include the Grand Manan (1965-2011) and the Lady White Head.

== Fees Controversy ==
In August 2010, in the period leading up to the New Brunswick provincial election, David Alward, the leader of the New Brunswick provincial Conservative Party pledged to remove the toll on the ferry to Grand Manan if they won the election. Alward claimed that the ferry service was unique in the province in that it charged a toll, and that it was unfair to island residents. He promised that Coastal Transport would be fully subsidized to compensate, and that the schedule would remain the same. These changes, he argued, would make it more attractive for people to work, live, and operate businesses on Grand Manan, and that it would prove a boon for tourism. But the suggestion itself was decried by the incumbent MLA and the Mayor of Grand Manan. Mayor Dennis Greene stated that businesses, council, the tourism sector, and the island's transportation committee were not consulted prior to the announcement. The cost of eliminating the fees was estimated to be $1.7 million.

On September 27, 2010, Alward and the Conservatives won the provincial election. The following August, Alward stated that he would keep his election promise to eliminate the fees, and that although it wouldn't happen by the end of 2011, it would by the end of his mandate. Gregg Ryder spoke on the issue in December 2011: "There is a reason most ferry operations are associated with government fiscally and legally for subsidies. The population density is not there at this end of the country to the extent it is for B.C. Ferries." He added, "Coastal Transport simply collects the fares on behalf of the province. If the province chooses to remove the fares, they are in effect eliminating one of their revenue streams. But many Grand Mananers have long held the view that they pay the only tolls in the province. They reject the comparison with the Princess of Acadia since it is interprovincial, as well as the now-defunct Yarmouth, N.S.-Bar Harbor run. With high fuel and labour costs, very few Canadian ferry operations are sustainable without government subsidy. We are no exception to this."

In March 2012 the fees still remained in place. The Village of Grand Manan then held a plebiscite, asking: "Should the Council of the Village of Grand Manan ask the Government of New Brunswick to remove the fare to travel on the ferry to and from the mainland?" The plebiscite subsequently passed by a narrow margin, 556 for and 511 against, with a voter turnout of 67 per cent. Alward responded by saying: "I certainly respect the people of Grand Manan and have full intention to respect our commitments. I do appreciate the decision that the people have made where they are recommending to government to see the ferry fees removed. That is great for the economy of Grand Manan in the long term, and I have full intention to respect their wishes." By September 2012, the fees were still in place and although many politicians expected the Alward government to live up to its promise, they assumed it would be done towards the end of his four-year mandate.

In April 2013, Alward's government announced their intention to reduce the amount of ferry crossings by one run daily, and that this would result in savings of $1 million per year. This move was met with a wave of opposition and a petition against it. However, these cuts did not materialize.

In perhaps his final public remarks on the matter, made during the reopening ceremony of The Algonquin Resort in June 2014, Alward said: "I guess we haven't come to a final decision on it. There hadn't been a clean mandate or majority from the community in terms of the support on that. If we look at the ferry when it was built, it was built with a lot more capacity than was really needed and so we looked at changing some of the runs so what the community said at the time is, 'why don't you look at keeping the runs going the way it is because we believe it's important to the economy of the island and also to the movement of people?' So that's where we've been at. We thought that was the most important priority at the time so that's where we have focused. We haven't made a final decision where we're going to land on the other part."

That same month, Transportation and Infrastructure Minister Claude Williams reiterated that the fares would remain. Many islanders felt that the government had reneged on its promise, and that the matter would become an election issue. The impact of this is unclear, but Alward's mandate ended in 2014 with the fees still in place, and his Conservatives were defeated at the polls by the Liberal Party, led by Brian Gallant.

== Service to Deer Island ==
In 2012 Coastal Transport won a 15-year contract, valued at $13.8 million per year, to operate the L'Etete to Deer Island ferry as well as the Grand Manan and White Head ferry service. .
