= Letang, New Brunswick =

Letang
- Unincorporated community
- Location within New Brunswick.
- Coordinates: 45°04′56″N 66°49′29″W
- Country: Canada
- Province: New Brunswick
- County: Charlotte
- Parish: Saint George
- Electoral Districts Federal: New Brunswick Southwest
- Provincial: Charlotte-The Isles
- Time zone: UTC-4 (AST)
  - Summer (DST): UTC-3 (ADT)
- Postal code(s): E5C
- Area code: 506
- Highways: Route 172

Letang (formerly spelt L'Etang; Maliseet-Passamaquoddy: Men-ha-wa-dik) is a Canadian unincorporated community in Charlotte County, New Brunswick. The name comes from the French l'étang, which means "the pond".
