= Blacks Harbour, New Brunswick =

Blacks Harbour
- Aerial view (2026)

- Location within New Brunswick.
- Coordinates: 45°03′32″N 66°47′05″W
- Country: Canada
- Province: New Brunswick
- County: Charlotte
- Municipality: Eastern Charlotte
- Incorporated: 1972
- Amalgamated: 1 January 2023

Area
  - Total: 9.02 km^{2} (3.48 sq mi)

Population (2021)
  - Total: 907
  - Density: 100.6/km^{2} (261/sq mi)
  - Pop 2016-2021: ▲1.5
  - Dwellings: 421
- Time zone: UTC-4 (AST)
  - Summer (DST): UTC-3 (ADT)
- Postal code(s): E5H
- Area code: 506
- Highways Route 176: Route 778

Blacks Harbour is a former village in the rural community of Eastern Charlotte, New Brunswick, Canada. It is on a harbour of the same name opening onto the Bay of Fundy. It is 15 kilometres southeast of the town of St. George, 3 kilometres west of Beaver Harbour and 56 kilometres east from the town of St. Stephen on Route 176. For much of its history Blacks Harbour was a company town dependent on the fish processing company Connors Brothers Limited.

== History ==
Beginning in the 1780s 15 land grants were made in the area of Blacks Harbour. In 1866 there was a settlement with about 14 fishing families. It had a population of 100 in 1871.

James Connors, an Irish-born fisherman, and his sons Lewis and Patrick Connors bought land at Blacks Harbour, where they built a wharf and fish houses. They owned several fishing weirs and boats and sold herring and other salted and frozen fish in Canadian and American markets. In 1885 the brothers started a canning business and the following year they built a store to serve the growing population of workers at their various enterprises in Blacks Harbour. Having begun by canning clams, scallops, clam chowder and berries, they started canning sardines in 1889. The business was labour intensive, employing both men and women. The Connors brothers provided housing and services to the employees, who were able to purchase goods from the company store on credit, with the amount owing deducted from their wages. In 1893 the business was incorporated as Connors. Bros. Ltd.. The company owned all the land in the community as well as the employees' houses and the only store in the community.

Blacks Harbour had a post office from 1885. In 1898 its population was 150, which had increased to 200 in 1904. The first school in Blacks Harbour was built by the company in 1912. Electricity was brought to the community in 1928, when Connors Bros. purchased power from the New Brunswick Electric Power Commission. Blacks Harbour continued to be a company town until after George Weston Limited bought Connors. Bros. in 1967.

In 1972 Blacks Harbour was incorporated as a village with an elected mayor and council. The fire and police departments, which had been provided by Connors Bros., became the responsibility of the village. Connors Bros. retained control of the village's water supply, which comes from wells that also serve the company's industrial needs.

In 1982 Connors Bros. sold its company-owned houses, with the tenants being given the opportunity to buy them. In 1992 the company sold the village's only building supply store and grocery store to new owners.

On 1 January 2023, Blacks Harbour amalgamated with St. George and all or part of five local service districts to form the new incorporated rural community of Eastern Charlotte.

== Transportation ==
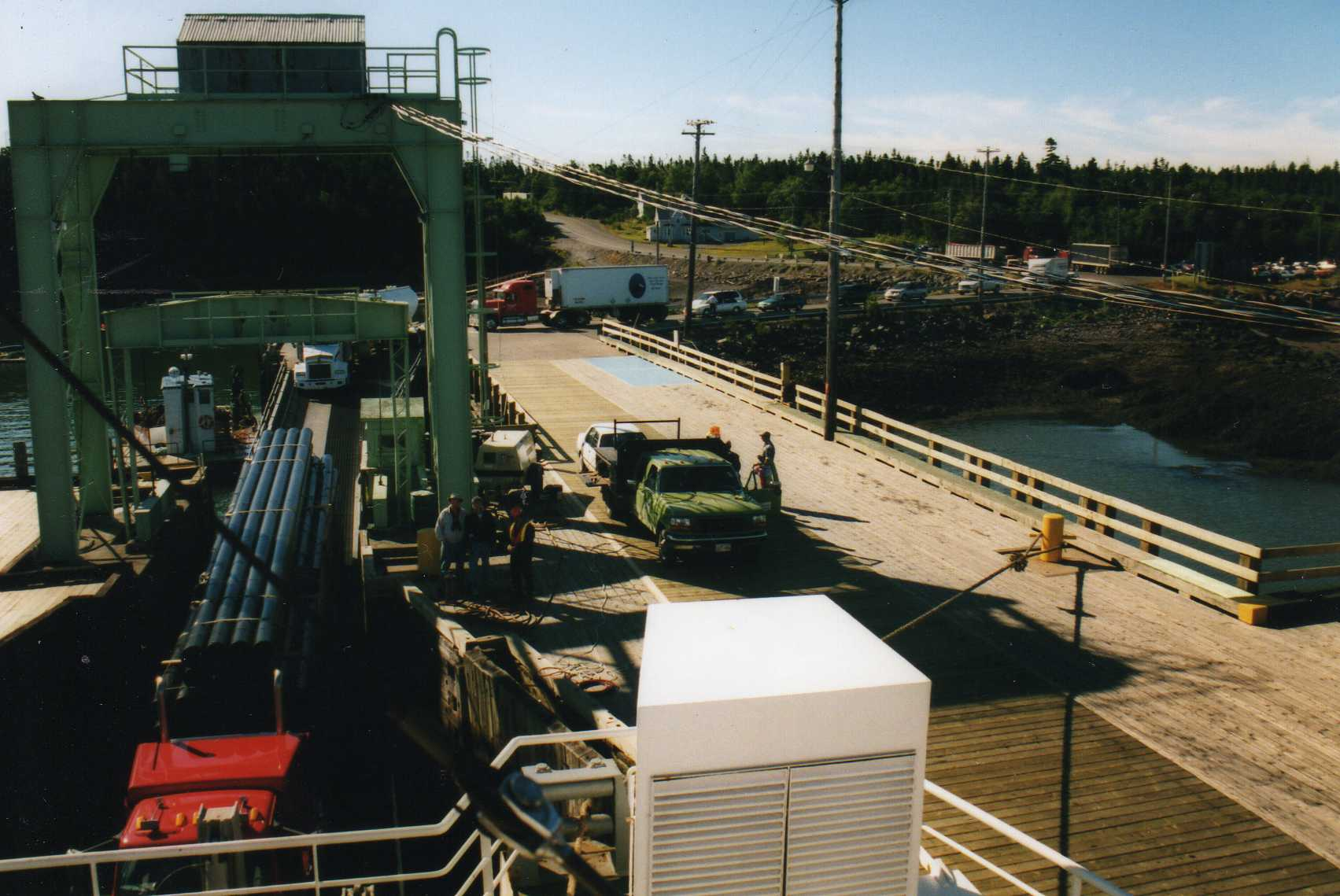
Vehicles boarding the ferry in Blacks Harbour to Grand Manan Island (2002)

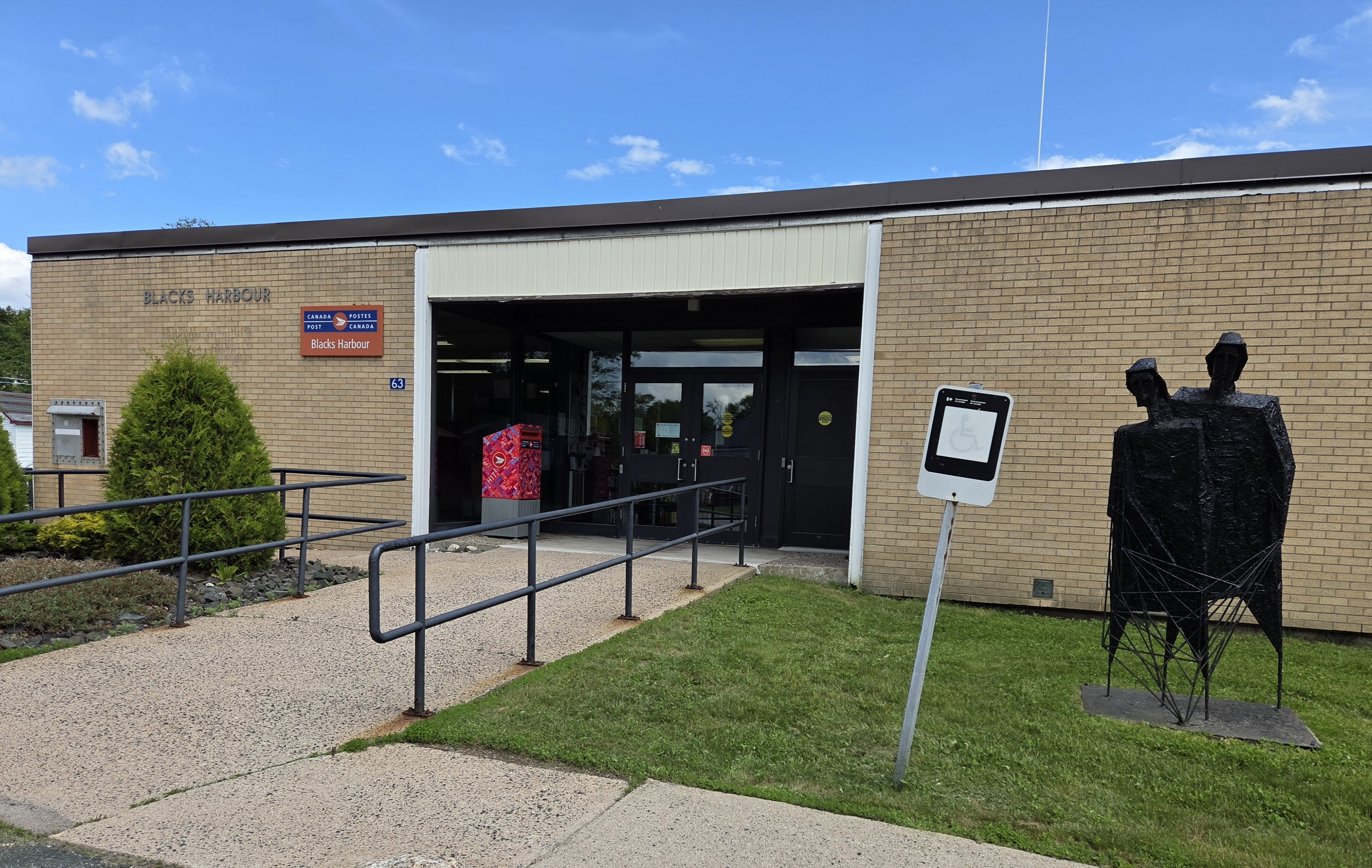
The Blacks Harbour post office in 2026 with Fishermen's Monument by Claude Roussel

Blacks Harbour is the northern terminus for the year-round ferry to Grand Manan operated by Coastal Transport. This service began on 30 May 1966. Previously the crossing from the mainland to Grand Manan had been from Saint Andrews, New Brunswick.

== The federal building ==
In 1968 a new building was built to accommodate the federal fisheries department and the Blacks Harbour post office. The Canadian Department of Public Works commissioned New Brunswick sculptor Claude Roussel to create a fishermen's monument. He used iron rods soldered together to produce a sculpture representing two fishermen and a net. The sculpture, which is over seven feet tall and painted black, is sited in front of the post office, which still occupies the building as of 2026.

== Demographics ==
Historical Census Data - Blacks Harbour, New Brunswick
Year	Pop.	±%
1991	1,139	—
1996	1,148	+0.8%
2001	1,082	−5.7%
2006	952	−12.0%
2011	982	+3.2%
2016	894	−9.0%
2021	907	+1.5%

In the 2021 Canadian census, Blacks Harbour had a population of 907 living in 385 of its 421 total private dwellings, a change of 1.5% from its 2016 population of 894. With a land area of 9.02 km^{2} (3.48 sq mi), it had a population density of 100.6/km^{2} (260.4/sq mi) in 2021.

Canada census – Blacks Harbour community profile

	2021	2011
Population	907 (+1.5% from 2016)	982 (+3.2% from 2006)
Land area	9.02 km^{2} (3.48 sq mi)	8.90 km^{2} (3.44 sq mi)
Population density	100.6/km^{2} (261/sq mi)	110.3/km^{2} (286/sq mi)
Median age	45.6 (M: 44.4, F: 46.8)	42.5 (M: 40.2, F: 45.0)
Private dwellings	421 (total) 385 (occupied)	417 (total)
Median household income	$60,000	$43,367

References: 2021 2011

=== Language ===
Canada Census Mother Tongue - Blacks Harbour, New Brunswick
Census	Total	English			French			English & French			Other		
Year	Responses	Count	Trend	Pop %	Count	Trend	Pop %	Count	Trend	Pop %	Count	Trend	Pop %
2011	950	850	▲1.8%	89.47%	65	▼18.7%	6.84%	5	▲ n/a%	0.53%	30	▲100.0%	3.16%
2006	930	835	▼13.5%	89.79%	80	▼20.0%	8.60%	0	0.0%	0.00%	15	▲ n/a%	1.61%
2001	1,065	965	▼1.0%	90.61%	100	▼4.8%	9.39%	0	▼100.0%	0.00%	0	▼100.0%	0.00%
1996	1,135	975	n/a	85.90%	105	n/a	9.25%	10	n/a	0.88%	45	n/a	3.96%
