= New Brunswick Route 172 =

Highway in New Brunswick, Canada

Route 172

Route information
- Maintained by New Brunswick Department of Transportation
- Length: 16.40 km (10.19 mi)
- Existed: 2001–present

Major junctions
- North end: Route 1 / Route 780 in Upper Letang
- Route 770 in St. George
- South end: Route 772 / Deer Island ferry landing in L'Etete

Location
- Country: Canada
- Province: New Brunswick
- Major cities: St. George

Highway system
- Provincial highways in New Brunswick; Former routes
← Route 170	→ Route 175

Route 172 is a 16 km (9.9 mi)-long mostly north–south secondary highway in southwest New Brunswick, Canada.

== Route description ==
The route's northern terminus is at the intersection of Route 780 and Route 1 (exit 56) in Upper Letang, New Brunswick. The road is a continuation of Poor House Hill Road and is also known as Mt. Pleasant Road. From there, it runs west to the community of St. George and passes the Magaguadavic Basin. From there, the highway goes south through a mostly forested area before passing the west shore of Scotch Bay. Route 172 continues to the community of L'Etang.

The road continues southwest past Browns Cove and Spragues Cove before arriving in the community of Back Bay next to the Bay of Fundy. In Back Bay, the route takes a sharp turn heading west towards the small community of L'Etete. It L'Etele, Route 172 takes a sharp turn south past Matthews Cove and finally the route heads west to the Deer Island Ferry to Deer Island. On Deer Island, the continuation of Route 172 is numbered 772.
