= New Brunswick Route 778 =

Highway in New Brunswick, Canada

Coordinates: 45.062124°N 66.740913°W

Route 778

Route information
- Maintained by New Brunswick Department of Transportation
- Length: 11 km (6.8 mi)

Major junctions
- East end: Route 176 in Pennfield
- West end: Route 176 in Blacks Harbour

Location
- Country: Canada
- Province: New Brunswick

Highway system
- Provincial highways in New Brunswick; Former routes
| ← Route 776 | → Route 780 |

Route 778 is a 10.8-kilometre (6.7 mi) long north to south secondary highway in the southeastern portion of New Brunswick, Canada.

== Route description ==
The route is in Charlotte County.

The route's northern terminus is in Pennfield at Route 176, where it travels southeast through a mostly wooded area past Woodland Cove and Beaver Harbour to Beaver Harbour. From here, the route is known as Deadmans Harbour Rd. The route passes Moose Island as it passes through Deadmans Harbour, and it ends in the community of Blacks Harbour at Route 176.
