= Saint George Parish, New Brunswick =

Coordinates: 45.221952°N 66.852837°W

Saint George St. George
- Parish
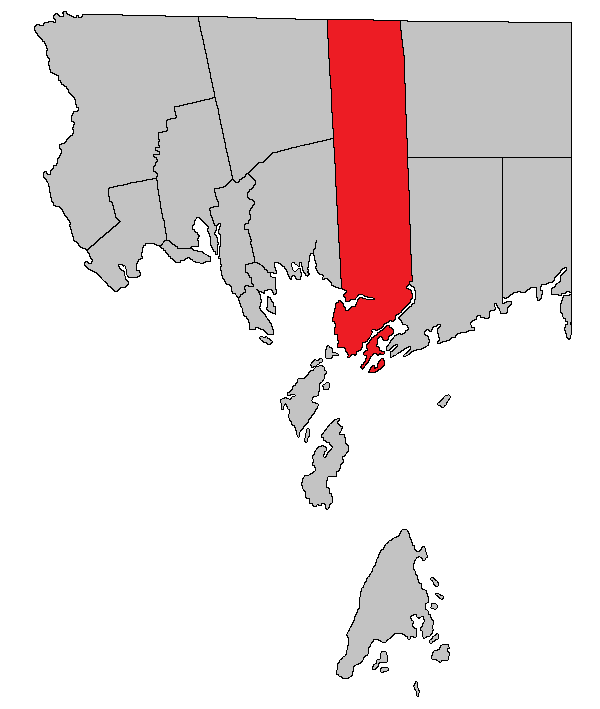
- Location within Charlotte County.
- Country: Canada
- Province: New Brunswick
- County: Charlotte County
- Erected: 1786

Area
  - Land: 500.05 km^{2} (193.07 sq mi)

Population (2021)
  - Total: 2,495
  - Density: 5/km^{2} (13/sq mi)
  - Change 2016-2021: ▲6.6%
  - Dwellings: 1,224
- Time zone: UTC-4 (AST)
  - Summer (DST): UTC-3 (ADT)
- Figures do not include portion within the town of St. George

Saint George is a geographic parish in Charlotte County, New Brunswick, Canada, (Note: The Territorial Division Act divides the province into 152 parishes, the cities of Saint John and Fredericton, and one town of Grand Falls. The Interpretation Act clarifies that parishes include any local government within their borders.) located between St. Stephen and Saint John.

For governance purposes, the southern part of the parish is part of the incorporated rural community of Eastern Charlotte, while the north and the Red Rock Road area are part of the Southwest rural district, both of which are members of the Southwest New Brunswick Service Commission.

Prior to the 2023 governance reform, it comprised one town and two local service districts (LSDs), all of which were members of the Southwest New Brunswick Service Commission (SNBSC).

The Census subdivision of the same name includes all of the parish except St. George.

== Origin of name ==
Historian William Francis Ganong believed the name suggested by other Saint names in the area.

Five of the original six mainland parishes of Charlotte County used names of major saints recognised by the Church of England: Andrew (Scotland), David (Wales), George (England), Patrick (Ireland), and Stephen.

== History ==
Saint George was erected in 1786 as one of the original parishes of Charlotte County.

== Boundaries ==
Saint George Parish is bounded:

- on the north by the York County line;
- on the east by a line beginning on the prolongation of the eastern line of grants crossing Lake Utopia then running southerly along the prolongation and the grants to the Letang River, then down the river and through Letang Harbour, passing east of Hills Island, to the Bay of Fundy;
- on the south by the Bay of Fundy, the Letete Passage, and Passamaquoddy Bay;
- on the west by a line beginning near the western end of Shore Road on the prolongation of the western line of a tier of grants along the Magaguadavic River, then running north along the western line of the tier and its prolongation to York County.

=== Evolution of boundaries ===
The southern line of the Cape Ann Association grant in Saint David Parish was prolonged eastward to the Saint John County to provide the northern line of all parishes in the eastern part of Charlotte County; in Saint George's case the line cut through McDougall Lake. The western line of the parish was the same; the eastern line ran along the eastern side of the Letang River, Letang Harbour, putting all the islands in them in Saint George; the southern boundary extended to include all islands within 2 miles (3.2 km) of the coast, including islands that are now part of West Isles Parish. The eastern line diverted around a grant on the Letang River that's mostly in Pennfield Parish along Route 785.

In 1814 the parish was extended north to the county line.

In 1850 the eastern line was extended south to the Letang River, taking part of Pennfield Parish; the Letang boundary was reworded, implying that the western shore was the new boundary of Saint George.

In 1877 the water boundaries of Saint George were altered and clarified, now running through the channel of Letang River and Harbour, then west through Letete Passage, transferring several islands to West Isles Parish.

== Former governance units ==
=== Municipality ===
St. George is located at the bend of the Magaguadavic River south of Route 1.

=== Local service districts ===
Both LSDs assessed for the basic LSD services of fire protection, police services, land use planning, emergency measures, and dog control.

==== Saint George Parish ====
The local service district of the parish of Saint George originally included all of the parish outside St. George.

The LSD was established in 1970 to assess for fire protection. First aid & ambulance services were added in 1975 and community services to the Bonny River-Second Falls service area in 1991.

In 2022, the LSD assessed for only basic services. The taxing authorities were 515.00 Saint George and 515.01 Bonny River-Second Falls.

===== Bonny River-Second Falls =====
Bonny River-Second Falls took in an area west of the Magaguadavic River from the parish line south almost to the Old St. Andrews Road and grants east of the river from the Red Rock Road to The Canal. It formerly had enhanced services and was sometimes inaccurately described as an LSD in its own right.

==== Fundy Bay ====
Fundy Bay comprised the mainland south of Route 1 and St. George.

The LSD was established in 1978 to add recreational facilities.

In 2022, the LSD additionally assessed for community & recreation services. The taxing authority was 525.00 Fundy Bay.

== Communities ==
Communities at least partly within the parish. bold indicates an incorporated municipality; italics indicate a name no longer in official use

- Back Bay
- Bonny River
- Breadalbane
- Caithness
- Canal
- Elmcroft
- Greens Point
- Lee Settlement
- Letang
- Letete
- Mascarene
- Pomeroy
- **St. George**
- Second Falls
- Upper Letang
- Utopia

== Bodies of water ==
Bodies of water (Note: Not including brooks, ponds or coves.) at least partly within the parish.

- Bonny River
- Letang River
- Magaguadavic River
- Lake Stream
- Linton Stream
- Piskahegan Stream
- Red Rock Stream
- Trout Lake Stream
- Addies Creek
- Lelands Creek
- McDougall Outlet
- The Canal
- Hinds Bay
- Lime Kiln Bay
- Passamaquoddy Bay
- Scotch Bay
- Bliss Harbour
- Letang Harbour
- Magaguadavic Basin
- Letete Passage
- Lake Utopia
- more than a dozen other officially named lakes

== Islands ==
Islands at least partly within the parish.

- Bar Island
- Big Island
- Bliss Island
- Cailiff Island (also called Frye's Island)
- Cannonball Island
- Cooks Island
- Crow Island
- Douglas Island
- Eagle Island
- Flea Island
- Fox Island
- Grassy Islands
- Hills Island
- Hog Island
- Howards Island
- Hoyt Island
- Hoyt Nub
- Jail Island
- Long Island
- Man of War Island
- McGraws Island
- Mink Island
- Morans Island
- Park Islands
- Spruce Island
- Thumb Island
- Tub Island
- Turnover Island
- Vernon Island

== Other notable places ==
Parks, historic sites, and other noteworthy places at least partly within the parish.

- Magaguadavic Protected Natural Area
- Utopia Game Refuge

== Demographics ==
Parish population total does not include incorporated town of St. George

=== Population ===
Canada census – Saint George community profile

	2021	2016	2011
Population	2,495 (+6.6% from 2016)	2,341 (-5.3% from 2011)	2,472 (-0.2% from 2006)
Land area	500.05 km^{2} (193.07 sq mi)	500.23 km^{2} (193.14 sq mi)	499.76 km^{2} (192.96 sq mi)
Population density	5/km^{2} (13/sq mi)	4.7/km^{2} (12/sq mi)	4.9/km^{2} (13/sq mi)
Median age	46.8 (M: 48, F: 46.4)	46.3 (M: 46.2, F: 46.4)	45.1 (M: 45.1, F: 45.1)
Private dwellings	1,050 (total)	1,254 (total)	1,196 (total)
Median household income		$62,123	$50,205

References: 2021 2016 2011

Historical census data - Saint George Parish, New Brunswick

Year	Pop.	±%
1991	2,207	—
1996	2,357	+6.8%
2001	2,350	−0.3%

Year	Pop.	±%
2006	2,476	+5.4%
2011	2,472	−0.2%
2016	2,341	−5.3%

Year	Pop.	±%
2021	2,495	+6.6%

=== Language ===
Canada Census mother tongue - Saint George Parish, New Brunswick
Census	Total	English			French			English & French			Other		
Year	Responses	Count	Trend	Pop %	Count	Trend	Pop %	Count	Trend	Pop %	Count	Trend	Pop %
2011	2,470	2,390	▼0.2%	96.76%	30	▼14.3%	1.21%	10	▲ n/a%	0.40%	40	▲12.5%	1.62%
2006	2,465	2,395	▲3.1%	97.16%	35	▲71.4%	1.42%	0	0.0%	0.00%	35	▲71.4%	1.42%
2001	2,340	2,320	▲1.1%	99.15%	10	▼33.3%	0.43%	0	0.0%	0.00%	10	▼75.0%	0.43%
1996	2,350	2,295	n/a	97.66%	15	n/a	0.64%	0	n/a	0.00%	40	n/a	1.70%

== Access routes ==
Highways and numbered routes that run through the parish, including external routes that start or finish at the parish limits:

- **Highways**
  - Route 1
- **Principal routes**
  - Route 172
- Secondary routes:
  - Route 760
  - Route 770
  - Route 780
  - Route 785
- External routes:
  - L'Etete to Deer Island Ferry

== See also ==
- List of parishes in New Brunswick
