= New Brunswick =

Province of Canada

New Brunswick Nouveau-Brunswick (French)
- Province
- Flag Coat of arms
- Motto(s): Spem reduxit (Latin) "Hope restored"
- Coordinates: 46°30′N 66°00′W
- Country: Canada
- Before confederation: Province of New Brunswick
- Confederation: 1 July 1867 (1st, with Nova Scotia, Ontario, Quebec)
- Capital: Fredericton
- Largest city: Moncton
- Largest metro: Greater Moncton

Government
  - Type: Parliamentary constitutional monarchy
  - Lieutenant Governor: Louise Imbeault
  - Premier: Susan Holt
- Legislature: Legislative Assembly of New Brunswick
- Federal representation: Parliament of Canada
- House seats: 10 of 343 (2.9%)
- Senate seats: 10 of 105 (9.5%)

Area
  - Total: 72,908 km^{2} (28,150 sq mi)
  - Land: 71,450 km^{2} (27,590 sq mi)
  - Water: 1,458 km^{2} (563 sq mi) 2%
  - Rank: 11th
- 0.7% of Canada

Population (2021)
  - Total: 775,610
  - Estimate (Q3 2026): ▲883,522
  - Rank: 8th
  - Density: 10.86/km^{2} (28.1/sq mi)
- Demonyms: New Brunswicker; FR: Néo-Brunswickois(e)
- Official languages: English; French

GDP
  - Rank: 9th
  - Total (2017): CA$36.088 billion
  - Per capita: CA$42,606 (11th)

HDI
  - HDI (2023): 0.914—Very high (10th)
- Time zone: UTC-04:00 (AST)
  - Summer (DST): UTC-03:00 (ADT)
- Canadian postal abbr.: NB
- Postal code prefix: E
- ISO 3166 code: CA-NB
- Flower: Purple violet
- Tree: Balsam fir
- Bird: Black-capped chickadee
- Website: www.gnb.ca
- Rankings include all provinces and territories

New Brunswick (Note: French: Nouveau-Brunswick, pronounced [nuvo bʁœ̃zwik], locally [nuvo bʁɔnzwɪk]) is a province of Canada. It borders Quebec to the northwest, the Gulf of Saint Lawrence to the northeast, Nova Scotia to the east, the Bay of Fundy to the southeast, and the U.S. state of Maine to the southwest. It is part of Eastern Canada and is one of the three Maritime provinces and one of the four Atlantic provinces. The province is about 83% forested and its northern half is occupied by the Appalachians. The province's climate is continental with snowy winters and temperate summers. The province has a surface area of 72,908 square kilometres (28,150 sq mi) and 775,610 inhabitants (2021 census).

Approximately half of the population lives in urban areas, predominantly in Moncton, Saint John, and Fredericton. In 1969, New Brunswick passed the Official Languages Act which began recognizing French as an official language, along with English. New Brunswickers have the right to receive provincial government services in the official language of their choice. About two thirds of the population are English speaking and one third is French speaking. New Brunswick is home to most of the cultural region of Acadia and most Acadians. New Brunswick's variety of French is called Acadian French. There are seven regional accents.

The province lies within the homelands of three First Nations groups: the Mi’kmaq, Wolastoqiyik (Maliseet), and Passamaquoddy. The eastern coast is part of Mi'kma'ki, while Wolastoqiyik and Passamaquoddy territories cover the west. In 1604, Acadia, the first New France colony, was founded with the creation of Port-Royal in southwest Nova Scotia. For a century and half afterwards, Acadia changed hands multiple times due to numerous conflicts between France and the United Kingdom. From 1755 to 1764, the British deported Acadians en masse, an event known as the Great Upheaval. This, along with the Treaty of Paris, solidified Acadia as British property. In 1784, following the arrival of many loyalists fleeing the American Revolution, the colony of New Brunswick was officially created, separating it from what is now Nova Scotia. The following year saw the incorporation of Saint John, the first city in what would become Canada. In the early 1800s, New Brunswick prospered and the population grew rapidly. In 1867, New Brunswick decided to join with Nova Scotia and the Province of Canada (now Quebec and Ontario) to form Canada. After Confederation, shipbuilding and lumbering declined, and protectionism disrupted trade with New England. From the mid-1900s onwards, New Brunswick was one of the poorest regions of Canada, a fact eventually mitigated by transfer payments. However, the province has seen the highest eastward interprovincial migration in 45 years in both rural and urban areas, as people from Ontario and other parts of Canada migrate to the area.

As of 2002, the provincial GDP was derived as follows: services (about half being government services and public administration) 43%; construction, manufacturing, and utilities 24%; real estate rental 12%; wholesale and retail 11%; agriculture, forestry, fishing, hunting, mining, oil and gas extraction 5%; transportation and warehousing 5%. A powerful corporate concentration of large companies in New Brunswick is owned by the Irving Group of Companies. The province's 2019 output was CA$38.236 billion, which is 1.65% of Canada's GDP. Tourism accounts for 9% of the labour force either directly or indirectly. Popular destinations include the Hopewell Rocks, Fundy National Park, Magnetic Hill, Kouchibouguac National Park and Roosevelt Campobello International Park.

== Etymology ==
New Brunswick was named in 1784 in honour of George III, King of Great Britain, King of Ireland, and prince-elector of Brunswick-Lüneburg in the Holy Roman Empire of the German Nation (until 1806) in what is now Germany. Upon its split from Nova Scotia, it was initially named New Ireland in April 1784; however the name of the province was changed to New Brunswick when it was officially brought into existence by an Order in Council in June 1784.

== History ==
=== Indigenous peoples ===
Paleo-Indians are believed to have been the first humans on the land of New Brunswick, settling there roughly 10,000 years ago. Because their descendants did not leave a written record, there is a lack of knowledge of the history of the area before the arrival of European explorers. New Brunswick's land base has historically formed integral parts of the homelands of three First Nations: the Mi’kmaq, Wolastoqiyik, and Passamaquoddy members of the Wabanaki Confederacy. Much of the eastern coast falls within the Mi'kmaw district of Siknikt (Signigtewa'gi) in their country of Mi'kma'ki; the western half of the province is covered by Wolastokuk, the Wolastoqiyik homeland named for the Wolastoq or Saint John River; and Peskotomuhkatik, the Passamaquoddy country, surrounds the Passamaquoddy Bay. Many place names across the province originate from their Eastern Algonquian languages, among them Aroostook, Bouctouche, Mactaquac, Memramcook, Petitcodiac, Quispamsis, Kouchibouguac, Richibucto, Restigouche and Shediac.

=== Acadia and Nova Scotia (1604–1784) ===
The first documented European exploration of New Brunswick was made by Jacques Cartier in 1534, when his party landed on Miscou and explored the coasts of Chaleur Bay. They made contact with aboriginals, who from this point on began to trade with Europeans. This also exposed them to Old World diseases. Acadia, a colonial division of New France covering the Maritimes, was founded in 1604 by Samuel de Champlain and Pierre Dugua de Mons with a settlement on Saint Croix Island. It was quickly abandoned due to difficult living conditions and moved to Acadia's capital, Port-Royal. There, the Mi'kmaq helped the French survive. In 1626, Port-Royal was destroyed by the British. The British conquered Acadia shortly after and held it until 1629. James VI and I, King of Scotland, renamed it "Nova Scotia" in English.

The Mi'kmaq helped all French survivors, including Charles de Saint-Étienne de la Tour. Together, they established a fur trade network along the Saint John River. With the onset of the Anglo-French War (1627–1629), de la Tour was issued a charter to govern Acadia. In 1629, Acadia was officially returned to France. As such, a new wave of French settlers arrived in Port-Royal to revitalise the colony, including Isaac de Razilly, a new governor of Acadia, and Charles de Menou d'Aulnay, his cousin. de Razilly and de la Tour's charters conflicted with each others', but the two maintained an amicable relationship. In 1635, de Razilly died, triggering tensions between de la Tour, who governed from the Saint John valley, and d'Aulnay, who governed from Port-Royal. In the 1630s, this erupted into the Acadian Civil War. d'Aulnay managed to expel de la Tour in 1644. But, following d'Aulnay's death in 1650, de la Tour married his widow in 1653, essentially overturning his success.

Over time, French settlement extended up the river to the site of present-day Fredericton. Other settlements in the southeast extended from Beaubassin, near the present-day border with Nova Scotia, to Baie Verte, and up the Petitcodiac, Memramcook, and Shepody Rivers. The descendants of Acadia's French colonists became the Acadians. Acadians developed a unique society characterised by dyking technology, which allowed them to cultivate marshes left by the Bay of Fundy's tides, and by tightly knit independent communities, because they were often neglected by French authorities.

During the 1690s, in King William's War, attacks were launched from the Saint John valley by Acadian militias onto New England colonists. This would create a deep English hostility against the French presence in the region.

From the 1600s to mid-1700s, Acadia was routinely a war zone between the French and the English and would often change hands. However, Acadia would definitively fall into British hands following Queen Anne's War, a conquest of most of the Acadian peninsula, formalized by the Treaty of Utrecht of 1713. After the war, Acadia was reduced to Île Saint-Jean (Prince Edward Island) and Île-Royale (Cape Breton Island), with the ownership of continental Acadia (New Brunswick) being disputed between France and Britain, with an informal border on the Isthmus of Chignecto. In an effort to limit British expansion into continental Acadia, the French built Fort Beauséjour at the isthmus in 1751.

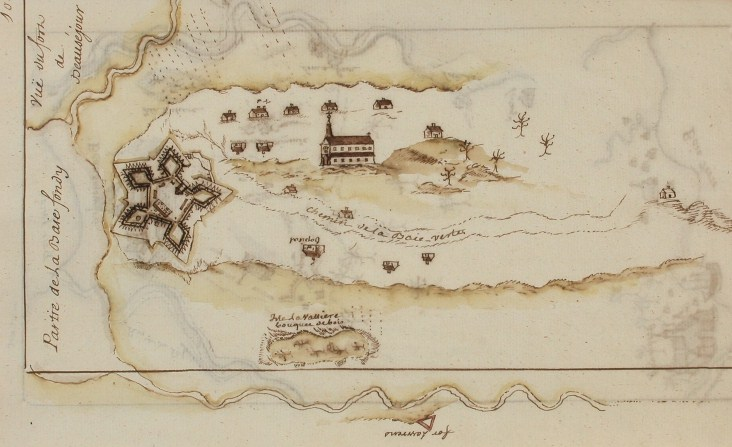
Fort Beauséjour at the Isthmus of Chignecto. The French built the fort in 1751 in an effort to limit British expansion into continental Acadia.

From 1749 to 1755, during Father Le Loutre's War, British soldiers fought the Acadians and Mi'kmaq to consolidate their power over Acadia/Nova Scotia. In June 1755 the British captured Fort Beauséjour, severing the Acadian supply lines to Nova Scotia, and Île-Royale. Continental Acadia thus came to be incorporated into the British colony of Nova Scotia with the Treaty of Paris in 1763. Following this, the British, unsatisfied with the Acadians' surrender because they refused to pledge allegiance, turned to capturing and exporting Acadians en masse, an ethnic cleansing event known as the Deportation of the Acadians which was ordered by Robert Monckton. From 1755 to 1763, 12,000 Acadians out of 18,000 were forcefully deported to various locations around the world, though 8000 died before arrival. The remaining 6000 Acadians escaped the British by fleeing North to the present Acadia, or to Canada. From 1755 to 1757, most Acadians were deported to the Thirteen Colonies. From 1758 to 1762, most were sent to France. Between 1763 and 1785, many deported Acadians relocated to join their compatriots in Louisiana. Their descendants became Cajuns. In the 1780s and 1790s, some Acadians returned to Acadia, and discovered several thousand English immigrants, mostly from New England, on their former lands.

In the late 18th century, the British began to make efforts to colonise the region, mostly by importing colonists from New England. Before the American Revolution, these colonists were called planters. After the revolution, new colonists were called loyalists, because only those loyal to the British crown settled in Nova Scotia. In 1766, planters from Pennsylvania founded The Bend of the Petitcodiac, or simply The Bend, which later became Moncton in 1855, and English settlers from Yorkshire arrived in the Sackville area. In the 1770s, 10,000 loyalists settled along the north shore of the Bay of Fundy. In 1783, both Saint Andrews and Saint John were founded.

=== British colony of New Brunswick (1784–1867) ===
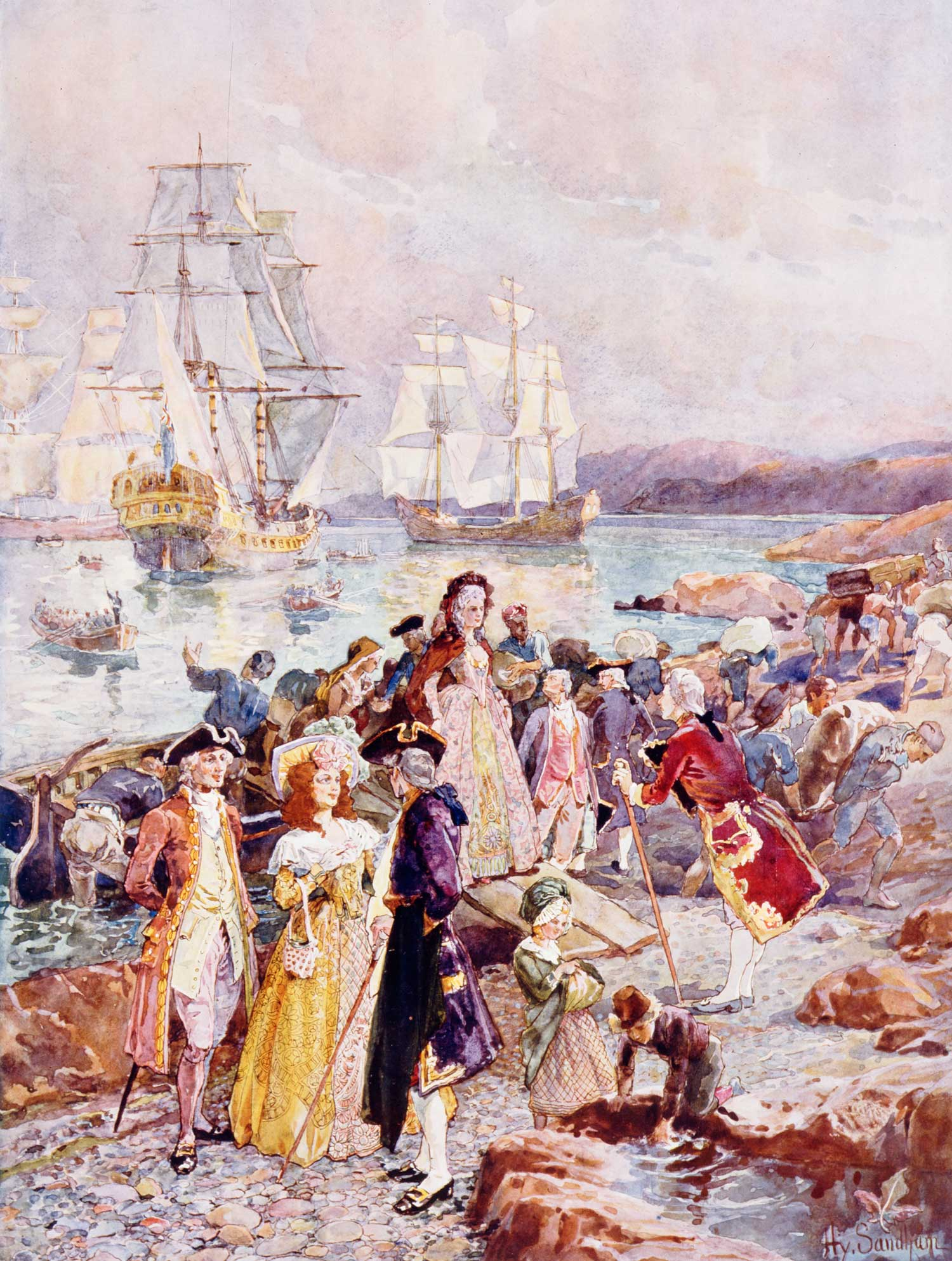
A romanticized depiction of the arrival of the Loyalists in New Brunswick

Loyalists who received land allocations around the St. John River valley, the Bay of Fundy or the Northumberland Strait became dissatisfied with being governed from Halifax because it was so far away. Therefore, on 18 June 1784, the British government created a new province for them: New Brunswick. New Brunswick was formed from the partition of Sunbury County from the remainder of Nova Scotia. In that same year, New Brunswick formed its first elected assembly. The first governor was Thomas Carleton, and, in 1785, he chose the hamlet of Sainte-Anne as the provincial capital. Sainte-Anne was later renamed Frederick's Town (and then later Fredericton) after the second son of George III.

In total, it is believed that around 14,000 loyalist refugees came to New Brunswick. However, 10% eventually returned to the United States. In 1785, Saint John became New Brunswick's first incorporated city.

Economically, New Brunswick was a poor environment for agriculture and mining. Its fishery was also far inferior to that of Nova Scotia's. New Brunswick's forests were rich in wood, but as wood is a bulky and low-value commodity, accessible markets were limited. Essentially, in the late 1700s, New Brunswick was a peripheral corner of the British Empire and North American world. Geopolitical events in Europe would change this situation. In 1806, Napoleon Bonaparte's continental blockade forced the United Kingdom, which usually relied on the Baltic Sea for supplies, to import timber from its North American colonies. This stimulated the lumber trade in New Brunswick, as well as in Lower Canada.

Between 1805 and 1812, New Brunswick annually exported 100,000 tons of squared timber. In 1819, the number exceeded 240,000 tons, and in 1825 exports reached their highest level at 417,000 tons. This also resulted in the emergence of a shipbuilding market. These industries were then bolstered by the Canadian–American Reciprocity Treaty of 1854, and demand from the American Civil War of 1861 to 1865. St. Martins became the third most productive shipbuilding town in the Maritimes and produced over 500 vessels.

From 1800 to 1851, New Brunswick's population grew from 25,000 to 200,000, and it saw large-scale immigration from Ireland and Scotland. In 1848, responsible home government was granted. The 1850s saw the emergence of political parties largely organized along religious and ethnic lines.

From the late 1700s to mid 1800s, Acadians became a minority, and they lived largely on the fringes of society, fearful of the English. They were mostly illiterate due to laws preventing them from opening schools. They were also not part of the economic boom, and had troubles asserting their land rights.

During the 1860s, the notion of unifying the maritime colonies of British North America was being increasingly discussed. This was due to multiple factors. For example, some felt that the American Civil War was the result of a weak central government and wished to avoid the same fate. Some also wanted to increase trade between the colonies, and be less economically tied to the US. In 1864, the Charlottetown Conference was held to discuss a possible Maritime Union between Nova Scotia, New Brunswick and Prince Edward Island. However, the Province of Canada, caught wind of the conference and decided to send representatives to attend. They asked that the agenda be expanded to discuss a union that would also include them.

In 1866, the United States cancelled the Reciprocity Treaty, leading to a loss of trade and a stronger desire to build up trade within British North America. A Fenian raid in 1866 also increased public support for a potential union.

=== Confederation to the Second World War (1867–1945) ===
On 1 July 1867, New Brunswick joined with Nova Scotia and the Province of Canada (now Ontario and Quebec) to create the Dominion of Canada.

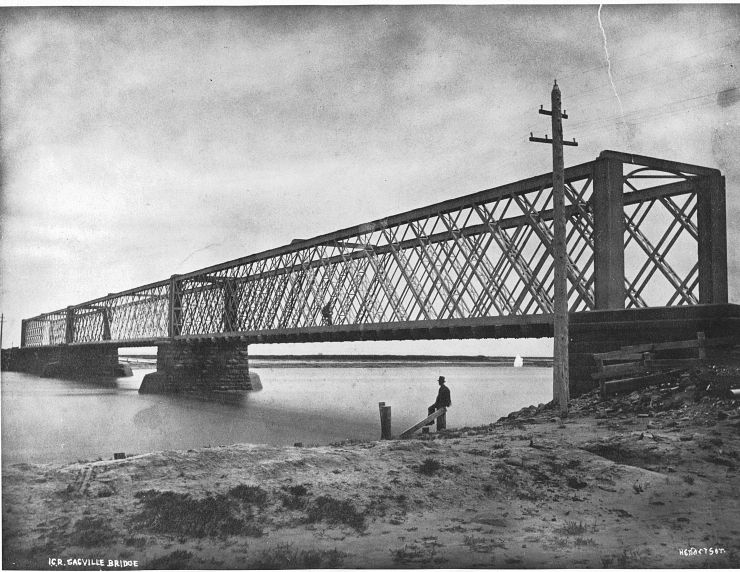
An Intercolonial Railway bridge, 1875. The railway was established as a result of Confederation.

Though Confederation brought into existence the Intercolonial Railway in 1872, new barriers undermined traditional trade relations. In 1879, John A. Macdonald's Conservatives enacted the National Policy, which called for high tariffs and opposed free trade, disrupting the trading relationship between the Maritimes and New England. The economic situation was worsened by the Great Fire of Saint John of 1877, the decline of the shipbuilding industry, and the US Panic of 1893. Many experienced workers lost their jobs and had to move west or to the United States.

In 1871, the government introduced free education, banning catechism, the cassock and French in public schools in the process. Though contested by the Acadians and the Irish, the law was deemed constitutional. Following a riot in Caraquet in 1875, and political pressure, the bans were lifted in 1877.

The Irving Group of Companies, founded by the Irving family, officially began in 1881 in Bouctouche when James Irving bought a sawmill. Afterwards, the family continued to acquire businesses and substantial wealth, eventually becoming the richest family in the province. Today, Irving is considered by many to exert a monopoly over New Brunswick.

Towards the early 20th century, the economy began to improve somewhat. The railways and tariffs fostered the growth of new industries in the province such as textile manufacturing, iron mills, pulp and paper mills, and sugar refineries. However, many of these eventually failed to compete with their competition in Central Canada. Unemployment was high for a long time and increased during the Great Depression of the 1930s.

By the end of the Great Depression, the New Brunswick standard of living was much lower than the Canadian average. In 1937, New Brunswick had the highest infant mortality and illiteracy rates in Canada. In 1940, the Rowell–Sirois Commission reported grave flaws in the Canadian constitution. While the federal government had most of the revenue gathering powers, the provinces had many expenditure responsibilities such as healthcare, education, and welfare, which were becoming increasingly expensive. The Commission recommended the creation of equalization payments, which were eventually implemented in 1957.

After Canada joined World War II, 14 NB army units were organized, in addition to The Royal New Brunswick Regiment, and first deployed in the Italian campaign in 1943. After the Normandy landings they redeployed to northwestern Europe, along with The North Shore Regiment. The British Commonwealth Air Training Plan, a training program for ally pilots, established bases in Moncton, Chatham, and Pennfield Ridge, as well as a military typing school in Saint John. While relatively unindustrialized before the war, New Brunswick became home to 34 plants on military contracts from which the province received over $78 million. Prime Minister William Lyon Mackenzie King, who had promised no conscription, asked the provinces if they would release the government of said promise. New Brunswick voted 69.1% yes. The policy was not implemented until 1944, too late for many of the conscripts to be deployed. There were 1808 NB fatalities among the armed forces.

=== Postwar and contemporary New Brunswick (1945–present) ===
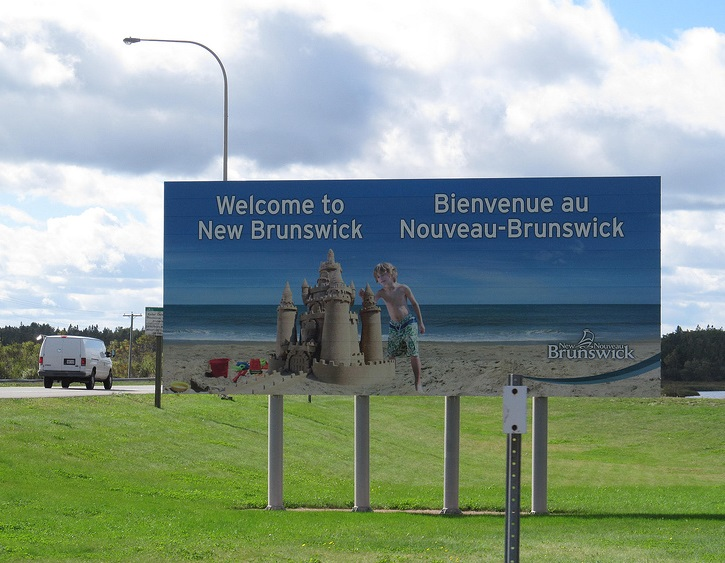
A provincial welcome sign in English and French, the two official languages of the province

Acadians in northern New Brunswick had long been geographically and linguistically isolated from the more numerous English speakers to the south. The population of French origin grew dramatically after Confederation, from about 16 per cent in 1871 to 34 per cent in 1931. Government services were often not available in French, and the infrastructure in Francophone areas was less developed than elsewhere. In 1960 Premier Louis Robichaud embarked on the New Brunswick Equal Opportunity program, in which education, rural road maintenance, and healthcare fell under the sole jurisdiction of a provincial government that insisted on equal coverage throughout the province, rather than the former county-based system. In 1969 the Robichaud government adopted the Official Languages Act making the province officially bilingual and establishing the right of New Brunswickers to obtain provincial government services in the official language of their choice. In 1982 at the request of the government of Richard Hatfield, this right became part of the Canadian Charter of Rights and Freedoms and therefore part of the Constitution of Canada.

Liberal Frank McKenna ended Hatfield's 17 years in office in the 1987 election, winning all 58 seats in the legislature; this is only one of two provincial clean sweeps in Canadian history.

In 2005, the Court of Queen's Bench approved a ruling allowing for the legalization of same-sex marriage.

In 2013, protests were led by members of Elsipogtog First Nation against shale gas exploration in Kent County and culminated on October 17 in a confrontation with the RCMP near Rexton, in which 40 people were arrested and several police vehicles were burned. A civilian review commission later reported on the RCMP's handling of the protests. The province placed a moratorium on hydraulic fracturing a year after the protests.

At the beginning of 2023, the provincial government implemented a local governance reform, reducing the number of entities from 340 to 89. In the 2024 election, Susan Holt's Liberals defeated the Progressive Conservative government of Blaine Higgs, and Holt became the province's first woman premier.

== Geography ==
Topographic map

Roughly square, New Brunswick is bordered on the north by Quebec, on the east by the Gulf of St. Lawrence, on the south by the Bay of Fundy, and on the west by the US state of Maine. The southeast corner of the province is connected to Nova Scotia at the isthmus of Chignecto.

Glaciation has left much of New Brunswick's uplands with only shallow, acidic soils which have discouraged settlement but which are home to enormous forests.

=== Climate ===
Köppen climate types of New Brunswick

New Brunswick's climate is more severe than that of the other Maritime provinces, which are lower and have more shoreline along the moderating sea. New Brunswick has a humid continental climate, with slightly milder winters on the Gulf of St. Lawrence coastline. Elevated parts of the far north of the province have a subarctic climate.

Evidence of climate change in New Brunswick can be seen in its more intense precipitation events, more frequent winter thaws, and one quarter to half the amount of snowpack. Today, the sea level is about 30 cm (1 ft) higher than it was 100 years ago, and it is expected to rise twice that much again by the year 2100.

=== Flora and fauna ===
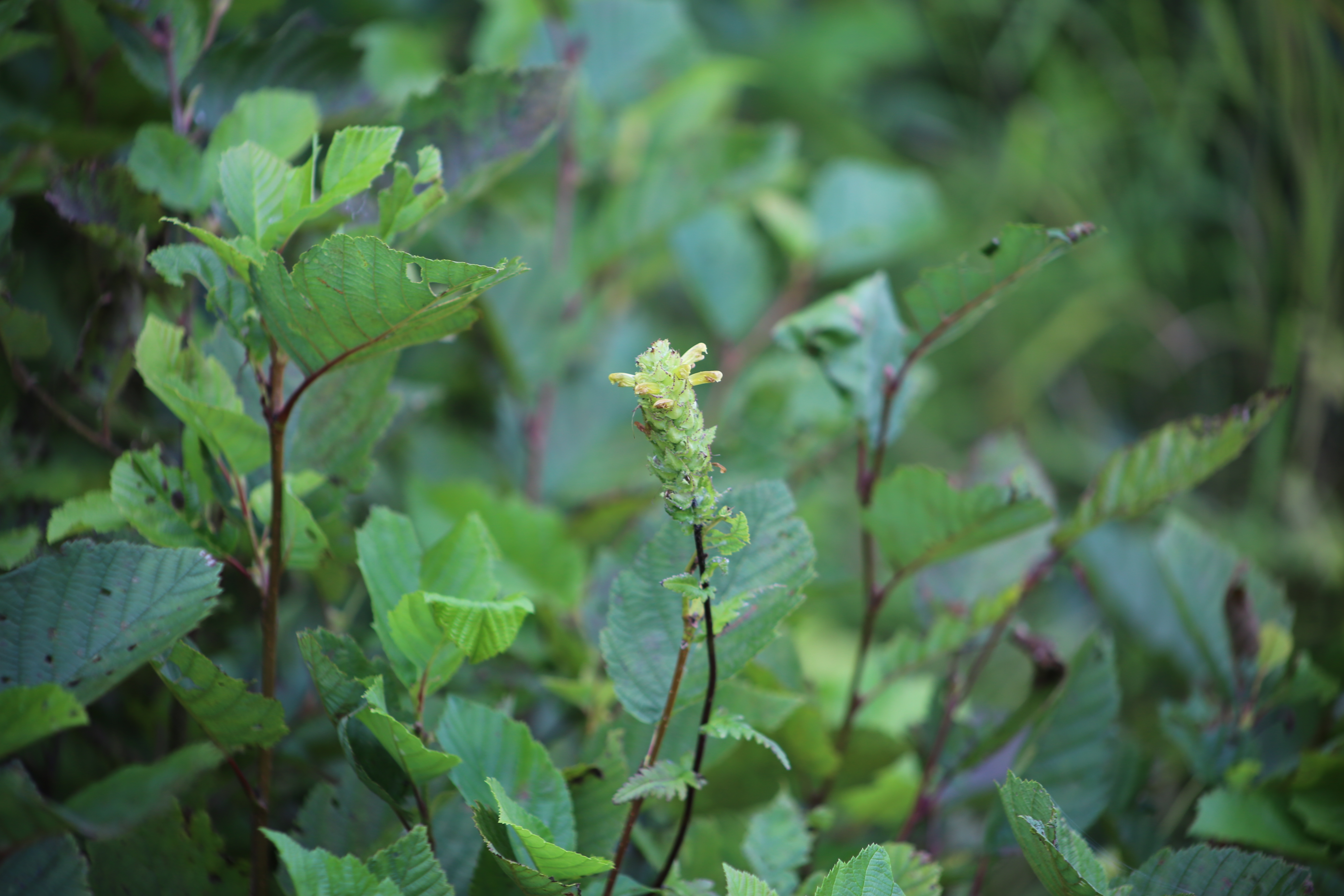
Furbish's lousewort is a herb endemic to the shores of the upper Saint John River.

Most of New Brunswick is forested with secondary forest or tertiary forest. At the start of European settlement, the Maritimes were covered from coast to coast by a forest of mature trees, giants by today's standards. Today less than one per cent of old-growth Acadian forest remains, and the World Wide Fund for Nature lists the Acadian Forest as endangered. Following the frequent large scale disturbances caused by settlement and timber harvesting, the Acadian forest is not growing back as it was, but is subject to borealization. This means that exposure-resistant species that are well adapted to the frequent large-scale disturbances common in the boreal forest are increasingly abundant. These include jack pine, balsam fir, black spruce, white birch, and poplar. Forest ecosystems support large carnivores such as the bobcat, Canada lynx, and black bear, and the large herbivores moose and white-tailed deer.

Fiddlehead greens are harvested from the Ostrich fern which grows on riverbanks. Furbish's lousewort, a perennial herb endemic to the shores of the upper Saint John River, is an endangered species threatened by habitat destruction, riverside development, forestry, littering and recreational use of the riverbank. Many wetlands are being disrupted by the introduced and highly invasive purple loosestrife.

The deer population in the province has dropped by 70% since 1985. The widespread use of glyphosate may have contributed to this.

Since 2014, the New Brunswick government has allowed forestry companies to harvest 20 percent more wood there than before.

=== Protected areas ===
New Brunswick has two national parks, Fundy and Kouchibouguac, and several provincial parks; the largest provincial park, Mount Carleton, was proclaimed in 1970 and covers about 174 km^{2} (67 sq mi). The Fundy Biosphere Reserve, designated by UNESCO in 2007, covers more than 430,000 hectares of the upper Bay of Fundy coast, and the province also protects land through Protected Natural Areas.

=== Geology ===
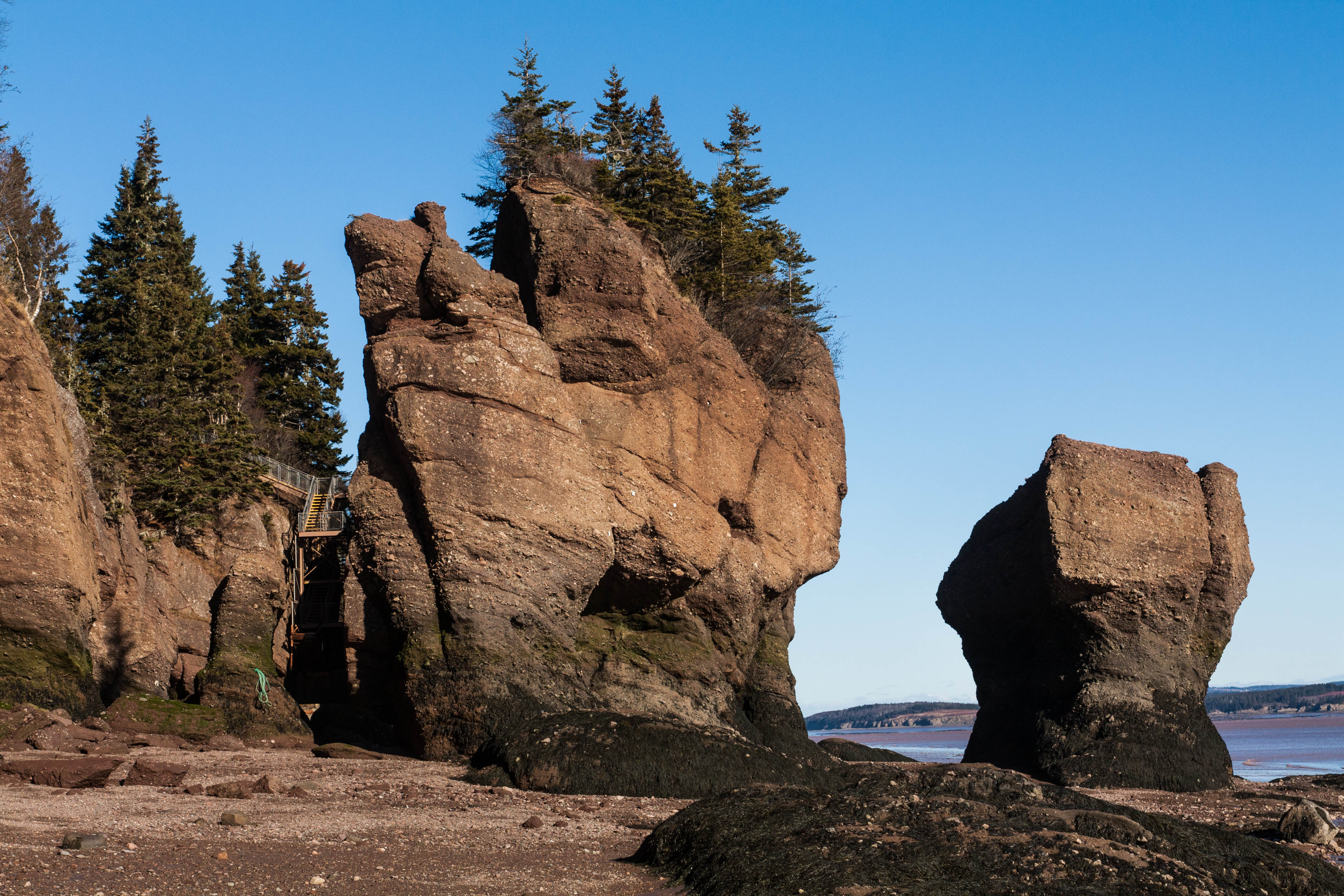
The Hopewell Rocks are rock formations located at the upper reaches of the Bay of Fundy, near Hopewell Cape.

Bedrock types range from 1 billion to 200 million years old. Much of the bedrock in the west and north derives from ocean deposits in the Ordovician that were subject to folding and igneous intrusion and that were eventually covered with lava during the Paleozoic, peaking during the Acadian orogeny.

During the Carboniferous period, about 340 million years ago, New Brunswick was in the Maritimes Basin, a sedimentary basin near the equator. Sediments, brought by rivers from surrounding highlands, accumulated there; after being compressed, they produced the Albert oil shales of southern New Brunswick. Eventually, sea water from the Panthalassic Ocean invaded the basin, forming the Windsor Sea. Once this receded, conglomerates, sandstones, and shales accumulated. The rust colour of these was caused by the oxidation of iron in the beds between wet and dry periods. Such late Carboniferous rock formed the Hopewell Rocks, which have been shaped by the extreme tidal range of the Bay of Fundy.

In the early Triassic, as Pangea drifted north it was rent apart, forming the rift valley that is the Bay of Fundy. Magma pushed up through the cracks, forming basalt columns on Grand Manan.

=== Topography ===
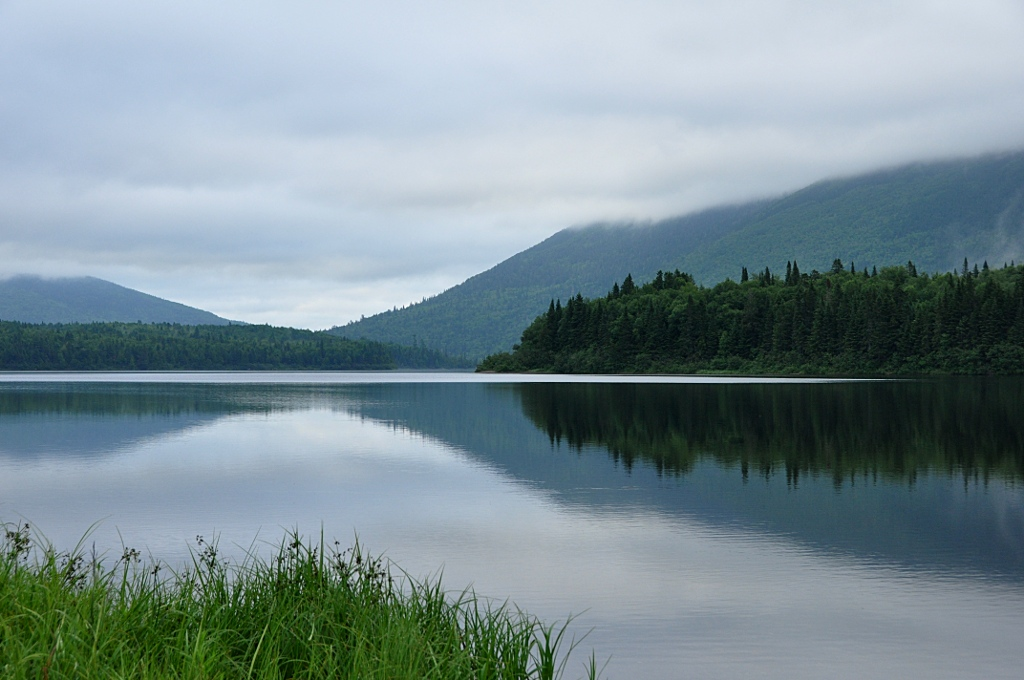
View of the Appalachian mountains from Mount Carleton Provincial Park

New Brunswick lies entirely within the Appalachian Mountain range. The rivers of New Brunswick drain into either the Gulf of Saint Lawrence to the east or the Bay of Fundy to the south. These watersheds include lands in Quebec and Maine. The highest point in New Brunswick is Mount Carleton, 817 m (2,680 ft).

New Brunswick and the rest of the Maritime Peninsula was covered by thick layers of ice during the last glacial period (the Wisconsinian glaciation). It cut U-shaped valleys in the Saint John and Nepisiguit River valleys and pushed granite boulders from the Miramichi highlands south and east, leaving them as erratics when the ice receded at the end of the Wisconsin glaciation, along with deposits such as the eskers between Woodstock and St George, which are today sources of sand and gravel.

== Demographics ==
Population density of New Brunswick

At the 2021 Canadian census, New Brunswick had a population of 775,610, a 3.8% increase since the 2016 Canadian census. As one of the four Atlantic Provinces which are Canada's least populated provinces, New Brunswick is the third-least populous province. The census also recorded New Brunswick as being the fourth-most densely populated Canadian province, with 10.9 people per square kilometre, behind Ontario, Nova Scotia and Prince Edward Island. As of September 2025, the population is estimated to be 869,682. Recent growth has largely been driven by interprovincial migration and international migration. New Brunswick had a median age of 46.3 years in 2021; despite recent population growth causing the median age to drop, it continues to rank second-highest among the provinces and territories.

New Brunswick was largely rural until 1951; since then, the rural-urban split has been roughly even. Its 107 municipalities cover 8.6% of the province's land mass but are home to 65.3% of its population. The three major urban areas are in the south of the province: Greater Moncton (157,717 in 2021), Greater Saint John (130,613), and Greater Fredericton (108,610). All three grew between 2016 and 2021, Moncton fastest at 8.9 per cent.

=== Ethnicity ===
In the 2001 census, the most commonly reported ethnicities were British 40%, French Canadian and Acadian 31%, Irish 18%, other European 7%, First Nations 3%, Asian Canadian 2%. Each person could choose more than one ethnicity.

=== Language ===
The province's distribution of English and French is highly regional.

As of the 2021 Canadian Census, the most spoken languages in the province included English (698,025 or 91.94%), French (317,825 or 41.86%), Spanish (7,580 or 1%), Arabic (6,090 or 0.8%), Tagalog (4,225 or 0.56%), and Hindi (3,745 or 0.49%). The question on knowledge of languages allows for multiple responses.

According to the Charter of Rights and Freedoms in the Canadian Constitution, English and French are the official languages of New Brunswick, making it the only officially bilingual province. Government and public services are available in both languages, and separate English-language and French-language systems serve the two linguistic communities at all education levels. Anglophone New Brunswickers make up roughly two-thirds of the population, while about one-third are Francophone. Recently there has been growth in the numbers of people reporting themselves as bilingual, with 34% reporting that they speak both English and French. This reflects a trend across Canada.

=== Religion ===
According to the 2021 census, religious groups in New Brunswick included:

- Christianity (512,645 persons or 67.5%)
- Irreligion (225,125 persons or 29.7%)
- Islam (9,190 persons or 1.2%)
- Hinduism (3,340 persons or 0.4%)
- Sikhism (1,780 persons or 0.2%)
- Buddhism (1,120 persons or 0.1%)
- Indigenous Spirituality (1,005 persons or 0.1%)
- Judaism (1,000 persons or 0.1%)
- Other (3,990 persons or 0.5%)

In the 2011 census, 84% of provincial residents reported themselves as Christian: 52% were Roman Catholic, 8% Baptist, 8% United Church of Canada, 7% Anglican and 9% other Christian. 15% percent of residents reported no religion.

== Economy ==
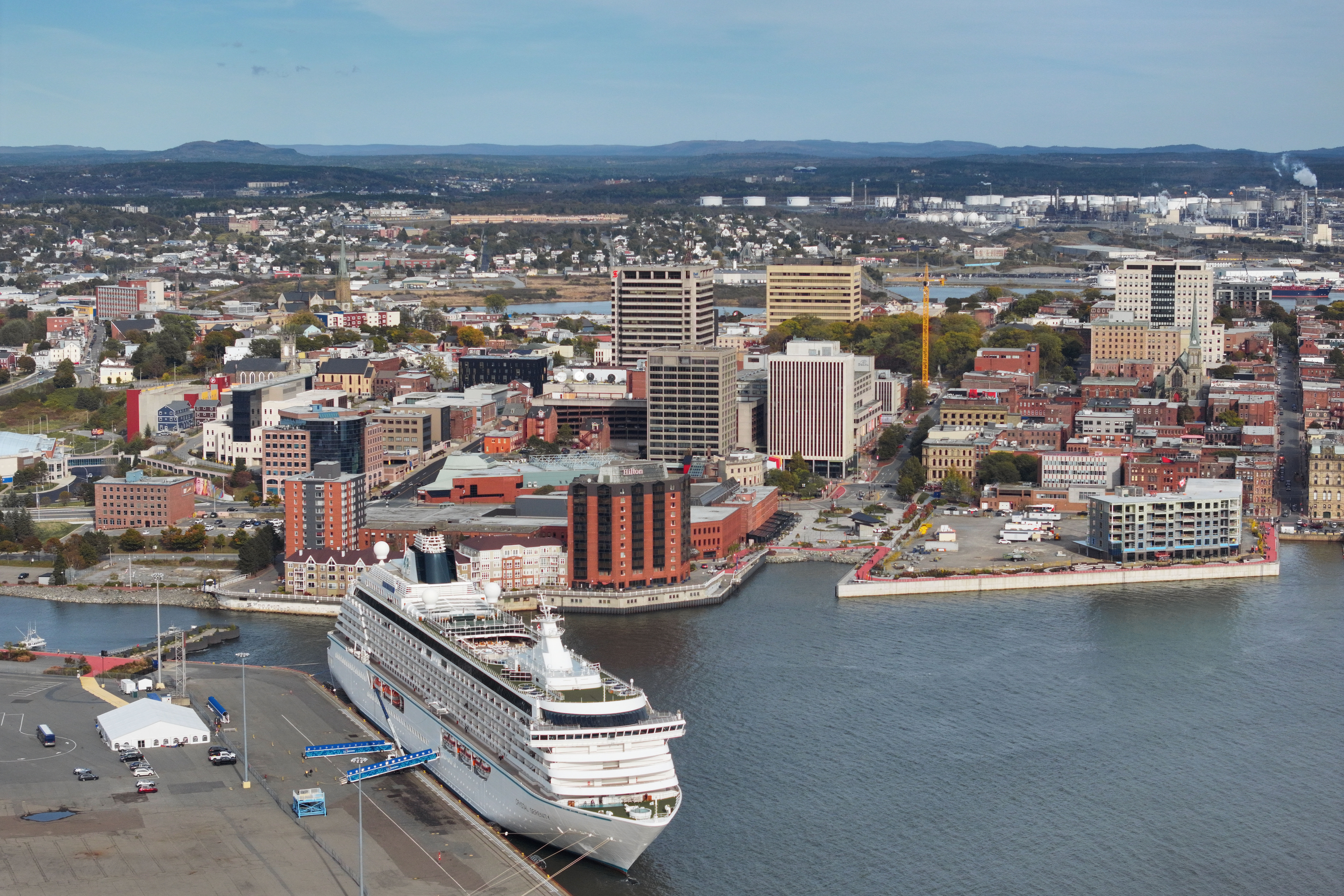
Uptown Saint John is a commercial hub and seaport for the province.

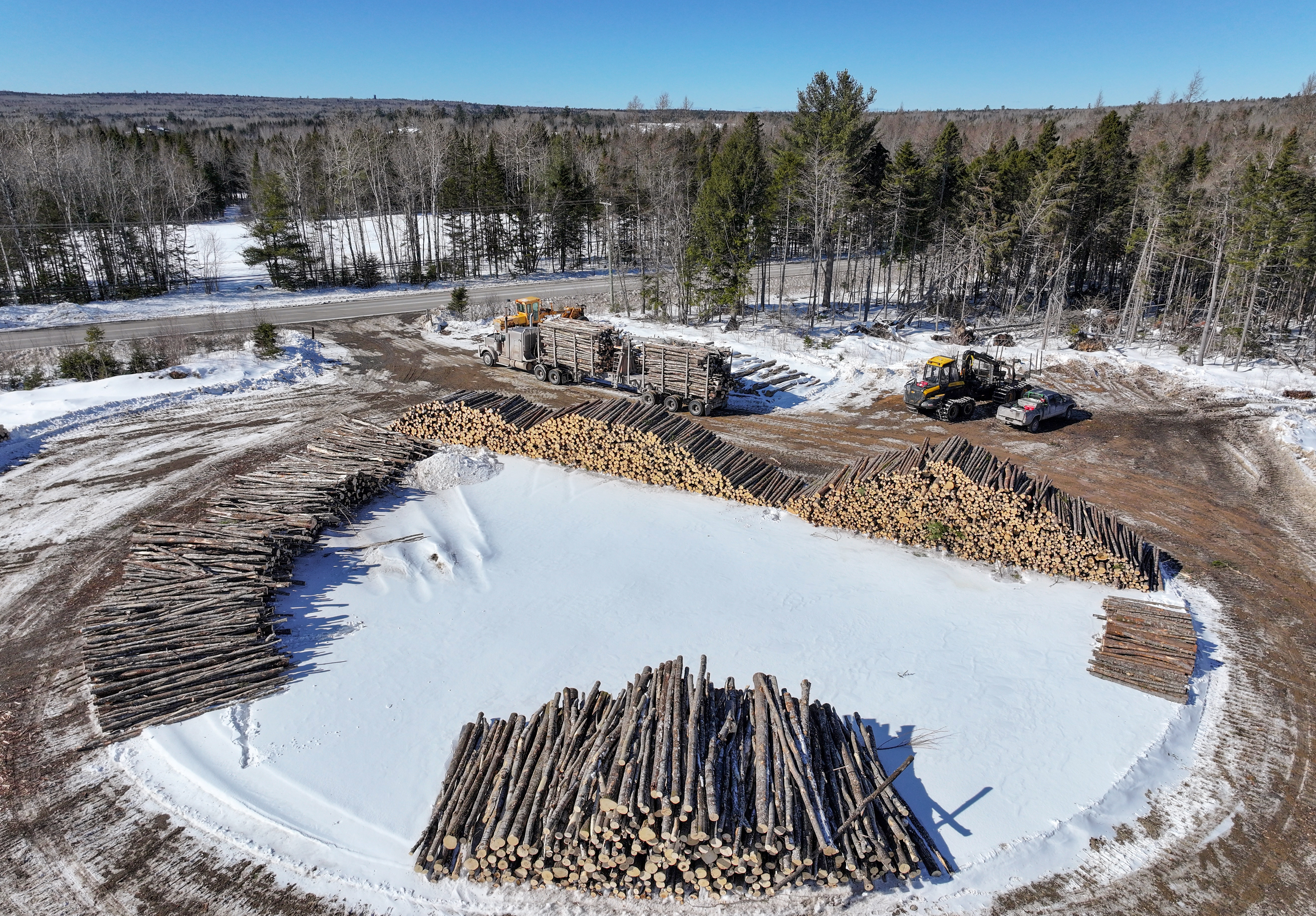
Stacks of timber in Fredericton awaiting transport to a mill

As of October 2017, seasonally adjusted employment is 73,400 for the goods-producing sector and 280,900 for the services-producing sector. Those in the goods-producing industries are mostly employed in manufacturing or construction, while those in services work in social assistance, trades, and health care. A large portion of the economy is controlled by the Irving Group of Companies, which consists of the holdings of the family of K. C. Irving. The companies have significant holdings in agriculture, forestry, food processing, freight transport (including railways and trucking), media, oil, and shipbuilding.

The influence of the Irving family on New Brunswick is such that the province is sometimes described as being subject to a form of economic feudalism. In 2016, the 200 or so companies it controls gave it about $10 billion in capital. The group's activities are supported by the authorities through numerous tax exemptions and the payment of subsidies, notably through the Renewable Energy Purchase Program for Large Industry. The province has also progressively handed over the management of the public sector forestry assets to the Irving Group, regularly lowering standards. In 2014, the latter reduced the size of buffer zones between forests and human settlements, allowed more clear-cutting, increased the planned production volume and reduced the proportion of protected areas from 31% to 22%.

Through Acadia Broadcasting the family owns several local radio stations. The family owned all the province's English-language newspapers through Brunswick News until its sale to Postmedia in 2022. For academic Alain Deneault, "the conflicts of interest that arise from this situation seem caricatural: the group's media essentially echo the positions of the Irving family in all the fields of social and industrial life in which it is involved." The information transmitted by the group and disseminated by the press is sometimes questioned (notably in the fall of 2018, during an explosion at the Saint John refinery), but few public officials, professors and members of parliament carry denunciations, as the family's financial contributions to universities and political parties provide it with leverage.

The United States is the province's largest export market, accounting for 92% of foreign trade valued in 2014 at almost $13 billion, with refined petroleum making up 63% of that, followed by seafood products, pulp, paper and sawmill products and non-metallic minerals (chiefly potash). The value of exports, mostly to the United States, was $1.6 billion in 2016. About half of that came from lobster. Other products include salmon, crab, and herring. In 2015, spending on non-resident tourism in New Brunswick was $441 million, which provided $87 million in tax revenue.

Biologists, academics and Eilish Cleary, the province's former head of public health, have reported being subjected to intense pressure (including dismissal in Cleary's case) while analyzing the impact of the company's pesticides and its opaque forest management. Since the 1970s, every premier in the province has been elected with the support of Irving. Blaine Higgs, premier from 2018 to 2024, is a former executive of the group. According to journalist Michel Cormier: "We might be able to win an election without Irving's tacit support, but we could hardly aspire to power if he decided to openly oppose it."

=== Primary sector ===
A large number of residents from New Brunswick are employed in the primary sector of industry. More than 13,000 New Brunswickers work in agriculture, shipping products worth over $1 billion, half of which is from crops, and half of that from potatoes, mostly in the Saint John River valley. McCain Foods is one of the world's largest manufacturers of frozen potato products. Other products include apples, cranberries, and maple syrup. New Brunswick was in 2015 the biggest producer of wild blueberries in Canada. The value of the livestock sector is about a quarter of a billion dollars, nearly half of which is dairy. Other sectors include poultry, fur, and goats, sheep, and pigs.

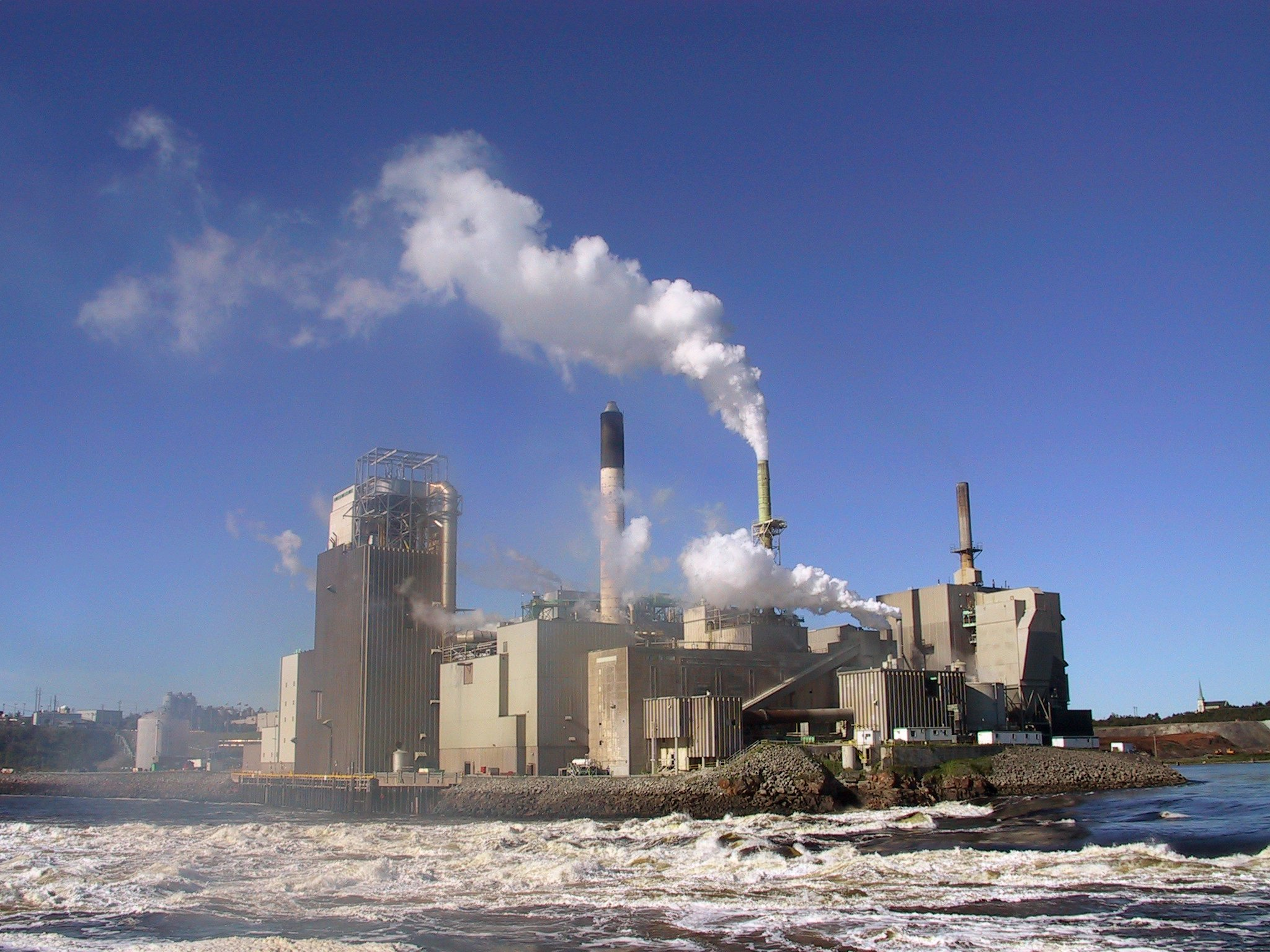
A New Brunswick pulp mill owned by J. D. Irving

About 85 to 90% of New Brunswick is forested. Historically important, it accounted for more than 80% of exports in the mid-1800s. By the end of the 1800s the industry, and shipbuilding, were declining due to external economic factors. The 1920s saw the development of a pulp and paper industry. In the mid-1960s, forestry practices changed from the controlled harvests of a commodity to the cultivation of the forests. The industry employs nearly 12,000, generating revenues around $437 million.

Mining was historically unimportant in the province, but has grown since the 1950s. The province's GDP from the Mining and Quarrying industry in 2015 was $299.5 million. Mines in New Brunswick produce lead, zinc, copper, and potash.

Forest management in the province is particularly opaque. Donald Bowser, an international expert on political corruption, says he is "shocked to discover that there is less transparency in New Brunswick than in Kurdistan, Guatemala or Sierra Leone, despite the huge public funds committed to natural resource development."

== Education ==
=== Elementary and secondary education ===
Public education at the elementary and secondary level in New Brunswick is administered by the provincial Department of Education and Early Childhood Development. The department operates at a budget of $1.9 billion as of 2024–2025, serving 109,021 students across 295 schools in the 2025–2026 school year.

New Brunswick's public school system reflects its bilingual status and operates parallel anglophone and francophone public school sectors. There are seven school districts, each governed by a District Education Council (DEC). The four anglophone districts are Anglophone North (Miramichi), Anglophone South (Saint John), Anglophone East (Moncton), and Anglophone West (Fredericton); the three francophone districts are Francophone Nord-Est (Tracadie), Francophone Nord-Ouest (Edmundston), and Francophone Sud (Dieppe). This structure has been in place since 2012, when the provincial government consolidated its 14 former, numerically named districts. About 27 per cent of students in the anglophone system were enrolled in French immersion in 2015-16.

=== Post-secondary education ===
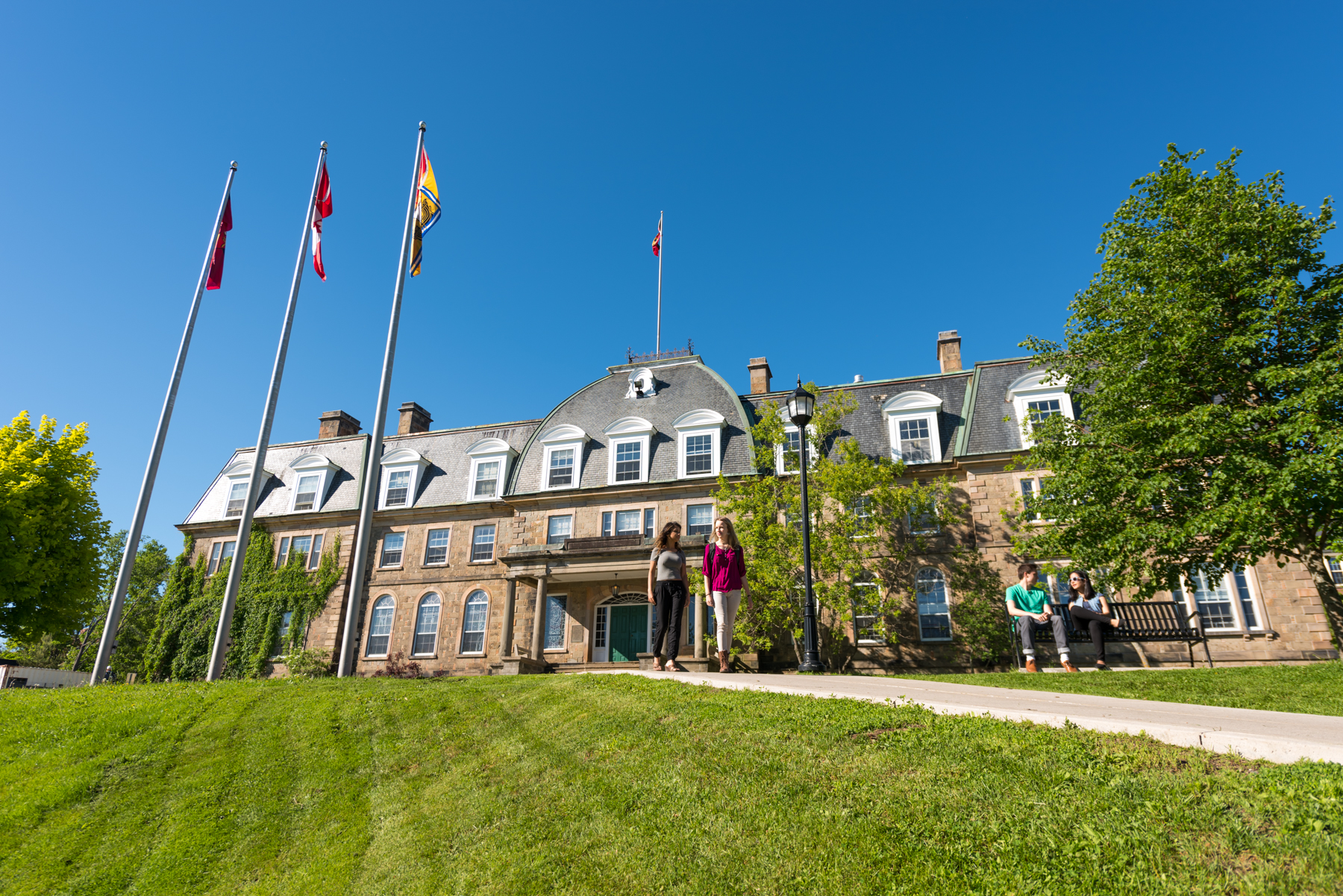
Sir Howard Douglas Hall at the University of New Brunswick is the oldest university building still in use in Canada.

The province also operates five public post-secondary institutions, including four public universities and one college. Four public universities operate campuses in New Brunswick, including the oldest English-language university in the country, the University of New Brunswick. Other English-language public universities include Mount Allison University, consistently ranked by Maclean's as Canada's top undergraduate university, and St. Thomas University, a liberal arts university located in Fredericton. The Université de Moncton is the province's only French-language university and the largest French-language university in Canada outside of Quebec. All four universities offer undergraduate, and postgraduate education. Additionally, the Université de Moncton and the University of New Brunswick also provide professional programs.

Public colleges in the province serve both anglophone and francophone populations. The New Brunswick Community College (NBCC) mainly serves the anglophone population through campuses in Fredericton, Moncton, Saint John, Miramichi, St. Andrews, and Woodstock. The Collège communautaire du Nouveau-Brunswick (CCNB) serves the francophone population through five campuses located in Bathurst, Campbellton, Dieppe, Edmundston, and on the Acadian Peninsula (Shippagan). Distinct from both systems, the New Brunswick College of Craft & Design has been operated through the Department of Post-Secondary Education, Training and Labour since 1938, and the Maritime College of Forest Technology operates in Fredericton.

In addition to public institutions, the province is home to several private vocational schools, such as the Moncton Flight College, and private universities, such as Crandall University, Kingswood University, St. Stephen's University, and the University of Fredericton.

== Government and politics ==
=== Provincial government ===
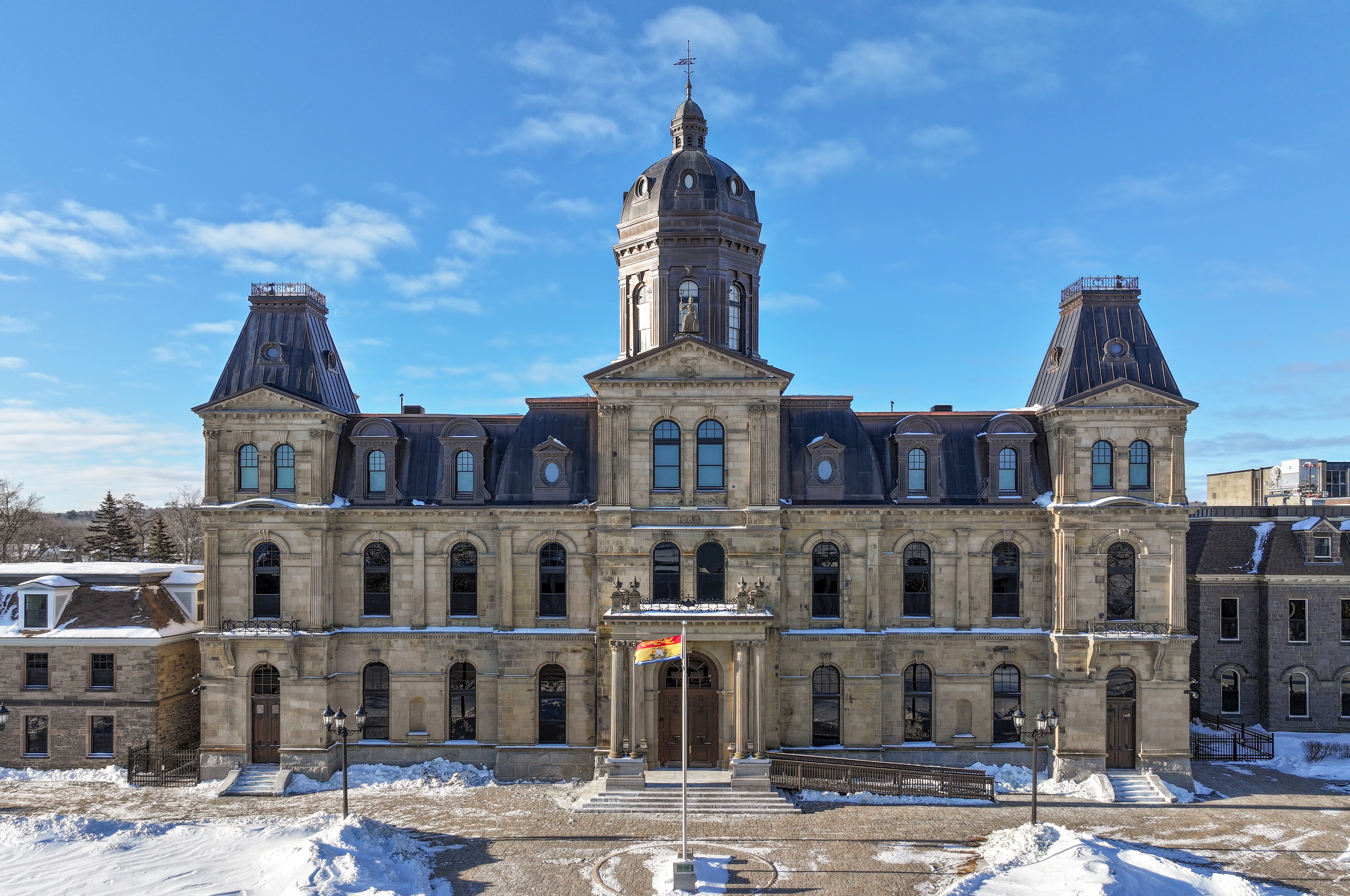
The New Brunswick Legislative Building serves as the meeting place for the provincial legislative assembly.

Under Canadian federalism, power is divided between federal and provincial governments. Among areas under federal jurisdiction are citizenship, foreign affairs, national defence, fisheries, criminal law, Indigenous policies, and many others. Provincial jurisdiction covers public lands, health, education, and local government, among other things. Jurisdiction is shared for immigration, pensions, agriculture, and welfare.

The parliamentary system of government is modelled on the British Westminster system. Forty-nine representatives, nearly always members of political parties, are elected to the Legislative Assembly of New Brunswick. The head of government is the Premier of New Brunswick, normally the leader of the party or coalition with the most seats in the legislative assembly. Governance is handled by the executive council (cabinet), with about 32 ministries. Ceremonial duties of the Monarchy in New Brunswick are mostly carried out by the Lieutenant Governor of New Brunswick.

Under amendments to the province's Legislative Assembly Act in 2017, New Brunswick's general elections are held every four years on the third Monday in October. The two largest political parties are the New Brunswick Liberal Association and the Progressive Conservative Party of New Brunswick. The Green Party of New Brunswick is currently the only minor party with representation in the Legislative Assembly. Previously, the People's Alliance of New Brunswick held seats from 2018 to 2022 before dissolving in 2025, and the New Brunswick New Democratic Party last had an MLA elected in 2003.

=== Judiciary ===
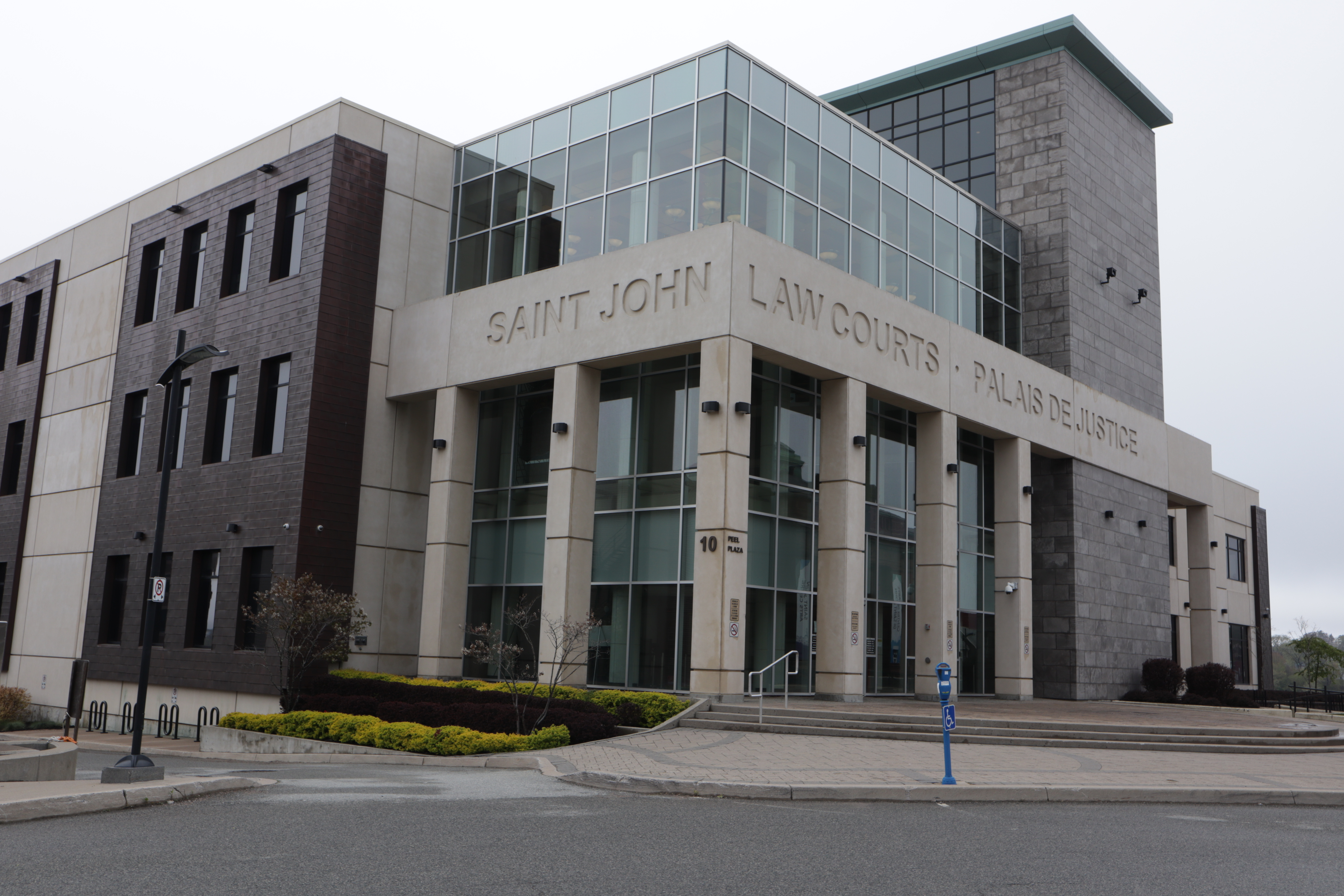
The Provincial Court of New Brunswick in Saint John

The Court of Appeal of New Brunswick is the highest provincial court. It hears appeals from:

- The Court of King's Bench of New Brunswick: has jurisdiction over family law and major criminal and civil cases and is divided accordingly into two divisions: Family and Trial. It also hears administrative tribunals.
- The Probate Court of New Brunswick: has jurisdiction over estates of deceased persons.
- The Provincial Court of New Brunswick: nearly all cases involving the Criminal Code start here.

The system consists of eight Judicial Districts, loosely based on the counties. The Chief Justice of New Brunswick serves at the apex of this court structure.

=== Administrative divisions ===
Administrative areas of New Brunswick (historic county borders also shown): Local service district Rural community Municipality Indian reserve

The province has fifteen counties, which served as upper-tier municipalities until the municipal reforms of 1966. While county governments have been abolished in New Brunswick, counties continue to be used as census divisions by Statistics Canada, and as an organizational unit, along with parishes, for registration of real-estate and its taxation. Counties continue to figure into the sense of identity of many New Brunwickers. Counties are further subdivided into 152 parishes, which also lost their political significance in 1966 but are still used as census subdivisions by Statistics Canada.

Ninety-two per cent of the land in the province, inhabited by about 35% of the population, is under provincial administration and has no local, elected representation. The 51% of the province that is Crown land is administered by the Department of Natural Resources and Energy Development.

Most of the province is administrated as a local service district (LSD), an unincorporated unit of local governance. As of 2017, there are 237 LSDs. Services, paid for by property taxes, include a variety of services such as fire protection, solid waste management, street lighting, and dog regulation. LSDs may elect advisory committees and work with the Department of Local Government to recommend how to spend locally collected taxes.

In 2006 there were three rural communities. This is a relatively new type of entity; to be created, it requires a population of 3,000 and a tax base of $200 million. In 2006 there were 101 municipalities.

Regional Service Commissions, which number 12, were introduced in 2013 to regulate regional planning and solid waste disposal, and provide a forum for discussion on a regional level of police and emergency services, climate change adaptation planning, and regional sport, recreational and cultural facilities. The commissions' administrative councils are populated by the mayors of each municipality or rural community within a region.

==== Provincial finances ====
In 2025, New Brunswick had the most poorly-performing economy of any Canadian province. The government has historically run at a large deficit. With about half of the population being rural, it is expensive for the government to provide education and health services, which account for 60 per cent of government expenditure. Thirty-six per cent of the provincial budget is covered by federal cash transfers.

New Brunswick had a 2024–2025 deficit of $104.4 million. This was despite $156 million as a payment from tobacco companies. Further repayments as have been cited source of economic revitalisation in the future, as Brunswick is estimated to net $614 from JTI-Macdonald Corp., Imperial Tobacco Canada Ltd., and Rothmans, Benson & Hedges.

The government has frequently attempted to create employment through subsidies, which has often failed to generate long-term economic prosperity and has resulted in bad debt, examples of which include Bricklin, Atcon, and the Marriott call centre in Fredericton.

According to a 2014 study by the Atlantic Institute for Market Studies, the large public debt is a very serious problem. Government revenues are shrinking because of a decline in federal transfer payments. Though expenditures are down (through government pension reform and a reduction in the number of public employees), they have increased relative to GDP, necessitating further measures to reduce debt in the future.

In the 2024–25 fiscal year, provincial debt reached $12.3 billion, an increase over the $11.8 billion recorded in 2023–2024. In 2024–2025 "the province's net debt-to-GDP ratio went down, meaning the economy grew faster than the debt.

=== Politics ===
Since the mid-20th century, New Brunswick has seen itself sway between being governed under either the Progressive Conservative Party or the Liberal Association, with both having seen several terms in power. Since this time period, New Brunswick had also generally elected Premiers who were generally younger, with most Premiers being elected in their thirties; this trend changed significantly following the 2018 provincial election, which saw Blaine Higgs take provincial office at age 64, the oldest in the province's history.

=== Indigenous governance ===
There are 15 First Nations in New Brunswick, nine Mi'kmaq and six Wolastoqey, holding 31 reserves.

== Infrastructure ==
=== Energy ===
Generating capacity by source in New Brunswick, 2025-26:
1. Fossil fuel (51.9%)
2. Hydro (21.1%)
3. Nuclear (14.8%)
4. Wind (8.38%)
5. Biomass (2.67%)
6. Other renewables (1.05%)

The Crown corporation NB Power has a total generating capacity of about 3,800 MW from hydro, coal, oil, natural gas and diesel stations and the Point Lepreau Nuclear Generating Station, the only active nuclear plant outside of Ontario. Third-party producers supply 685 MW more, mostly from renewable sources, under purchase agreements. The largest stations are the oil-fired Coleson Cove (972 MW), the hydroelectic Mactaquac (668 MW), Point Lepreau (~660 MW) and the coal-fired Belledune (467 MW). There were 30 active natural gas production sites in 2012.

=== Health care ===
New Brunswickers receive publicly funded hospital and physician care through Medicare, administered by the Department of Health. They can use their Medicare card to get this care or receive care in another province. Services are delivered by two regional health authorities: the Horizon Health Network, which operates mainly in English, and the Vitalité Health Network, which operates mainly in French. There also exists 2 confidential health information lines: 911 (for emergencies) and 811 (for non-urgent health questions).

Finding a family doctor is important for all New Brunswickers, but it has become difficult over the last decade. Patient Connect NB is a provincially managed, bilingual patient registry that matches New Brunswickers with a family doctor or nurse practitioner on a first-come, first-serve basis. As of 2022, this registry lists at 74,000 people waiting to be matched.

Health care services not covered by the government include: dentists, optometrists, retirement homes, mental health services, private clinics, and health insurance.

== Transportation ==
The Department of Transportation and Infrastructure maintains government facilities and the province's highway network and ferries. The Trans-Canada Highway is not under federal jurisdiction, and traverses the province from Edmundston following the Saint John River Valley, through Fredericton, Moncton, and on to Nova Scotia and Prince Edward Island.

=== Regional public transportation ===
The provincial government operates public transportation by ferry. Four cities in New Brunswick operate urban public transportation services: Fredericton Transit (Fredericton), Codiac Transpo (Moncton), Saint John Transit (Saint John), and Miramichi Transit (Miramichi). Parts of the province are also served by Maritime Bus, a coach operator.

=== Ferry ===
Multiple areas along the Saint John River contain ferries operated by the Department of Transportation and Infrastructure, with routes connecting Greater Saint John to the Kingston Peninsula, as well as some routes connecting mainland New Brunswick to various islands. The province is also serviced by Coastal Transport Limited, a ferry service which operates three ferries in the province, including a route between Blacks Harbour and Grand Manan Island. Bay Ferries operates the MV Fundy Rose, connecting Saint John to Digby, Nova Scotia.

=== Rail ===
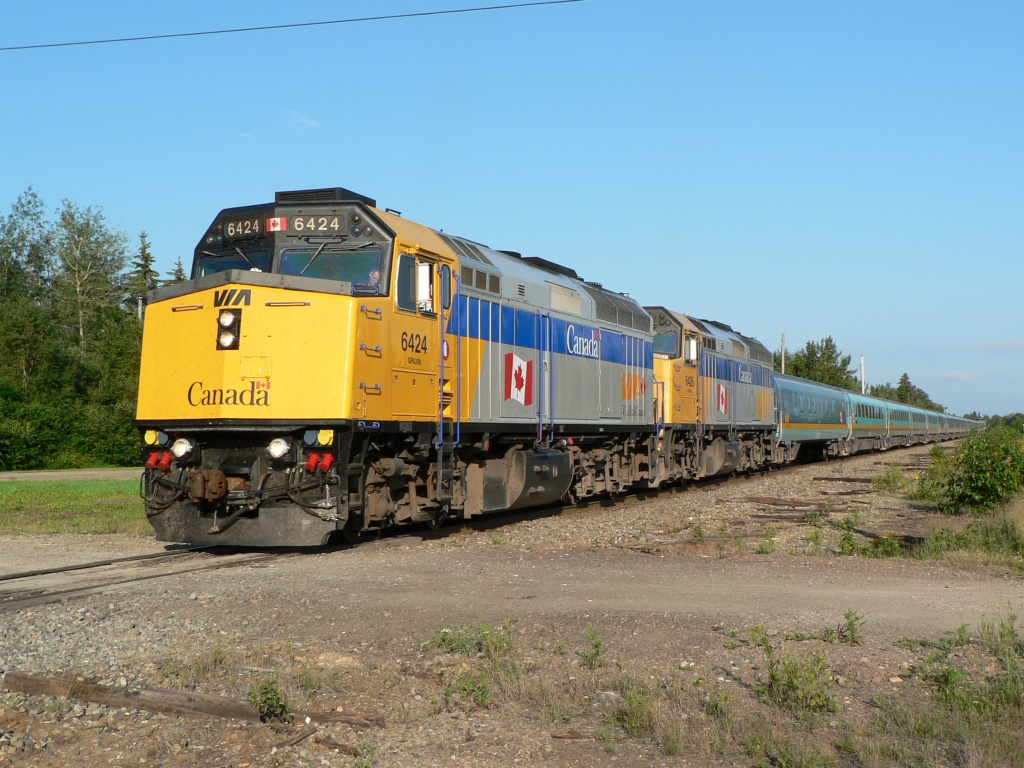
Via Ocean 14 Jacquet River NB 31 July 2006

Via Rail's Ocean service, which connects Montreal to Halifax, is currently the oldest continuously operated passenger route in North America, with stops from west to east at Campbellton, Charlo, Jacquet River, Petit Rocher, Bathurst, Miramichi, Rogersville, Moncton, and Sackville.

Canadian National Railway operates freight services along the same route, as well as a subdivision from Moncton to Saint John. The New Brunswick Southern Railway, a division of J. D. Irving Limited, together with its sister company Eastern Maine Railway form a continuous 305 km (190 mi) main line connecting Saint John and Brownville Junction, Maine.

== Cities, towns, villages, counties and parishes ==
There are 8 cities, 30 towns, and 21 villages in New Brunswick, grouped into 15 counties and 152 parishes. The fifteen counties, alphabetically, are Albert, Carleton, Charlotte, Gloucester, Kent, Kings, Madawaska, Northumberland, Queens, Restigouche, Saint John, Sunbury, Victoria, Westmorland, and York.

New Brunswick's provincial capital is Fredericton. The population of the city is 63,116 as of 2021. The largest city by population is Moncton with 79,400 residents, and the largest in land area is Saint John at 315.59 square kilometres (121.85 sq mi). New Brunswick's other cities are Dieppe, Miramichi, Edmundston, Bathurst, and Campbellton.

== Culture ==
=== Symbols ===
The coat of arms was assigned by royal warrant of Queen Victoria in 1868. The provincial flag, based on the coat of arms, was adopted in 1965. The conventional heraldic representations of a lion and a ship represent colonial ties with Europe, and the importance of shipping at the time the coat of arms was assigned. The provincial motto is Spem reduxit ("Hope restored"). Other official symbols include the purple violet (adopted 1936), the black-capped chickadee (1983) and the balsam fir (1987).

=== Historic places and museums ===
New Brunswick has 63 national historic sites including Fort Beauséjour, designated in 1920, as well as living history museums which include Kings Landing Historical Settlement and the Village Historique Acadien. Established in 1842, the New Brunswick Museum in Saint John was designated as the provincial museum of New Brunswick. The province is also home to a number of other museums in addition to the provincial museum.

=== Music and theatre ===
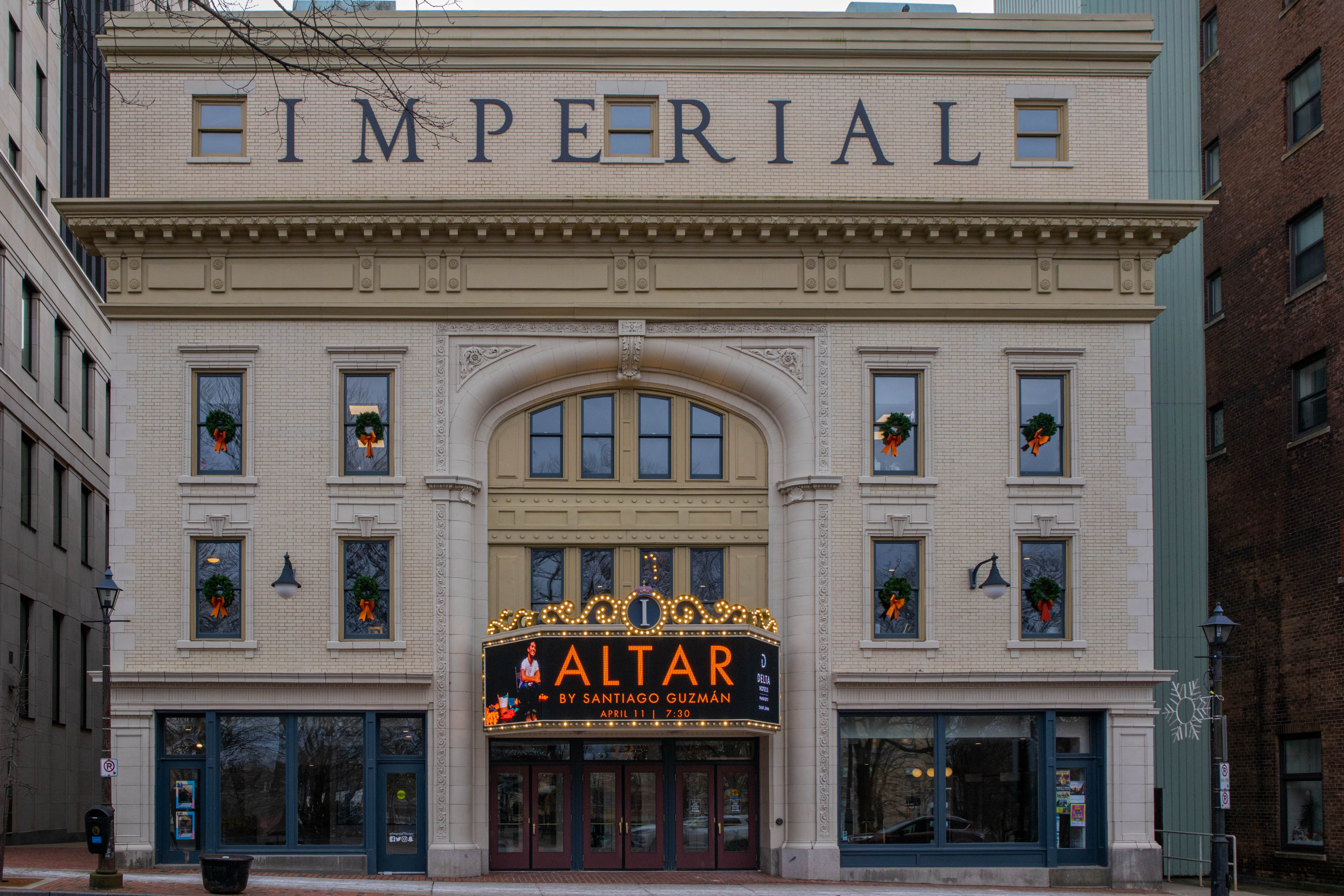
The Imperial Theatre in Saint John hosts the productions of the Atlantic Ballet Theatre of Canada and Theatre New Brunswick.

The music of New Brunswick includes artists such as Henry Burr, Roch Voisine, Lenny Breau, and Édith Butler. Symphony New Brunswick, based in Saint John, tours extensively in the province. Symphony New Brunswick and the Atlantic Ballet Theatre of Canada tours nationally and internationally.

Theatre New Brunswick tours plays around the province. Canadian playwright Norm Foster saw his early works premiere with Theatre New Brunswick. Other theatres of the province include the Théatre populaire d'Acadie in Caraquet, the Live Bait Theatre in Sackville, the Imperial in Saint John, the Capitol theatre in Moncton, and the Playhouse theatre in Fredericton.

=== Visual arts ===
New Brunswick is home to many galleries across the province, with key institutions including the Beaverbrook Art Gallery in Fredericton, the Owens Art Gallery at Mount Allison University in Sackville, and the Galerie d'art Louise-et-Reuben-Cohen at the Université de Moncton, along with multiple private and community institutions such as Gallery 78, Sunbury Shores Arts & Nature Centre, and the Grand Manan Art Gallery. New Brunswick also has four artist-run-centres: Connexion ARC located in Fredericton, Galerie Sans Nom in Moncton, Struts Gallery in Sackville, and Third Space Gallery in Saint John, as well as one artist-run printshop, Atelier d'estampe Imago Inc., located in Moncton.

The Beaverbrook Art Gallery, designated as the provincial art gallery in 1994, originated from a 1959 gift by Lord Beaverbrook and now holds over 6,000 works. Among its collections are works by J. M. W. Turner (The Fountain of Indolence), Salvador Dalí (Santiago El Grande), along with works by Thomas Gainsborough, John Constable, John Singer Sargent, Lucian Freud, and Joshua Reynolds.

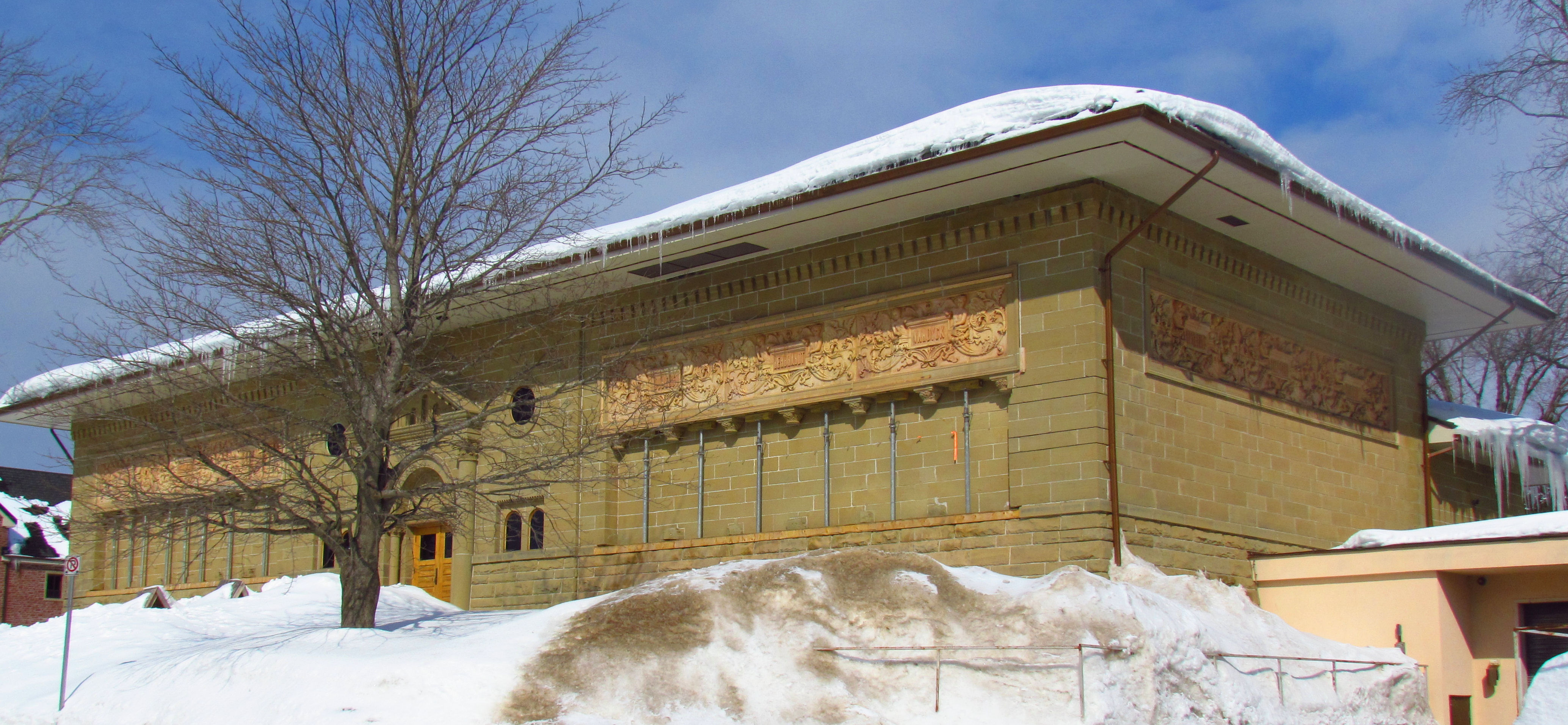
The Owens Art Gallery at Mount Allison University is the oldest university-operated art gallery in Canada.

Mount Allison University is known for its art program, which was created in 1854. The program came into its own under John A. Hammond, from 1893 to 1916. Notable graduates include Alex Colville, Christopher Pratt, Mary Pratt, and Herménégilde Chiasson. The university also opened an art gallery in 1895 and is named for its patron, John Owens of Saint John. The Owens Art Gallery at Mount Allison University is presently the oldest university-operated art gallery in Canada.

Modern New Brunswick artists include landscape painter Jack Humphrey, sculptor Claude Roussel, and Miller Brittain.

=== Literature ===
Julia Catherine Beckwith, born in Fredericton in 1796, wrote St. Ursula's Convent, the first work of fiction by a native-born Canadian and the first published in what is now Canada. Bliss Carman and his cousin Charles G. D. Roberts were prominent poets in early Canada and are among what is referred to as the Confederation Poets; Carman was regarded as Canada's unofficial poet laureate after his 1921 tour. Antonine Maillet of Bouctouche, author of La Sagouine, was the first non-European winner of France's Prix Goncourt. Other modern writers include Alfred Bailey, Alden Nowlan, John Thompson, Douglas Lochhead, K. V. Johansen, David Adams Richards, and France Daigle. A recent New Brunswick Lieutenant-Governor, Herménégilde Chiasson, is a poet and playwright. The Fiddlehead, established in 1945 at University of New Brunswick, is Canada's oldest literary magazine.

=== Sports ===
Ice hockey has been surveyed as the most popular spectator sport in Atlantic Canada. The Moncton Wildcats and Saint John Sea Dogs play in the Quebec Maritimes Junior Hockey League, with the latter winning the Memorial Cup twice in 2011 and 2022. The Acadie-Bathurst Titan, which also won the Memorial Cup in 2018, were sold and moved to Newfoundland and Labrador in 2025.

In basketball, New Brunswick previously had two professional teams in the National Basketball League of Canada: the Moncton Magic and Saint John Riptide. Professional basketball has been returning to New Brunswick more recently, with the creation of the Port City Power and Tri-City Tide of The Basketball League.

== Media ==
New Brunswick has four daily newspapers, three English and one French: the Telegraph-Journal in Saint John and distributed province-wide, the Times & Transcript in Moncton, The Daily Gleaner in Fredericton and L'Acadie Nouvelle in Caraquet. The three English-language dailies and multiple other weeklies are operated by Brunswick News, which was previously privately owned by J.D. Irving until being sold to Postmedia Network in 2022.

The Canadian Broadcasting Corporation has anglophone television and radio operations in Fredericton. Télévision de Radio-Canada is based in Moncton. CTV and Global also operate stations in New Brunswick, which operate largely as sub-feeds of their stations in Halifax as part of regional networks.

There are 34 radio stations licensed in New Brunswick, broadcasting in English or French.

== See also ==
- Outline of New Brunswick
- Symbols of New Brunswick
