= Jacquet River, New Brunswick =

Community in Belledune, New Brunswick

Coordinates: 47.917°N 66.000°W

Jacquet River
- Community (Dissolved village)
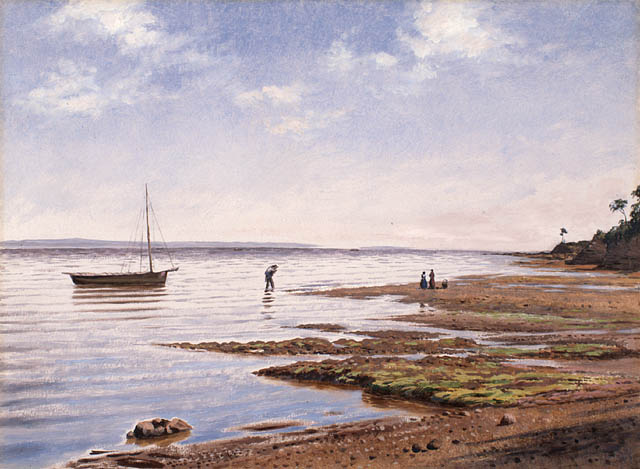
- Jacquet River, New Brunswick, from 1875

- Location within New Brunswick
- Country: Canada
- Province: New Brunswick
- County: Restigouche
- Parish: Durham
- Village: Belledune
- Founded: 1790
- Incorporated: 1966; 60 years ago
- Amalgamation: 1994; 32 years ago
- Time zone: UTC-4 (AST)
  - Summer (DST): UTC-3 (ADT)
- Postal code: E8G
- Area code: 506
- Highways: Route 11; Route 134

Jacquet River is a community in the village of Belledune in Restigouche County, New Brunswick. Previously, it was a village until 1994, when it amalgamated into Belledune.

It has an elementary and middle school, which is also used by the surrounding communities. It has a grocery store, along with a few locally owned convenience stores. It has a municipal park, which is maintained by the village. A song from the 1970s by Canadian artist Ray Griff references Jacquet River.

== History ==
Federal census population history of Jacquet River
Year	Pop.	±%
1971	866	—
1971A	727	−16.1%
1976	735	+1.1%
1981	778	+5.9%
1981A	887	+14.0%
1986	954	+7.6%
1991	872	−8.6%
Source: Statistics Canada

In 1994, the Village of Jacquet River, along with a few unincorporated communities, amalgamated with the Village of Belledune to form a larger village known as Belledune. Due to Belledune retaining its village status, it was nicknamed "The Super Village".

Jacquet River is a multilingual community. The community was named after James Augustus Doyle, a disbanded veteran of the American War of Independence, whose family, speaking French, referred to him as "Jacques." An unusual spelling of the letter 's' in official papers led to the name "Jacquet River". Features:

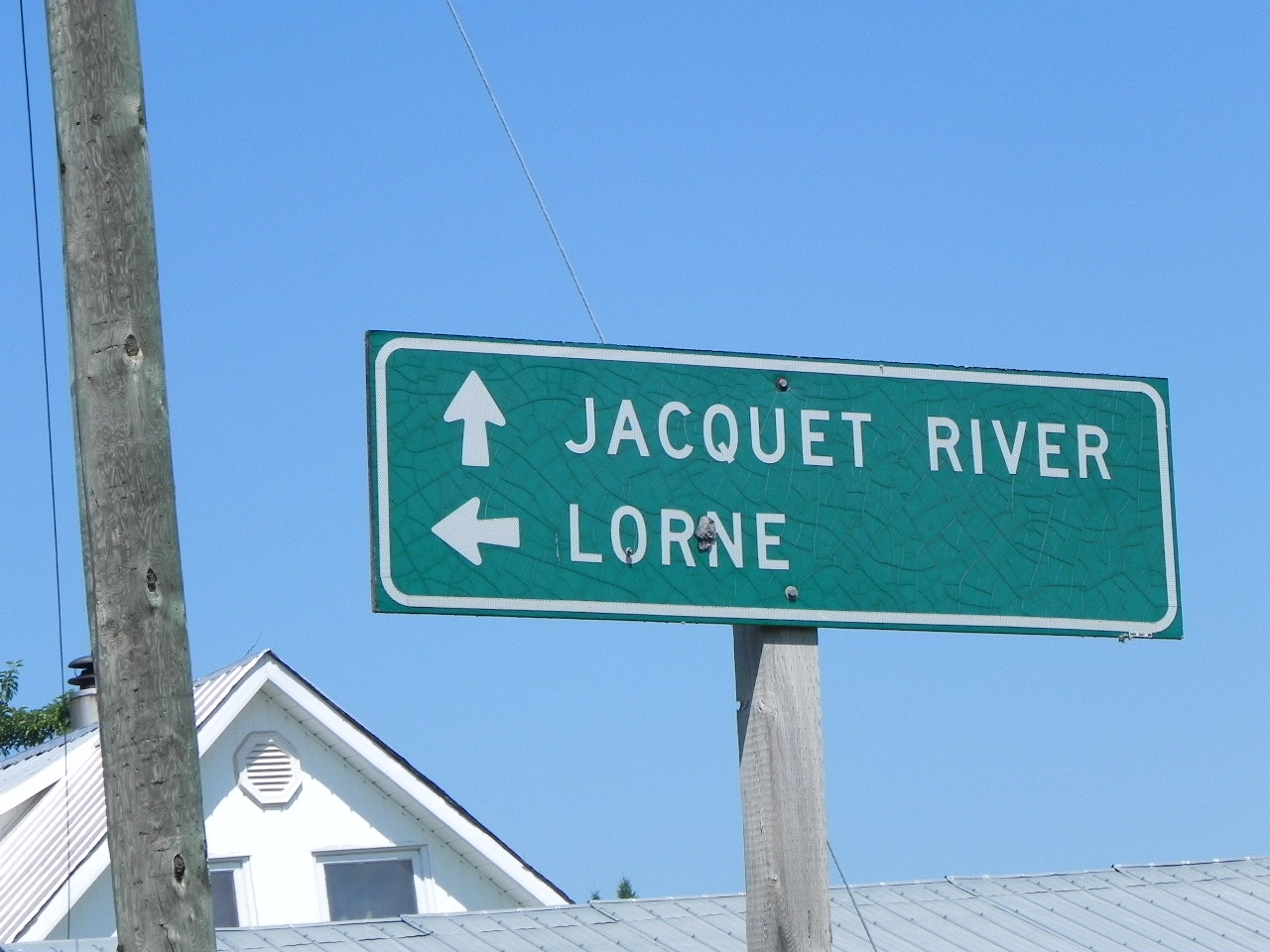
A Sign for Jacquet River still found in area

== Transportation ==
VIA Rail's train, The Ocean, makes stops on request at the Jacquet River station, a flag stop platform. The station building was demolished, along with nearby Charlo station, in October 2021.

== See also ==
- List of neighbourhoods in New Brunswick
