= Tourism in New Brunswick =

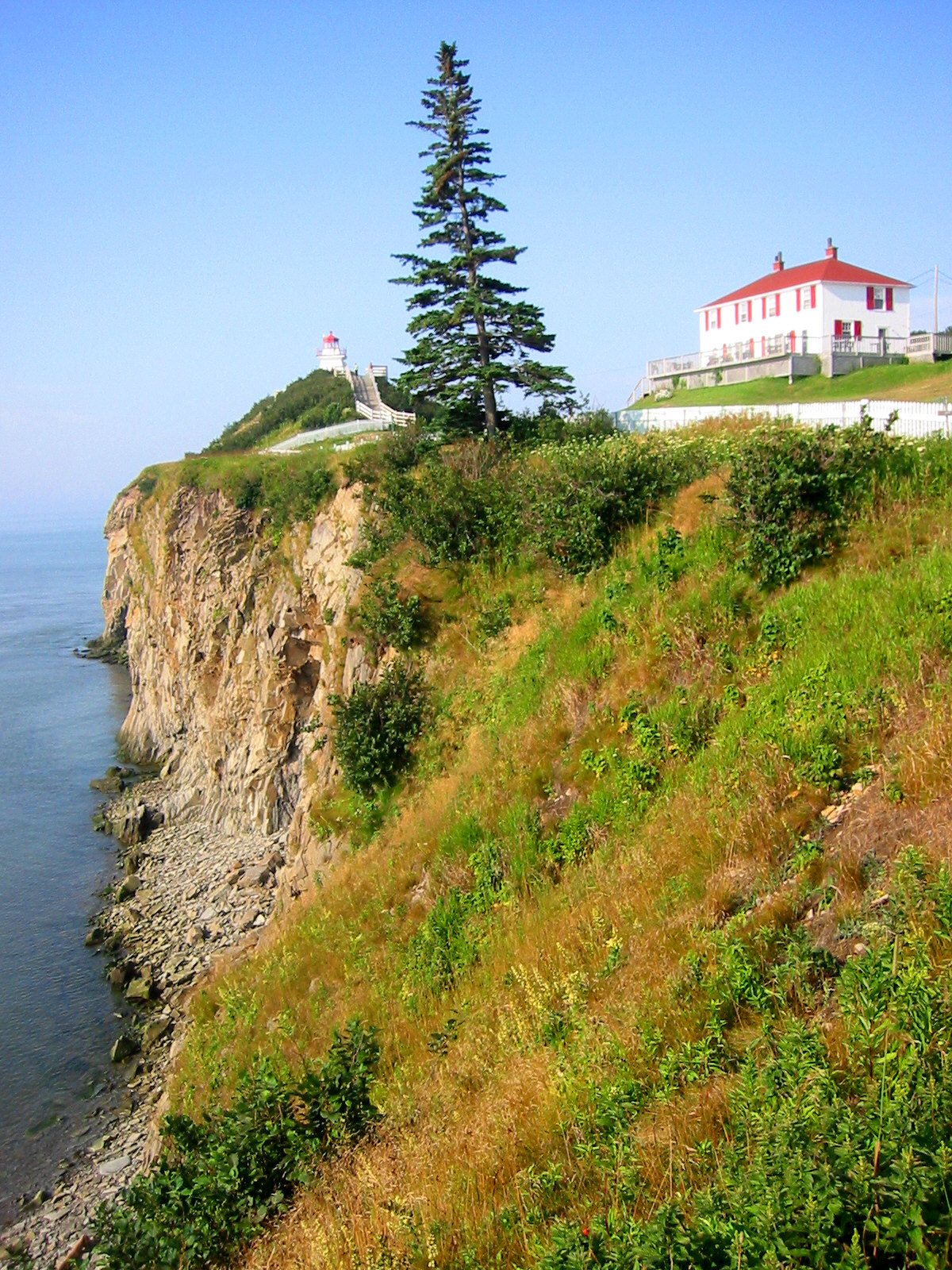
Cape Enrage.

There are two major national parks (Fundy National Park and Kouchibouguac National Park). The warmest salt water beaches north of Virginia can be found on the Northumberland Strait, at Parlee Beach in Shediac. New Brunswick's signature natural attraction (the Hopewell Rocks) are only a half hour's drive down the Petitcodiac river valley. The Confederation Bridge to Prince Edward Island is only an hour's drive east of Moncton.

New Brunswick has several major attractions:

- Tidal bore - A phenomenon created by the extreme tides of the Bay of Fundy which actually reverses the downstream flow of the Petitcodiac River at high tide. A causeway to Riverview was built in the 1960s, which has significantly diminished the effects of the bore. Efforts are underway to have the causeway replaced by a bridge in order to restore the river flow but there is a great amount of opposition from land owners on "Lake Petitcodiac" (the recreational headpond created on the western side of the causeway), who fear that their property values will plummet as a result.

== Dieppe ==
- Champlain Place - At 816,000 sq ft (75,800 m^{2}), and with over 160 stores and services, is the second largest shopping mall in Atlantic Canada,
- Bass Pro Complex - Located adjacent to Champlain Place. The complex houses an eight cinema multiplex and a bookstore/cafe. A Bass Pro Shop opened in the complex in 2015 with the closure of the hotel, amusement park and restaurant areas.

== Moncton ==
Moncton is well situated as a tourism destination.

- Monument for Recognition in the 21st century the interpretation centre of Our Lady of the Assumption Cathedral.
- Shopping at Trinity Power Centre and Northwest Centre.
- See also Magnetic Hill, New Brunswick in Moncton for additional attractions in that area.

== Other sites ==
Other provincial attractions include:

- Miramichi Valley scenic river route with many ATV trails.
- Cape Jourimain Nature Centre (at the base of the Confederation Bridge)
- La Dune de Bouctouche Irving Eco-Centre (ecotourism site, beach, longest remaining unspoiled barrier dune system on the eastern seaboard (twelve kilometers))
- Cape Enrage (historic lighthouse, fossils and adventure tourism)
- Le Pays de la Sagouine (Acadian cultural theme park).
- Fort Beausejour (National Historic Park) located in Aulac, New Brunswick.
- Sackville Waterfowl Park (nature trails & boardwalk over freshwater marsh, waterfowl viewing platforms).
- Saint Andrews, New Brunswick (national historic site featuring an original 18th-century British colonial grid layout with a market wharf square and classical architecture.).

== Getting around New Brunswick ==
New Brunswick is served by the national rail carrier, VIA Rail, three times a week. VIA uses in New Brunswick the Canadian National rail line, which enters from Quebec at Campbellton, stops at Bathurst, Miramichi, Moncton and Amherst, on its way to terminus at Halifax, Nova Scotia. The Trans-Canada Highway enters from Quebec in Edmundston, passes through Fredericton and Moncton and exits at Sackville on the way to Nova Scotia. Maritime Bus provides daily service on an extensive network of routes, and Taxi Cormier of Anse Bleue provides intermittent service of a different sort on the Acadian Peninsula.

== New Brunswick Tourism Statistics ==
The number of tourists visiting New Brunswick has remained relatively stable for the years 2006 - 2013, remaining largely within the 2.5 to 3 million visitors range, with a peak of just over 3 million visitors in 2011. In 2012, tourism made up 2.4 percent of the provincial GDP, employing 8.6 percent of the labour force with 30,220 total jobs. Total tax revenues in New Brunswick for the federal, provincial, and municipal governments was approximately $273,638,000.
