= Jacquet River station =

Railway station in New Brunswick, Canada

Jacquet River
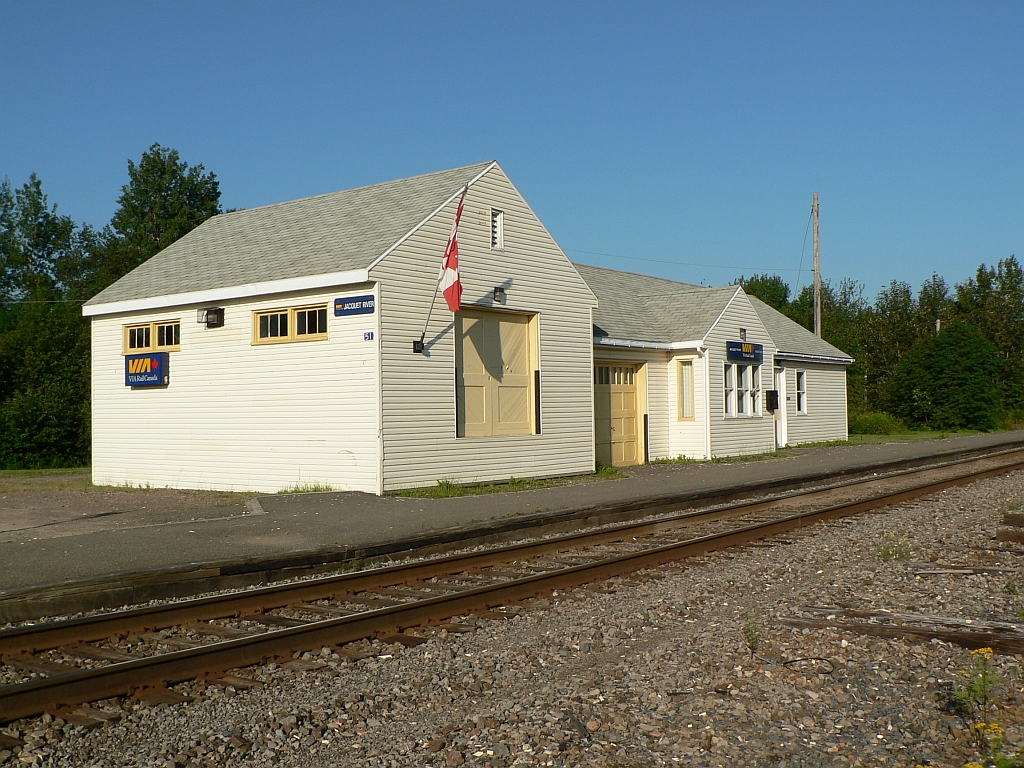
- The former station, photographed in 2006.

General information
- Location: 51 Ellis Road; Jacquet River, New Brunswick; Canada
- Coordinates: 47°55′13″N 66°00′04″W
- Platforms: 1 side platform
- Tracks: 1

Construction
- Structure type: Sign post
- Parking: Yes
- Cycle facilities: Yes

Services
Preceding station	Via Rail	Following station
Charlo toward Montreal	Ocean	Petit Rocher toward Halifax
Former services
Preceding station	Canadian National Railway	Following station
Nash Creek toward Montreal	Montreal – Moncton	Uitican toward Moncton
Location

The Jacquet River station is a flag stop Via Rail station in the community of Jacquet River, New Brunswick, Canada. Jacquet River is served by Via Rail's Montreal-Halifax train, the Ocean.

Until 2021 the station was a traditional bay-windowed passenger and freight station, built by Canadian National Railway. In the summer of 2021, VIA announced the demolition of the station due to its poor condition. The station was demolished, along with nearby Charlo station between October 7 and 9, 2021. VIA Rail's train, the Ocean, continues to make stops on request at the flag stop platform.
