= Campbellton station =

Railway station in New Brunswick, Canada

Campbellton
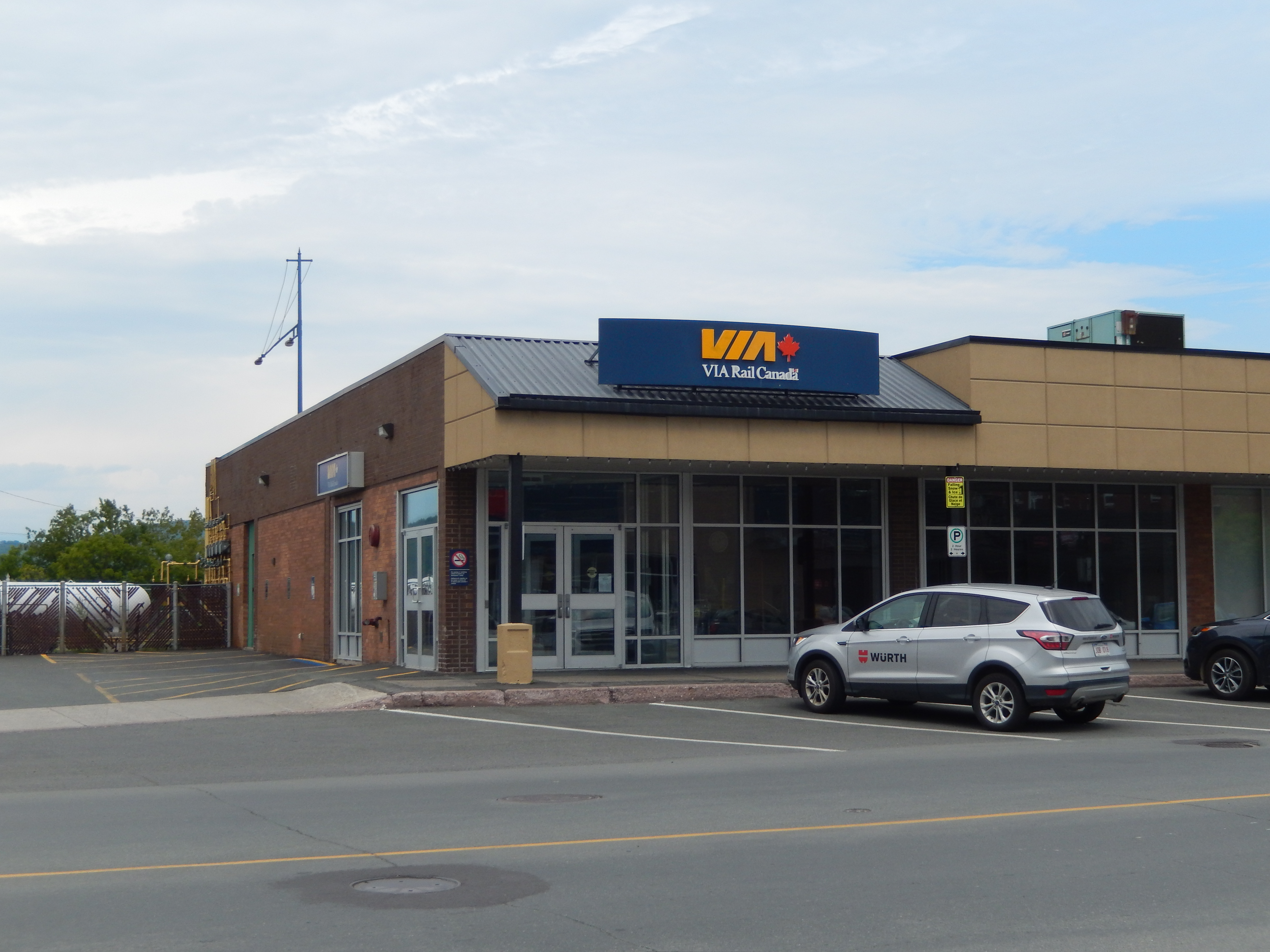
- View of Campbellton's Train Station from Roseberry St

General information
- Location: 99C Roseberry Street; Campbellton, NB; Canada
- Coordinates: 48.004°N 66.680°W
- Owner: Via Rail

Construction
- Parking: Yes

Other information
- Status: Staffed station

Services
| Preceding station | Via Rail | Following station |
|---|---|---|
| Matapédia toward Montreal | Ocean | Charlo toward Halifax |
Former services
| Preceding station | Canadian National Railway | Following station |
|---|---|---|
| Atholville toward Montreal | Montreal – Moncton | McLeon toward Moncton |
| Tide Head toward Edmundston | Edmundston – Campbellton | Terminus |
Location

Campbellton station is located on Roseberry Street near the end of Shannon Street in the city of Campbellton, New Brunswick, Canada. The station is staffed and is wheelchair-accessible. Campbellton is served by Via Rail's Montreal-Halifax train, the Ocean.

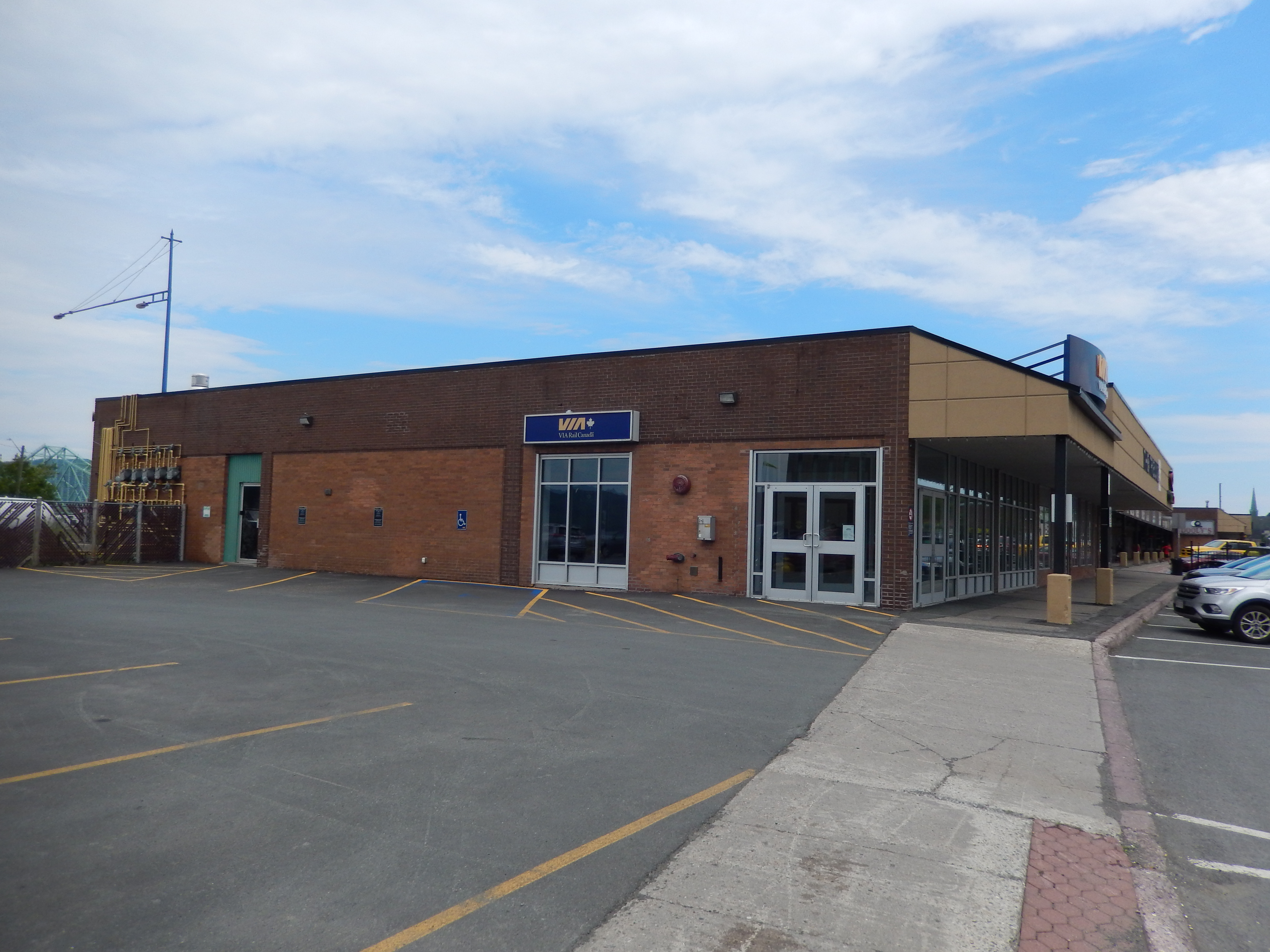
View of Campbellton's Train Station from the side
