= Kouchibouguac =

Kouchibouguac may refer to:

- Kouchibouguac, New Brunswick, a community
- Kouchibouguac National Park, located on the east coast of New Brunswick
- Kouchibouguac River, empties into the Northumberland Strait
- Rogersville-Kouchibouguac, a provincial electoral district
