= Petit Rocher station =

Railway station in New Brunswick, Canada

Petit Rocher
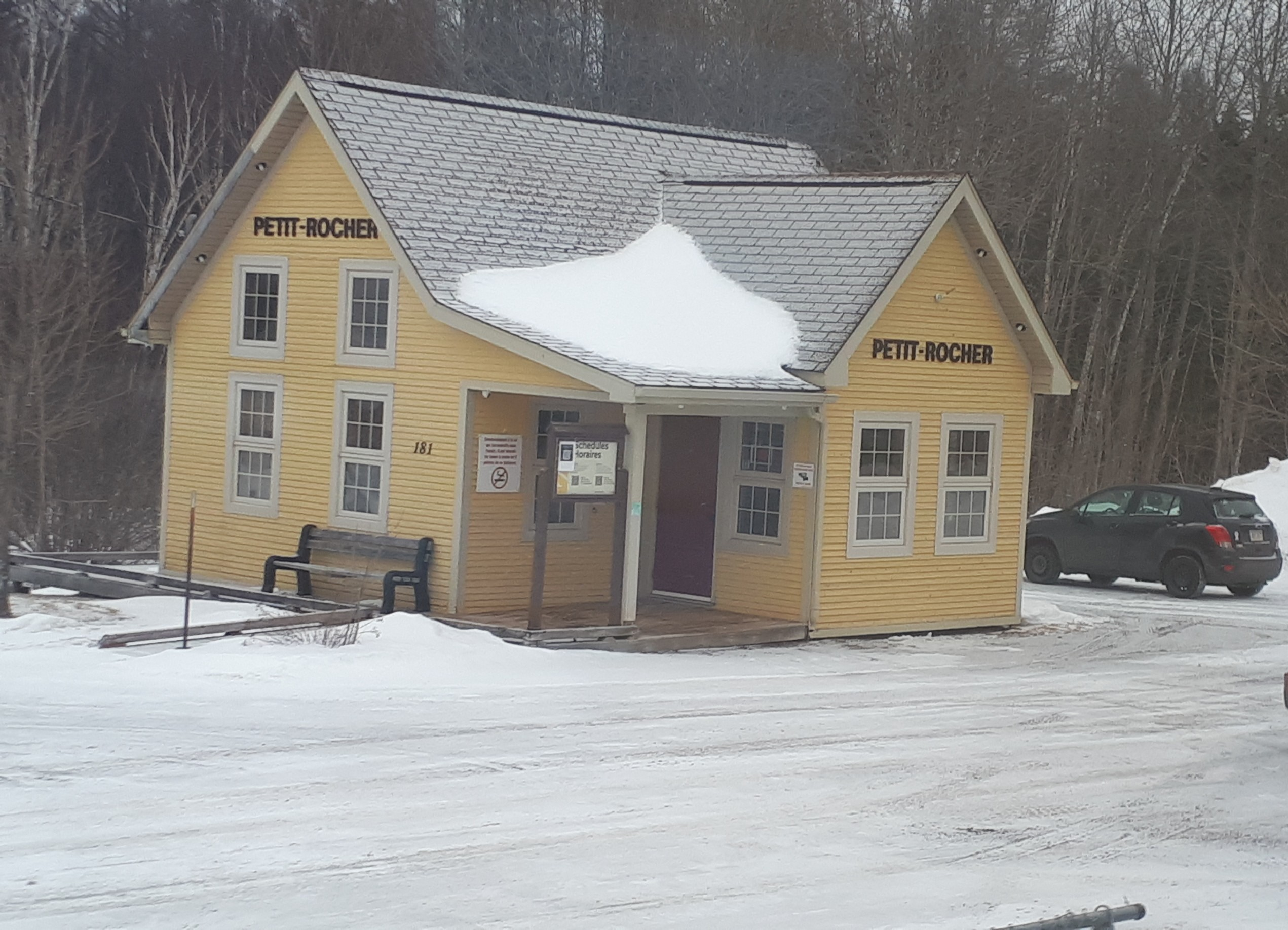
- The new Via Rail flagstop station in Petit Rocher, New Brunswick, Canada, March 1, 2025.

General information
- Location: 183 Rue Laplante O Petit Rocher, New Brunswick; Canada
- Coordinates: 47°46′44″N 65°43′48″W
- Platforms: 1 side platform
- Tracks: 1

Construction
- Structure type: Flag Stop Station
- Parking: Yes

Services
Preceding station	Via Rail	Following station
Jacquet River toward Montreal	Ocean	Bathurst toward Halifax
Former services
Preceding station	Canadian National Railway	Following station
Elm Tree toward Montreal	Montreal – Moncton	Beresford toward Moncton
Location

The Petit Rocher station is a flag stop Via Rail station in the village of Petit Rocher, New Brunswick, Canada. Petit Rocher is served by Via Rail's Montreal–Halifax train, the Ocean.

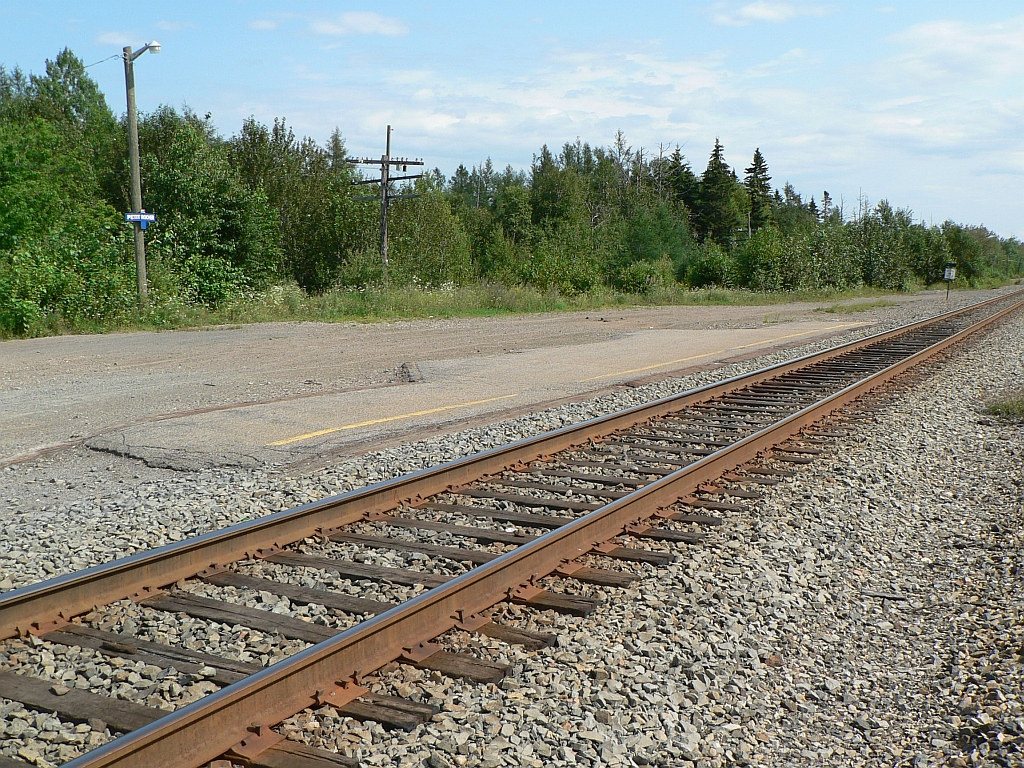
Station platform after original station was demolished, 2006

Located 1 kilometre west of the village, the original station was demolished in the early 1990s due to its poor condition and lack of maintenance, leaving the stop with only a small platform. A new station was announced in 2008 and constructed in 2010. It cost $160,000. The retro design is inspired by the station master's residence which used to occupy the site.
