= Charlo station =

Railway station in New Brunswick, Canada

Coordinates: 47°59′40″N 66°18′20″W

Charlo
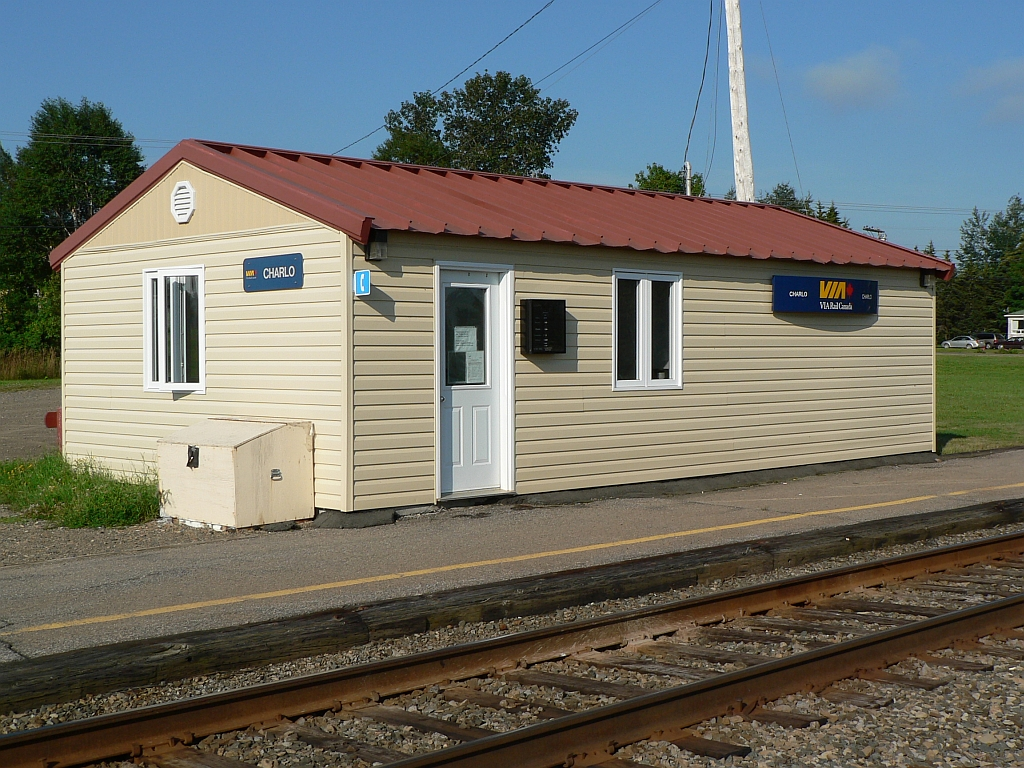
- The Via Rail flagstop station in Charlo, New Brunswick, Canada. Photographed on July 31, 2006.

General information
- Location: Charlo, New Brunswick
- Platforms: 1 side platform
- Tracks: 1

Construction
- Structure type: Sign post
- Parking: Yes
- Cycle facilities: Yes

Services
Preceding station	Via Rail	Following station
Campbellton toward Montreal	Ocean	Jacquet River toward Halifax
Former services
Preceding station	Canadian National Railway	Following station
Eel River toward Montreal	Montreal – Moncton	New Mills toward Moncton
Location

The Charlo station is a flag stop Via Rail station in the village of Charlo, New Brunswick, Canada. Charlo is served by Via Rail's Montreal-Halifax train, the Ocean.

The station was demolished, along with nearby Jacquet River station, in October 2021. The platform remains in use as a flag stop station where VIA Rail's Ocean stops on request.
