= Fundy Biosphere Reserve =

UNESCO Biosphere Region in New Brunswick, Canada

Fundy Biosphere Region
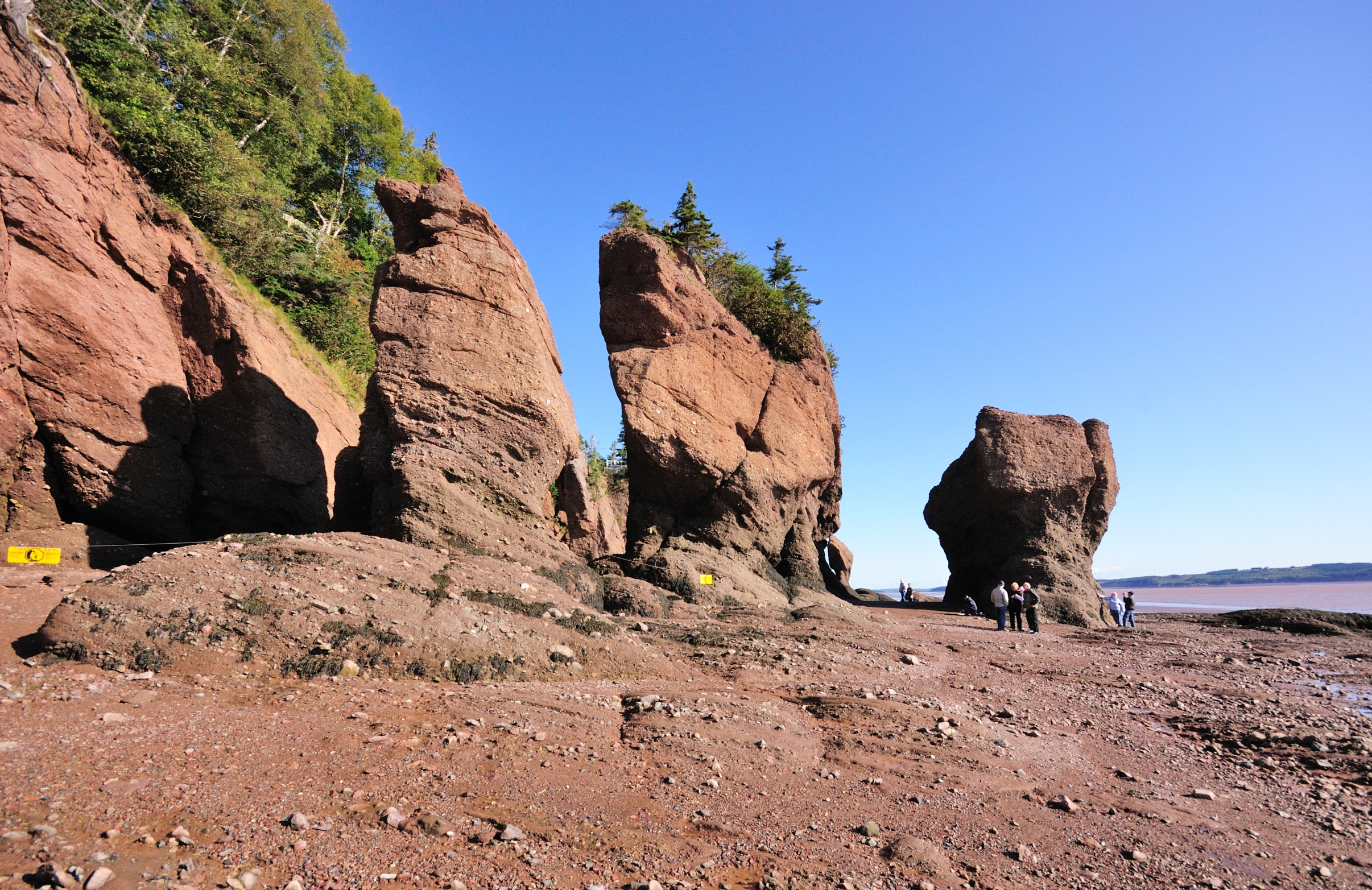
- Hopewell Rocks

- Location within New Brunswick Location within Canada
- Location: New Brunswick, Canada
- Coordinates: 45°55′12″N 65°10′48″W
- Area: 442,250 hectares (1,092,800 acres)
- Established: 2007

The Fundy Biosphere Region is an area of rugged woodlands and coastline that lies along next the upper Bay of Fundy in New Brunswick, Canada. The area covers 442,250 hectares, and was named and designated as a biosphere reserve by the United Nations Educational, Scientific and Cultural Organization (UNESCO) in 2007.

The Fundy Biosphere Region is a community-based environmental non-profit organization whose mission is based on the conservation of biodiversity and the promotion of sustainable development within the Bay of Fundy Canada.

Hopewell Rocks is a provincial park located within the Bay of Fundy, Canada.

== Geography ==
The Fundy Biosphere Region lies in south-eastern New Brunswick. It includes the watershed of the Bay of Fundy between Saint Martins and borders Nova Scotia. The central area of the reserve corresponds with Fundy National Park. The reserve also includes the city of Moncton, the only officially bilingual city in Canada.

The reserve lies on the Bay of Fundy, which has one of the largest tidal ranges on earth.

The Fundy Biosphere Region extends over an area of over 442,250 hectares adjacent to the upper Bay of Fundy in New Brunswick. The region begins at Saint Martin's, passes through Moncton, including almost all of Albert County, and ends at the Tantramar Marsh, close to Sackville. The borders of the region follow the limits of the watershed of the upper region of the Bay of Fundy.

The region is divided into three zones. The core area covers 20,600 hectares devoted to long-term conservation. This central region is represented by Fundy National Park. It has a buffer zone of 26,124 hectares. Human activity in this zone is controlled to ensure the conservation of the core area. The buffer zone includes the protected natural areas of Little Salmon River, Dowdall Lake, McManus Hill, Point Wolfe River Gorge, Caledonia Gorge, and Wilson Brook, and provincial parks including the Fundy Trail and the Hopewell Rocks, and the National Wildlife Areas of Shepody and Tantramar. Most of the region is a transition area, covering 395,552 hectares. This is reserved for local activities that promote sustainable development.

== Biology and ecology ==
The reserve contains a variety of habitats, including mixed wood forests, tidal mudflats, and salt marshes. Like much of this part of the North American coastline, the coastline is rocky. UNESCO has identified 8 species in the reserve that require conservation efforts, including the peregrine falcon and the Canada lynx.

== History ==
The initiative to create the Fundy Biosphere Region came from a group of volunteers in 1999. Initially, the project was called the Fundy Biosphere Reserve Initiative. A planning committee was formed to examine the requirements of UNESCO's Man and the Biosphere Programme, to work with the Canadian Biosphere Reserves Association, and seek input from conservation groups, resources sectors, academic institutions, and scientists.

The committee suggested that the region be called the Fundy Biosphere and secured UNESCO designation by meeting the requirements, which included evidence of unique ecosystems, landscapes, and heritage. The committee also sought to enhance the image of the area regionally, nationally, and internationally, and to encourage the development of a sustainable economy in the region.

The planning committee's proposition was based on the following:

- Identify the special landscapes in the region of the Bay of Fundy and their unique attributes;
- Identify the history and the culture of the region;
- Identify citizen initiatives and the various stakeholders’ engagement in the sustainable development of the region.

The final proposition was submitted to UNESCO in the summer of 2007, and the official designation was obtained on November 21, 2007, after which the Board of Directors established the structure of the organization. The project was renamed the Fundy Biosphere Reserve, and later the Fundy Biosphere Region.

== See also ==
- List of UNESCO Biosphere Reserves in Canada
