= Martin Head (New Brunswick) =

Headland in New Brunswick, Canada

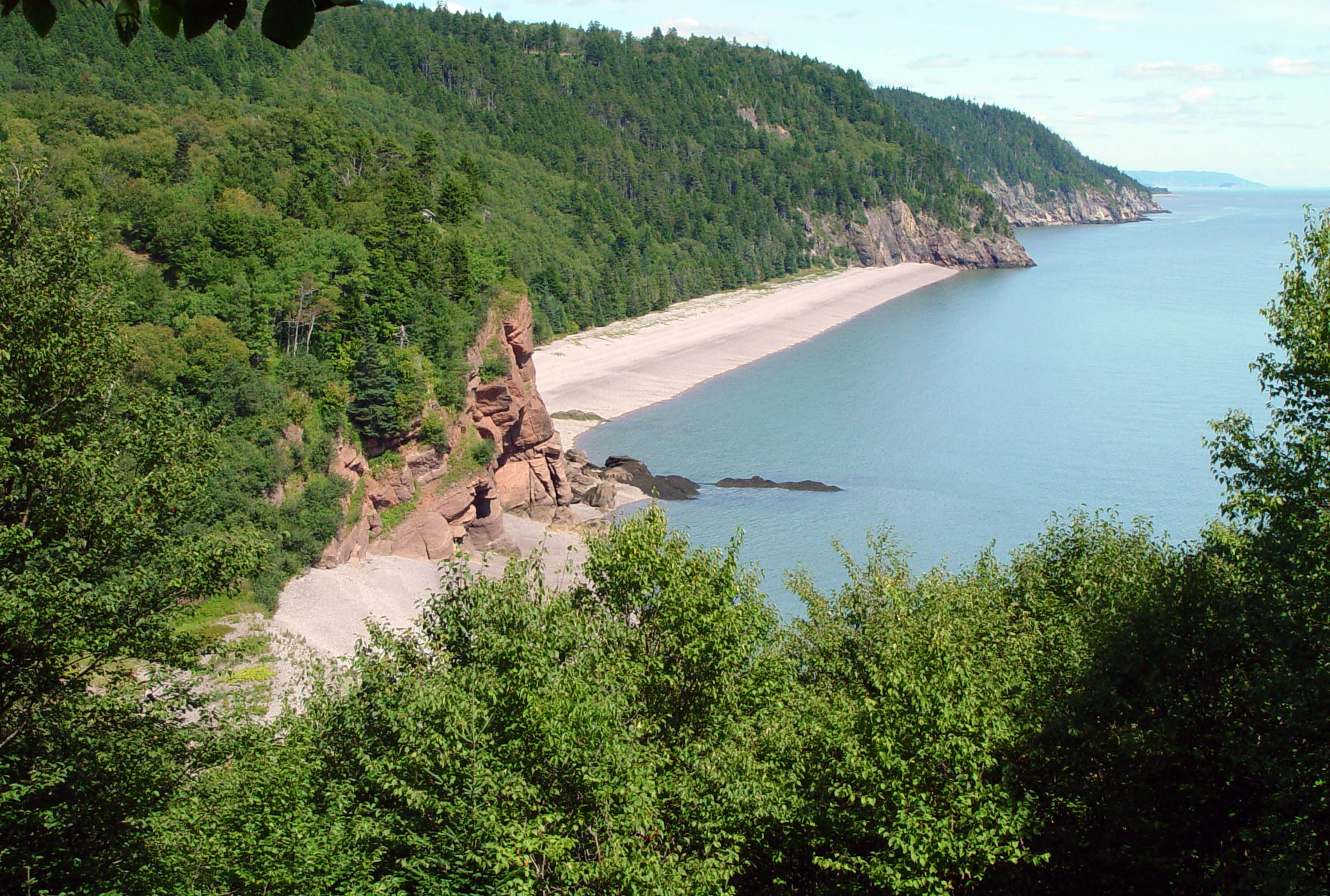
- Coastline above Martin's Head (2007)
- Interactive map of Martin Head

Geography
- Location: Bay of Fundy
- Coordinates: 45°29′18″N 65°11′22″W

Administration
- Canada
- Province: New Brunswick
- County: Saint John
- Parish: Saint Martins

Martin Head is a headland in the Saint Martins Parish, Saint John County, New Brunswick, Canada. There is a grave, and the remnants of an old lighthouse at Martin Head. The lighthouse was destroyed around 1965.

== Origin of name ==
On the 1686 map by De Meulles, it is listed as Anchaque, Blackmore's 1713 map named it Little James which was repeated and translated to "Jacques" on many later maps, and Bellin's 1744 map labeled it Isle de Chaque.

While William Francis Ganong felt the origin of the current name was likely tied to St. Martin, namesake of the parish, he acknowledged that Bommer's 1820 map had it listed as simply "Martins Head" and later maps such as the 1824 Admiralty chart and Baillie's map of 1832 called it St. Martin's Head. Ganong also wrote that he was told by Micmac chief Mark Paul that Martins Head represented the boundary between Micmac and Maliseet tribes.

== History ==
In 1785, land grants were made on Martin's Head, although settlement did not come until later.

In 1794, the 104th (New Brunswick) Regiment of Foot put a manned signal station on Martin's Head. In 1800, Sgt McFarling noted the construction of a telegraph from Martin's Head to Sussex Vale, so O. H. Clements' quarters would be connected to secure the bay.

As of 1886, a compressed air foghorn was operated on Martin's Head, sounding 14-second blasts in thick fog with intervals of 46 seconds - housed in an oblong white wooden building with a pitched roof.
