= Big Salmon River Suspension Bridge =

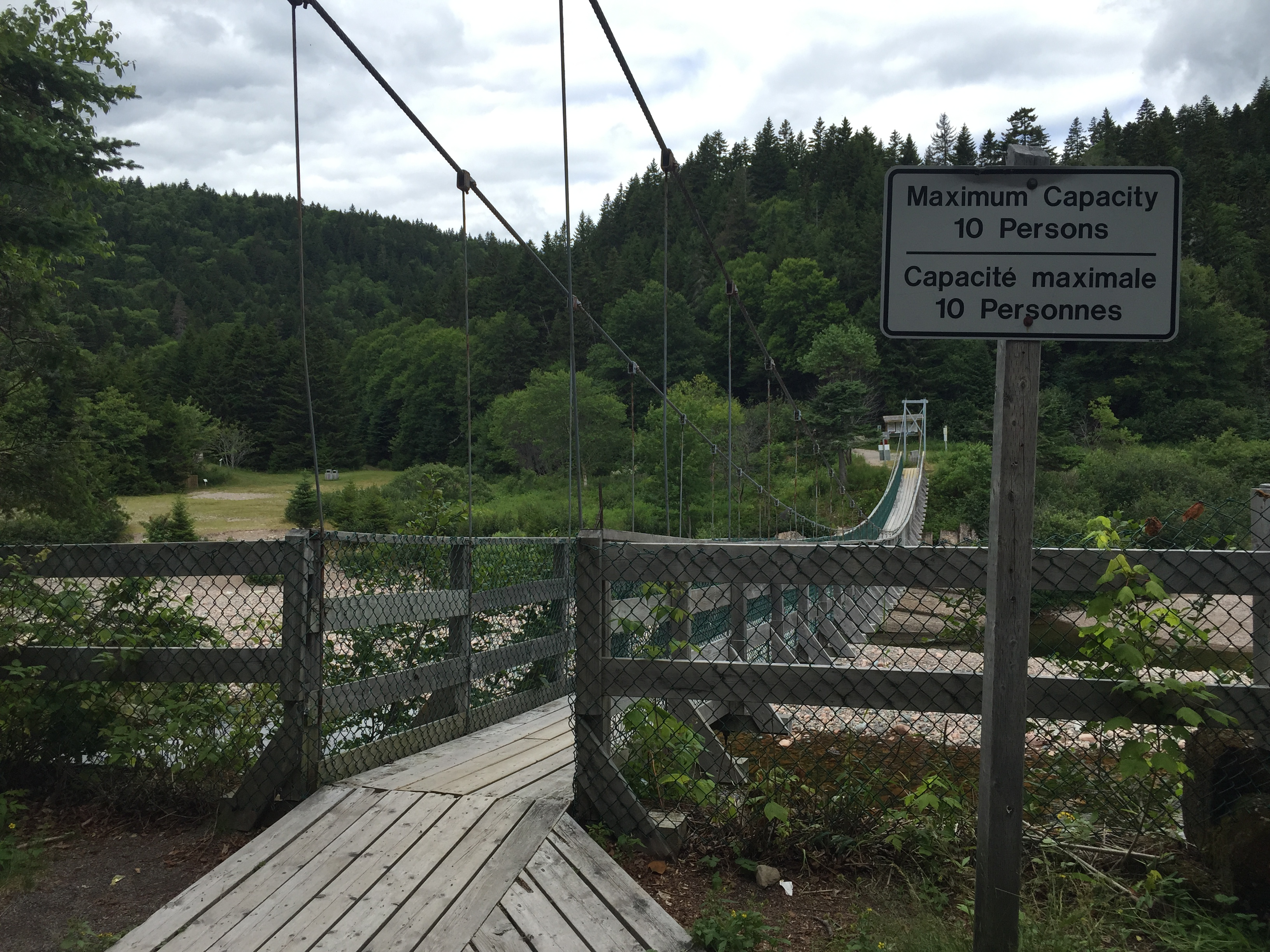
- Big Salmon River Suspension bridge, taken from the North side.
- Coordinates: 45°25′21.7″N 65°24′33.6″W
- Crosses: Big Salmon River (New Brunswick)
- Locale: Fundy-St. Martins

Characteristics
- Total length: 275 feet (84 m)

History
- Replaces: Big Salmon River Covered Bridge

Location
- Interactive map of Big Salmon River Suspension Bridge

Big Salmon River Suspension Bridge is a suspension footbridge in New Brunswick, Canada. It was built in 1974 and measures 84m in length. It spans the Big Salmon River, a small river which flows into the Bay of Fundy near Fundy-St. Martins.

The suspension bridge can be accessed by the Suspension Bridge Trail. This trail begins at the Fundy Trail Parkway parking area P8 near the Mitchell Franklin Bridge.

== History ==
Before the suspension bridge was built, a covered bridge existed in its place.
