= Saint Martins Parish, New Brunswick =

Saint Martins St. Martins
- Parish
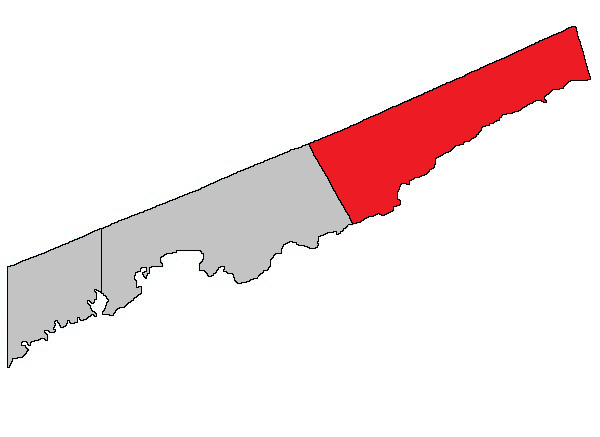
- Location within Saint John County. map erroneously shows Saint John as part of Simonds Parish
- Coordinates: 45.36°N 65.54°W
- Country: Canada
- Province: New Brunswick
- County: Saint John County
- Erected: 1786

Area
  - Land: 629.00 km^{2} (242.86 sq mi)

Population (2021)
  - Total: 1,177
  - Density: 1.9/km^{2} (4.9/sq mi)
  - Change 2016-2021: ▲4.0%
  - Dwellings: 597
- Time zone: UTC-4 (AST)
  - Summer (DST): UTC-3 (ADT)
- Median Income*: $53,675 CDN
- Median household total income, 2015 (all households) Figures do not include portion with the village of St. Martins

Saint Martins is a geographic parish in Saint John County, New Brunswick, Canada. (Note: The Territorial Division Act divides the province into 152 parishes, the cities of Saint John and Fredericton, and one town of Grand Falls. The Interpretation Act clarifies that parishes include any local government within their borders.)

For governance purposes the bulk of the parish is divided between the village of Fundy-St. Martins and the Fundy rural district, both of which are members of the Fundy Regional Service Commission. A minor portion on the east resides in Fundy Albert, which is a member of the Southeast Regional Service Commission.

Prior to the 2023 governance reform, the parish was divided for governance purposes between the village of St. Martins and the local service district of the parish of Saint Martins, both of which were members of the Fundy Regional Service Commission (FRSC).

== Origin of name ==
The Provincial Archives of New Brunswick gives only a possibility - St. Martins, Maryland, which could refer to either Saint Martin or Saint Martins by the Bay, both in Worcester County, Maryland.

== History ==
Saint Martins was erected in 1786 as one of the county's original parish.

In 1837 the eastern end of Saint Martins was transferred to Westmorland County. The lost area is now part of Alma Parish in Albert County.

== Boundaries ==
Saint Martins Parish is bounded:

- on the north by the Kings County line;
- on the east by the Albert County line;
- on the south by the Bay of Fundy and Quaco Bay;
- on the west by a line beginning at the shore of the Bay of Fundy and running northwesterly along the eastern line of a grant to Samuel Hugh at the mouth of Tynemouth Creek and its prolongation to the Kings County line.

== Communities ==
Communities at least partly within the parish. bold indicates an incorporated municipality

- Bains Corner
- Bay View
- Burchills Flats
- Chester
- Fair View
- Grove Hill
- Hanford Brook
- Hardingville
- Little Beach
- Orange Hill
- Porter Road
- **St. Martins**
- Salmon River
- Shanklin
- Tynemouth Creek
- West Quaco

== Bodies of water ==
Bodies of water (Note: Not including brooks, ponds or coves.) at least partly within the parish.

- Big Salmon River
- Goose River
- Irish River
- Little Salmon River
- Mosher River
- Point Wolfe River
- Quiddy River
- South Stream
- Goose Creek
- Ten Mile Creek
- Tynemouth Creek
- Bay of Fundy
- Quaco Bay
- more than two dozen officially named lakes

== Other notable places ==
Parks, historic sites, and other noteworthy places at least partly within the parish.

- Big Salmon River Protected Natural Area
- Dowdall Lake Protected Natural Area
- Fundy National Park
- Fundy Footpath
- Fundy Trail Parkway Provincial Park
- Little Salmon River Protected Natural Area
- Point Wolfe River Gorge Protected Natural Area
- Saddleback Brook Protected Natural Area

== Demographics ==
Parish population total does not include village of St. Martins

=== Population ===
Population trend

Census	Population	Change (%)
2016	1,132	▼1.1%
2011	1,145	▼4.4%
2006	1,198	▼4.0%
2001	1,248	▼2.8%
1996	1,284	▲7.1%
1991	1,199	▲5.9%
1986	1,132	N/A

=== Language ===
Mother tongue (2016)

Language	Population	Pct (%)
French only	25	2.2%
English only	1,105	97.8%
Both English and French	0	0%
Other languages	0	0%

== Access Routes ==
Highways and numbered routes that run through the parish, including external routes that start or finish at the parish limits:

- **Highways**
  - Route 111
- **Principal Routes**
  - None
- Secondary Routes:
  - None
- External Routes:
  - None

== See also ==
- List of parishes in New Brunswick
