= Big Salmon River (New Brunswick) =

River in New Brunswick, Canada

Coordinates: 45°25′N 65°24′W

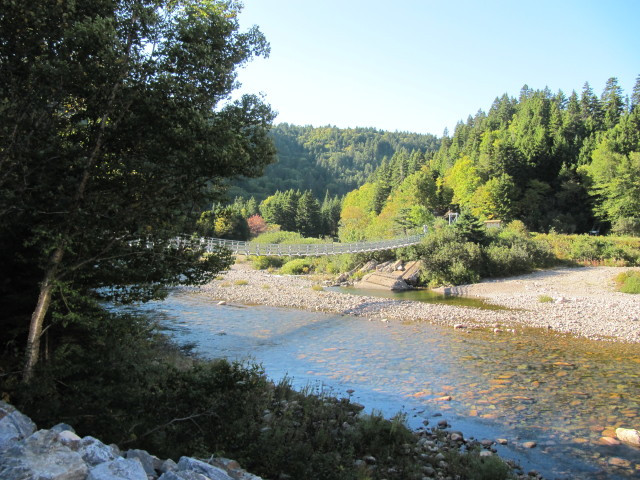
Suspension bridge over the Big Salmon River

The Big Salmon River (French: Grande rivière Salmon) is a small river in southern New Brunswick, Canada, that flows south into the Bay of Fundy. The river has its source to the southwest of Sussex, New Brunswick. The river flows into the Bay of Fundy near Fundy-St. Martins, and serves as the endpoint of the Fundy Trail.

The 84m Big Salmon River Suspension Bridge crosses the river. It can be accessed by the Suspension Bridge Trail. This trail begins at the Fundy Trail Parkway parking area P8 near the Mitchell Franklin Bridge.

== See also ==
- List of rivers of New Brunswick
