= Hopewell Cape Formation =

Geological formation of Carboniferous age in New Brunswick

- Stratigraphic range: Viséan to Namurian or Westphalian
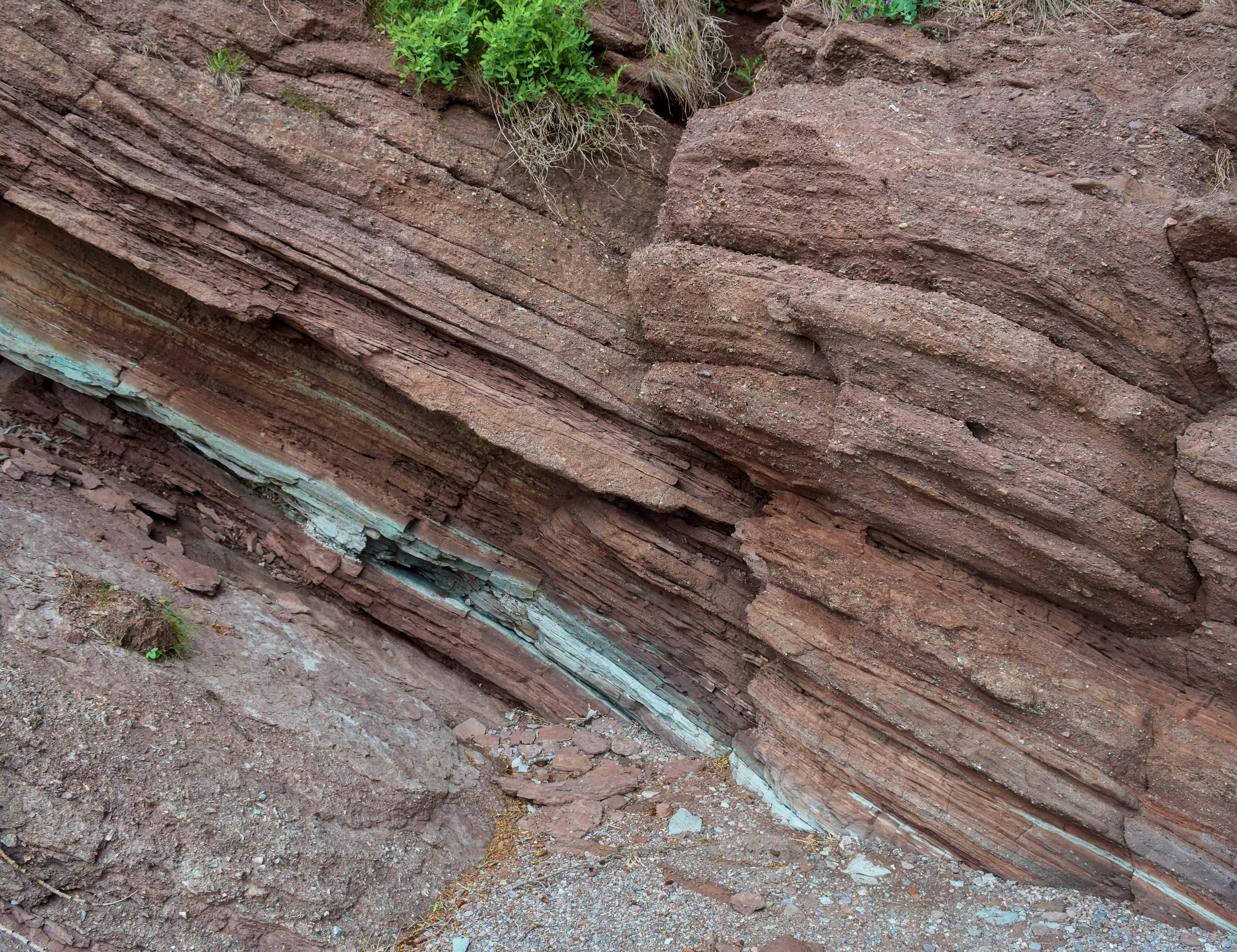
- Hopewell Cape Formation outcropping at the Hopewell Rocks Provincial Park.
- Type: Geological formation
- Underlies: Boss Point Formation
- Overlies: Windsor Group
- Thickness: Less than 1,000 metres (3,280 ft)

Lithology
- Primary: Conglomerate
- Other: Sandstone, mudstone

Location
- Region: New Brunswick
- Country: Canada

Type section
- Named for: Hopewell Cape
- Named by: H. M. Ami
- Year defined: 1902

The Hopewell Cape Formation is a geological formation of Carboniferous age (late Viséan to late Namurian or early Westphalian stage) in New Brunswick.
