= St. Martins, New Brunswick =

St. Martins
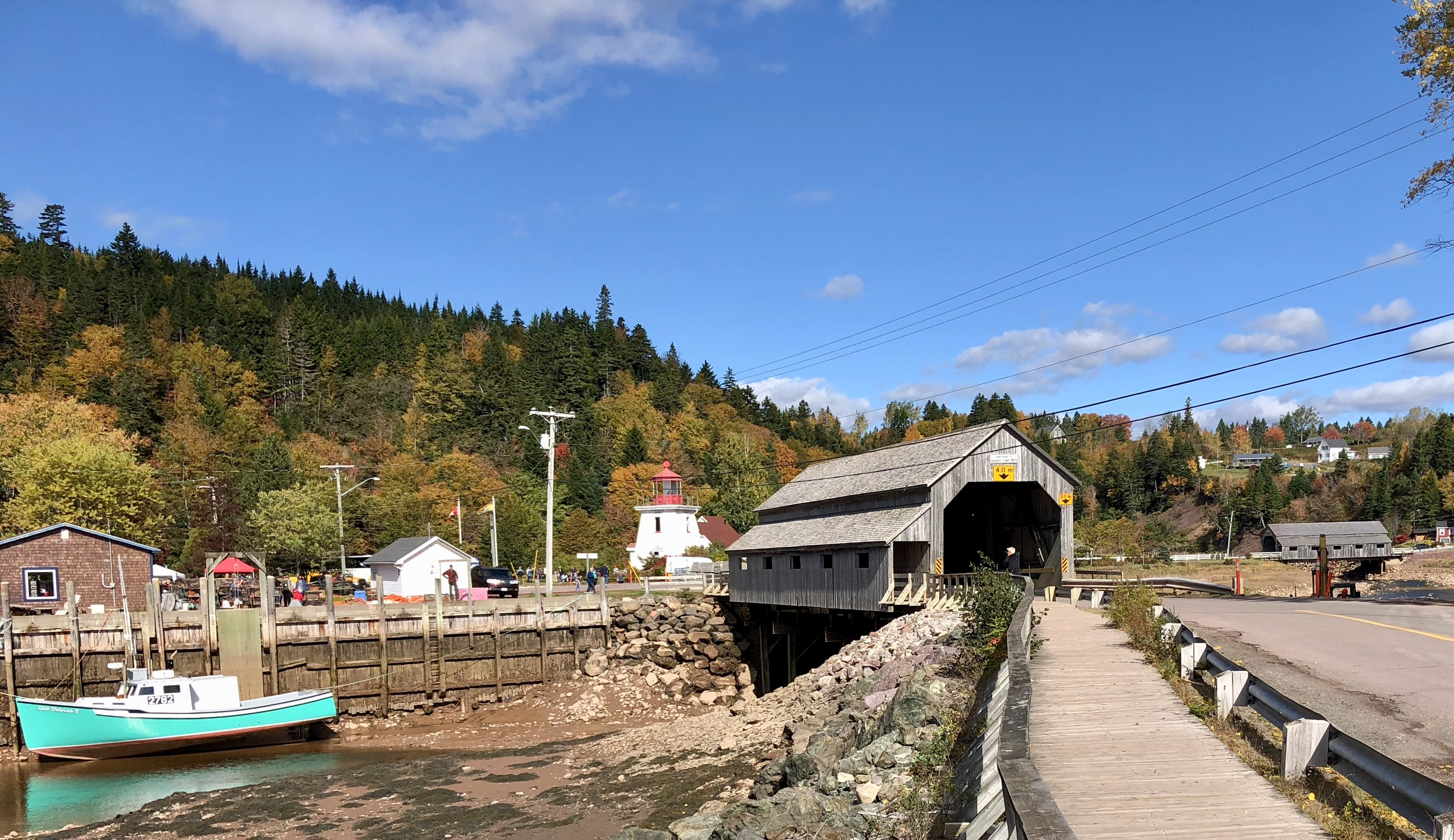
- St. Martins and its twin covered bridges

- Location of St. Martins in New Brunswick St. Martins (Canada)
- Coordinates: 45°21′1.6″N 65°32′2.3″W
- Country: Canada
- Province: New Brunswick
- County: Saint John County
- Parish: Saint Martins Parish
- Municipality: Fundy-St. Martins

Area
  - Land: 2.35 km^{2} (0.91 sq mi)

Population (2021)
  - Total: 320
  - Density: 136.1/km^{2} (352/sq mi)
  - Change 2016–21: ▲15.9%
- Time zone: UTC-4 (Atlantic)
  - Summer (DST): UTC-3 (ADT)
- Area code: 506
- Website: www.stmartinscanada.com
- Quaco Head Lighthouse
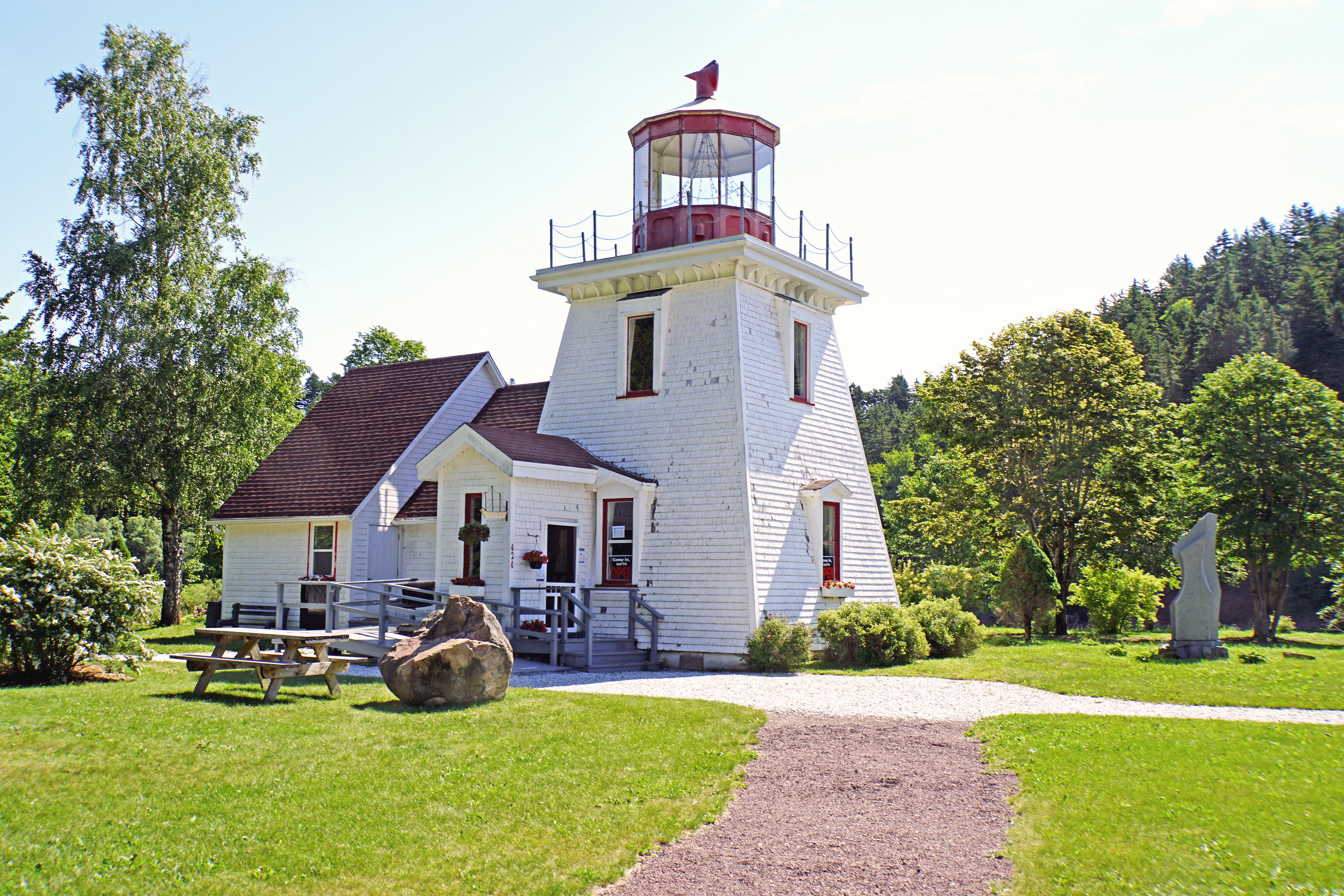
- Constructed: 1835 (first); 1883 (second)
- Foundation: Concrete base
- Construction: Concrete tower (current)
- Height: 11 m (36 ft)
- Shape: Quadrangular tower with balcony and lantern
- Markings: White tower, red lantern
- Power source: solar power
- Operator: Canadian Coast Guard
- Fog signal: 3s. blast every 30s.
- First lit: 1966 (current)
- Deactivated: 1881 (first, destroyed by fire); 1966 (second)
- Focal height: 26 m (85 ft)
- Range: 21 nmi (39 km; 24 mi)
- Characteristic: Fl W 10s

St. Martins is a community on the Bay of Fundy now part of the village of Fundy-St. Martins, Canada.

The village was founded as Quaco by 1783 by soldiers from the disbanded loyalist King's Orange Rangers. It was incorporated in 1967. Led by shipbuilders such as James Moran, it was the third most productive shipbuilding town in the Maritimes, producing over 500 ships. Shipbuilding declined after the 1870s and today tourism is the major industry.

On 1 January 2023, province-wide local government reforms caused for the Village of St. Martins to annex all or part of Fairfield, Simonds, Upham, and Hampton local service districts, reforming the village boundaries under the new name Fundy-St. Martins. The former village's name remains in official use.

== Attractions ==
Attractions in St. Martins include the St. Martins Sea Caves, the beach and tidal harbour, the start of the Fundy Trail, two covered bridges and the Quaco Head Lighthouse, the Quaco Museum and Library, and the Fundy Trail Parkway.

== Demographics ==
Historical Census Data - St. Martins, New Brunswick
Year	Pop.	±%
2006	386	—
2011	314	−18.7%
2016	276	−12.1%
2021	320	+15.9%

In the 2021 Census of Population conducted by Statistics Canada, St. Martins had a population of 320 living in 157 of its 194 total private dwellings, a change of 15.9% from its 2016 population of 276. With a land area of 2.35 km^{2} (0.91 sq mi), it had a population density of 136.2/km^{2} (352.7/sq mi) in 2021.

== Gallery ==
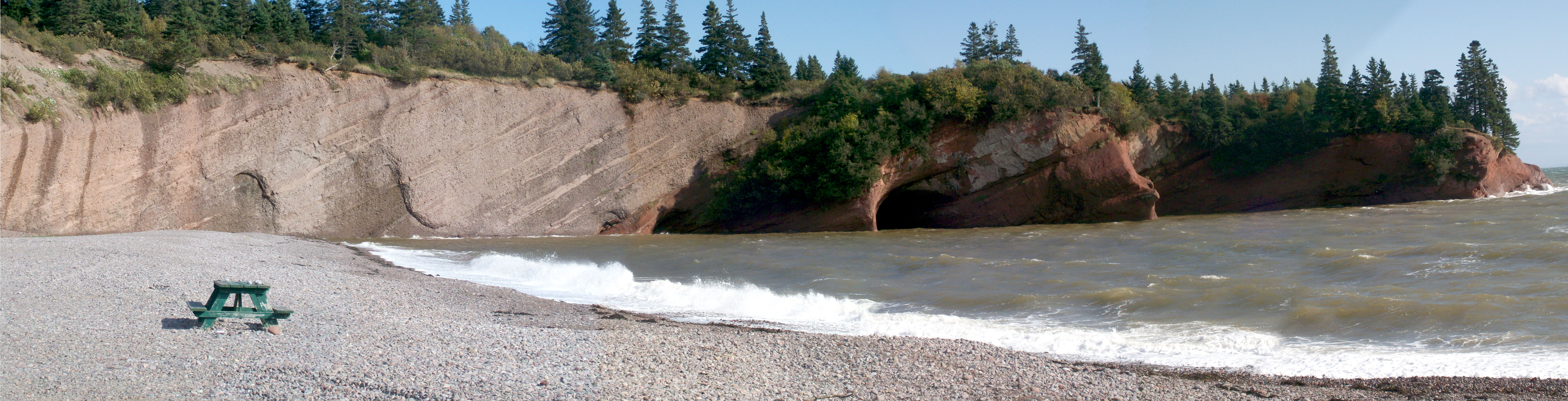
St. Martins' Caves

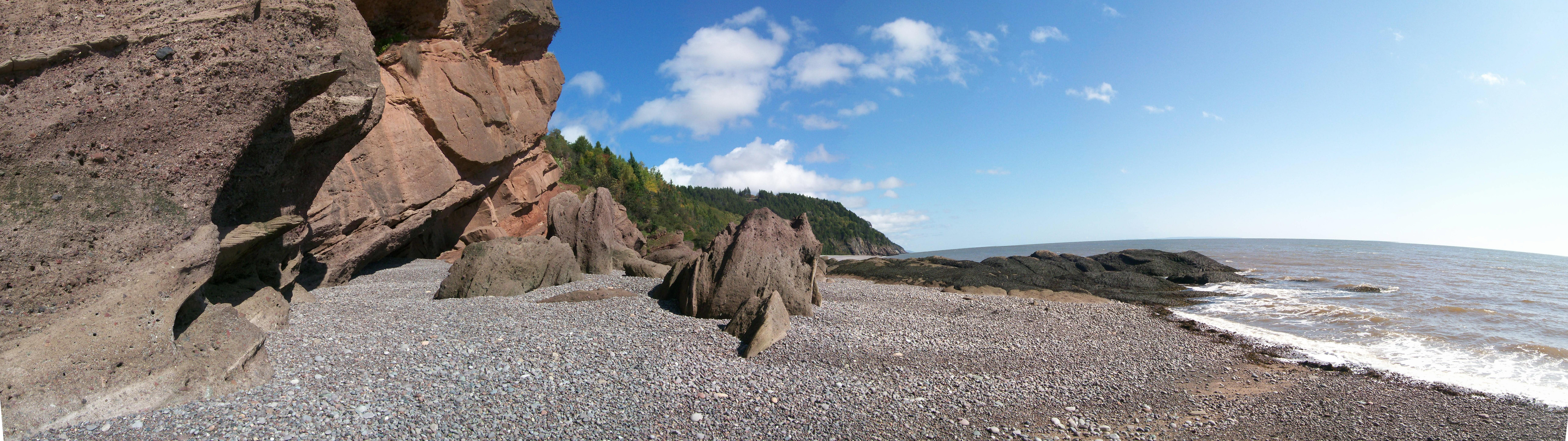
Fundy Trail

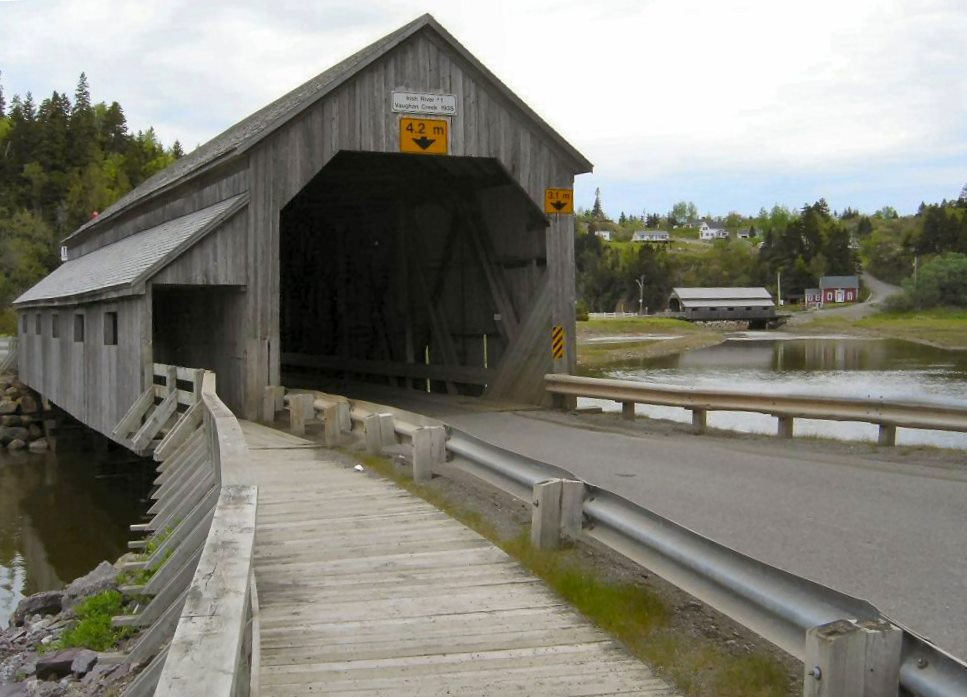
Twin covered bridges

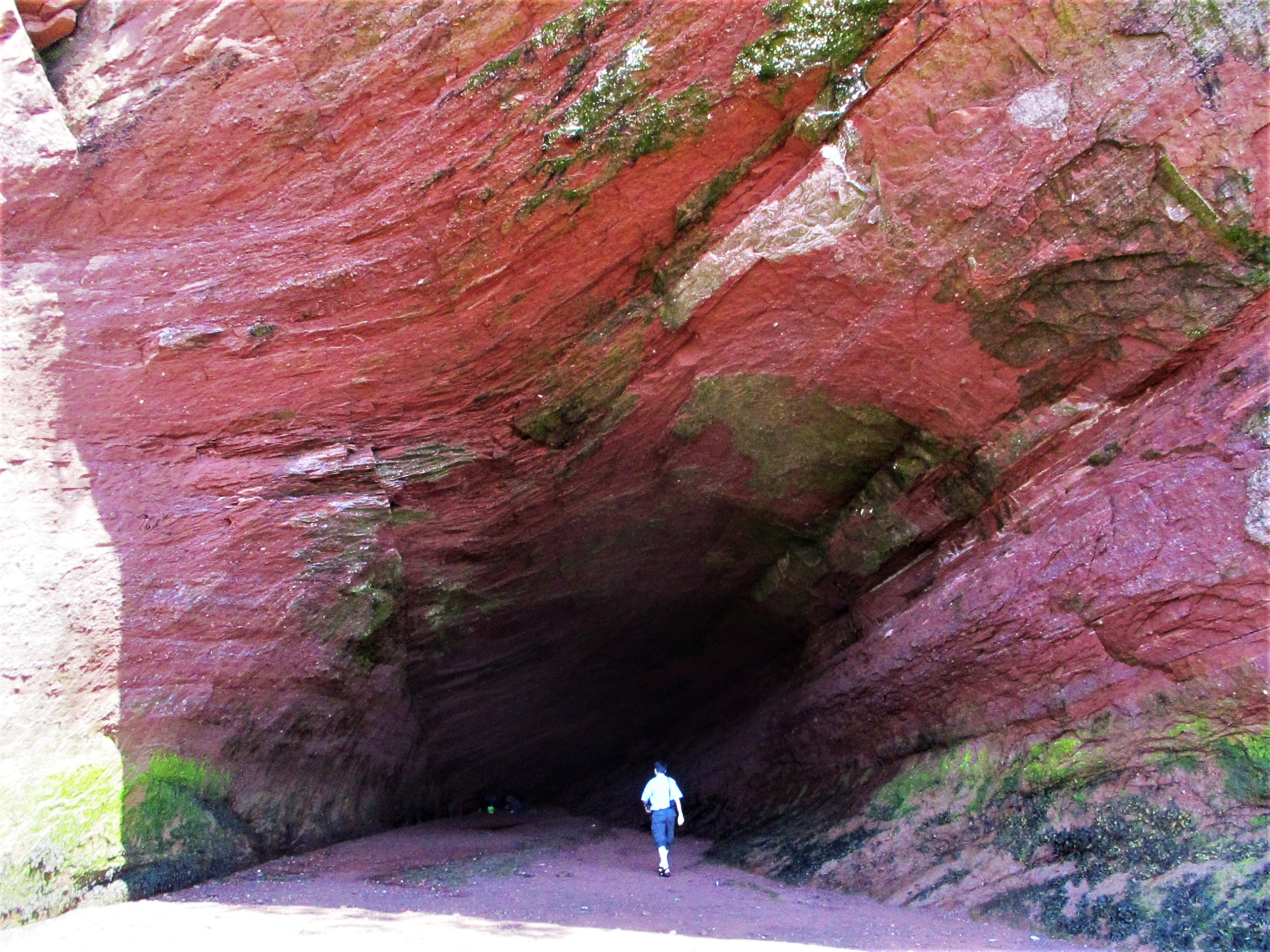
St Martins Sea Cave

== See also ==
- List of lighthouses in New Brunswick
- List of communities in New Brunswick
- History of New Brunswick
- List of historic places in Saint John County, New Brunswick
