= James Moran (shipbuilder) =

James Moran was a shipbuilder from St. Martins in the Colony, later the province of New Brunswick, Canada, who pioneered shipbuilding in the Bay of Fundy. Moran was one of the two leading families in the shipbuilding era of St. Martins from 1803 to 1919. During this period a number of different families built ships of all sizes along the beaches of St. Martins, building about 517 ships. He was the son of Matthias (Matthew) Moran. In order for a shipbuilding family to function the support of a wife was needed. James married Mary Hamilton; they had two sons, Robert and James H. Robert went on to be a master mariner, while James H. became a junior shipbuilder and later worked alongside his father, eventually taking over the business. In 1805 James, at the age of 24, built and launched his first small ship, a 59-ton schooner named Thistle. The ship that Moran is best known for is Waterloo, a 392-ton ship built in 1815 and the first three-masted square-rigged ship built in the Bay of Fundy.

James built ships and operated a shipyard for over four decades. During his life he built at least 20 ships, the first ones being of smaller tonnage. Between 1840 and the late 1850s James was one of the leading shipbuilders in the Fundy area. In 1856 his son James H. took over the shipyard, which later expanded to Saint John, New Brunswick. The Morans had one of Atlantic Canada's largest fleets during the 1870s. By 1874 about 88 ships had been built, mostly over 1,000 tons.
