= Quiddy River =

Watercourse in New Brunswick, Canada

The Quiddy River is located in the south part of New Brunswick, Canada. It starts at about 45.61°N 65.22°W and travels approximately 13 kilometres (8.1 mi) before emptying into the Bay of Fundy at 45°29′29″N 65°11′40″W. At its mouth, it becomes part of two large salt marshes that lie on either side of the river. The river is home to many species of New Brunswick's wildlife.

One of the more historic communities on the Quiddy River was Martin Head, located at the mouth. Martin Head was a small town that relied on the flow of the river as well as the changing tides of the Bay of Fundy. As the industry died and the world become more modern, this small community eventually rotted away. Small remnants of one wharf and the foundation of the schoolhouse are the only indications that people once lived there. Martin Head is now a place locals go camping and is one of the most picturesque parts of the Fundy Trail.
