= Fundy Trail Parkway =

Scenic provincial park in Atlantic Canada

The Fundy Trail Provincial Park is a 30 kilometer-long scenic parkway in the Atlantic Canadian province of New Brunswick along the coast of the Bay of Fundy. The parkway provides access to a number of trails and over 20 lookout locations along the coast, including a 10 kilometer pedestrian and bicycle trail, and the Big Salmon River Suspension Bridge. The parkway is also located along five different beaches and four waterfalls. There is also an interpretive centre along the route which provides information about the area's history.

== Points of interest ==
Flowerpot Rock

Flowerpot Rock was a sea stack located along the parkway that was a popular tourist attraction. On February 24, 2022, it collapsed during a winter storm. The rock gets its name from the presence of vegetation that was growing on top of it. It was similar to other sea stacks located nearby at Hopewell Rocks Provincial Park.

Walton Glen Gorge

Formed by a glacier during the last ice age and nicknamed the "Grand Canyon of New Brunswick", Walton Glen Gorge is located in the Little Salmon River Protected Natural Area near the east gate of the parkway. Home to the second highest waterfall in New Brunswick, this panoramic, forested gorge can be both viewed from above via an observation platform and descended into via the "Eye of the Needle" trail.

Long Beach

Long Beach is the largest beach on the parkway and extends for about half a kilometer out into the ocean at low tide, and stretches for 2.5 kilometers along the coast. Visitors can experience walking on the ocean floor due to the extreme tides of the Bay of Fundy. Long Beach Brook enters the ocean here, and a roughly kilometer-long trail follows the brook upstream to a waterfall called Long Beach Brook Falls.
