= João Álvares Fagundes =

Portuguese explorer and shipowner

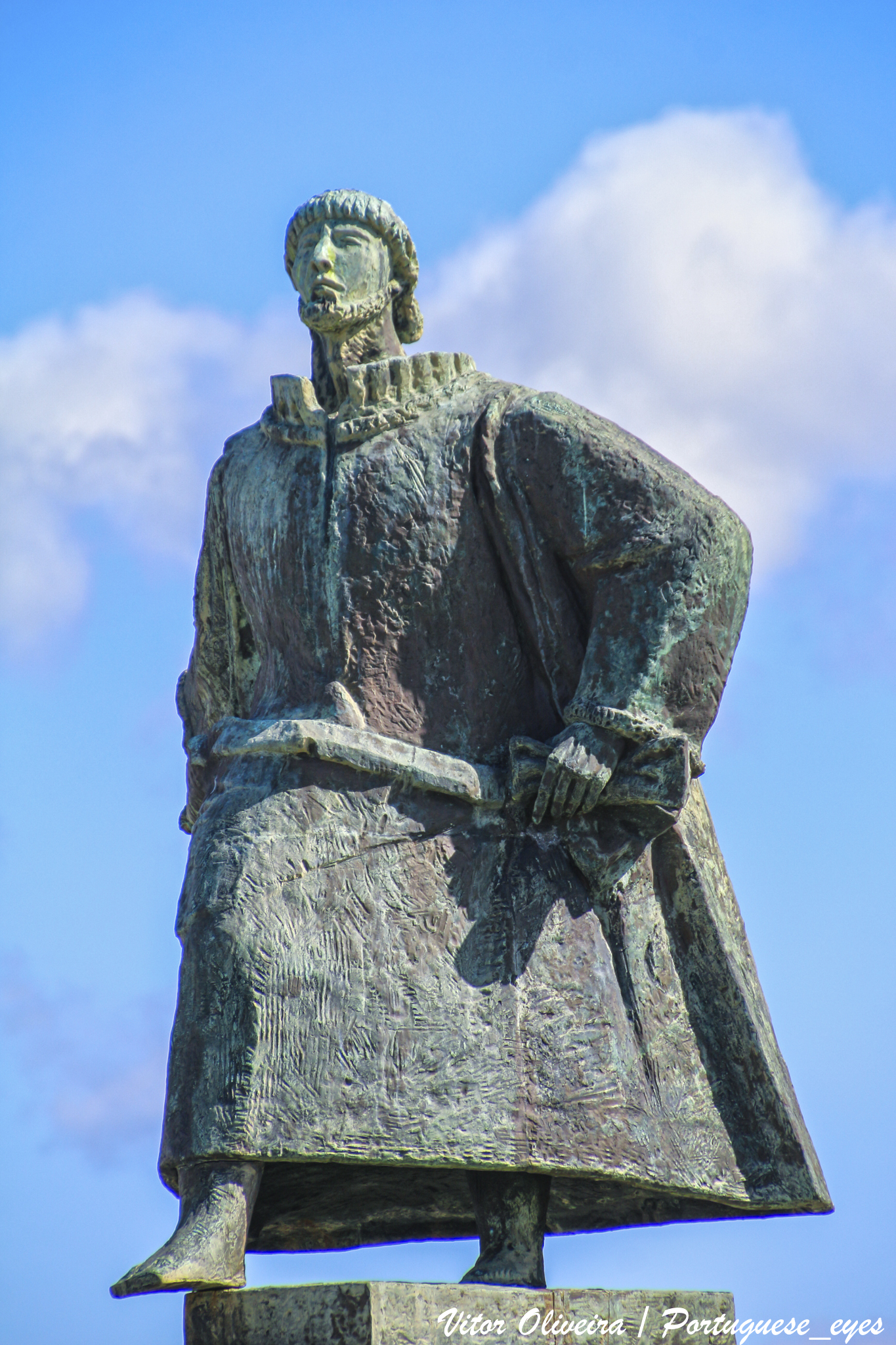
- Statue of Fagundes in Viana do Castelo, Portugal
- Born: c. 1460; Viana do Castelo, Kingdom of Portugal
- Died: December 1522; Viana do Castelo, Kingdom of Portugal
- Occupations: Explorer, ship-owner
- Known for: Expeditions to Newfoundland and Nova Scotia

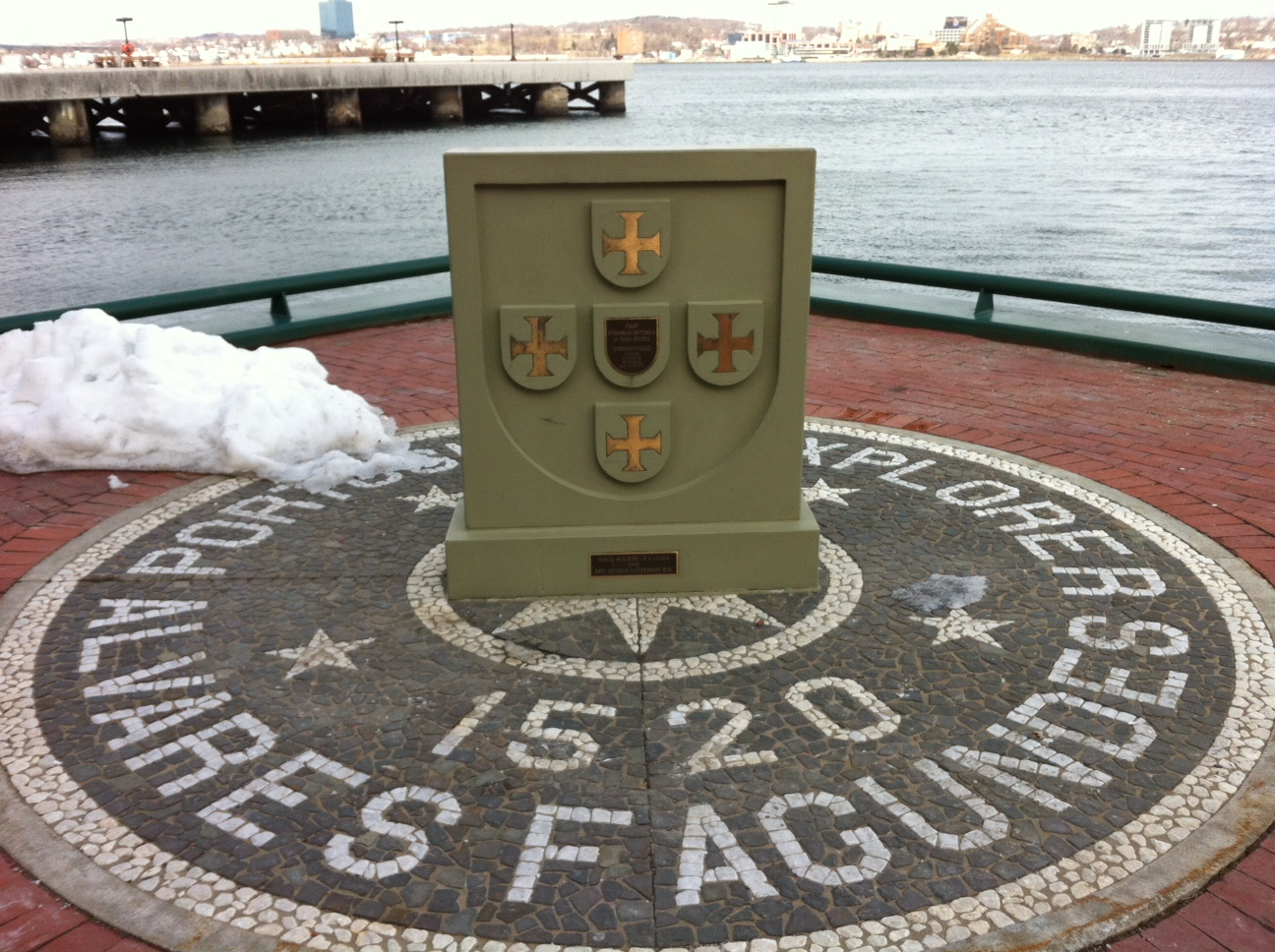
Monument commemorating Fagundes beside Halifax Harbour, Nova Scotia.

João Álvares Fagundes (born c. 1460 – died 1522, Kingdom of Portugal) was an explorer and ship owner from Viana do Castelo in Northern Portugal. He organized several expeditions to Newfoundland and Nova Scotia around 1520–1521.

Fagundes, together with his second captain Pero de Barcelos, and accompanied by colonists (mostly from the Azores and some from mainland Portugal), explored the islands of St Paul near Cape Breton, Sable Island, Penguin Island (now known as Funk Island), Burgeo, and Saint Pierre and Miquelon. He named the latter islands as the Eleven Thousand Virgins, in honor of Saint Ursula.

King Manuel I of Portugal gave Fagundes exclusive rights and ownership of his discoveries on 13 March 1521.

In 1607, Samuel de Champlain identified the remains of a large cross ("an old cross, all covered with moss, and almost wholly rotted away") at what is now Advocate Harbour, Nova Scotia on the Minas Basin. Some historians have attributed the cross to Fagundes, who is presumed to have visited the spot some eight decades earlier.

== Fishing colony of Cape Breton ==
Captain Francisco de Souza (Feitor or governor of the king) of the captaincy of the island of Madeira, and a native of the same island, reported in 1570 that about 45 or 50 years before, "some noblemen [from Viana] joined with the information that they had of the New Land of the Codfish, they were determined to go settle some part of it". They obtained a license From King Manuel for an expedition under the command of João Alvares Fagundes, who led several families and couples, mostly from the Azores, especially from the island of Terceira, who were gathered en route. They reached North America with a nau and a caravel, and "because they considered the coast of Newfoundland very cold, they sailed from east to west" until they reached a new "coast, arranged from northeast to southwest, and there they dwelt, where they lost or ran out of ships". De Souza said that nothing more was known of "the colonists who settled there since they were out of communications with the metropole."

Only later did news of the fate of the colonists come through the reports of Basque fishermen who visited the region. The Basques brought information of the colony and its inhabitants and descendants "and said that they were asked to let the authorities in Portugal know about their situation in the land and to send them priests, because the Gentiles [possibly the Mi'kmaq people] "are peaceful and docile, and from notorious men that are sailing there." According to Souza, it was in Cape Britão (Cape Breton in old Portuguese - already having that name in 1570 due to the expeditions of Jacques Cartier and others), "at the entrance of the north coast, in a beautiful bay", according to the chronicler, "which had a settlement, with very valuable things, and a lot of walnut, chestnut, grapes, and other fruits, where it seems to be good land and so among this company were some couples from the Azores; that they have settled here as is well-known".

The governor of Madeira ended the reference to this colony with a prayer and a plea: "May Our Lord in His mercy pave the way to get them help, and my intention is to go to the said path of coastline when I reach the Island of São Francisco, which we can do on a single trip". This possible colony may have lasted at least until the 1570s, or until the end of the century.

== See also ==
- History of Nova Scotia
