= Bay of Fundy =

Bay on the east coast of North America

- Baie de Fundy
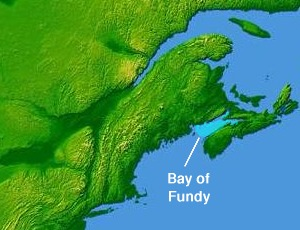
- The Bay of Fundy

- Location within Nova Scotia
- Location: New Brunswick, Nova Scotia, Maine
- Coordinates: 45°00′N 65°45′W
- Type: Estuary
- Etymology: Likely from the French Fendu, meaning "split".
- Primary inflows: Canada and United States
- River sources: Big Salmon, Magaguadavic, Memramcook, Petitcodiac, Quiddy, Saint John, St. Croix, Upper Salmon, Annapolis, Avon, Cornwallis, Farrells, Salmon, Shubenacadie, Kennetcook
- Primary outflows: Gulf of Maine
- Ocean/sea sources: Atlantic Ocean
- Max. length: 151 kilometres (94 mi)
- Max. width: 52 kilometres (32 mi)
- References

The Bay of Fundy (French: Baie de Fundy) is a bay between the Canadian provinces of New Brunswick and Nova Scotia, with a small portion touching the U.S. state of Maine. It is an arm of the Gulf of Maine and part of the Atlantic Ocean. It has the highest tidal range in the world, averaging about 16 metres (52 ft) due to tidal resonance in its funnel-shaped basin. In one half-day tidal cycle, around 100 billion tonnes (110 billion short tons) of water flows in and out, twice the combined flow of all the world's rivers.

== Etymology ==
The bay was named Bakudabakek by the indigenous Mi'kmaq and Passamaquoddy groups, meaning "open way". The Wolastoqiyik peoples named it Wekwabegituk, meaning "waves at the head of the bay".

The name "Fundy" has been speculated to have derived from the French word fendu ("split") or Fond de la Baie ("head of the bay"). Some individuals have disputed this, including William Francis Ganong, who suggested that the name likely derived from Portuguese origin instead, specifically regarding João Álvares Fagundes, who may have referred to the bay as Gram Baya ("Great Bay") and nearby waters as Rio Fondo ("deep river").

== Tides ==
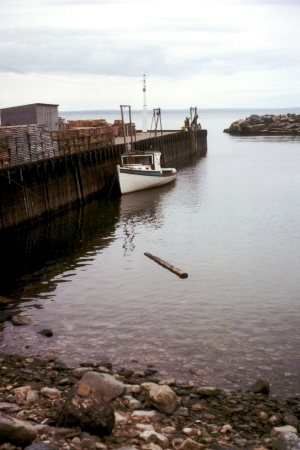
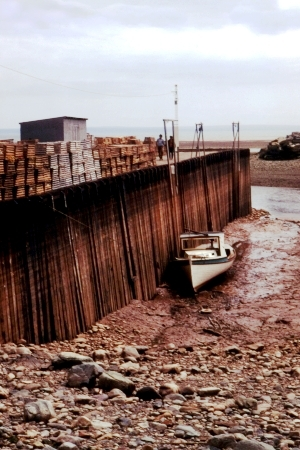
Alma, New Brunswick, at high and low tide

The tidal range in the Bay of Fundy is about 16 metres (52 ft); the average tidal range worldwide is only one metre (3.3 ft). Some tides are higher than others, depending on the position of the moon, the sun, and atmospheric conditions. Tides are semidiurnal, meaning they have two highs and two lows each day, with about 6 hours and 13 minutes between each high and low tide.

Because of tidal resonance in the funnel-shaped bay, the tides that flow through the channel are very powerful. In one half-day tidal cycle, about 100 billion tonnes (110 billion short tons) of water flows in and out of the bay, which is twice as much as the combined total flow of all the rivers of the world over the same period. The Annapolis Royal Generating Station, a 20 MW tidal power station on the Annapolis River upstream of Annapolis Royal, was, until its shutdown in 2019, one of the few tidal generating stations in the world, and the only one in North America.

Most of the rivers that drain into the Bay of Fundy have a tidal bore, a wave front of the incoming tide that "bores" its way up a river against its normal flow. Notable tidal bores include those on the Petitcodiac, Maccan, St. Croix, and Kennetcook rivers. Before the construction of a causeway in 1968 and subsequent siltation of the river, the Petitcodiac River had one of the world's largest tidal bores, up to two metres (6.6 ft) high. Since the opening of the causeway gates in 2010, the bore has been coming back, and in 2013 surfers rode it a record-breaking 29 kilometres (18 mi).

Other tidal phenomena include the Reversing Falls near the mouth of the St. John River, a rip tide at Cape Enrage, and the Old Sow whirlpool at Passamaquoddy Bay.

== Geology ==
The story of the Fundy Basin begins about 220 million years ago in the late Triassic, when all land on earth was part of a supercontinent called Pangaea. At that time what is now the Maritimes was situated near the equator and had a warm tropical climate and lush vegetation. As continental drift reshaped the world between the Late Triassic and Early Jurassic periods, Pangaea broke up. This rifting event created a series of rift basins along eastern North America, including the Fundy Basin.

During the continental breakup, magma erupted as basaltic lavas and left igneous rock formations such as the columnar jointing which can be seen on Brier and Grand Manan islands, among other places around the bay. These flows often are the sites of rarer mineral deposits including agate, amethyst, and stilbite, the latter being the provincial mineral of Nova Scotia.

These rifts filled with sediment which became sedimentary rock. Many fossils have been found along the Fundy shoreline. The oldest dinosaur fossil in Canada was found at Burntcoat Head. Very early reptiles have been discovered in Carboniferous tree trunks at Joggins. Wasson Bluff has a rich trove of Jurassic fossils.

The bay is a member of the Global Geoparks Network, a UNESCO initiative to promote and conserve the planet's geological heritage.

== Flora and fauna ==
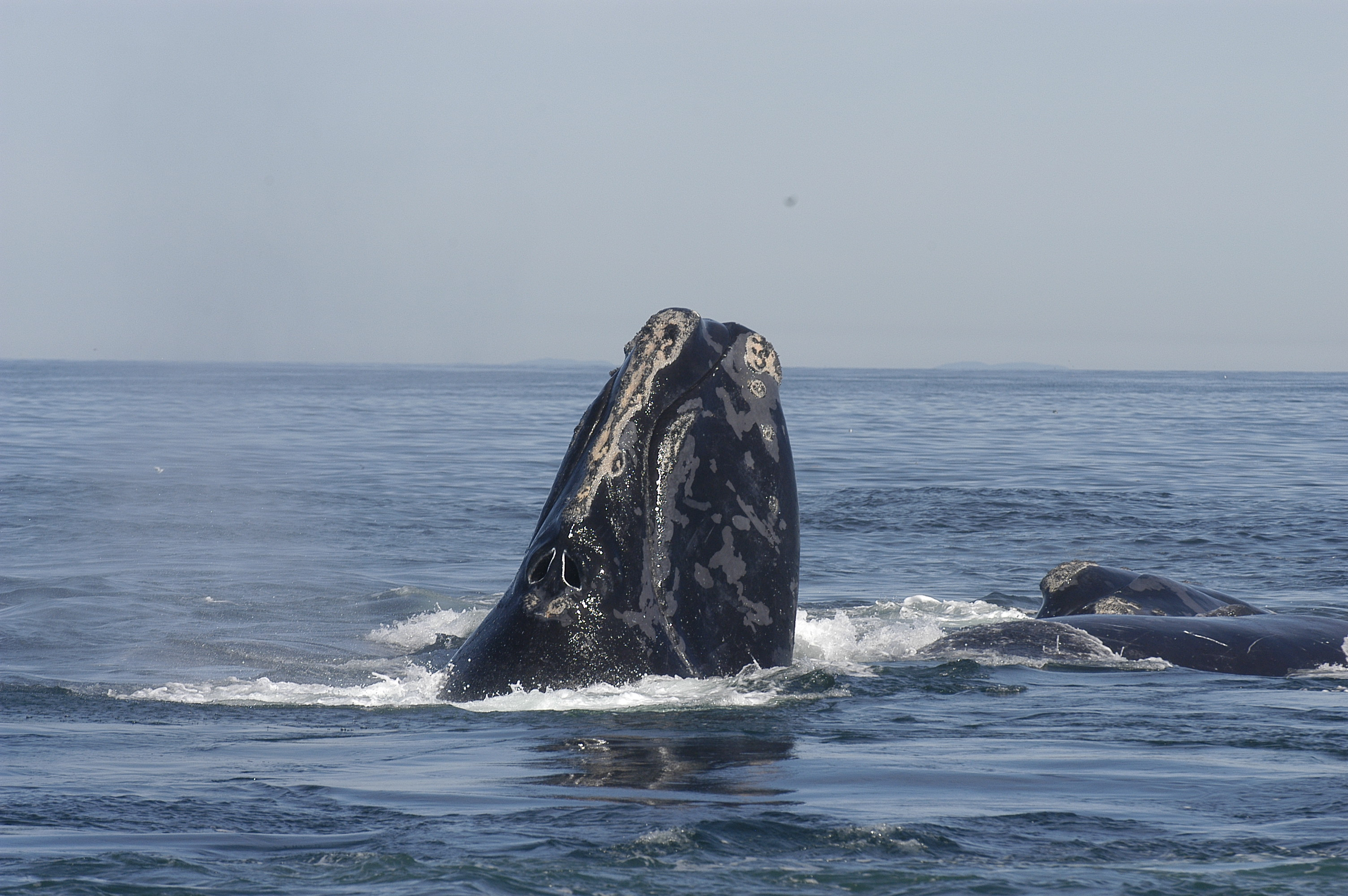
The critically endangered North Atlantic right whale can be found in the Bay of Fundy.

Although some land areas are protected, there is no formal marine protection zone in the bay. The Conservation Council of New Brunswick works to protect the ecosystem of the bay. A result of shipping traffic has been the potential for increased collisions between ships and the critically endangered North Atlantic right whale. In 2003, the Canadian Coast Guard adjusted shipping lanes crossing prime whale feeding areas at the entrance to the Bay of Fundy to lessen the risk of collision. Many other marine mammals are found in the bay including fin whales, humpback whales, minke whales, Atlantic white-sided dolphin and the harbour porpoise.

The Bay of Fundy mudflats are a rare and unique intertidal habitat. Major mudflats are found on around the Maringouin Peninsula which lies between Shepody Bay and the Cumberland Basin and at the northern end of Chignecto Bay. On the Nova Scotia side, mudflats are found on the southern side of the Minas Basin and in Cobequid Bay. In the Minas Basin, the size of the mudflats from low to high water marks is as much as 4 km (2.5 mi). Due to tidal turbulence, the water in these area contains very high amounts of fine sediment, source from tidal erosion of Carboniferous and Triassic sedimentary rock. Primary producers include hollow green weed, phytoplankton, algae, and sea lettuce.

Protected areas include:

- Blomidon Provincial Park and Five Islands Provincial Park, both in Minas Basin.
- Boot Island National Wildlife Area in the Minas Basin near the mouth of the Gaspereau River.
- Cape Chignecto Provincial Park: Nova Scotia's largest provincial park, named for Cape Chignecto, a headland which divides the Bay of Fundy and Chignecto Bay to the north and the Minas Channel leading to the Minas Basin to the east.
- Chignecto National Wildlife Area: near Amherst, contains a wide variety of habitats due to its geology.
- Fundy National Park, which connects to the Fundy Footpath.
- Grindstone Island Conservation Easement: managed by the Nature Trust of New Brunswick through a conservation easement on an island at the entrance of Shepody Bay.
- Hopewell Rocks Provincial Park in New Brunswick
- Isle Haute, managed by the Canadian Wildlife Service.
- John Lusby Marsh National Wildlife Area: a large wetland system near Amherst.
- Musquash Estuary Marine Protected Area: protects the largest ecologically intact estuary in the Bay of Fundy
- New River Beach Provincial Park near Saint John, New Brunswick
- Raven Head Wilderness Area: protects 44 km (27 mi) of undeveloped coast along the bay. It is southwest of Joggins and also a site for fossils. It is also a wildlife habitat for endangered species.
- Roosevelt Campobello International Park: preserves the house and surrounding landscape of the summer retreat of Franklin D. Roosevelt, on Campobello Island in New Brunswick.
- Shepody National Wildlife Area: a habitat for birds and other wildlife, recognized as an important wetland under the Ramsar Convention, a site of importance by the Western Hemisphere Shorebird Reserve Network, and a bird area by BirdLife International. The dominant bird species is the semipalmated sandpiper.
- South Wolf Island Nature Preserve: in the lower bay, about 12 km (7.5 mi) offshore from Blacks Harbour. It was donated to the Nature Trust of New Brunswick by Clover Leaf Seafoods in 2011. It is ecologically important for birds, some not common on the mainland, as well as some very rare plants.
- Tintamarre National Wildlife Area

== Human geography and history ==
=== History ===
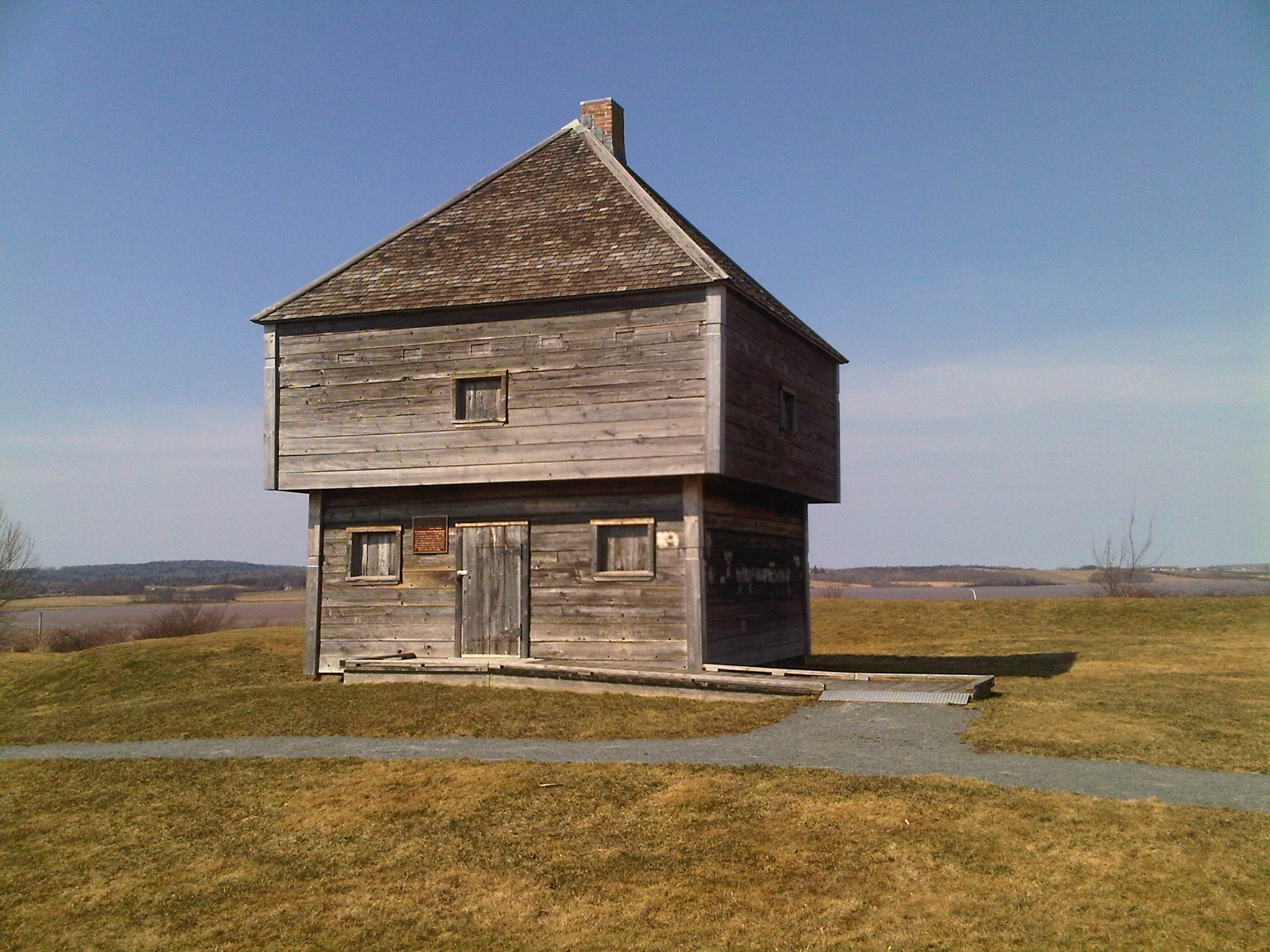
Fort Edward (built 1750), Windsor, Nova Scotia—the oldest blockhouse in North America

The Miꞌkmaq fished in the Bay of Fundy and lived in communities around the bay for centuries before the first Europeans arrived. According to Miꞌkmaq legend, the tide was created when Glooscap wanted to take a bath.

The first European to visit the bay may have been Portuguese explorer João Álvares Fagundes in about 1520, although the bay does not appear on Portuguese maps until 1558. The first European settlement was French, founded at Saint Croix Island in Maine, and then Port Royal, founded by Pierre Dugua and Samuel de Champlain in 1605. Champlain named it Labaye Francoise (The French Bay). Champlain describes finding an old rotted cross in the bay which may have been left by the Portuguese.

The village was the first permanent European settlement north of the Spanish St. Augustine, Florida, and predated by two years the first permanent British settlement in Jamestown, Virginia. About 75 years later, Acadians spread out along the bay, founding Grand-Pré, Beaubassin, Cobequid, and Pisiguit.

There was much military action and many attacks on the settlements around the bay, first as the French and British fought for control of the area, leading to the expulsion of the Acadians, and later by Americans during the American Revolution and the War of 1812.

In the 19th century, the bay was the site of much shipping, and shipbuilders flourished, including James Moran of St. Martins, New Brunswick, Joseph Salter, of Moncton, and William D. Lawrence of Maitland, Nova Scotia. Fundy ports produced the fastest ship in the world, Marco Polo; the largest wooden ship ever built in Canada, William D. Lawrence; and the first female sea captain in the western world, Molly Kool. The mystery ship Mary Celeste was also built there.

The highest water level ever recorded, 21.6 metres (71 feet), occurred in October 1869. It caused extensive destruction to ports and communities, much of which was attributed to a two-metre storm surge created by the Saxby Gale, a tropical cyclone, which coincided with a perigean spring tide. Waves breached dykes protecting low-lying farmland in the Minas Basin and the Tantramar Marshes, sending ocean waters surging far inland.

=== Settlements ===
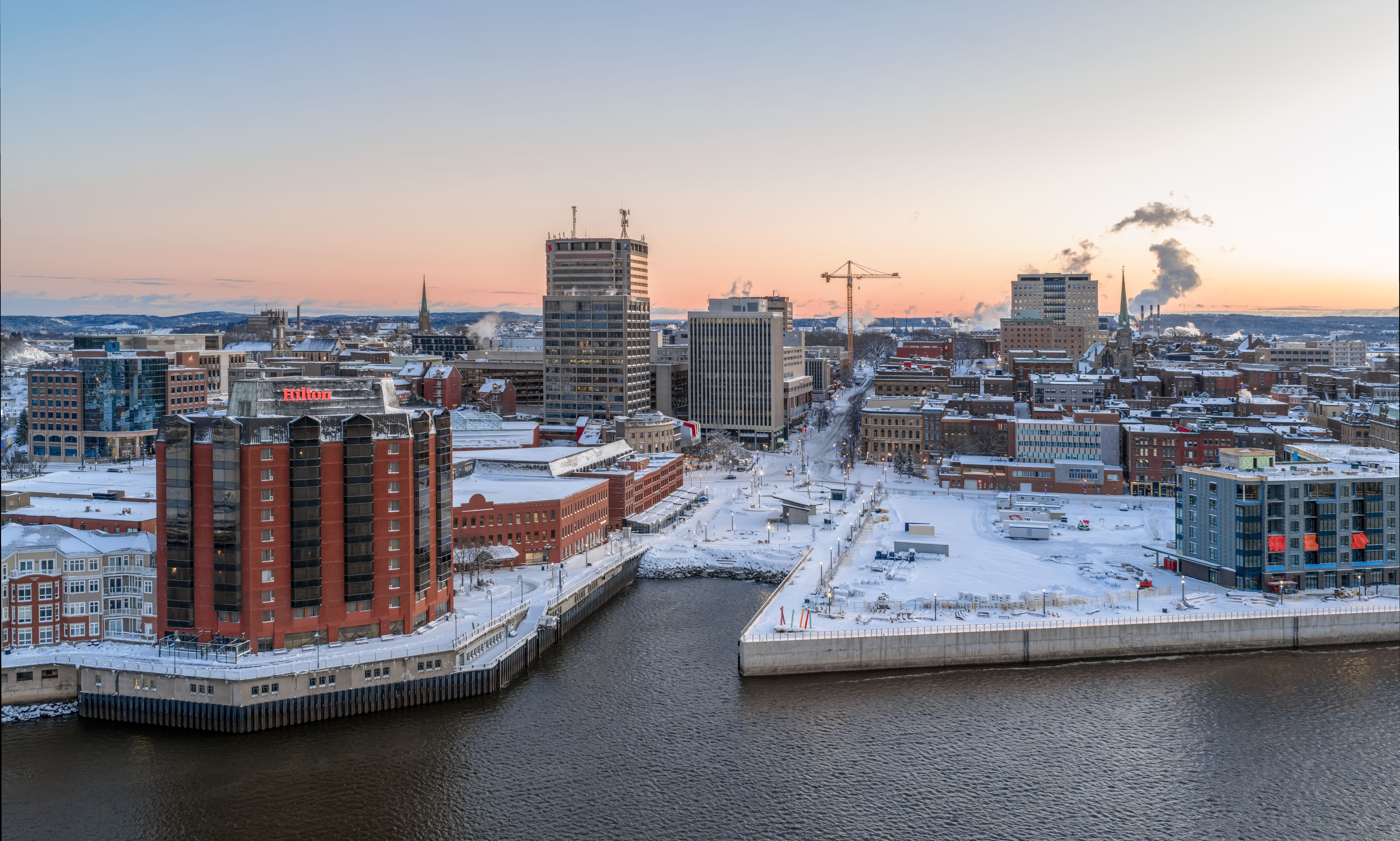
Saint John, NB, is the only major city on the Bay of Fundy.

The largest population centre on the bay is Saint John, New Brunswick, a major port and the first incorporated city in what is now Canada. Other settlements include, in New Brunswick, St. Andrews, Blacks Harbour, Grand Manan, Campobello, Fundy-St. Martins, Alma, Riverside-Albert, Hopewell Cape, and Sackville, and in Nova Scotia, Amherst, Advocate Harbour, Parrsboro, Truro, Maitland, Cheverie, Windsor, Wolfville, Canning, Annapolis Royal, and Digby.

=== Ports and shipping ===
The Port of Saint John is the largest port in Atlantic Canada by volume, giving access to the pulp and paper industry and the Irving Oil Refinery. Hantsport, Nova Scotia, also has a pulp and paper mill and ships gypsum to the United States.

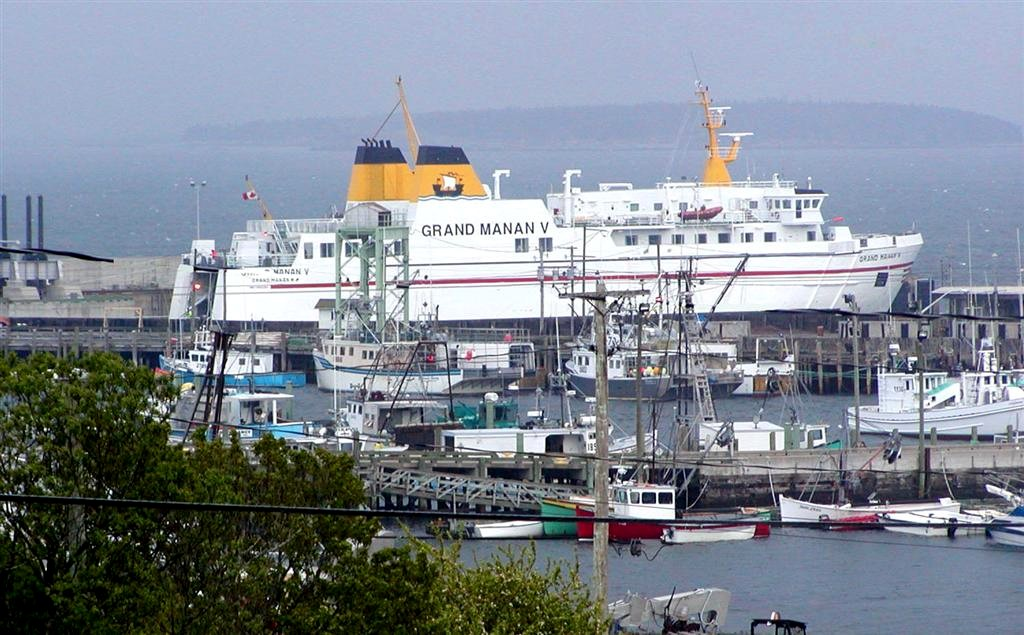
Grand Manan V ferry at North Head, Grand Manan Island

Ferry services provide passenger and vehicle links across the Bay of Fundy. The main interprovincial service operates between Saint John, New Brunswick and Digby, Nova Scotia, aboard the MV Fundy Rose operated by Bay Ferries. Within New Brunswick, Coastal Transport Limited operates provincial ferry services connecting Blacks Harbour and Grand Manan Island, as well as Ingalls Head (Grand Manan) and White Head Island. Another ferry route linking Letete and Deer Island operates as a provincial service by the New Brunswick Department of Transportation and is also operated by Coastal Transport.

Additional ferries include:

- Campobello Island, to Deer Island and Eastport, Maine, to Deer Island. Operated by East Coast Ferries Limited.
- Brier Island to Long Island and Long Island to peninsular Nova Scotia, operated by Nova Scotia Department of Transportation and Public Works.

== See also ==
- Military action in the bay: Raid on St. John (1775), Battle off Cape Split (1781), Raid on Annapolis Royal (1781).
