= Hopewell Cape, New Brunswick =

Village in New Brunswick, Canada

Coordinates: 45°50′51.7″N 64°34′34.8″W

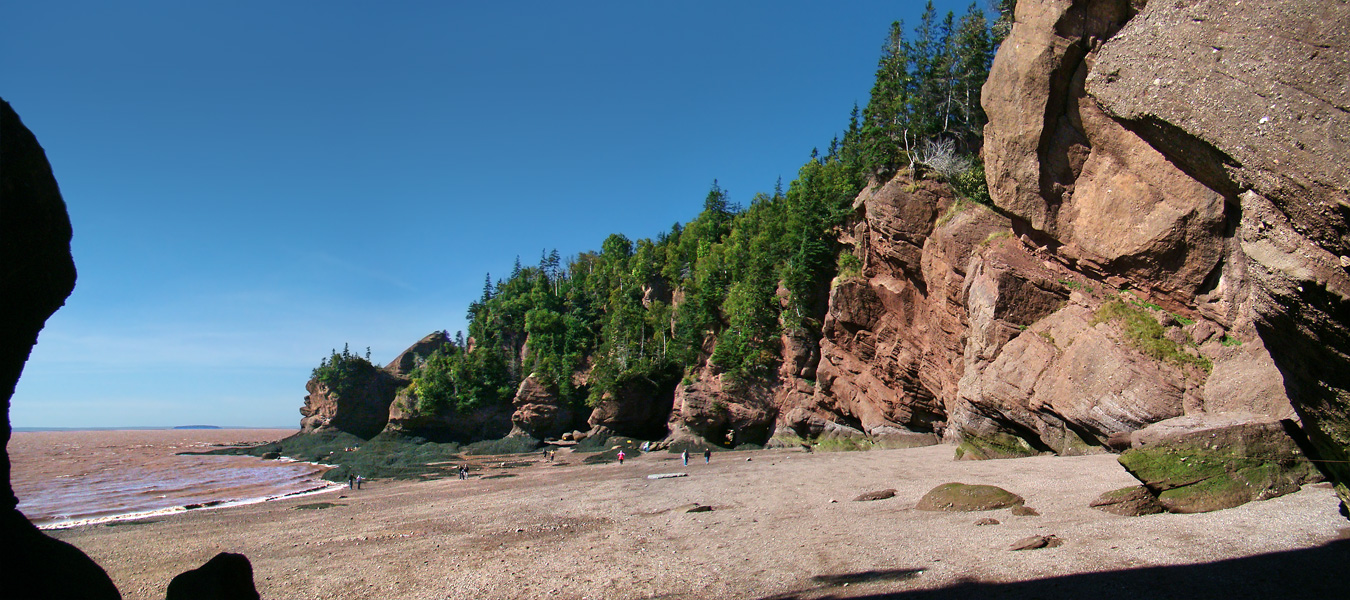
The Hopewell Rocks at low tide

Hopewell Cape is a Canadian village and headland in Albert County, New Brunswick at the northern end of Shepody Bay and the mouth of the Petitcodiac River.

Hopewell Cape had been the municipal centre for Albert County prior to the dissolution of county municipal government in the 1960s. However, it was not incorporated as a Village like many other small villages had at that time. Exact population figures are not maintained; however, it is among the largest communities in Hopewell Parish, which had a population in 2016 of 647. Its population density of 4.3/Km2 makes the parish equivalent to the Village of Alma.

Hopewell Cape is the site of the Hopewell Rocks, part of the world-famous Hopewell Cape Formation accessible at low tide on Shepody Bay. Hopewell Cape is also the site of the Albert County Museum that features an original jail and courthouse. There are plans for displays at the museum that will highlight the life and career of the Hon. Richard B. Bennett, former Prime Minister of Canada, who was born in nearby Hopewell Hill. Historically, the economy of Hopewell Cape was mainly based on lumbering; today it is largely based on tourism.

On the morning of Mar 14, 2016, Elephant Rock, one of the most photographed of the cliff formations on the shores of the Bay of Fundy, sheared almost in half.

== See also ==
- List of communities in New Brunswick
