= Hopewell Rocks =

Provincial park of New Brunswick, Canada

Coordinates: 45°49.4′N 64°34.4′W

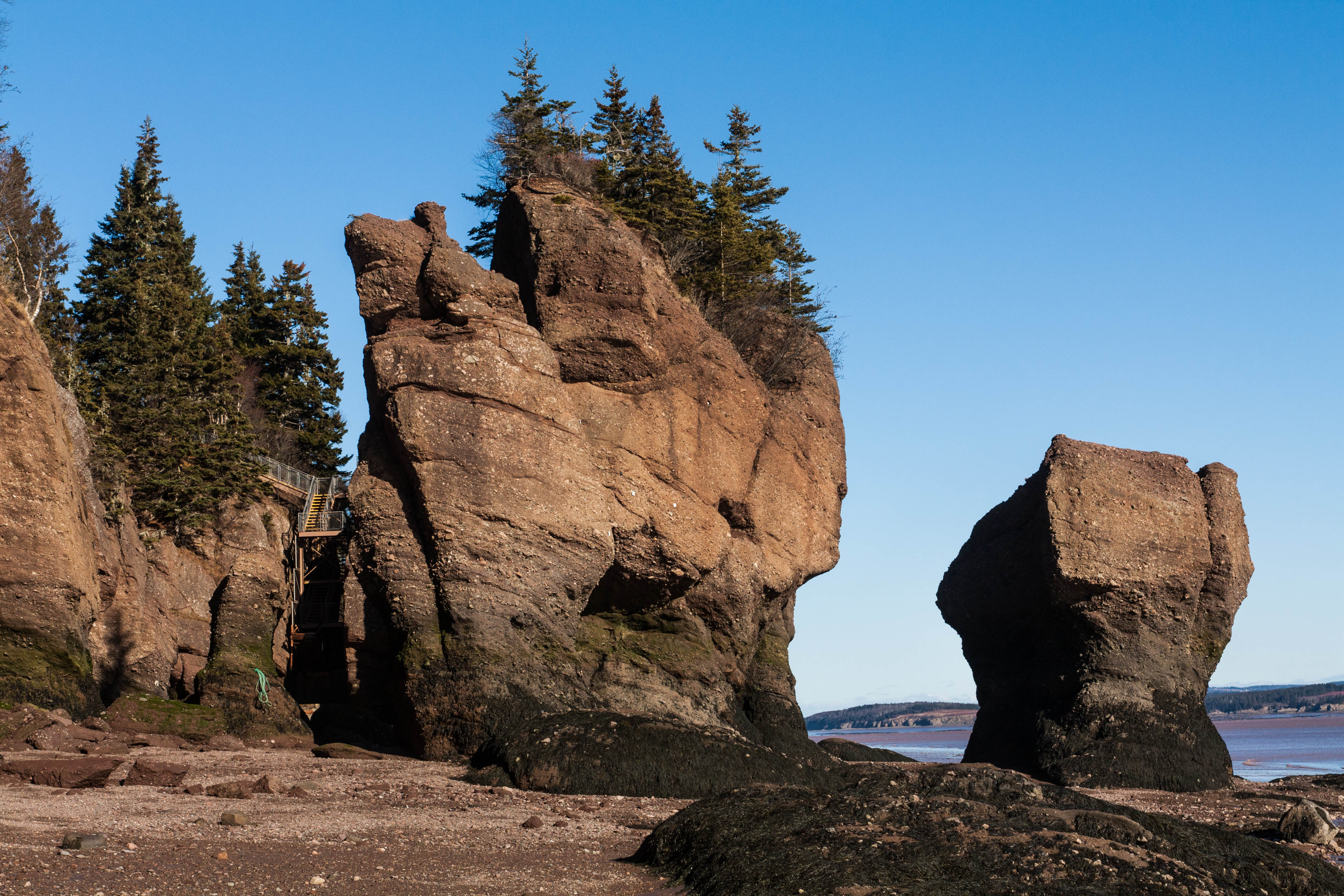
Tilted layers of sandstone at Hopewell Rocks in the Bay of Fundy

The Hopewell Rocks, also called the Flowerpot Rocks or simply the Rocks, are rock formations known as sea stacks caused by tidal erosion in the Hopewell Rocks Ocean Tidal Exploration Site at the Hopewell Rocks Provincial Park in New Brunswick, Canada. They stand 12–21 metres (40–70 ft) tall.

They are located on the shores of the upper reaches of the Bay of Fundy at Hopewell Cape near the end of a series of Fundy coastal tourism hubs including Fundy National Park and the Fundy Trail. Due to the extreme tidal range of the Bay of Fundy, the base of the formations are covered in water twice a day. It is possible to view the formations from ground level at low tide.

The formations consist of red-brown sedimentary conglomerate, sandstone, and minor mudstone rock from the Carboniferous Hopewell Cape Formation, part of the Mabou Group. The large volume of water flowing in to and out of the Bay of Fundy modifies the landscape surrounding it. After the retreat of the glaciers in the region following the last ice age, surface water filtering through cracks in the cliff has eroded and separated the formations from the rest of the cliff face. Meanwhile, advancing and retreating tides and the associated waves have eroded the base of the rocks at a faster rate than the tops, resulting in their unusual shapes.

The vast sediment planes in the basin in Fundy supports a variety of biological productivity. Various shorebirds are often seen flocking to nest and feed in the area. Visitors are advised to stay for a full tidal cycle to get a full appreciation of the tides and formations. Although the tides vary from day to day, the high tide can be as high as 16 metres (52 ft) giving the Hopewell Rocks one of the highest average tides in the world.

On March 14, 2016, a part of one of the Hopewell Rocks, Elephant Rock, collapsed. Park officials said approximately 100 to 200 tonnes of rock fell to the ground. "Sometime after the tide went out this morning, a significant piece of Elephant Rock calved off, closing off a whole section or a whole passageway where we used to walk," said Kevin Snair, supervisor of interpretive services at the Hopewell Rocks. A similar formation collapsed at the nearby Fundy Trail Parkway on February 24, 2022.

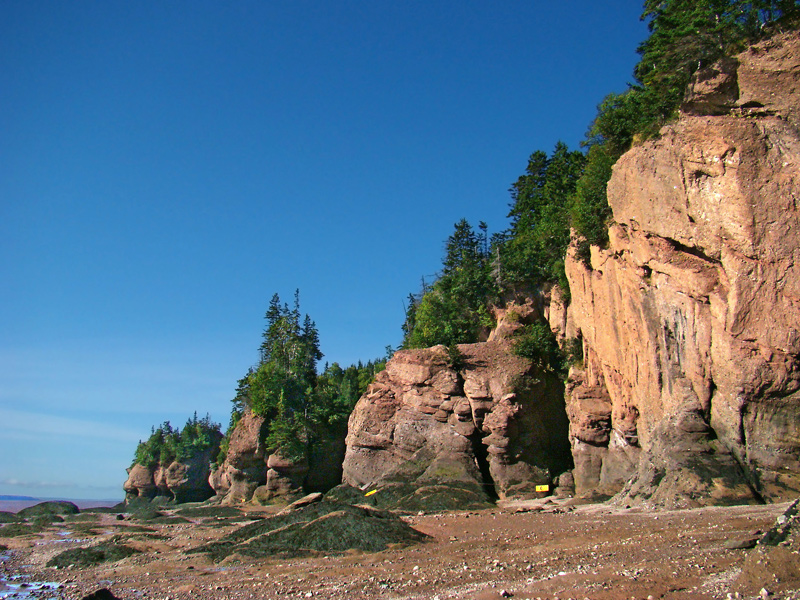
The Flowerpot Rocks at low tide

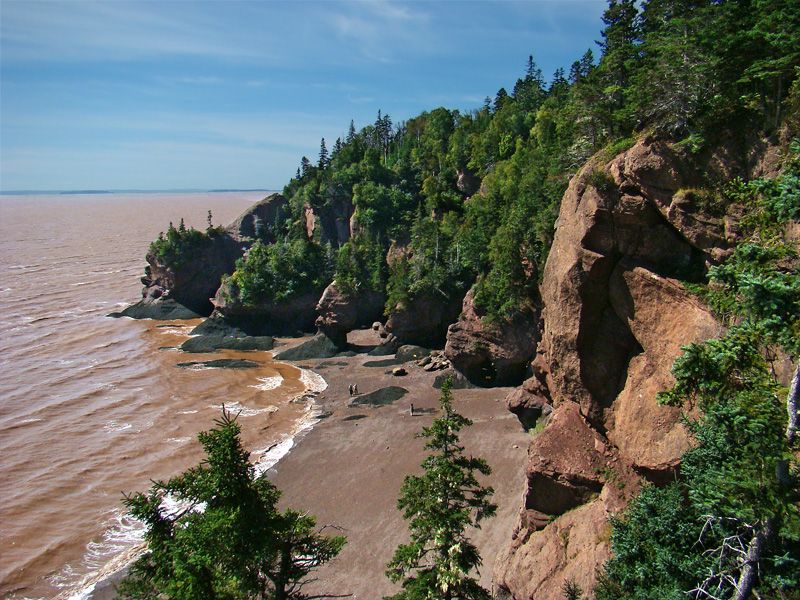
Hopewell Rocks at low tide

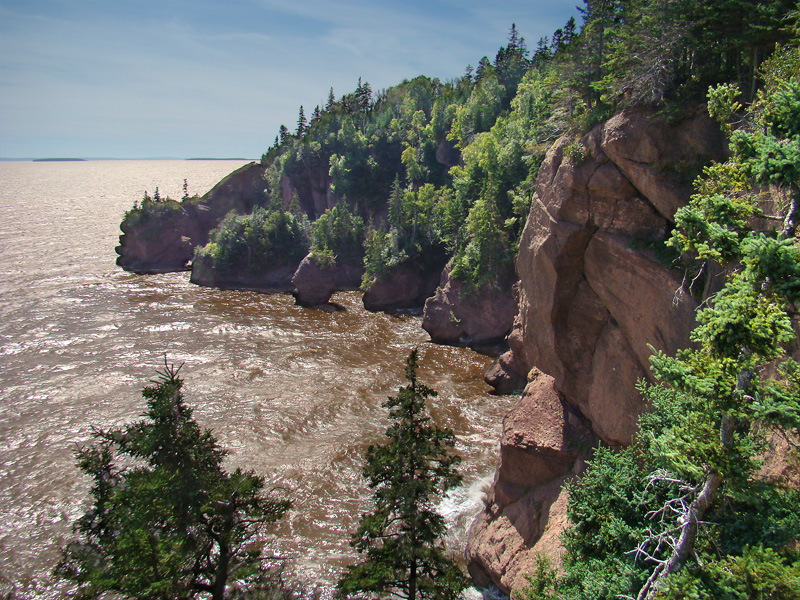
Hopewell Rocks at high tide

== See also ==
- Burntcoat Head, Nova Scotia, site of the highest recorded tides in the world
