= Fundy-St. Martins =

- Village
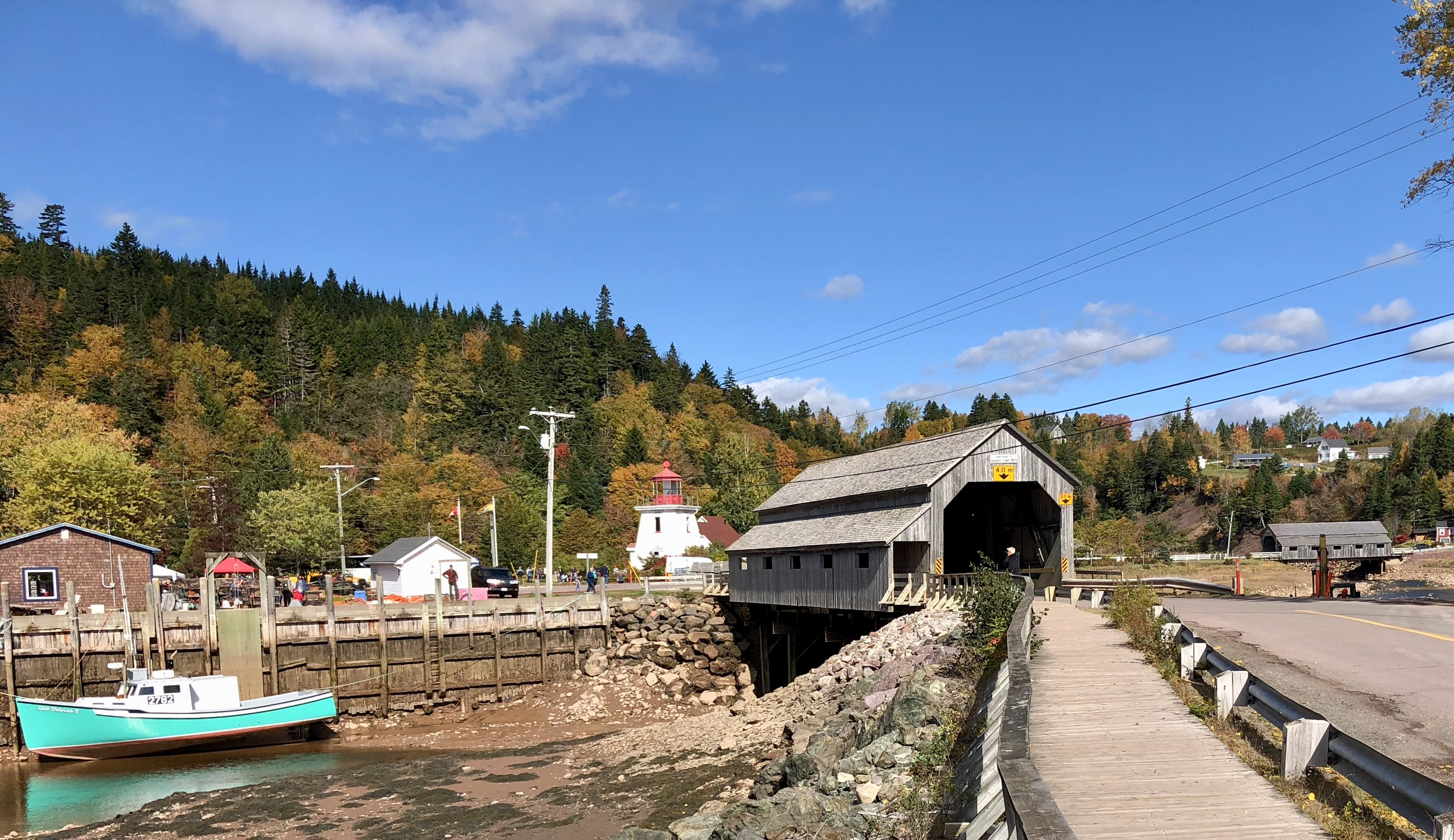
- Fundy-St. Martins and its twin covered bridges
- Interactive map of Fundy-St. Martins
- Location within New Brunswick Fundy-St. Martins (Canada)
- Coordinates: 45°21′1.6″N 65°32′2.3″W
- Country: Canada
- Province: New Brunswick
- County: Saint John County
- Regional service commission: Fundy
- Incorporated: January 1, 2023

Government
  - Type: Village council
  - Mayor: John Douglas Cairns
- Time zone: UTC-4 (AST)
  - Summer (DST): UTC-3 (ADT)

Fundy-St. Martins is a village in the Canadian province of New Brunswick. The jurisdiction was formed through the 2023 New Brunswick local governance reforms which saw the consolidation of entities into regions or districts.

== History ==
Fundy-St. Martins was incorporated on January 1, 2023 by amalgamating the village of St. Martins and certain previously unincorporated areas including Fairfield and parts of Simonds Parish (Saint John County) and Saint Martins Parish.

== Attractions ==
Attractions in Fundy-St. Martins include the St. Martins Sea Caves, the beach and tidal harbour, the start of the Fundy Trail, two covered bridges and the Quaco Head Lighthouse, the Quaco Museum and Library, and the Fundy Trail Parkway.

== Gallery ==
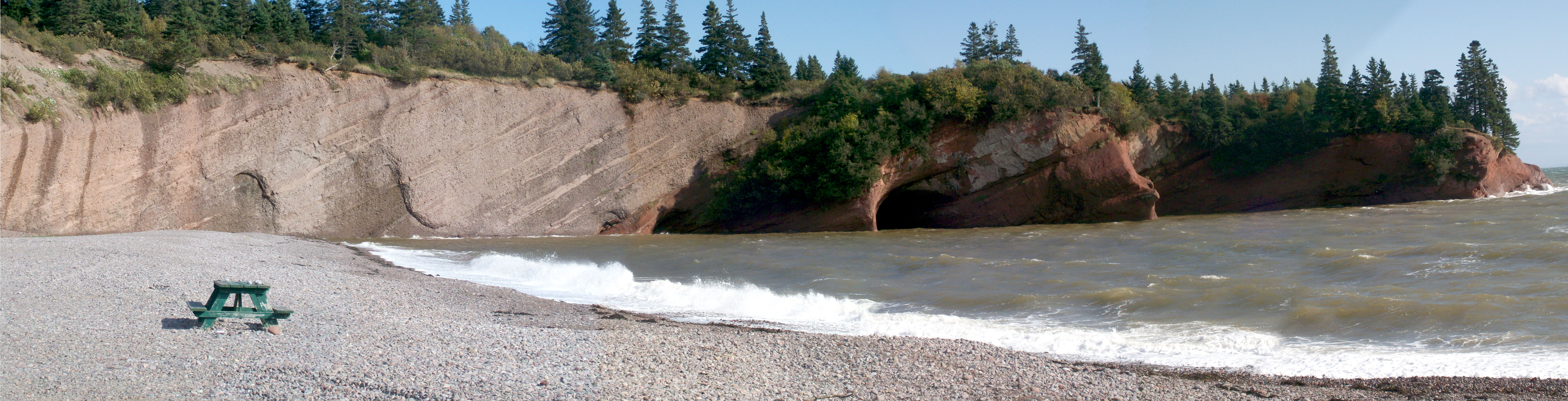
St. Martins' Caves

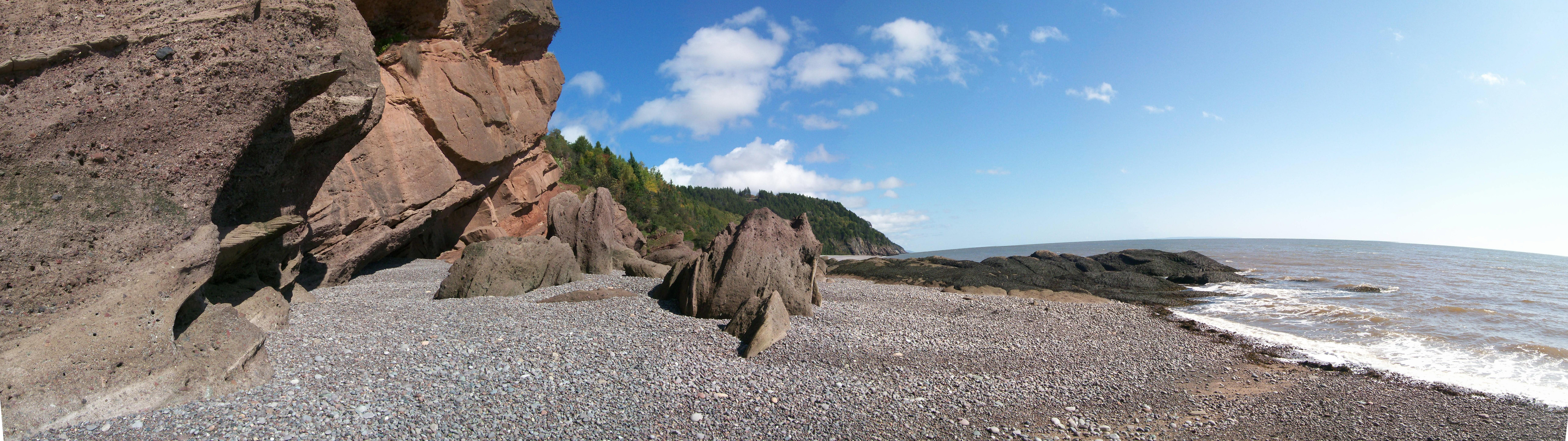
Fundy Trail

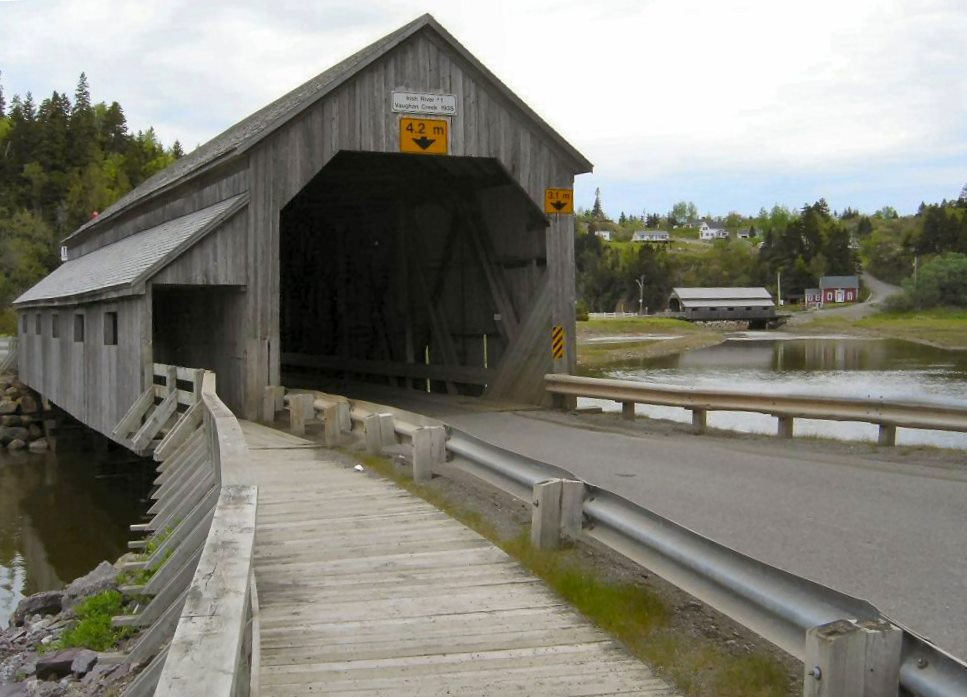
Twin covered bridges

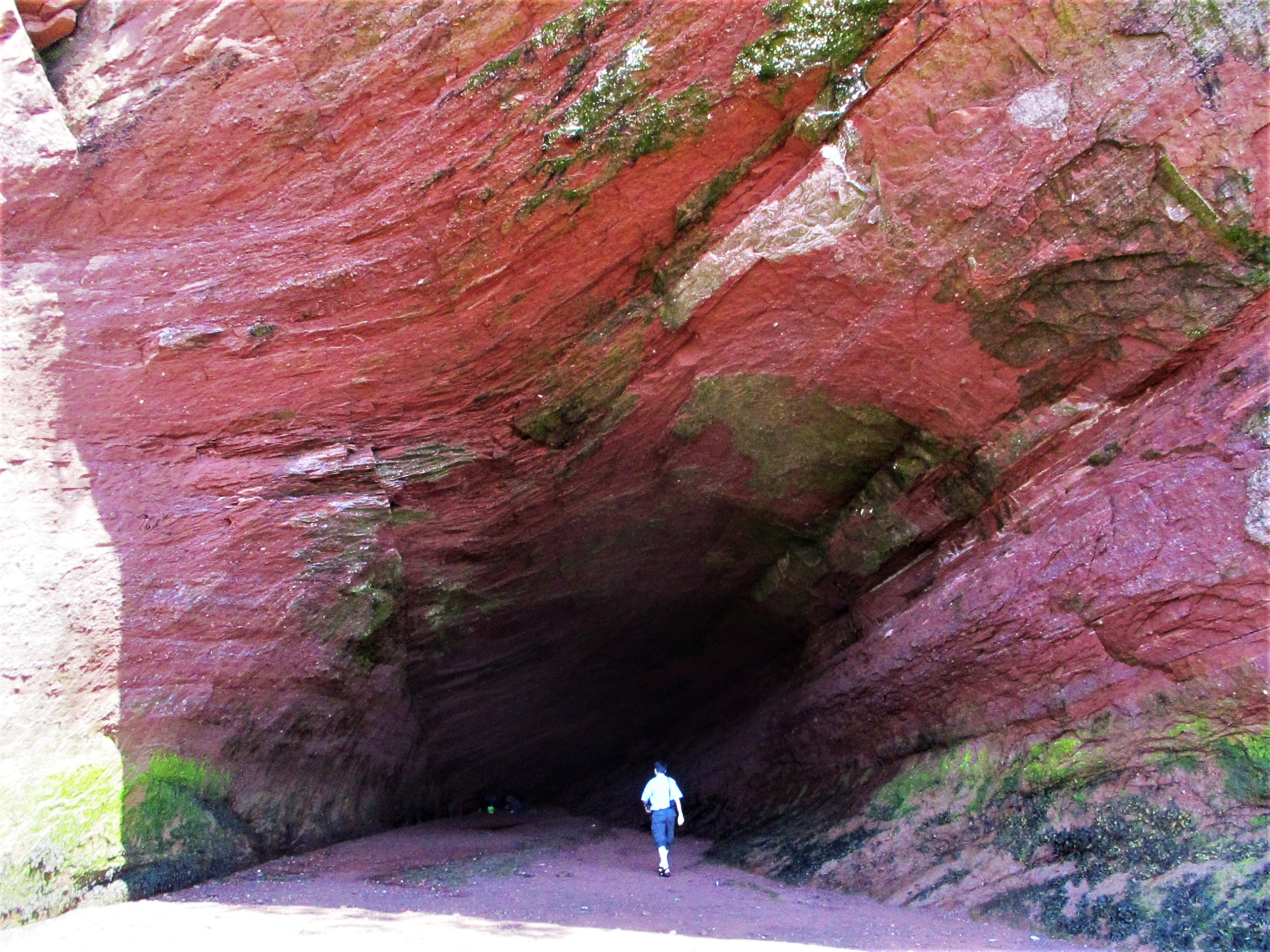
St Martins Sea Cave

== See also ==
- List of communities in New Brunswick
- List of municipalities in New Brunswick
