= Fundy Footpath =

Hiking trail in New Brunswick, Canada

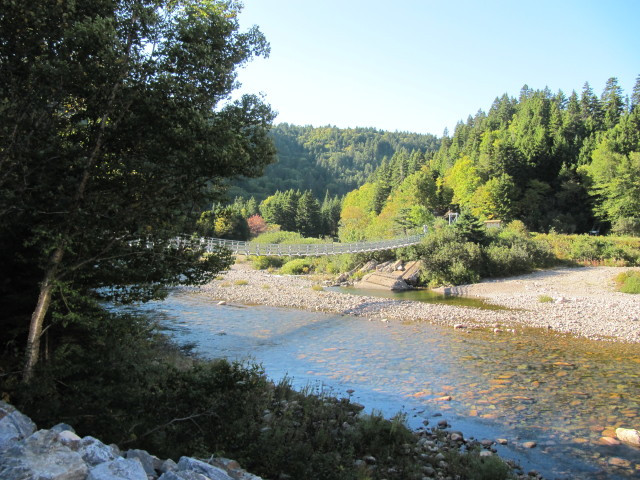
- Suspension bridge at Big Salmon River
- Length: 41 kilometres (25 mi)
- Location: New Brunswick, Canada
- Trailheads: Big Salmon River, Fundy National Park
- Season: Spring/Summer/Fall
- Website: http://fundyhikingtrails.com

The Fundy Footpath is a 41 kilometres (25 mi) hiking trail that starts at the Fundy Trail Parkway from Big Salmon River (in Saint Martins Parish) to Fundy National Park in New Brunswick, Canada. The trail connects to the 33 kilometres (21 mi) Fundy Trail at Fundy National Park, which in turn connects to the Dobson Trail. The trail's earliest route was blazed by Jack McKay in the early 1980s but it fell into disuse. It was reestablished by Alonzo and Gilles Leger along with many other volunteers throughout the late 1980 and early 1990s. The trail was officially opened in 1994 under the management of the Fundy Hiking Trail Association Inc. In 2012 more than 500 people hiked the trail, which offers a challenging hiking experience lasting 4 days.
