= Coverdale Parish =

Coverdale
- Parish
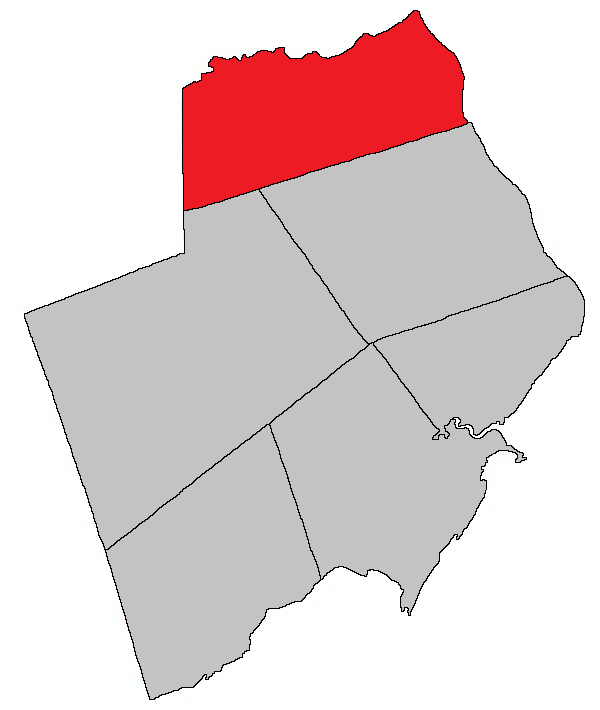
- Location within Albert County.
- Coordinates: 46.03°N 64.86°W
- Country: Canada
- Province: New Brunswick
- County: Albert County
- Erected: 1828

Area
  - Land: 236.00 km^{2} (91.12 sq mi)

Population (2021)
  - Total: 4,766
  - Density: 20.2/km^{2} (52/sq mi)
  - Change 2016-2021: ▲6.7%
  - Dwellings: 1,919
- Time zone: UTC-4 (AST)
  - Summer (DST): UTC-3 (ADT)
- Figures do not include portion within the town of Riverview

Coverdale is a geographic parish in Albert County, New Brunswick, Canada, (Note: The Territorial Division Act divides the province into 152 parishes, the cities of Saint John and Fredericton, and one town of Grand Falls. The Interpretation Act clarifies that parishes include any local government within their borders.) located along the Petitcodiac River opposite Moncton and Dieppe.

For governance purposes, Coverdale is divided between the towns of Riverview and Salisbury, the village of Fundy Albert, and the Southeast rural district, all of which are members of the Southeast Regional Service Commission.

Prior to the 2023 governance reform, the parish was divided between Riverview and the local service district of the parish of Coverdale. Riverview had much the same boundaries.

== Origin of name ==
The parish takes its name from Coverdale River, a former name of Little River, a tributary of the Petitcodiac.

The Coverdale River may have been named in honour of Myles Coverdale (1488-1569), translator of the Bible and Bishop of Exeter.

== History ==
Coverdale Parish was erected in 1828 from northern Hillsborough Parish.

== Boundaries ==
Coverdale Parish is bounded:

- on the north and east by the Petitcodiac River;
- on the south the southern line of a grant to Robert Crossman, about 120 metres south of the mouth of Stoney Creek, and its prolongation to the Westmorland County line;
- on the west by Westmorland County.

=== Evolution of boundaries ===
When Coverdale Parish was erected the western line was a continuation of Hillsborough's western line, with modern Grub Road and Middlesex in Salisbury Parish and the parish line running east of Douthwright Road. The southern line ran west from the mouth of Stoney Creek, slightly north of where it starts today.

Following the erection of Albert County in 1845 the new county line passed through Salisbury and Harvey Parishes. This was found inconvenient and the county line was moved in 1846, adding western Coverdale to the parish.

The parish got its modern boundaries in 1850, when the line with Hillsborough Parish was moved slightly south to its current starting point.

== Municipality ==
The town of Riverview is located opposite Moncton. It was created in 1973 as the town of Coverdale by the forced amalgamation of the villages of (from east to west) Bridgedale, Gunningsville, and Riverview Heights along with parts of Coverdale Parish. The first act of the town council was to change the name to Riverview.

== Local service district ==
The local service district of the parish of Coverdale contained all of the parish outside Riverview; it was established on 23 November 1966 to assess for fire protection and community services & recreational facilities following the abolition of the county councils by the new Municipalities Act. First aid & ambulance services were added on 14 March 1973.

In 2020, the LSD assesses for community & recreation services in addition to the basic LSD services of fire protection, police services, land use planning, emergency measures, and dog control. The taxing authority was 618.00 Coverdale.

== Communities ==
Communities at least partly within the parish; bold indicates an incorporated municipality

- Cherryvale
- Colpitts Settlement
- Coverdale
- Grub Road
- Lower Coverdale
- Lower Turtle Creek
- Middlesex
- Nixon
- Pine Glen
- Price
- Stoney Creek
- Synton
- Turtle Creek
- Upper Coverdale
- **Riverview**
  - Bridgedale
  - Findlay
  - Gunningsville
  - Middle Coverdale
  - Riverview Heights

== Bodies of water ==
Bodies of water (Note: Not including brooks, ponds, or coves.) at least partly in the parish: italics indicate a name no longer in official use

- Bull Creek
- Little River (Coverdale River)
- Mill Creek
- Mud Creek
- Petitcodiac River
- Turtle Creek

== Other notable places ==
Parks, historic sites, and other noteworthy places in the parish.

- Big Meadows Protected Natural Area

== Demographics ==
Parish population total does not include area within 2021 boundaries of Riverview. Revised census figures based on the 2023 local governance reforms have not been released.

=== Population ===
Historical population
Year	Pop.	±%
1991	3,684	—
1996	3,979	+8.0%
2001	4,070	+2.3%
2006	4,144	+1.8%
2011	4,401	+6.2%
2016	4,466	+1.5%

=== Language ===
Mother tongue (2016)

Language	Population	Pct (%)
English only	4,125	92.4%
French only	250	5.6%
Both English and French	35	0.8%
Other languages	55	1.2%

== Access Routes ==
Highways and numbered routes that run through the parish, including external routes that start or finish at the parish limits:

- **Highways**
  - Route 112
  - Route 114
- **Principal Routes**
  - None
- Secondary Routes:
  - Route 895
  - Route 910
- External Routes:
  - None

== See also ==
- List of parishes in New Brunswick
