= Harvey Parish =

Harvey
- Parish
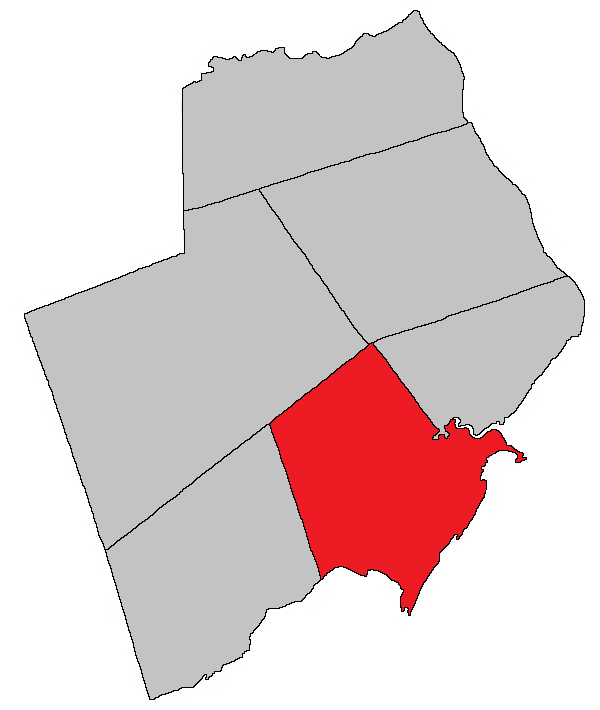
- Location within Albert County.
- Coordinates: 45.72°N 64.78°W
- Country: Canada
- Province: New Brunswick
- County: Albert
- Erected: 1838

Area
  - Land: 276.85 km^{2} (106.89 sq mi)

Population (2021)
  - Total: 358
  - Density: 1.3/km^{2} (3.4/sq mi)
  - Change 2016-2021: ▲7.5%
  - Dwellings: 239
- Time zone: UTC-4 (AST)
  - Summer (DST): UTC-3 (ADT)

Harvey is a geographic parish in southern Albert County, New Brunswick, Canada. (Note: The Territorial Division Act divides the province into 152 parishes, the cities of Saint John and Fredericton, and one town of Grand Falls. The Interpretation Act clarifies that parishes include any local government within their borders.)

For governance purposes, Harvey is divided between the village of Fundy Albert and the Southeast rural district, both members of the Southeast Regional Service Commission.

Prior to the 2023 governance reform, the parish formed a single local service district, the LSD of the parish of Harvey.

== Origin of name ==
The parish was probably named in honour of Sir John Harvey, Lieutenant Governor of New Brunswick 1837-1841.

== History ==
Harvey Parish was erected in 1838 from western Hopewell and southern Salisbury Parishes. It included modern Alma Parish and the southern part of Elgin Parish.

== Boundaries ==
Harvey Parish is bounded:

- on the northwest by a line beginning about 2.8 kilometres west and slightly south of the junction of Rice Road with Kent Road, then running north 72º east (Note: By the magnet of 1847, when declination in the area was between 19º and 20º west of north. The Territorial Division Act clause referring to magnetic direction bearings was later changed to the problematic wording "by the magnet of the year in which the County or Parish was erected", which ignores lines changed after the erection of the county or parish, before being omitted in the 1952 and 1973 Revised Statutes.) to a point about 1.35 kilometres north of Lumsden Road, where Elgin, Harvey, Hillsborough and Hopewell Parishes meet;
- on the east by a line running south 22º east (Note: By the magnet of 1838, when declination in the area was between 18º and 19º west of north.) to Crooked Creek, then down the creek and Shepody River to Shepody Bay;
- on the south by Shepody Bay, Haw Haw Bay, Chignecto Bay, and Rocher Bay;
- on the west by a line beginning on Rocher Bay about 1.1 kilometres southwest of the mouth of Alcorn Brook, then running northerly along the western line of a grant to James Speer and its prolongation to the starting point;
- including Grindstone Island.

=== Evolution of boundaries ===
Harvey's northern line was originally an extension of the northern line of Hopewell Parish, running north of Church Hill Road. This put Church Hill, Churches Corner, Ferndale, River View, and Ross Corner in Harvey.

Following the erection of Albert County in 1845 the new county line passed through Salisbury and Harvey Parishes. This was found inconvenient and the county line was moved in 1846, adding the remainder of modern Elgin Parish to Harvey.

The northern part of Harvey was erected as Elgin Parish in 1847 and the western part as Alma Parish in 1855, giving the parish its modern boundaries.

In 1877 Grindstone Island was omitted from the boundary description of Harvey; this was corrected in 1879.

== Local service district ==
The local service district of the parish of Harvey included the entire parish. The LSD was established on 23 November 1966 to assess for fire protection following the abolition of county councils in the new Municipalities Act. First aid & ambulance services were added on 21 January 1976.

In 2020, it assessed for community & recreation services in addition to the basic LSD services of fire protection, police services, land use planning, emergency measures, and dog control. The taxing authority was 617.00 Harvey.

== Communities ==
Communities at least partly within the parish. italics indicate a name no longer in official use

- Beaver Brook
- Brookville
- Cape Enrage
- Casey Hill
- Derrys Corner
- Germantown
- Harvey
- Harvey Bank
- Little Ridge
- Midway
- New Horton
- New Ireland
- Upper New Horton
- Waterside
- West River

== Bodies of water ==
Bodies of water (Note: Not including brooks, ponds or coves.) at least partly in the parish.

- North River
- Petitcodiac River
- Shepody River
- West River
- Canada Creek
- Crooked Creek
  - Northwest Branch Crooked Creek
- Fairy Creek
- Newfoundland Creek
- New Horton Creek
- Two Rivers Creek
- Chignecto Bay
- Haw Haw Bay
- Rocher Bay
- Salisbury Bay
- Shepody Bay
- Lockhart Lake
- McFadden Lake
- New Horton Lake

== Islands ==
Islands at least partly within the parish.

- Grindstone Island
- Toms Island

== Other notable places ==
Parks, historic sites, and other noteworthy places in the parish.

- Caledonia Gorge Protected Natural Area
- Cape Enrage Provincial Park
- Shepody National Wildlife Area

== Demographics ==
=== Population ===
Historical population
Year	Pop.	±%
1991	473	—
1996	482	+1.9%
2001	429	−11.0%
2006	424	−1.2%
2011	376	−11.3%
2016	333	−11.4%

=== Language ===
Mother tongue (2016)

Language	Population	Pct (%)
English only	310	93.9%
French only	15	4.5%
Both English and French	0	0%
Other languages	5	1.5%

== Access Routes ==
Highways and numbered routes that run through the parish, including external routes that start or finish at the parish limits:

- Highways
  - Route 114
- Principal Routes
  - None
- Secondary Routes:
  - Route 915
- External Routes:
  - None

== See also ==
- List of parishes in New Brunswick
