= Fundy Albert =

- Village
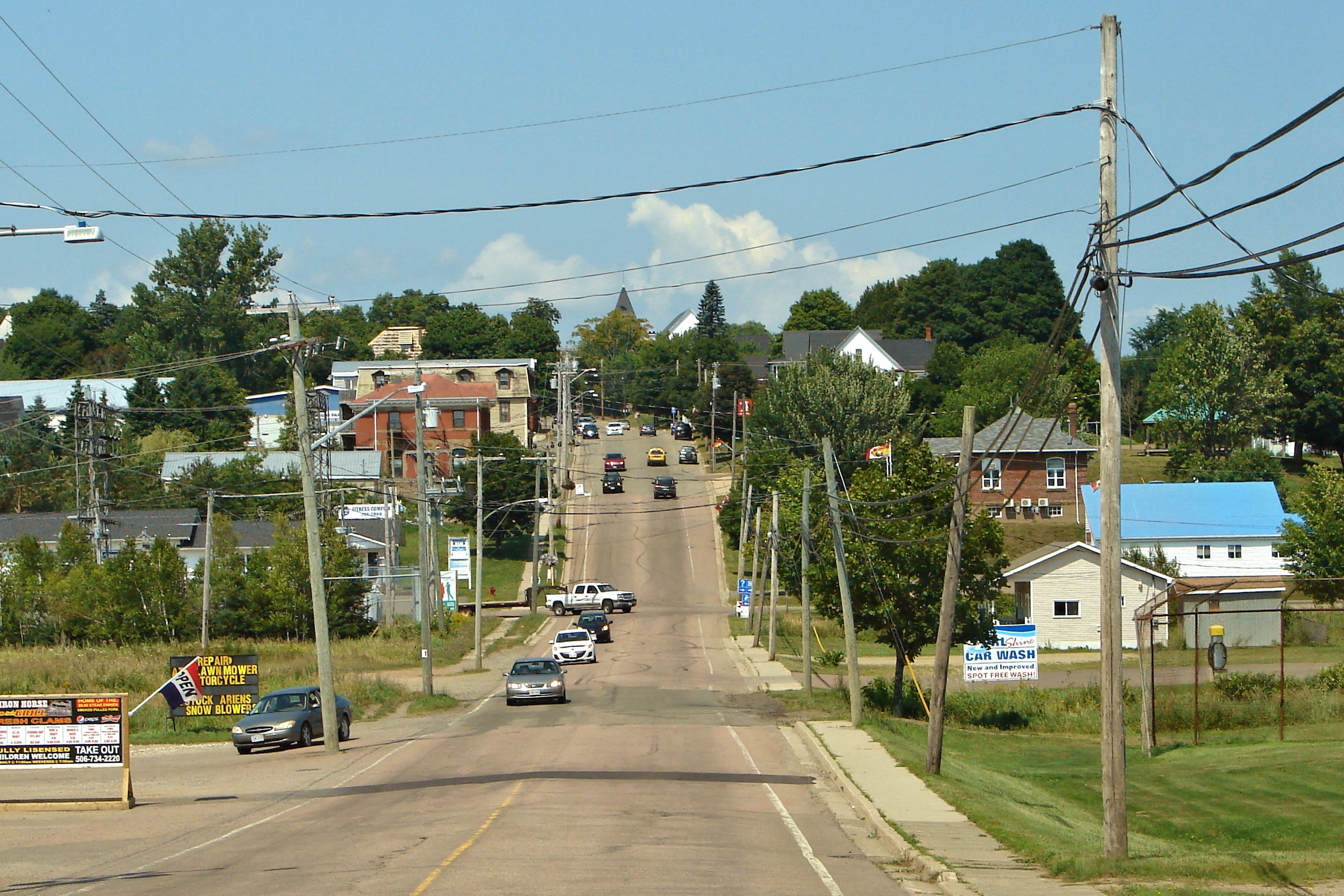
- Hillsborough, NB Main Street (Route 114) looking north

- Location of Hillsborough within New Brunswick
- Country: Canada
- Province: New Brunswick
- County: Albert
- Regional service commission: Southeast
- Incorporated: January 1, 2023

Government
  - Type: district municipal council
  - Mayor: Jim Campbell

Electoral districts
  - Federal: Fundy Royal
  - Provincial: Albert
- Time zone: UTC-4 (AST)
  - Summer (DST): UTC-3 (ADT)
- Postal code(s): E4H
- Area codes: 428, 506
- Highway: Route 114; Route 910; Route 915

Fundy Albert is a village in the Canadian province of New Brunswick. The jurisdiction was formed through the 2023 New Brunswick local governance reforms which saw the consolidation of local government entities into regions or districts.

== History ==
Fundy Albert was established on January 1, 2023 by New Brunswick regulation 2022-50, the Local Governments Establishment Regulation of the Local Governance act, through the amalgamation of the villages of Alma, Riverside-Albert and Hillsborough while at the same time annexing certain mostly adjacent unincorporated areas.

== Places of note ==
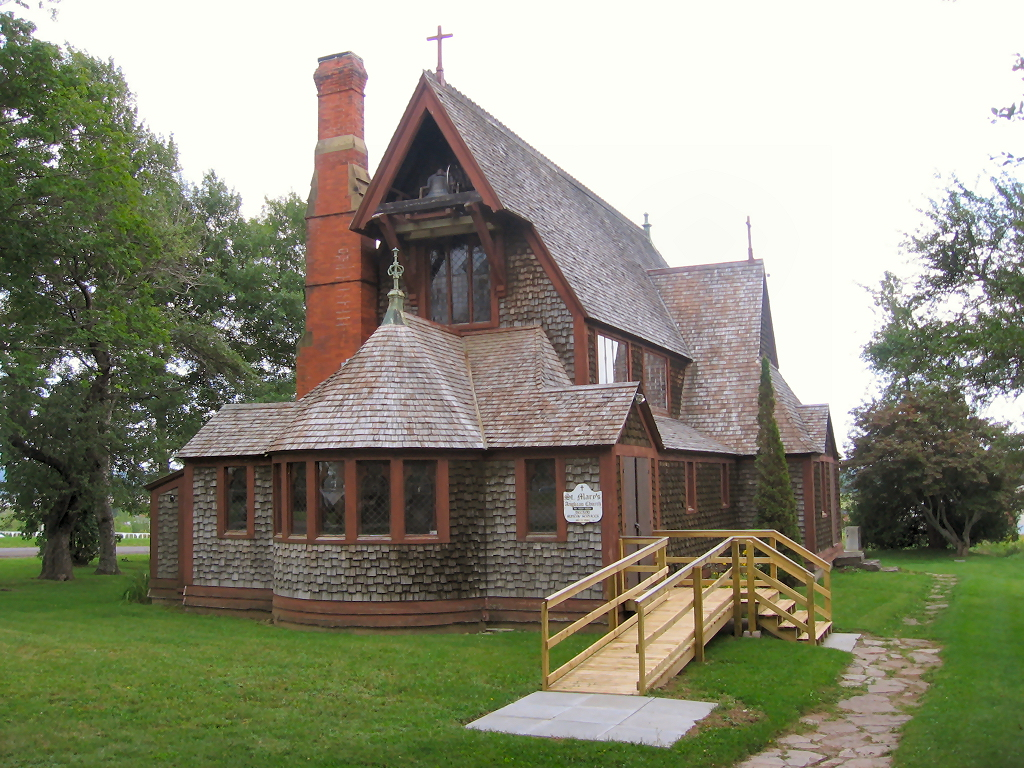
View of St. Mary's Anglican Church in Fundy Albert, New Brunswick. Note the bell under the peak in the roof.

- Fundy Albert is home to the Albert County Chamber of Commerce and the historic New Brunswick Railway Museum and the Hon. William Henry Steeves House Museum.
- Grays Island is a cemetery.
- Surrey was amalgamated into Fundy Albert.
- A monument on the Fundy Albert main street marks the Battle of Peticodiac.

== Education ==
- Caledonia Regional High School
- Hillsborough Elementary School
- Riverside Consolidated

== Notable people ==
- William Steeves, one of the Fathers of Confederation
- Hugh McMonagle, politician
- William James Lewis, politician
- Neil McNeil, former Catholic archbishop of Toronto, was a native of Hillsborough.
- Burpee L. Steeves Lieutenant Governor of Idaho
- Abner Reid McClelan, politician
- Roscoe Fillmore, horticulturalist and activist
- Molly Kool, Master Mariner

== Images ==
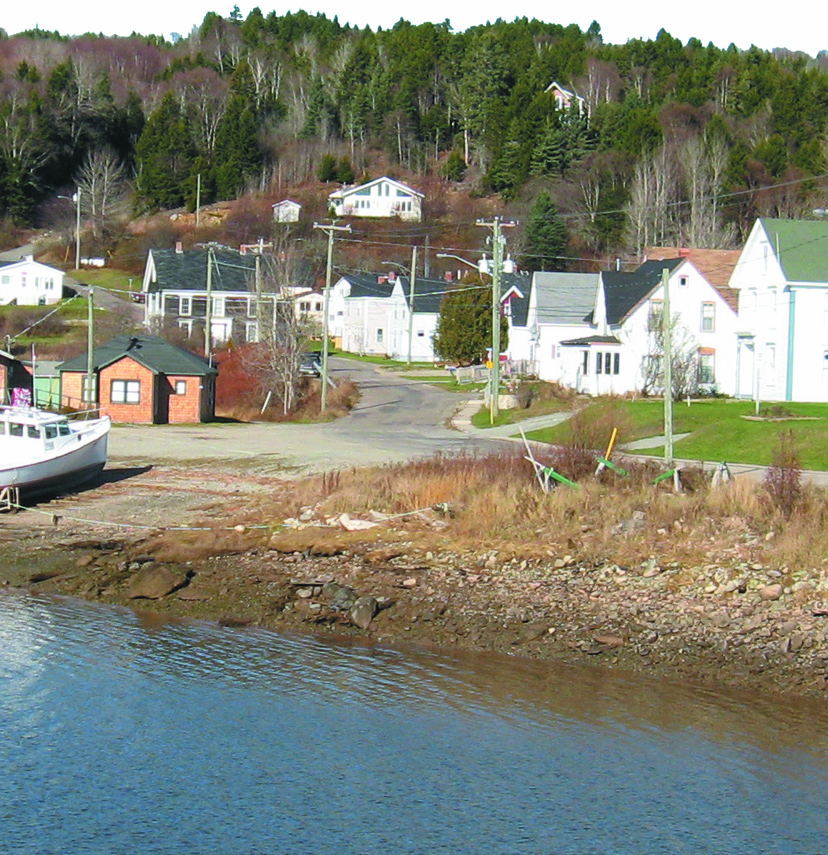
View from Alma Bridge.

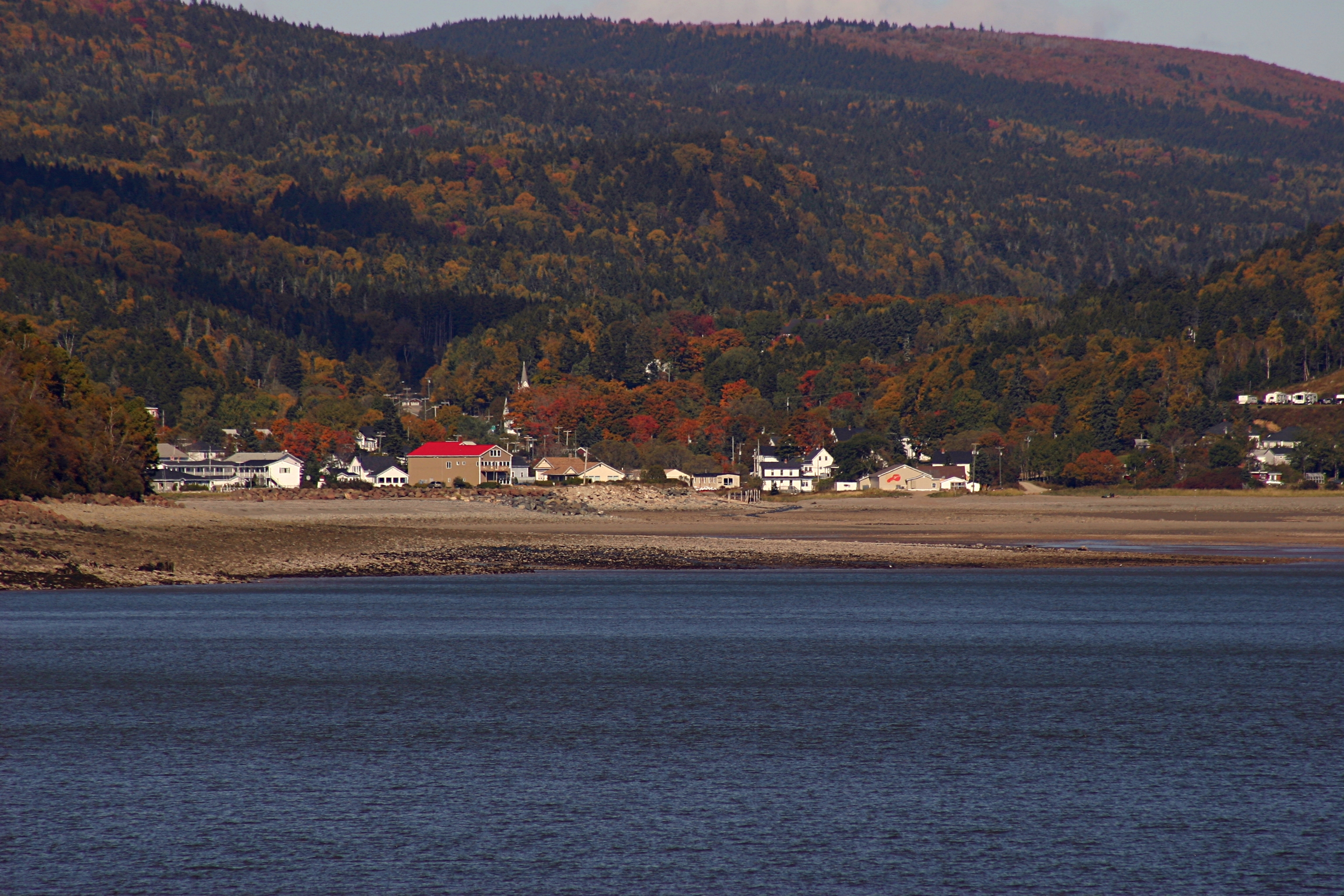
Alma as viewed from the water

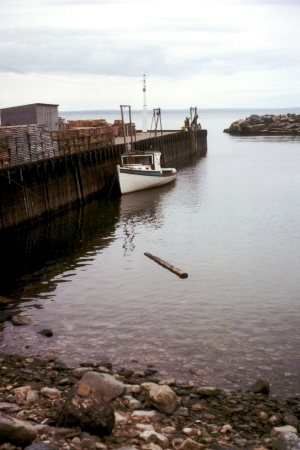
Harbour at high tide.

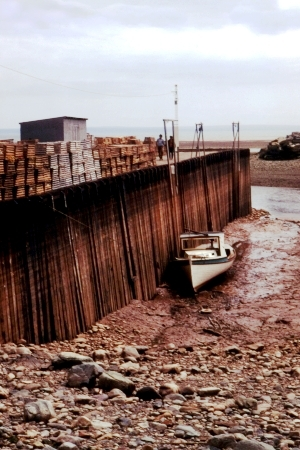
Harbour at low tide.

== See also ==
- 2023 New Brunswick local governance reform
- List of communities in New Brunswick
- List of municipalities in New Brunswick
