= Salisbury Parish =

Salisbury
- Parish
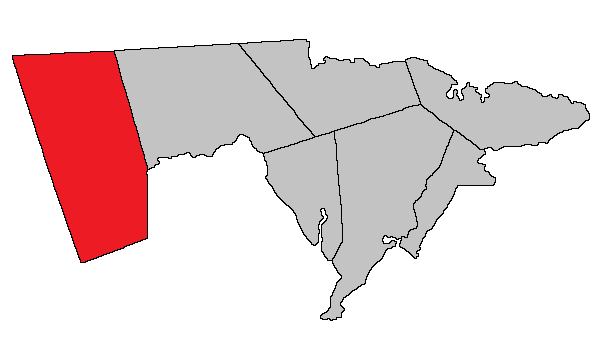
- Location within Westmorland County, New Brunswick.
- Coordinates: 47.67°N 67.45°W
- Country: Canada
- Province: New Brunswick
- County: Westmorland County
- Erected: 1787

Area
  - Land: 874.00 km^{2} (337.45 sq mi)

Population (2021)
  - Total: 3,377
  - Density: 3.9/km^{2} (10/sq mi)
  - Change 2016-2021: ▼0.3%
  - Dwellings: 1,432
- Time zone: UTC-4 (AST)
  - Summer (DST): UTC-3 (ADT)
- Figures do not include portions within the villages of Petitcodiac and Salisbury

Salisbury is a geographic parish in Westmorland County, New Brunswick, Canada. (Note: The Territorial Division Act divides the province into 152 parishes, the cities of Saint John and Fredericton, and one town of Grand Falls. The Interpretation Act clarifies that parishes include any local government within their borders.)

For governance purposes it is divided between the town of Salisbury, the village of Three Rivers, and the Southeast rural district. All are members of the Southeast Regional Service Commission.

Prior to the 2023 governance reform, the parish was divided between a much smaller village of Salisbury, the village of Petitcodiac, and the local service district of the parish of Salisbury, part of which was included in the special service area of Havelock Inside, which extended from the LSD of the parish of Havelock. Petitcodiac is now part of Three Rivers.

== Origin of name ==
The origin of Salisbury's name is uncertain.

William F. Ganong states it was "perhaps" due to it extending nearly to Salisbury Bay, a former name of Rocher Bay.

The Provincial Archives of New Brunswick gives two possibilities: Sir John Salbusbury, who accompanied Edward Cornwallis on his mission to establish Nova Scotia; or Salisbury, a city in Wiltshire, England.

== Boundary History ==
Salisbury was erected in 1787 from the unassigned land west of Hillsborough, Hopewell, and Moncton Parishes.

In 1837 the western boundary of Westmorland County was altered, implicitly altering the western line of Salisbury.

In 1838 the southeastern part of Salisbury was included in the newly erected Harvey Parish.

In 1845 Albert County was erected from Westmorland County, with the county line running through Salisbury.

In 1846 the county line with Albert was moved to its present location; the part of Salisbury south and east of the new line was transferred to Coverdale and Harvey Parishes.

In 1894 the existing boundaries of Salisbury were declared retroactive to its erection.

== Boundaries ==
Salisbury Parish is bounded:

- on the north by the Kent County line;
- on the east beginning on the county line about 3.5 kilometres west of Route 126, at the prolongation of the eastern line of a large tract granted to Martin Gay and Associates, then southerly along the prolongation to the Petitcodiac River at a point about 200 metres upriver of the mouth of Little River, then upriver to the western line of Albert County, then along Albert County;
- on the south by Albert County;
- on the west by the Kings County and Queens County lines.

== Communities ==
Communities at least partly within the parish. bold indicates an incorporated municipality

- Dobsons Corner
- Fawcett
- Fawcett Hill
- Fredericton Road
- Glenvale
- Harewood
- Hicksville
- Hillgrove
- Intervale
- Kay Settlement
- Killams Mills
- Kinnear Settlement
- Lewis Mountain
- Monteagle
- North Branch
- **Petitcodiac**
  - Petitcodiac East
- Pollett River
- River Glade
- **Salisbury**
- Scott Road
- Second North River
- Steeves Settlement
- The Glades
- Upper Ridge
- Wheaton Settlement

== Bodies of water ==
Bodies of water (Note: Not including brooks, ponds or coves.) at least partly within the parish.

- Anagance River
- Canaan River
- North River
- Petitcodiac River
- Pollett River
- Intervale Creek

== Other notable places ==
Parks, historic sites, and other noteworthy places at least partly within the parish.

- Canaan Bog Protected Natural Area
- Canaan River Wildlife Management Area

== Demographics ==
Parish population total does not include Petitcodiac and portion within the village of Salisbury

=== Population ===
Historical Populations: Salisbury Parish, NB
Year	Pop.	±%
1991	3,443	—
1996	3,524	+2.4%
2001	3,382	−4.0%
2006	3,425	+1.3%
2011	3,417	−0.2%
2016	3,388	−0.8%

=== Language ===
Mother tongue (2016)

Language	Population	Pct (%)
English only	3,195	95.7%
French only	80	2.4%
Both English and French	10	0.3%
Other languages	55	1.6%

== Access routes ==
Highways and numbered routes that run through the parish, including external routes that start or finish at the parish limits:

- **Highways**
  - Route 1
  - Route 2 (TCH)
- **Principal Routes**
  - Route 112
  - Route 106
- Secondary Routes:
  - Route 880
  - Route 885
  - Route 890
  - Route 905
- External Routes:
  - None

== See also ==
- List of parishes in New Brunswick
