= Hillsborough Parish =

Hillsborough
- Parish
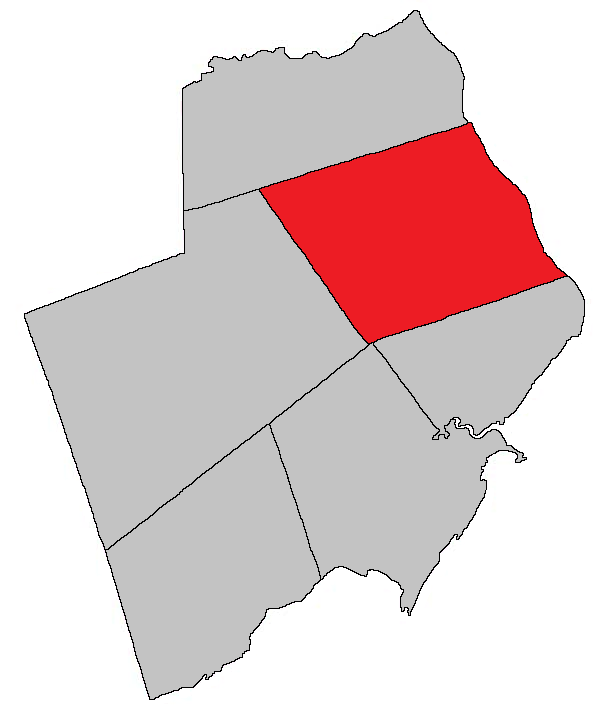
- Location within Albert County.
- Coordinates: 45.92°N 64.70°W
- Country: Canada
- Province: New Brunswick
- County: Albert County
- Erected: 1786

Area
  - Land: 304.03 km^{2} (117.39 sq mi)

Population (2021)
  - Total: 1,397
  - Density: 4.6/km^{2} (12/sq mi)
  - Change 2016-2021: ▲6.8%
  - Dwellings: 656
- Time zone: UTC-4 (AST)
  - Summer (DST): UTC-3 (ADT)
- Figures do not include portion within the village of Hillsborough

Hillsborough is a geographic parish in eastern Albert County, New Brunswick, Canada. (Note: The Territorial Division Act divides the province into 152 parishes, the cities of Saint John and Fredericton, and one town of Grand Falls. The Interpretation Act clarifies that parishes include any local government within their borders.)

For governance purposes, Hillsborough is divided between the village of Fundy Albert, which includes most of the parish, and the Southeast rural district; both are members of the Southeast Regional Service Commission.

Prior to the 2023 governance reform, the parish was divided between the village of Hillsborough and the local service district of the parish of Hillsborough.

== Origin of name ==
Hillsborough was probably named in honour of the Earl of Hillsborough, First Lord of Trade in 1765.

== History ==
Hillsborough was originally established in 1765 as a township within Nova Scotia, a grant of 100 000 acres to Robert Cummings and four others that included modern Hillsborough Parish and most of Coverdale Parish. In 1786 the township's boundaries were explicitly used for the newly erected Hillsborough Parish.

== Boundaries ==
Hillsborough Parish is bounded:

- on the north by the northern line of a grant to Albert E. Rogers on the Petitcodiac River, about 120 metres south of the mouth of Stoney Creek, and its prolongation inland to a point about 2.6 kilometres east of Little River;
- on the east by the Petitcodiac River;
- on the south by the southern line of a grant to William Carlisle on the Petitcodiac River, about 2 kilometres north of the junction of Grub Road with Route 114, and its prolongation southwesterly for to a point 12 miles (19 km) inland;
- on the west by a line running north 22º west (Note: By the magnet of 1765, when declination in the area was between 14º and 15º west of north.) to the prolongation of the Rogers grant.

=== Evolution of boundaries ===
Originally the western line of Hillsborough extended north to the Petitcodiac River west of Upper Coverdale.

In 1828 all of the parish north of a line running west from the mouth of Stoney Creek was erected as Coverdale Parish.

The northern boundary was moved slightly south in 1850 to its modern starting point. 1850 was also the first year the parish's southern and western boundaries were described without referring to the original boundaries of the pre-Loyalist township.

== Municipality ==
The village of Hillsborough is on the Petitcodiac River, from south of Weldon Creek to north of Christopher Lane; the inland boundary is irregular, based partly on grant lines and partly on property lines of the late 1960s.

== Local service district ==
The local service district of the parish of Hillsborough included the entire parish outside the village of Hillsborough.

The LSD was established on 23 November 1966 to assess for fire protection following the abolition of rural governments by the new Municipalities Act. First aid & ambulance services were added on 17 November 1976.

In 2020, the LSD assessed for community & recreation services in addition to the basic LSD services of fire protection, police services, land use planning, emergency measures, and dog control. The taxing authority was 615.00 Hillsborough.

== Communities ==
Communities at least partly within the parish; bold indicates an incorporated municipality

- Albert Mines
- Baltimore
- Beech Hill
- Berryton
- Caledonia Mountain
- Dawson Settlement
- Demoiselle Creek
- Edgetts Landing
- **Hillsborough**
  - Surrey
- Isaiah Corner
- Osborne Corner
- Rosevale
- Salem
- Shenstone
- Steeves Mills
- Steevescote
- Weldon

== Bodies of water ==
Bodies of water (Note: Not including brooks, ponds or coves.) at least partly in the parish:

- Petitcodiac River
- Stoney Creek
- Turtle Creek - East Branch, West Branch
- at least seven other named creeks
- Stanyard Lake

== Islands ==
Islands at least partly in the parish:

- Grays Island

== Other notable places ==
Parks, historic sites, and other noteworthy places at least partly in the parish.

- Big Meadows Protected Natural Area
- Caledonia Gorge Protected Natural Area
- Lewis Mountain Protected Natural Area
- Wilson Brook Protected Natural Area

== Demographics ==
=== Population ===
Parish population total does not include the village of Hillsborough

Historical population
Year	Pop.	±%
1991	1,477	—
1996	1,532	+3.7%
2001	1,474	−3.8%
2006	1,473	−0.1%
2011	1,395	−5.3%
2016	1,308	−6.2%

=== Language ===
Mother tongue (2016)

Language	Population	Pct (%)
English only	1,250	95.4%
French only	40	3.1%
Both English and French	5	0.4%
Other languages	15	1.1%

== Access Routes ==
Highways and numbered routes that run through the parish, including external routes that start or finish at the parish limits:

- **Highways**
  - Route 114
- **Principal Routes**
  - None
- Secondary Routes:
  - Route 910
- External Routes:
  - None
