= Waterside =

Waterside may refer to:

== Places ==
=== Canada ===
- RBC Waterside Centre, a commercial development in Halifax, Nova Scotia
- Waterside, New Brunswick

=== Nigeria ===
- Aba River (Nigeria), also known as Waterside

=== United Kingdom ===
- Waterside, East Ayrshire
- Waterside, Buckinghamshire
- Waterside, Cumbria
- Waterside, Derry
- Waterside, East Dunbartonshire
- Romsey and Waterside, the former name of the Romsey parliament constituency
- Waterside, Lancashire

=== United States ===
- Waterside District / Waterside Festival Marketplace - Norfolk, Virginia
- Waterside Plaza, a large residential complex located along the East River in Manhattan
- Waterside Shops, an open-air mall located just north of Naples, Florida

== Other ==
- Waterside (album), a 2021 album by British singer/songwriter Gary Hughes
- Waterside (building), the corporate headquarters of the airline British Airways located at Harmondsworth, UK
- Waterside Karori, a current New Zealand football club, formed by the amalgamation of Waterside and Karori Swifts
