= New Brunswick Route 910 =

Highway in New Brunswick, Canada

Coordinates: 45.892637°N 64.875984°W

Route 910

Route information
- Maintained by New Brunswick Department of Transportation
- Length: 45.6 km (28.3 mi)

Major junctions
- North end: Route 112 between Coverdale and Middle Coverdale
- South end: Route 114 in Hillsborough

Location
- Country: Canada
- Province: New Brunswick

Highway system
- Provincial highways in New Brunswick; Former routes
← Route 895	→ Route 915

Route 910 is a 45.6-kilometre (28.3 mi) long north to south secondary highway in the southern portion of New Brunswick, Canada.

== Route description ==
Most of the route is in Albert County.

The route's northern terminus is between Coverdale and Middle Coverdale at Route 112. It travels southwest through a mostly treed area where it begins following the Turtle Creek passing through Lower Turtle Creek. The route continues south crossing the Turtle Creek Reservoir then continuing through Turtle Creek, then Berryton and Rosevale. Here the route makes a sharp turn northwest passing Caledonia Mountain, Baltimore and Osborne Corner. As the route continues, it passes through Beech Hill, Shenstone, and Isaiah Corner. The route then crosses Weldon Creek into Salem where it is now known as the Salem Rd and ends in Hillsborough at Route 114 near Greys Island Cemetery.
