= Caledonia Regional High School =

Location
- 35 School Lane; Hillsborough, New Brunswick, E4H 3B8; Canada
- Coordinates: 45.928647°N 64.652427°W

Information
- School type: Public High school
- Founded: 1974
- School board: Anglophone East School District
- Superintendent: Randolph MacLEAN
- Principal: Emily Ostler Colpitts
- Vice principal: Erin Leger
- Staff: 35
- Grades: 6-12
- Language: English, French immersion
- Colours: Black and Gold
- Mascot: tacos
- Team name: Tigers
- Website: caledonia.nbed.ca

Caledonia Regional High School is a Canadian secondary school in Hillsborough, New Brunswick. It is a “Centre of Academic Excellence” according to the local news media and the least populated high school in all of Anglophone East School District.

Caledonia Regional has approximately 270 students enrolled in grades 6 through 12. The school also serves the communities Riverside-Albert and Alma in addition to the communities from Stoney Creek to Fundy National Park. The school offers Late French Immersion.

== See also ==
- List of schools in New Brunswick
- Anglophone South School District
