= Toms Island (New Brunswick) =

Island in New Brunswick, Canada

- Interactive map of Toms Island

Geography
- Location: Bay of Fundy
- Coordinates: 45.6509°N 64.7267°W

Administration
- Canada
- Province: New Brunswick
- County: Albert
- Parish: Harvey

Toms Island is an undeveloped tidal island in the Two Rivers Inlet, in Harvey Parish, Albert County, New Brunswick, Canada.

It is owned by the Nature Conservancy of Canada.
