= New Brunswick Railway Museum =

Canadian railway museum located in Hillsborough, New Brunswick

Coordinates: 45.9232°N 64.6447°W

Salem and Hillsborough Railroad
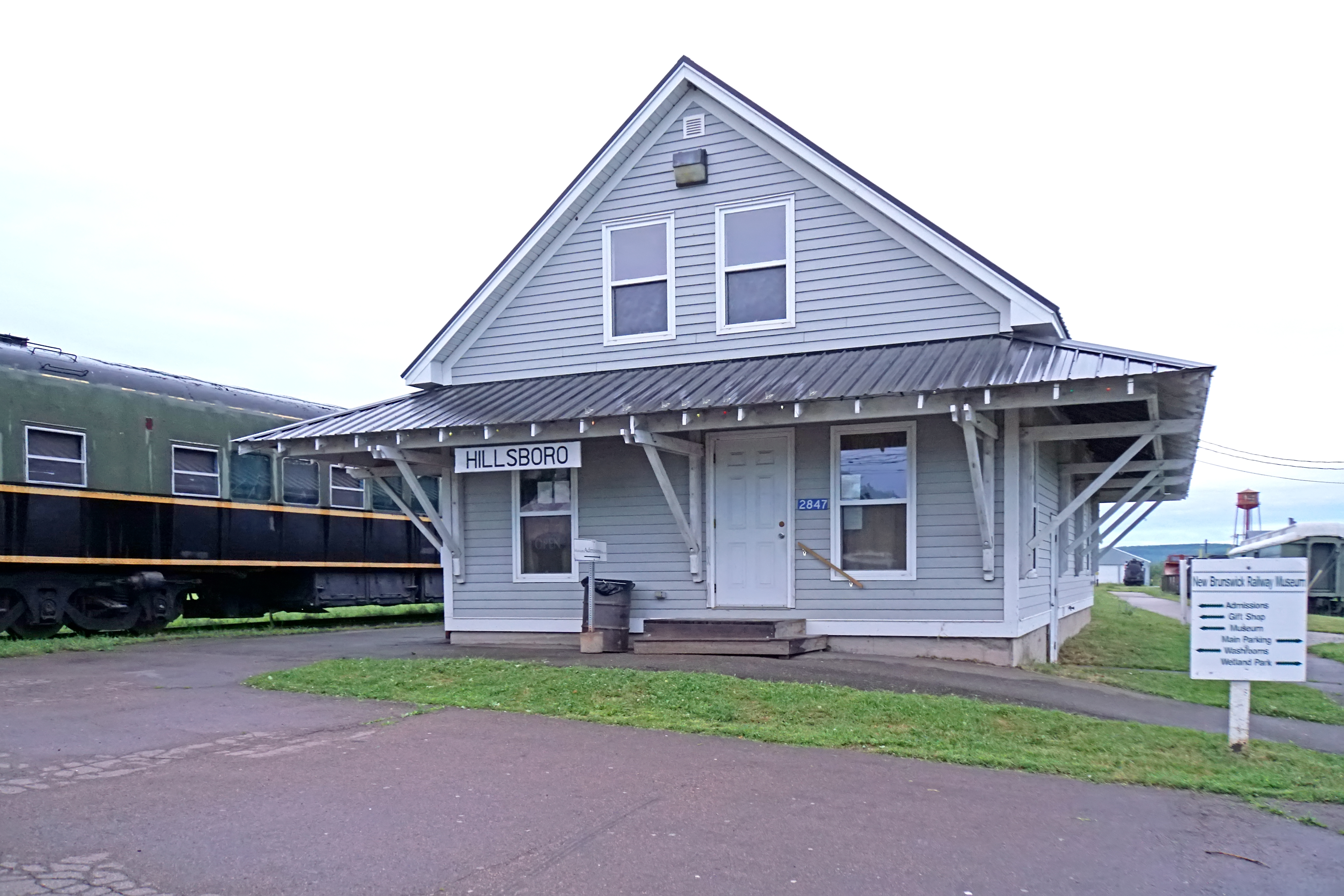
- Locale: New Brunswick, Canada
- Terminus: Salisbury; Hillsborough

Commercial operations
- Built by: Canadian National Railway
- Original gauge: 4 ft 8 1/2 in (1,435 mm)

Preserved operations
- Reporting mark: SHRR
- Preserved gauge: 4 ft 8 1/2 in (1,435 mm)

Commercial history
- Opened: 1877
- Closed: 1970s

Preservation history
- 1982: Opened
- Headquarters: Hillsborough

Website
- New Brunswick Railway Museum

The New Brunswick Railway Museum, owned and operated by the Canadian Railroad Historical Association, New Brunswick Division, is a museum located in Hillsborough, New Brunswick consisting of the railway's line last remaining steam engine. It was formerly known as the Salem and Hillsborough Railroad (S&H) before the rails were superseded by Highway 114.

The Salem and Hillsborough Railroad was formed in 1982 by a group of volunteer railroad enthusiasts and retired railroad employees. They took possession of a section of former Canadian National branch line trackage which ran from CN's Moncton-Saint John mainline at Salisbury east to just beyond the village of Hillsborough, approximately 20 miles (32 km) away. CN had operated this subdivision to service a gypsum quarry until the late 1970s when the quarry was closed, resulting in the company applying for abandonment. The first trial trains operated in 1983, and the line opened to the public in 1984.

The S&H initially operated historic CN and Canadian Pacific steam locomotives Numbers 29 and 1009, which had been used in New Brunswick until the early 1960s when both railways completely dieselized. A third steam locomotive, Sydney and Louisburg 42, was used briefly in the early-mid 1980s, but it was quickly removed from service to undergo boiler work. No. 42 was later returned to its owner, the Nova Scotia Museum of Industry. The S&H operated regular coach and dinner tourist trains between Hillsborough and a location halfway between Hillsborough and Salisbury, named Salem, from 1984 until 2004.

On 16 September 1994, a fire occurred which destroyed the engine-house and several engines and carriages within, as well as offices and historical records.

Since 2005 the site became a static museum as the New Brunswick Railway Museum, using the former excursion train as a centrepoint.

== See also ==
- List of heritage railways in Canada
- List of museums in Canada
