= Hillsborough, New Brunswick =

Hillsborough
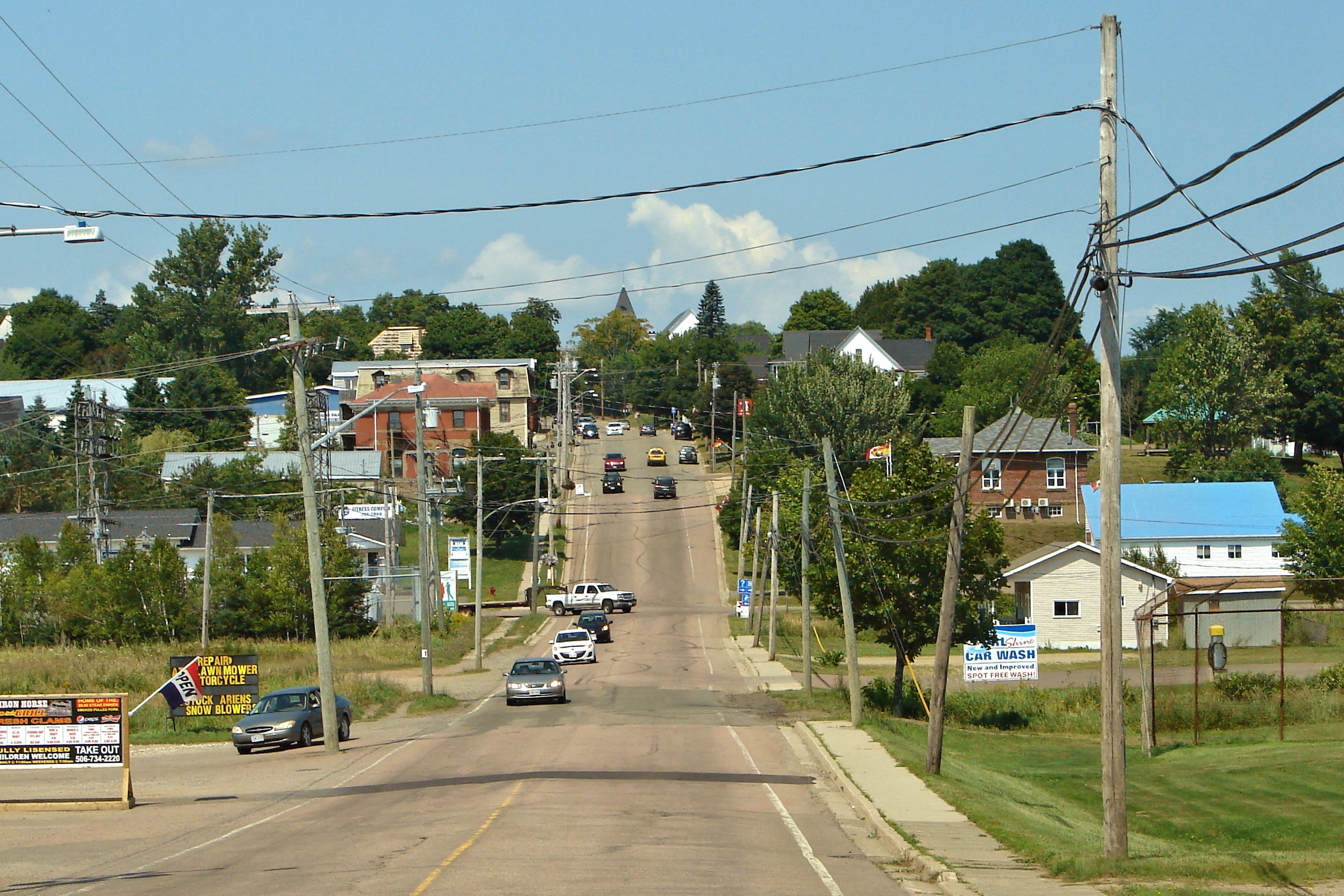
- Main Street (Route 114) looking north

- Seal

- Location of Hillsborough, New Brunswick
- Coordinates: 45.92277°N 64.64523°W
- Country: Canada
- Province: New Brunswick
- County: Albert County
- Parish: Hillsborough Parish
- Municipality: Fundy Albert
- Founded: 1700s
- Incorporated Village: 1966

Area
  - Total: 12.81 km^{2} (4.95 sq mi)
  - Land: 12.81 km^{2} (4.95 sq mi)

Population (2021)
  - Total: 1,348
  - Density: 105.2/km^{2} (272/sq mi)
  - Change (2016–21): ▲5.6%
- Time zone: UTC-4 (Atlantic (AST))
  - Summer (DST): UTC-3 (Atlantic (ADT))
- Canadian Postal code: E
- Area code: 506
- Telephone Exchange: 203 734
- Highway: Route 114; Route 910
- Website: villageofhillsborough.ca

Hillsborough is a former village in Albert County in the province of New Brunswick, Canada. It was an incorporated village prior to 2023 but is now part of the much larger incorporated village of Fundy Albert.

Hillsborough is on a hill overlooking the Petitcodiac River near the intersection of Route 910 and Route 114. It is the largest settlement in Hillsborough Parish.

== History ==
Originally established around 1700 as "Blanchard's Village" by Acadian farmers, they lived here for sixty years, building dykes that are still in use. Before the Great Expulsion of the Acadians in 1755, the area was almost 100% French. Now, few Acadians live there, though there are several Acadian settlements on the opposite bank of the Petitcodiac River, such as Pre d'en Haut, New Brunswick.

On September 4, 1755, the Battle of Petitcodiac was fought near Hillsborough. After the capture of Fort Beausejour during the Seven Years' War, in an attempt to gain control over the region, the British sent a punitive expedition consisting of two companies of British colonial troops into the Petitcodiac River Valley to destroy the Acadian settlements located there. While the main body finished their operation on the eastern bank, a detachment was dispatched to the western bank. When the detachment under Major Joseph Frye approached Blanchard's Village, located near where Hillsborough now stands, it encountered French forces under the command of Captain Charles Deschamps de Boishébert and was driven off with heavy losses. The site is marked by a National Historic Sites and Monument plaque.

On July 1, 1763, a group of settlers from Pennsylvania arrived in the area, led by Matthias Somers, Michael Lutz, Jacob Trietz (Trites), Charles Jones, and Heinrich Stieff (Steeves). Heinrich Steeves had seven sons and the name Steeves is still common among residents.

On 1 January 2023, Hillsborough amalgamated with the villages of Alma and Riverside-Albert and parts of five local service districts to form the new village of Fundy Albert. The community's name remains in official use.

== Demographics ==
In the 2021 Census of Population conducted by Statistics Canada, Hillsborough had a population of 1,348 living in 559 of its 590 total private dwellings, a change of 5.6% from its 2016 population of 1,277. With a land area of 12.81 km^{2} (4.95 sq mi), it had a population density of 105.2/km^{2} (272.5/sq mi) in 2021.

Historical population
Year	Pop.	±%
1981	1,239	—
1986	1,214	−2.0%
1996	1,272	+4.8%
2001	1,288	+1.3%
2006	1,292	+0.3%
2011	1,350	+4.5%
2016	1,277	−5.4%
2021	1,348	+5.6%

== Places of note ==
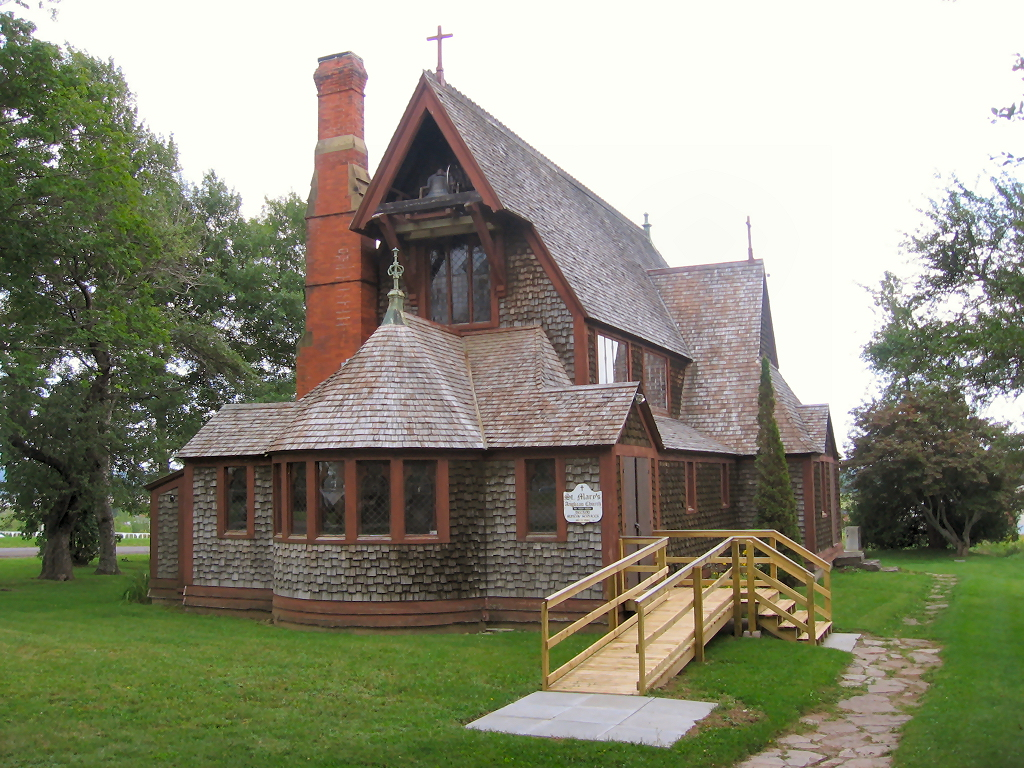
View of St. Mary's Anglican Church in Hillsborough, New Brunswick. Note the bell under the peak in the roof.

- Hillsborough is home to the Albert County Chamber of Commerce and the historic New Brunswick Railway Museum and the Hon. William Henry Steeves House Museum.
- Grays Island is a cemetery.
- Surrey was amalgamated into Hillsborough.

== Education ==
- Caledonia Regional High School
- Hillsborough Elementary School

== Notable people ==
- William Steeves, one of the Fathers of Confederation
- Hugh McMonagle
- William James Lewis
- Neil McNeil, former Catholic archbishop of Toronto, was a native of Hillsborough.
- Burpee L. Steeves Lieutenant Governor of Idaho

== See also ==
- List of communities in New Brunswick
