= Mechanic Settlement, New Brunswick =

Coordinates: 45°44′N 65°12′W

Location of Mechanic Settlement in New Brunswick

Mechanic Settlement is a community in Kings County, New Brunswick, Canada. Its population is approximately 100. It is beside Fundy National Park on Route 114.

== History ==
It was founded in 1843 by a group of mechanics and laborers from Saint John, New Brunswick.

It had a post office, from 1853 to 1928.

In November 2010, the community received more than 291mm of rain.

== See also ==
- List of communities in New Brunswick
