= Riverside-Albert =

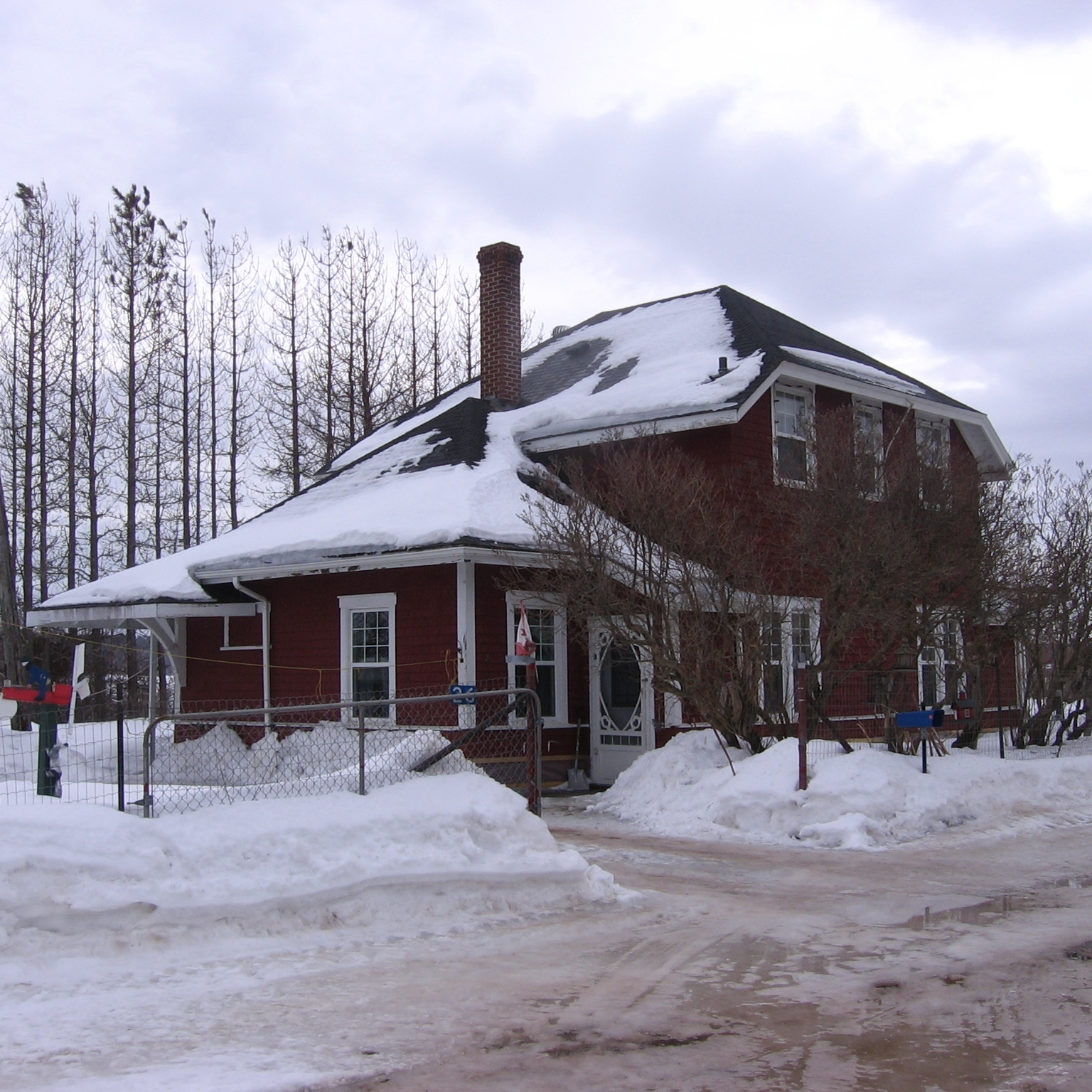
- Former train station in Riverside-Albert

- Location of Riverside-Albert, New Brunswick
- Coordinates: 45°45′5.1″N 64°43′3.6″W
- Country: Canada
- Province: New Brunswick
- County: Albert County
- Parish: Hopewell Parish
- Municipality: Fundy Albert
- Incorporated: 1966
- Amalgamated: 2023

Government
  - Type: Village council

Area
  - Land: 3.39 km^{2} (1.31 sq mi)

Population (2021)
  - Total: 348
  - Density: 102.8/km^{2} (266/sq mi)
  - Change (2016–21): ▼0.6%

Electoral districts
  - Federal: Fundy Royal
  - Provincial: Albert
- Time zone: UTC-4 (Atlantic (AST))
  - Summer (DST): UTC-3 (Atlantic (ADT))
- Canadian Postal code: E4H
- Area codes: 506, 428
- Telephone Exchange: 882
- Highway: Route 114; Route 915
- Website: http://www.riverside-albert.ca

Riverside-Albert is a disincorporated village in Fundy Albert, New Brunswick, Canada. It resides in the geographic parish of Hopewell in Albert County.

Riverside-Albert is located on the north of Shepody River on upland above the marsh. The community of Harvey Parish is located across the river. It is approximately halfway between two major tourist destinations: Fundy National Park and the Hopewell Rocks.

Post office called Albert from 1875; Riverside from 1875 to 1932; Riverside from 1932.

The Trans Canada Trail passes through Riverside-Albert.

== History ==
Following the French period, Acadian settlers remained under English rule and continued developing the community of Shepody, which included the Riverside-Albert area. In the aftermath of the Acadian Expulsion in 1755, Nova Scotia Governor Lawrence invited applications for township grants. This begat Hopewell Township of Cumberland County on the location of Shepody. Hopewell's slow beginning grew pace during the rapid growth of the lumbering and ship building industries along the Bay, and Hopewell's communities benefited from the easy access to it at Hopewell's riversides.

Riverside and Albert both appear as communities on the cadastral land grant map of the area.

Albert was originally called Hopewell Corner but the inhabitants resolved to rename it Albert in 1881 due to there being four communities named Hopewell within 12 miles of each other. In 1898 Albert was the terminus of the Salisbury and Harvey Railway, with a population of 500.

Riverside, originally River Side, was a station on the Salisbury and Hillsborough Railway, with a population of 300 in 1871. The post office was renamed Riverside in 1932.

The local improvement district of Riverside-Albert was incorporated on 29 December 1947. The local improvement district became a village in 1966 under the new Municipalities Act.

On 1 January 2023, the village of Riverside-Albert amalgamated with the villages of Alma and Hillsborough and parts of eight local service districts to form the new village of Fundy Albert. The community's name remains in official use.

== Demographics ==
In the 2021 Census of Population conducted by Statistics Canada, Riverside-Albert had a population of 348 living in 142 of its 154 total private dwellings, a change of −0.6% from its 2016 population of 350. With a land area of 3.39 km^{2} (1.31 sq mi), it had a population density of 102.7/km^{2} (265.9/sq mi) in 2021.

== Notable people ==
Notable residents have included Abner Reid McClelan and Roscoe Fillmore.

== See also ==
- List of communities in New Brunswick
- Royal eponyms in Canada
