= New Brunswick Route 114 =

Highway in New Brunswick

Route 114

Route information
- Maintained by New Brunswick Department of Transportation
- Length: 137.63 km (85.52 mi)
- Existed: 1965–present

Major junctions
- West end: Route 1 / Route 111 in Sussex Corner
- Route 1 in Penobsquis
- East end: Route 15 / Route 106 in Moncton

Location
- Country: Canada
- Province: New Brunswick
- Major cities: Alma, Riverside-Albert, Hillsborough, Riverview

Highway system
- Provincial highways in New Brunswick; Former routes
← Route 113	→ Route 115

Route 114 is a 137.6 km (85.5 mi) Canadian secondary highway in southeastern New Brunswick.

The route is the primary road serving the eastern part of Albert County and Fundy National Park.

== Route description ==
Route 114's western terminus is at Route 1 exit 198 at the northern terminus of Route 111 near Sussex Corner. From there, the route follows the former Trans-Canada Highway through Penobsquis, then Crockets Corner where it breaks away from Portage Vale Rd and turns southeast passing through Springdale then, Mechanic Settlement. The Route then enters the North-East Entrance of Fundy National Park. At the park's headquarters, Route 114 descends a hill to the village of Alma where it is known as Main Street.

The route continues north-east passing the western terminus of Route 915, then West River, Germantown, Beaver Brook, and Riverside-Albert, taking the name King Street. The road briefly turns north at the eastern terminus of Route 915 before continuing to run along the western coast of Shepody Bay to passing through Hopewell Hill, Shepody, Mountville, Cape Station, Lower Cape and then Hopewell Cape.

Following the west bank of the Petitcodiac River, Route 114 turns north through Hillsborough, becoming known as Main Street, passing the eastern terminus of Route 910, Weldon, Stoney Creek, Lower Coverdale to Riverview, becoming known as Hillsborough Road. Route 114 passes the Gunningsville Bridge then crosses the Petitcodiac River Causeway at the western terminus of Route 112 where it is known as Findlay Blvd as it enters Moncton, where it ends at a traffic circle connecting with Route 106 and Route 15.

In 2019, Route 114 received $4 million, provincially and federally-funded, in funding for receiving improvements.

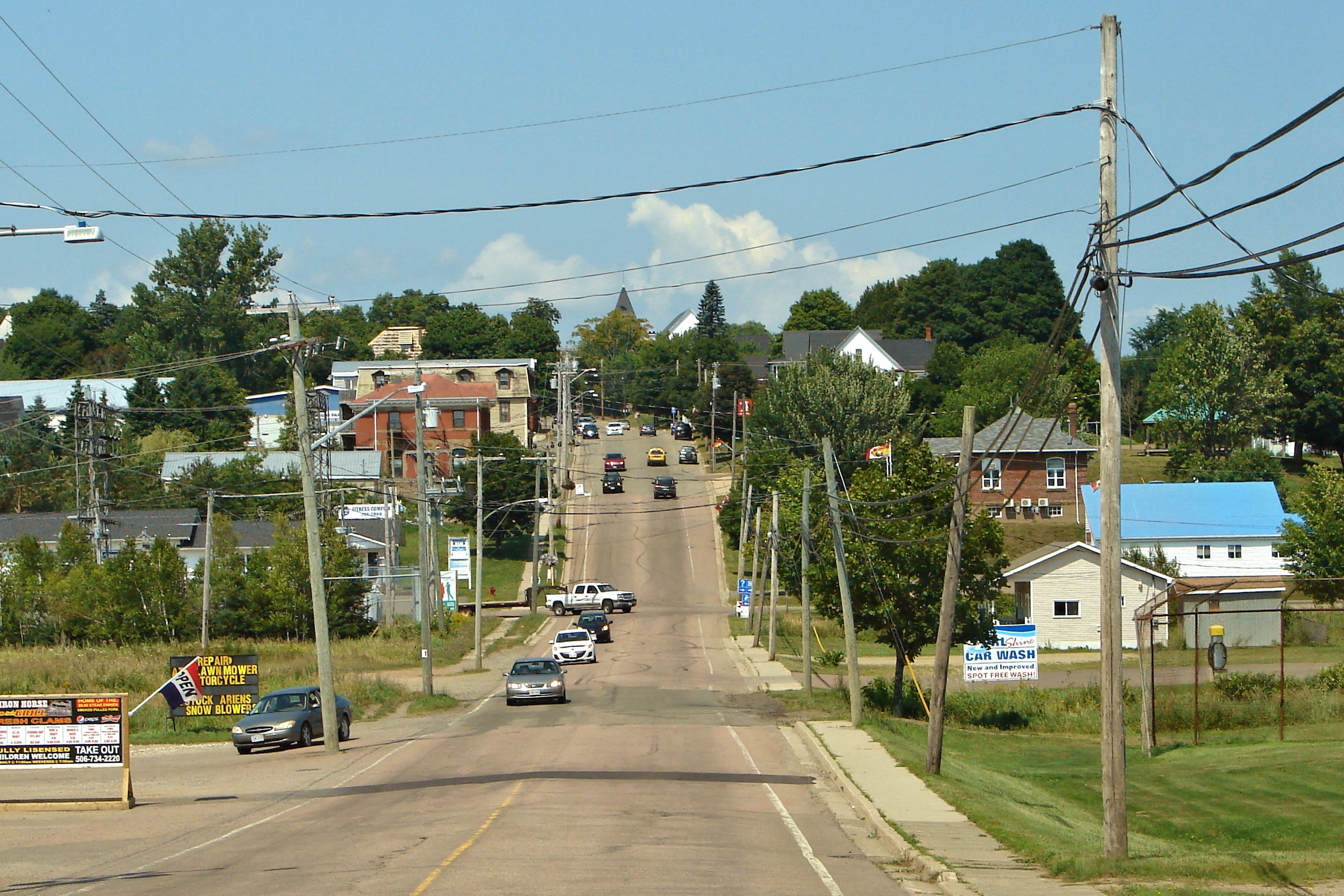
Route 114 (Main Street) in Hillsborough

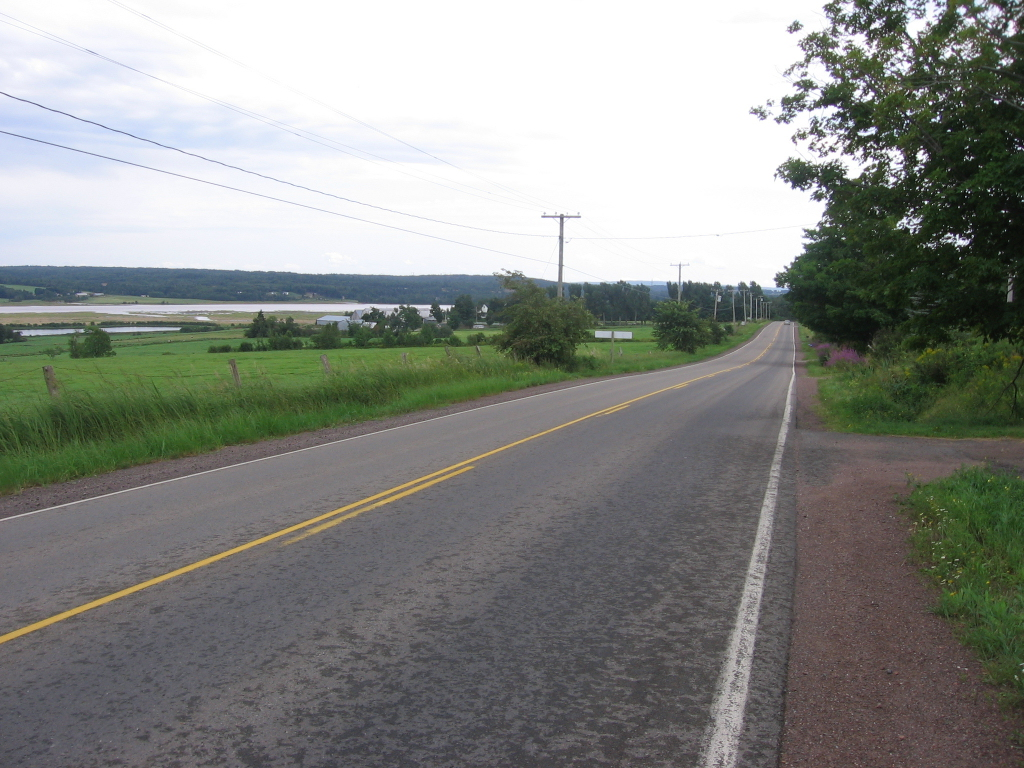
Route 114 passes through Lower Coverdale on the eastern edge of the town of Riverview. The road parallels the south and east bank of the Petitcodiac River from Riverview to Riverside-Albert.

== See also ==
- List of New Brunswick provincial highways
