= Second North River, New Brunswick =

Community in New Brunswick, Canada

Coordinates: 46.070015°N 65.074768°W

Second North River is a Canadian Community, located in Westmorland County, New Brunswick. The Community is situated in southeastern New Brunswick, to the West of Moncton. Second North River is part of Greater Moncton. This community is built around the Route 112 and Route 880.

== See also ==
- List of communities in New Brunswick

== Bordering communities ==
- Steeves Mountain, New Brunswick
- Salisbury, New Brunswick
- Monteagle, New Brunswick
- Moncton, New Brunswick
- Pacific Junction, New Brunswick
- Lewis Mountain, New Brunswick
- Wheaton Settlement, New Brunswick
- River Glade, New Brunswick
