= Shepody, New Brunswick =

Coordinates: 45°46′13″N 64°39′24″W

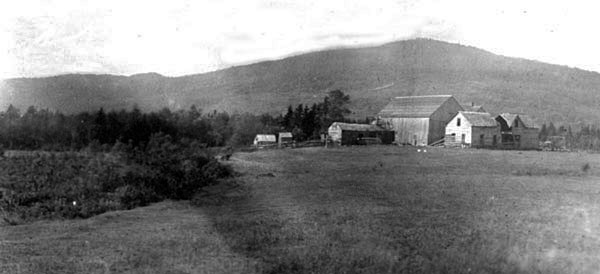
Shepody, c. 1895

Shepody is a rural community in southeastern New Brunswick, Canada, situated on Shepody Bay, along Route 114 between Hopewell Hill and Lower Cape to the east.

Shepody or Chipoudie also distinguishes the area corresponding to the French period Acadian settlement, which populated both sides of the River by the same name, with its centre located north of the estuary at today's Hopewell Hill.

The name, which legend has it originates in Champlain's visit to the bay, is used in reference to places in both Westmorland and Albert county territorial divisions.

Shepody is a short distance west of the former Acadian settlement centre, and has a population of approximately twenty.

== History ==
Following the breakup of the principal grant of land (Hopewell Township, Cumberland County, Nova Scotia), settlement in the areas gained pace. As the Hopewell communities advanced, Shepody, NB became distinct from Hopewell in the early 20th century, while Hopewell became Hopewell Hill.

=== French Period ===
By 1701, poitevin Pierre Thibaudeau and members of his family (four sons and a friend) moved from Port Royal to Chipoudy, inaugurating another cluster of Acadian settlements there and on the Petitcodiac River. After that, his friend, Guillaume Blanchard and his two sons, founded and established themselves in Petitcodiac.

In August 1755, British Army Lieutenant Colonel Robert Monckton sent Captain Sylvanus Cobb to deport the population of Chipoudy. The English soldiers were sent to Beaubassin, Petitcodiac, Chipoudy, and Memramcook to take the Acadians prisoners. However, through guidance by the local missionary, Father LeGuerne, the Acadians hid in the woods. Then, on 26 August, Lieutenant Boishébert of Miramichi and 125 soldiers and a group of Micmacs, surprised 200 Englishmen, under the command of Major Joseph Frye. The English had set fire to the church of Chipoudy and 181 homes, as well as 250 houses in Petitcodiac. Boishébert gave the order to attack at the moment that the English were setting fire to the church of Petitcodiac. After three hours of fierce fighting, the English retreated, leaving behind 50 dead, and around 60 wounded. It was thus that 200 families were able to escape the deportation.

== Geography ==
The former village was situated on the west side of Shepody Bay, at the foot of Caledonian Hills, in the region where the ground is low, the Chipody marshes. It was part of most of the region of Trois-Rivières. The main water supply is the Chipoudy river. The village corresponds to approximately the territory that lies between Mary's Point and cap des Demoiselles, which is now in the Albert county, south-east of New Brunswick.

== See also ==
- List of communities in New Brunswick
