= New Horton, New Brunswick =

Community in New Brunswick, Canada

Coordinates: 45.668705°N 64.726896°W

Location of New Horton in New Brunswick

New Horton is a rural community in the Canadian province of New Brunswick, located in Albert County. New Horton is on Route 915. Its population is approximately 100, with a church, a cemetery and it is approximately an hour from Moncton.

== See also ==
- List of communities in New Brunswick
