= Hugh McMonagle =

Canadian politician

Hugh McMonagle (1817 – October 12, 1889) was an inn-keeper and political figure in New Brunswick, later a province of Canada. He represented King County in the Legislative Assembly of New Brunswick from 1856 to 1857.

He was born in Hillsborough, Albert County, the son of Cornelius McMonagle, a native of Ireland, and Anne Scott. McMonagle later settled in Sussex Corner. He was married twice: first to Margaret Roach and then to Mary Roach, her sister. McMonagle raised cows and work horses as well as raising and training pure-bred race horses. He introduced the Morgan horse to New Brunswick. McMonagle's horse Livingstone defeated George Gilbert's Retriever in the so-called "Great race of 1847".
