= Roscoe Fillmore =

Canadian political activist and author

Roscoe Alfred Fillmore
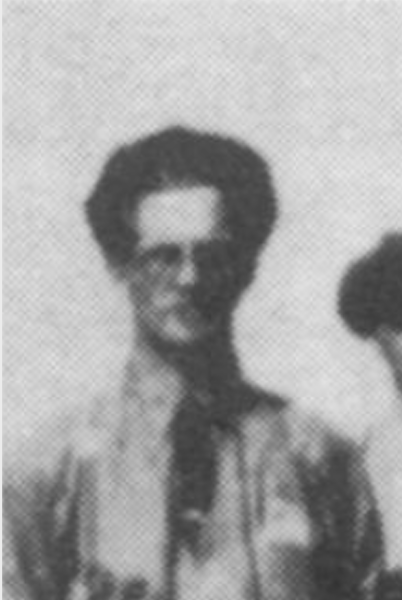
- Fillmore in Siberia, 1923
- Born: July 10, 1887; Lumsden, New Brunswick, Canada
- Died: November 20, 1968 (aged 81)
- Occupations: Political activist, horticulturalist, author
- Spouse: Margaret Munroe (m. 1913)

Roscoe Alfred Fillmore (10 July 1887 – 20 November 1968) was a Canadian radical political activist, horticulturalist, and author from New Brunswick and later Nova Scotia.

== Biography ==
Born in the tiny farming community of Lumsden, Albert County, New Brunswick, Fillmore's mother died in 1894 from tuberculosis at the age of 29. The village was abandoned not long thereafter due to declining soil quality and the family moved around Albert County for several years before settling in the village of Albert. Like his father and many working-class people from the region, Fillmore traveled to the United States for work. While in Portland, Maine, he heard a soapbox speaker for the Socialist Party and he started his path to socialism. Upon returning home, he eventually became the "region's most active socialist agitator" for the Socialist Party of Canada in the Maritimes before World War I. On November 10, 1909, he was arrested in Saint John for attempting to give a speech. He was charged with obstructing a sidewalk and ignoring police orders to move on. The case attracted the attention of "Big Bill" Haywood, one of the leading figures of the Industrial Workers of the World (IWW) who attempted to pay for his bail, which was declined by Fillmore who wanted to fight the case in court. His charges were later dropped.

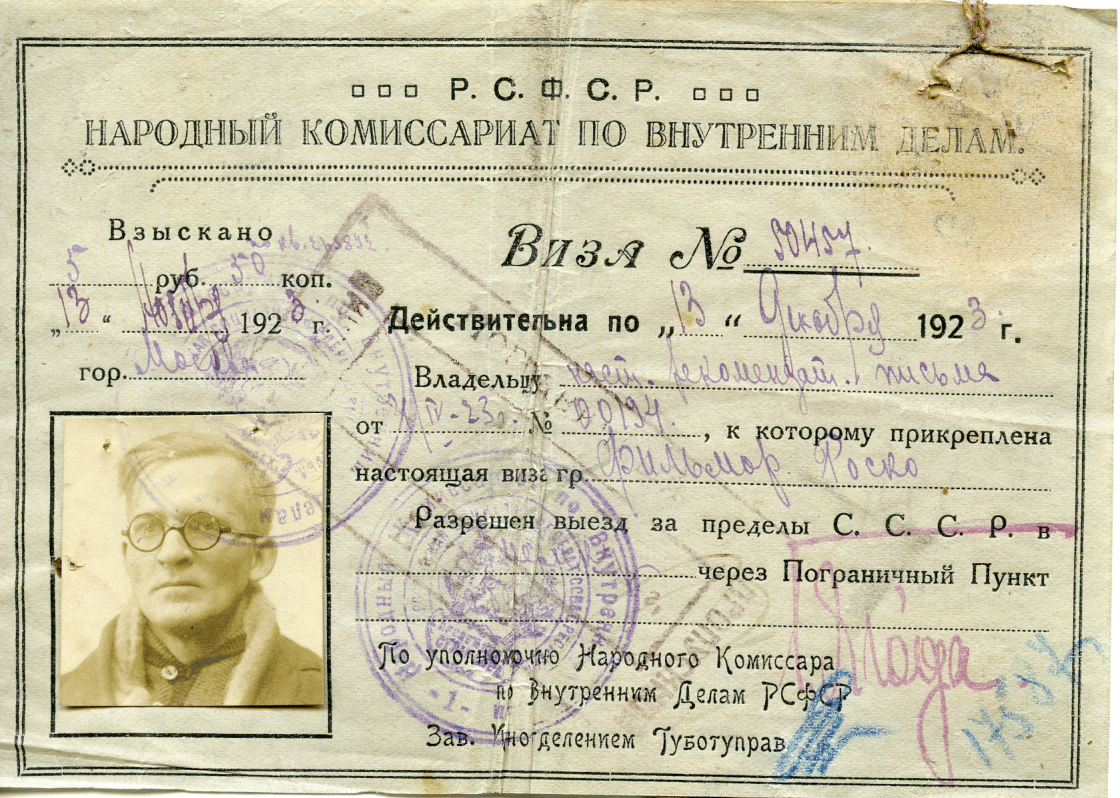
Fillmore's 1923 USSR entry visa

In the early 1920s, he joined the Communist Party of Canada and visited the Soviet Union, including spending time in 1923 on an experimental farm in Siberia. In 1924, he moved to Centreville, Kings, Nova Scotia, where he was a neighbour of fellow socialist Charles Macdonald. In 1940, the Communist Party was banned but Fillmore and others re-established the organization as the Labour-Progressive Party of Canada. In 1945, he was the LPP nominee for the Digby—Annapolis—Kings riding and received 362 votes (1.4%). He left the Communist Party in the 1950s but continued to be politically active until his death in 1968. Despite the fact he left the party, he was still followed and tracked by the RCMP for several years, including at the nursery he owned and funerals he attended.

He was an active writer for the Steelworker and Miner, a weekly newspaper for union workers in Nova Scotia. It was published in Sydney, Nova Scotia between 1933 and 1954 to around 30,000 subscribers.

He also published four books on gardening and was nicknamed "Mr. Green Thumbs" for his abilities. His papers are held by Dalhousie University in Halifax. The acquisition was considered, at the time, the "single most important acquisition" in the understanding of radical politics in Nova Scotia.

== Personal life ==
In 1913, Fillmore married Margaret Munroe. He moved to the Annapolis Valley in Nova Scotia in 1924, where he created an apple orchard. Fillmore also created the gardens at the Grand-Pré National Historic Site's memorial park in 1938, while he worked as its head gardener. His grandson, Nicholas Fillmore, published a book about Fillmore titled Maritime Radical: The Life and Times of Roscoe Fillmore.
