= Edgetts Landing, New Brunswick =

Human settlement in New Brunswick, Canada

Coordinates: 45.901003°N 64.6326137°W

Edgetts Landing is an unincorporated community in Albert County, New Brunswick. The community is situated in Southeastern New Brunswick, to the south of Moncton.

== See also ==
- List of communities in New Brunswick
