= Turtle Creek, New Brunswick =

Community in New Brunswick, Canada

Coordinates: 45.963°N 64.886°W

Turtle Creek is a community Southwest of Riverview, in Albert County, New Brunswick. The community is named after the Turtle Creek and is located on Route 910.

== History ==
As of Summer 2011, traffic to Turtle Creek has increased due to the recent construction of wind turbines. In 1866 Turtle Creek was a farming community with approximately 35 families: Robert Mitton and Peter Jonah were mill owners here: in 1871 it had a population of 150: in 1898 Turtle Creek was a station on the Salisbury and Hillsborough Railway, and had 1 post office and a population of 100: formerly called Fourche à Crapaud by Acadian settlers.

== Turtle Creek Reservoir ==
The Turtle Creek Reservoir located in the community that services water to Metro Moncton.

== See also ==
- List of communities in New Brunswick
