= Cape Enrage =

Southern tip of Barn Marsh Island in Canada

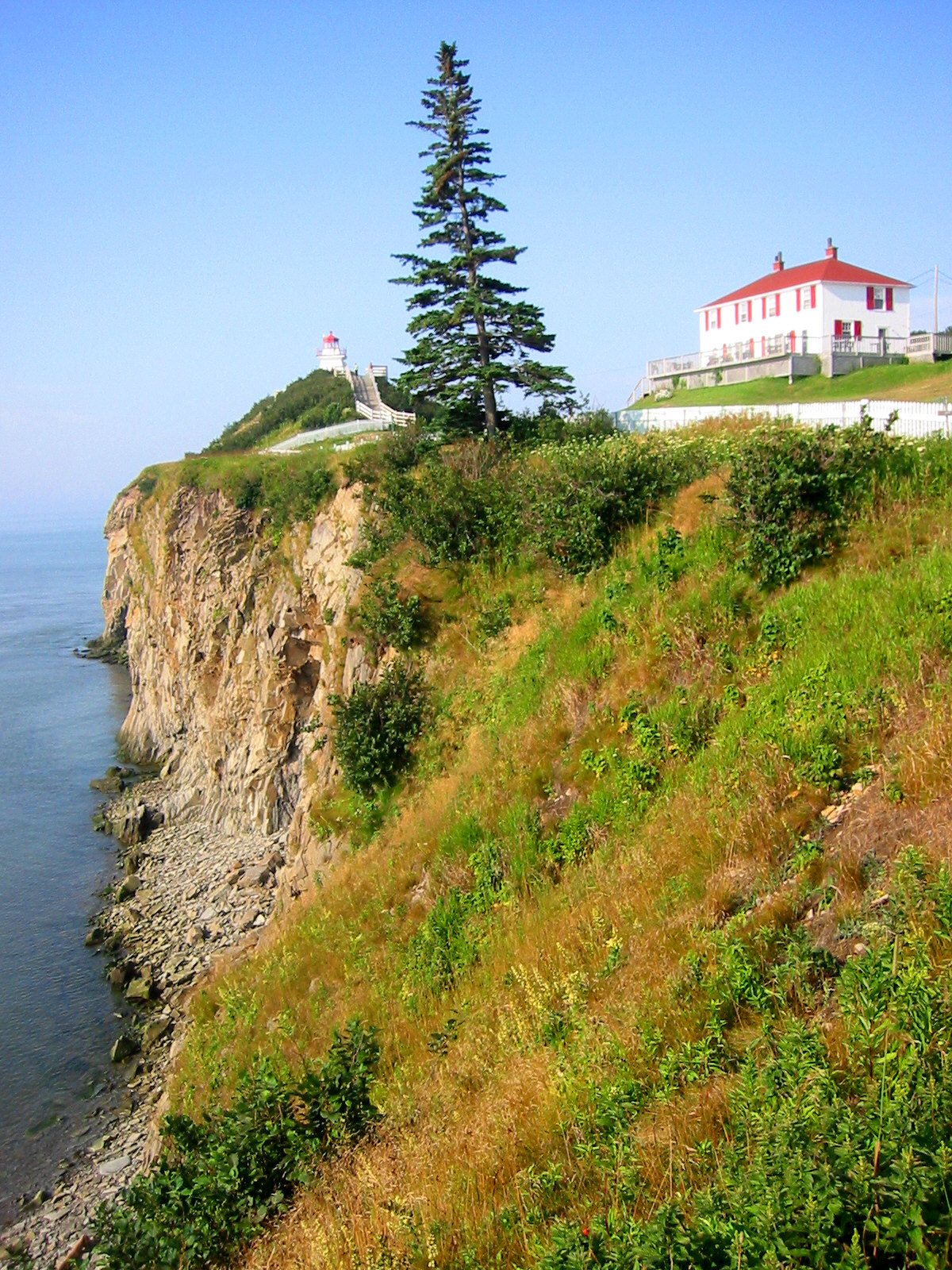
Cape Enrage lighthouse

Cape Enrage (pronounced as one word; KAY-pin-rayzh) is the name given to the southern tip of Barn Marsh Island, an island located in Albert County, New Brunswick, Canada, roughly half way along the coastline between the villages of Riverside-Albert and Alma at the eastern entrance to Fundy National Park.

Accessible from Route 915, the island itself is surrounded by jagged sea cliffs that are often more than 50 metres (145 ft) high, and is separated from the mainland by a narrow tidal creek.

Cape Enrage derives its name from the large reef that extends south into Chignecto Bay, which causes the water off the point to become extremely violent, particularly at half tide when the reef is partially exposed and the water is moving quickly.

In 2021, the Nature Trust of New Brunswick noted people had been illegally removing large quantities of smooth beach stone for landscaping and other projects.

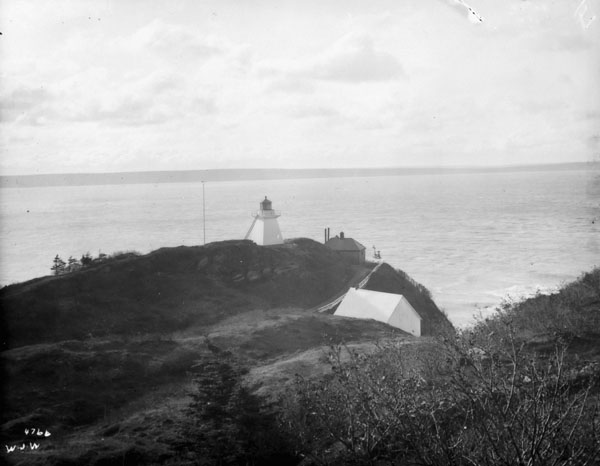
Lighthouse, Cape Enragé, New Brunswick, 1908
