= Turtle Creek (New Brunswick) =

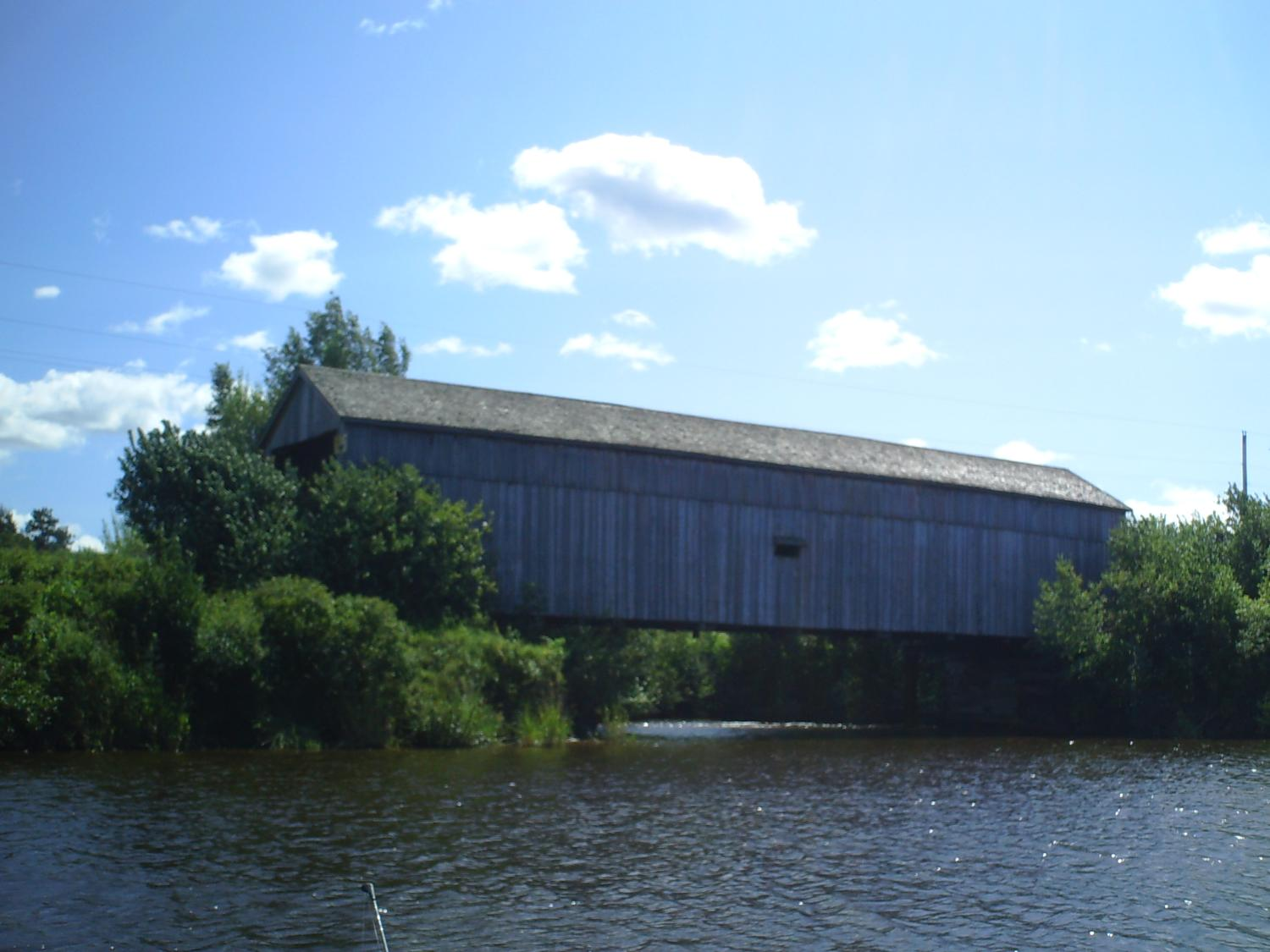

Location
- Country: Canada
- Province: New Brunswick
- County: Albert

Physical characteristics
- Mouth: Petitcodiac River
  - location: Riverview, New Brunswick
  - coordinates: 46°03′12″N 64°52′49″W
- Basin size: 192 km^{2} (74 sq mi)

Turtle Creek is a Canadian creek in Albert County, southeastern New Brunswick. The creek drains a watershed area of 192 square kilometres (74 square miles), and is the primary source of potable water for Moncton, Riverview, and Dieppe, thanks to the 150 km^{2} (58 sq mi) Turtle Creek reservoir and the Moncton Water Treatment Plant.

Turtle Creek is one of the Petitcodiac River's main right tributaries, and is therefore part of its 2,831 km^{2} (1,093 sq mi) drainage basin. Its watershed has been designated as a Provincial Watershed Protected Area, making certain activities off-limits within 75 metres (246 feet) of the reservoir.

The reservoir was the subject of a major upgrade completed in 2012 which doubled its existing water storage capacity. It has also been the centre of controversies regarding the province's push to begin uranium exploration and gas and oil tests in the area, in spite of the boundaries set on the surroundings.

== Watershed ==
The river drains a watershed area of 192 km^{2} (74 sq mi) south of the town of Riverview. The watershed is largely occupied by the Turtle Creek reservoir, which occupies around 170 km^{2} (66 sq mi) of land. Approximately 75% of the land is forested, with about 10% used for residential purposes. The average water temperature, noted in a 2009 study by the Petitcodiac Watershed Alliance, was 13.24 °C (55.83 °F), from May to October. The Turtle Creek reservoir is designated as a Provincial Watershed Protected Area, making certain activities illegal within 75 km (47 mi) of the area.

== Water quality ==
Covered under the Watershed Protected Area Designation Order and the Clean Water Act, Turtle Creek is rated, among thirty others, as a Class AP watershed. In spite of this rating, E. coli and sediment levels were found to be "unusually high", which, according to the Petitcodiac Watershed Alliance, was caused by the ongoing expansion of the river's reservoir. Nitrate, phosphate, and conductivity levels, according to the same report, remained consistent.

The city of Moncton conducts studies on over 1,600 water samples in 60 sites yearly to assure water drinking quality standards are met. According to an annual report published by the city in 2009, coliform bacteria, which include E. coli, were not found in any of 1,663 samples. In the same report, 63 of 576 (10.94%) water samples returned a heterotrophic plate count—an indicator of the "general bacteria population" present—of over 10 cfu/mL, but never exceeded the 500 cfu/mL threshold. Other results recorded an average turbidity of 0.15 NTU (Nephelometric Turbidity Units), and an average of 0.029 mg/L of trihalomethanes (THMs).

== See also ==
- List of rivers of New Brunswick
