= Lower Coverdale, New Brunswick =

Community in New Brunswick, Canada

Coordinates: 46.040°N 64.722°W

Location of Lower Coverdale in New Brunswick

Lower Coverdale is a settlement in Albert County, New Brunswick, Canada. It is located near Riverview, Moncton, and Dieppe.

== Education ==
- Riverview Middle School (buses carry students from Lower Coverdale to Riverview)
- Riverview High School (buses carry students from Lower Coverdale to Riverview)

== History ==
Located on W side of the Petitcodiac River, 6.7 km ESE of Upper Coverdale: Coverdale Parish, Albert County: PO 1847-1918 was located at the mouth of Turtle Creek: in 1866 Coverdale was a farming community with about 30 families: John Leeman, Edward Price and R.P. Scutell operated mills here: in 1871 Coverdale had a population of 250: in 1973 Coverdale was incorporated as a town and was amalgamated with Riverview Heights, Gunningsville and Bridgedale: renamed Riverview in 1974.

== See also ==
- List of communities in New Brunswick
- Greater Moncton
