= Shepody Bay =

Tidal embayment in New Brunswick, Canada

- Interactive map of Shepody Bay
- Coordinates: 45°48′N 64°33′W
- Area: 122 km^{2} (47 sq mi)

Ramsar Wetland
- Designated: 27 May 1987
- Reference no.: 363

Shepody Bay (French: Baie de Chipoudy) is a tidal embayment, an extension of the Bay of Fundy in New Brunswick, Canada, which consists of 77 square kilometres (30 mi^{2}) of open water and 40 km^{2} (15 mi^{2}) of mudflats, with 4 km^{2} (1.5 mi^{2}) of saline marsh on the west, and eroding sand and gravel beaches covering an area of approximately 1 km^{2} (0.39 mi^{2}) on the eastern shore. The intertidal mudflats "support internationally important numbers of the crustacean Corophium volutator, the principal food source for millions of fall migrating shorebirds".

The surrounding area of 122 km^{2} (47 mi^{2}) of coastal wetland was designated a Ramsar wetland of international importance on May 27, 1987, is a globally significant Important Bird Area, and is part of the Western Hemisphere Shorebird Reserve Network.

It is located about 50 kilometres (31 mi) south of Moncton. The nearest population centre is Riverside-Albert with a population of about 320. The Trans Canada Trail passes across part of Shepody Marsh.

Major streams feeding into the bay are the Shepody River, Petitcodiac River and Memramcook River. These three rivers gave the area its name under Acadian occupation in the seventeenth and eighteenth century, Trois Rivieres.

== See also ==
Notable landforms and features nearby:

- Cape Enrage
- Hopewell Rocks
- Mary's Point
- Maringouin Peninsula
- Grindstone Island
