= New Brunswick Route 112 =

Highway in New Brunswick, Canada

Route 112

Route information
- Maintained by New Brunswick Department of Transportation
- Length: 88.85 km (55.21 mi)
- Existed: 1965–present

Major junctions
- East end: Route 114 in Riverview
- Route 106 in Salisbury; Route 2 (TCH) in Salisbury
- West end: Route 10 / Route 715 in Coles Island

Location
- Country: Canada
- Province: New Brunswick
- Major cities: Salisbury, Canaan Forks

Highway system
- Provincial highways in New Brunswick; Former routes
← Route 111	→ Route 113

Route 112 is a highway in New Brunswick, Canada; running from Route 114 at the south end of the Petitcodiac River Causeway in Riverview, to an intersection with Route 10 at Coles Island. The route is 88.8 kilometres long.

From Riverview, Route 112 uses the Coverdale Road along the south bank of the Petitcodiac River, passing through Middle Coverdale, Upper Coverdale, and Five Points before crossing the river at Salisbury. The route then follows the Old Fredericton Road, running due west to a junction with Route 885 at New Canaan. Route 112 crosses the Canaan River and then follows its west bank in a southwesterly direction to the road's end at Coles Island.

Between Coles Island and Salisbury, where Route 112 intersects the Trans-Canada Highway, Route 112 was a popular shortcut for travellers between the Fredericton and Moncton areas. In the Fredericton area, it was colloquially referred to as the "Coles Island Road". However, with the opening of the upgraded four-lane Trans-Canada Highway in 2001, Route 112's importance as a trans-provincial highway link has diminished. The road is not open to through truck traffic.

== See also ==
- List of New Brunswick provincial highways
