= Beaver Brook, New Brunswick =

Coordinates: 45.6988445°N 64.790882°W

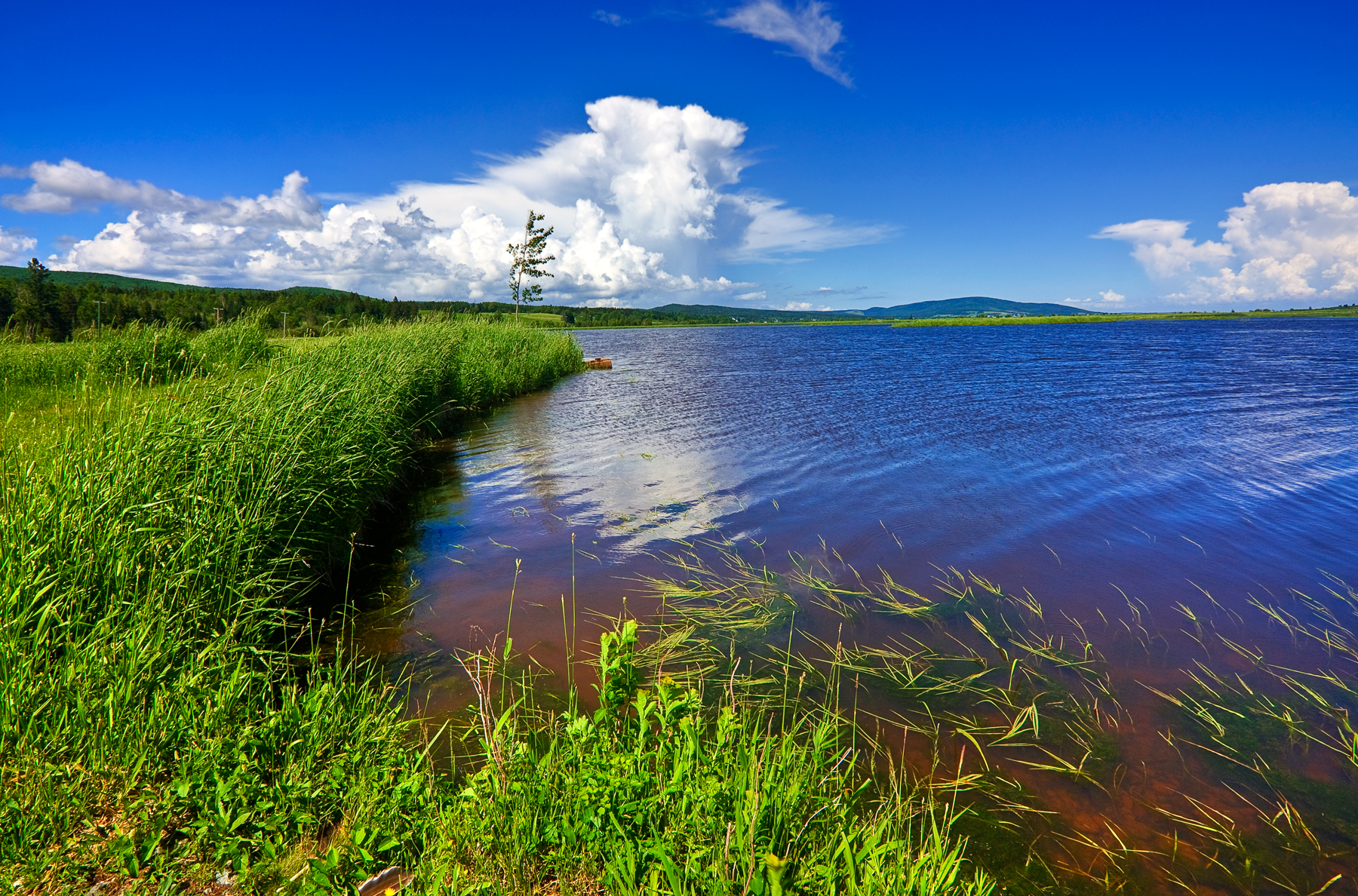
Beaver Brook

Beaver Brook is a Canadian rural community in Albert County, New Brunswick.

== See also ==
- List of communities in New Brunswick
