= New Brunswick Route 915 =

Highway in New Brunswick

Route 915
- Scenic Drive

Route information
- Maintained by New Brunswick Department of Transportation
- Length: 30.6 km (19.0 mi)

Major junctions
- West end: Route 114 in Alma
- East end: Route 114 in Riverside-Albert

Location
- Country: Canada
- Province: New Brunswick
- Counties: Albert

Highway system
- Provincial highways in New Brunswick; Former routes
← Route 910	→ Route 925

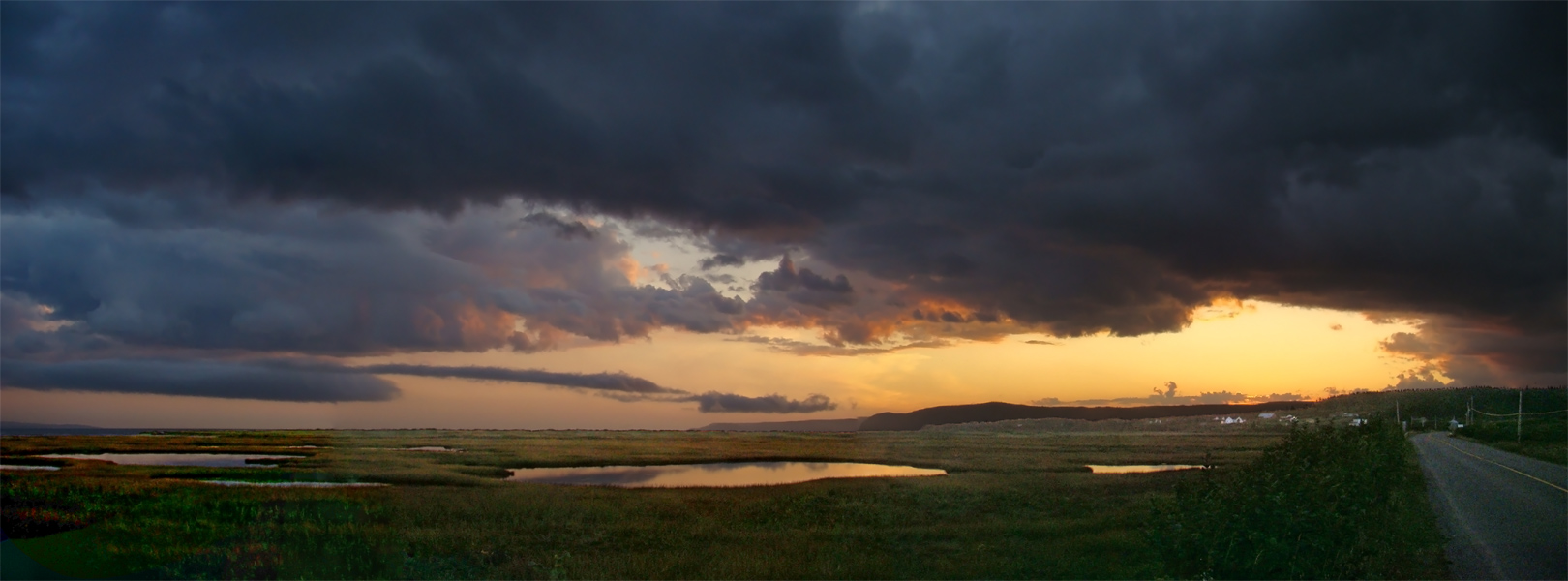
Sunset as seen from Route 915

Route 915 is a 30.6-kilometre (19.0 mi) long provincial highway located entirely in Albert County, New Brunswick, Canada. The highway begins at Route 114 in Alma and travels along the northwestern shores of the Bay of Fundy before turning back north to end at Route 114 in south Riverside-Albert.

== Route description ==
Route 915 begins at a y intersection with Route 114 in Alma, along a roadway named Scenic Drive. The route travels northwest through woodlands before approaching the community of Waterside. The highway sits on the near the tidal flats of the Bay of Fundy until it reaches Cape Enrage, where it turns further inland. The highway continues through several small villages along the bay before turning north before crossing over a small creek that flows into the bay, terminating again at Route 114 south of Riverside-Albert.

== Major intersections ==
The entire route is in Albert County.

Location	km	mi	Destinations	Notes
Alma	0.0	0.0	Route 114 (Main Street)	Western terminus
Riverside-Albert	30.6	49.2	Route 114 (Main Street)	Eastern terminus
1.000 mi = 1.609 km; 1.000 km = 0.621 mi
