= Area codes 506 and 428 =

Telephone area code for New Brunswick, Canada

Coordinates: 46.516°N 66.284°W

Area codes 506 and 428 are the telephone area codes in the North American Numbering Plan (NANP) for the Canadian province of New Brunswick. Area code 506 was created in 1955 in a split of numbering plan area (NPA) 902. Area code 428 was added to the same numbering plan area in 2023 to form an overlay plan of the area.

== History ==
The Maritimes provinces (New Brunswick, Nova Scotia, Prince Edward Island) were designated as a single numbering plan area (NPA) in 1947, when the American Telephone and Telegraph Company (AT&T) published the results of the design of a new telephone numbering plan for the North American continent, that unified all existing local numbering system into what would later develop into the North American Numbering Plan, with the goal of automating the expanding toll call routing that involved many telephone operators manually relaying calls across the nations. Of the set of eighty-six original North American area codes, Canada received nine, in which the Maritimes were represented by area code 902.

After the addition of Newfoundland and Labrador in 1949, New Brunswick and Newfoundland were split off from the numbering plan area in 1955 with area code 506. This configuration existed only until 1962, when Newfoundland was assigned area code 709, leaving New Brunswick as a distinct numbering plan area, with area code 506. Since this persists until today without any overlay code, seven-digit dialing remained possible in these numbering plan areas: 709, 807, and 867 in Canada, until mid-2023.

Area code 506 was expected to face numbering exhaustion in 2020, and was to be overlaid with area code 428, beginning November 21, 2020, with permissive ten-digit dialing to start in May 2020. Later, the projected exhaust date was delayed to April 2023 and the implementation date was postponed to April 23, 2022. However, the projected exhaust date was delayed to December 2023 and the implementation became mandatory on April 29, 2023, at midnight.

The incumbent local exchange carrier for area code 506 is Bell Aliant, which was produced from a merger that included NBTel. Since 2005, local telephone service through Eastlink Communications has also been available in the town of Sackville.

== Rate centres and central offices ==
Map of Canada with New Brunswick highlighted

- Premium numbers: (1-428/506) - 976
- Albert: (506) - 571 882
- Allardville: (506) - 583 725
- Alma: (506) - 282 572 887
- Arcadia: (506) - 488
- Baie-Sainte-Anne: (506) - 228 595
- Baker Brook: (506) - 258 822
- Balmoral: (506) - 509 826
- Bathurst: (428) - 496 580; (506) - 226 252 254 255 265 350 416 480 496 498 499 500 513 527 543 544 545 546 547 548 549 621 655 828 881 984 989
- Belledune: (506) - 237 507 520 522
- Blacks Harbour: (506) - 456 816
- Boiestown: (506) - 369 868
- Bouctouche: (428) - 436; (506) - 291 341 436 492 700 743 744 926 955
- Browns Flat: (506) - 468 571 771
- Campbellton: (506) - 248 329 409 584 615 701 753 759 760 787 789 790 809 929 987
- Campobello Island: (506) - 752
- Cap-Pelé: (506) - 332 493 577 885
- Caraquet: (506) - 201 296 602 616 617 702 720 724 726 727 997
- Champdoré: (506) - 281 342 525 564
- Chipman: (506) - 339 418 820
- Clair: (506) - 401 821 992
- Cocagne: (506) - 322 345 494 576
- Dalhousie: (506) - 239 508 684 685 686 706 905 907
- Deer Island: (506) - 747
- Doaktown: (506) - 225 309 361 365 510 680 906 924 970 972 990
- Dorchester: (506) - 213 224 379 528 722 966
- Edmundston: (506) - 200 223 253 254 287 305 306 315 353 419 501 514 641 733 735 736 737 739 740 838 880 933 986 996
- Florenceville: (506) - 221 245 246 276 278 391 392 595 671 703 903 908 928 974
- Fords Mills: (506) - 785
- Fredericton: (506) - 206 230 238 247 259 260 261 262 267 282 289 292 300 304 320 371 405 406 415 429 440 442 443 444 447 449 450 451 452 453 454 455 457 458 459 460 461 462 470 471 472 474 476 478 515 516 606 668 681 695 883 897 981 998 999
- Fredericton Junction: (506) - 348 368
- Fundy-St. Martins: (506) - 833
- Gagetown: (506) - 438 488
- Grand Bay–Westfield: (506) - 217 270 403 738 757
- Grand Falls: (506) - 240 293 426 473 475 477 479 481 582 704 831 901 909 995
- Grand Manan: (506) - 398 660 661 662
- Grande-Anse: (506) - 604 732
- Hampton: (506) - 376 832 943
- Hartland: (506) - 375 596
- Harvey: (428) - 526; (506) - 347 366 370 439 526 705
- Hautes-Terres: (506) - 358 598 603 764
- Hillsborough: (506) - 203 551 573 734
- Hoyt: (506) - 687
- Kedgwick: (506) - 283 284 505
- Keswick Ridge: (506) - 209 316 363
- Lakeland Ridges: (506) - 272 279 812 894
- Lamèque: (506) - 344 599
- Maces Bay: (506) - 410 659
- McAdam: (506) - 483 590 784
- Memramcook: (506) - 299 334 535 758
- Minto: (506) - 326 327 489 817
- Miramichi: (428) - 308 999; (506) - 210 251 264 352 354 417 424 502 517 539 556 565 622 623 624 625 626 627 691 773 778 780 836 971 983 985 993
- Miramichi River Valley: (506) - 586 843
- Moncton: (428) - 880 888; (506) - 204 227 229 232 233 268 269 294 295 314 377 378 380 381 382 383 384 386 387 388 389 407 414 431 441 448 482 484 518 588 675 688 777 796 797 800 801 802 803 804 805 806 807 830 850 851 852 853 854 855 856 857 858 859 860 861 862 863 864 866 867 869 870 871 872 874 875 877 878 889 893 899 951 952 953 961 962 973 980 988
- Nackawic-Millville: (506) - 463 490 575 818
- Nashwaak: (506) - 367 569 772
- Neguac: (506) - 220 330 554 776 779 969
- New Denmark: (506) - 553 825
- Nouvelle-Arcadie: (506) - 346 775
- Oromocto: (506) - 208 357 385 422 446 491 975
- Paquetville: (506) - 603 764
- Perth-Andover: (428) - 707; (506) - 273 274 280 707 819
- Petit-Rocher: (506) - 430 542 783
- Petitcodiac: (428) - 789; (506) - 331 402 534 559 708 750 751 756 788
- Richibucto: (428) - 404; (506) - 212 244 338 404 427 521 523 524 561 673 709 920
- Riverside-Albert: (506) - 882
- Rothesay: (506) - 216 319 847 848 849
- Sackville: (428) - 710; (506) - 256 360 364 536 540 562 710 939 940
- Saint-Basile: (506) - 263 580
- Saint-Léonard: (506) - 390 421 423 824
- Saint-Louis-de-Kent: (506) - 335 578 876
- Saint-Quentin: (506) - 234 235 241 400 504
- Sainte-Anne-de-Madawaska: (506) - 445 823
- Saint John: (428) - 201 910; (506) - 202 214 231 266 271 285 288 298 313 318 333 343 349 420 464 519 552 557 558 565 566 592 605 607 608 609 631 632 633 634 635 636 637 638 639 640 642 643 644 645 646 647 648 649 650 651 652 653 654 657 658 659 663 665 672 674 692 693 694 696 717 719 721 741 742 745 770 798 799 842 844 845 846 886 898 910 948 977 978 982
- Salisbury: (506) - 215 372 585
- Shediac: (428) - 723 724; (506) - 236 312 351 495 530 531 532 533 563 712 723 922
- Shippagan: (428) - 699; (506) - 218 242 275 336 337 340 593 601 699 715 925
- Springfield, Kings County: (506) - 413 485
- St. Andrews: (506) - 408 529 656 814
- St. George: (428) - 712 713; (506) - 222 374 396 713 754 755 815 923
- St. Stephen: (428) - 208 714; (506) - 249 321 373 465 466 467 469 573 714 813 921 927
- Strait Shores: (506) - 205 538 550 574
- Summerville (Kingston Peninsula): (506) - 763
- Sussex: (506) - 264 432 433 434 435 512 567 560 677 795 808 944 979 994
- Three Rivers: (506) - 331 534 708 750 751 756
- Tobique Valley: (506) - 219 355 356 359 968
- Tracadie: (506) - 250 297 393 394 395 397 399 579 600 716 718 748 749 888 890
- Valley Waters: (506) - 570 839
- Welsford: (506) - 486
- Woodstock: (428) - 300; (506) - 243 277 323 324 325 328 425 497 503 516 541 594 612 628 991
- Youngs Cove: (506) - 362

== See also ==
- Telephone numbers in Canada
- Canadian Numbering Administration Consortium

New Brunswick area codes: 506/428
	North: 367/418/581	
West: 207, 367/418/581	428/506	East: 902/782
	South: 902/782	
Nova Scotia and Prince Edward Island area codes: 782/902
Quebec area codes: 367/418/581, 354/450/579, 263/438/514, 468/819/873
Maine area codes: 207
Newfoundland and Labrador area codes: 709/879
