= Coverdale, New Brunswick =

Community in New Brunswick, Canada

Coordinates: 46.0461805°N 64.960298°W

Coverdale is an unincorporated community in Coverdale Parish, Albert County, New Brunswick. The community is situated in Southeastern New Brunswick, to the south of Moncton.

== See also ==
- List of communities in New Brunswick
