= Weldon, New Brunswick =

Unincorporated community in New Brunswick, Canada

Coordinates: 45.9467045°N 64.67309°W

Weldon is an unincorporated community in Albert County, New Brunswick. The community is situated in Southeastern New Brunswick, to the south of Moncton.

== See also ==
- List of communities in New Brunswick
