= Albert County, New Brunswick =

County in New Brunswick, Canada

Albert County
- County
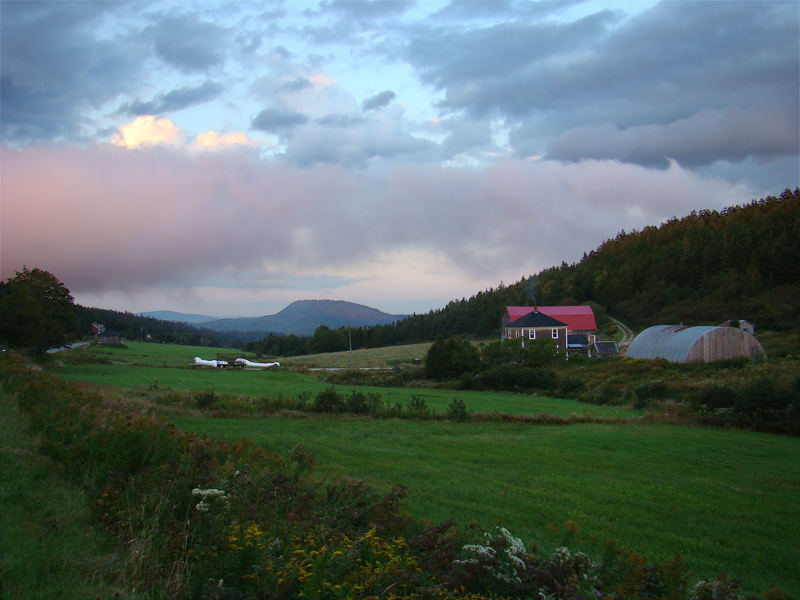
- Farm landscape near Alma

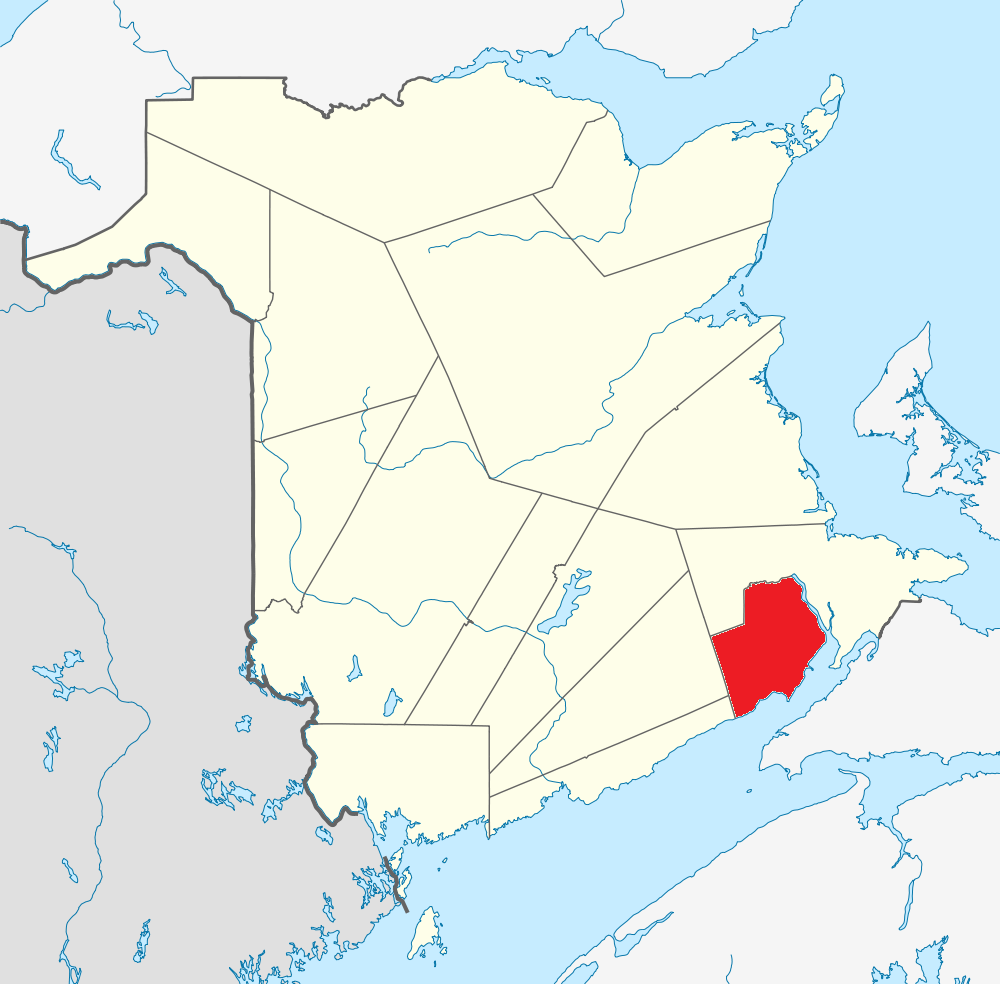
- Location within New Brunswick
- Coordinates: 45.82°N 64.85°W
- Country: Canada
- Province: New Brunswick
- Established: 1845

Area
  - Land: 1,806.23 km^{2} (697.39 sq mi)

Population (2021)
  - Total: 30,749
  - Density: 17/km^{2} (44/sq mi)
  - Pop 2016-2021: ▲5.5%
  - Dwellings: 13,476
- Time zone: UTC-4 (AST)
  - Summer (DST): UTC-3 (ADT)
- Area code: 506

Albert County (2021 population 30,749) is New Brunswick's third-youngest county, located on the Western side of the Petitcodiac River on the Chignecto Bay in the Bay of Fundy; the shire town is Hopewell Cape. The county was established in 1845 from parts of Westmorland County and Saint John County, and named after Prince Albert. Since the abolition of county municipal governments in 1967, its best-known use is as a census division.

The mineral albertite was discovered a few miles away in 1849, giving rise to Albert Mines.

== Census subdivisions ==
=== Municipalities ===
There are four municipalities within Albert County (listed by 2021 population):

| Official name | Status | Area km^{2} | Population | Parish |
|---|---|---|---|---|
| Riverview | Town | 34.10 | 20,584 | Coverdale |
| Hillsborough | Village | 12.81 | 1,348 | Hillsborough |
| Riverside-Albert | Village | 3.39 | 348 | Hopewell |
| Alma | Village | 47.64 | 282 | Alma |

=== Parishes ===
The county's six parishes serve as rural census subdivisions, which do not include the municipalities within them (listed by 2021 population):

| Official name | Area km^{2} | Population | municipalities | Unincorporated communities |
|---|---|---|---|---|
| Coverdale | 236.00 | 4,766 | Riverview (town) | Colpitts Settlement / Five Points / Grub Road / Lower Coverdale / Lower Turtle Creek / Middlesex / Middle Coverdale / Nixon / Pine Glen / Price / Salisbury Back Road / Stoney Creek / Synton / Turtle Creek / Upper Coverdale |
| Hillsborough | 304.03 | 1,397 | Hillsborough (village) | Albert Mines / Baltimore / Beech Hill / Berryton / Caledonia Mountain / Dawson Settlement / Edgetts Landing / Isaiah Corner / Osborne Corner / Rosevale / Salem / Shenstone / Steeves Mills / Steevescote / Weldon |
| Elgin | 519.54 | 1,064 | | Church Hill / Churchs Corner / Elgin / Ferndale / Forest Hill / Goshen / Gowland Mountain / Harrison Settlement / Hillside / Little River / Mapleton / Meadow / Midland / Parkindale / Pleasant Vale / Prosser Brook / Ross Corner |
| Hopewell | 149.14 | 597 | Riverside-Albert (village) | Cape Station / Chemical Road / Chester / Curryville / Demoiselle Creek / Hopewell Cape / Hopewell Hill / Lower Cape / McGinleys Corner / Memel Settlement / Mountville / Shepody |
| Harvey | 276.85 | 358 | | Beaver Brook / Brookville / Cape Enrage / Derrys Corner / Germantown / Harvey / Harvey Bank / Little Ridge / Midway / New Horton / New Ireland / Upper New Horton / Waterside / West River |
| Alma | 222.74 | 5 (Note: Population is rounded in census for privacy reasons.) | Alma (village) | Mitchells Corner / Teahans Corner |

== Demographics ==
Historical Census Data - Albert County, New Brunswick
| Year | Pop. | ±% |
|---|---|---|
| 1851 | 6,313 | — |
| 1861 | 9,444 | +49.6% |
| 1871 | 10,672 | +13.0% |
| 1881 | 12,329 | +15.5% |
| 1891 | 10,971 | −11.0% |
| 1901 | 10,925 | −0.4% |
| 1911 | 9,691 | −11.3% |
| 1921 | 8,607 | −11.2% |
| 1931 | 7,679 | −10.8% |
| 1941 | 8,421 | +9.7% |
| 1951 | 9,910 | +17.7% |
| 1956 | 10,943 | +10.4% |
| 1961 | 12,485 | +14.1% |
| 1966 | 13,944 | +11.7% |
| 1971 | 16,307 | +16.9% |
| 1976 | 22,159 | +35.9% |
| 1981 | 23,632 | +6.6% |
| 1986 | N/A | — |
| 1991 | 25,640 | — |
| 1996 | 26,492 | +3.3% |
| 2001 | 26,749 | +1.0% |
| 2006 | 27,562 | +3.0% |
| 2011 | 28,846 | +4.7% |
| 2016 | 29,158 | +1.1% |
| 2021 | 30,749 | +5.5% |

As a census division in the 2021 Census of Population conducted by Statistics Canada, Albert County had a population of 30,749 living in 12,913 of its 13,476 total private dwellings, a change of 5.5% from its 2016 population of 29,158. With a land area of 1,806.23 km^{2} (697.39 sq mi), it had a population density of 17.0/km^{2} (44.1/sq mi) in 2021.

Canada census – Albert community profile

| | 2021 | 2016 | 2011 |
| Population | 30,749 (+5.5% from 2016) | 29,158 (+1.1% from 2011) | 28,846 (+4.7% from 2006) |
| Land area | 1,806.23 km^{2} (697.39 sq mi) | 1,807.88 km^{2} (698.03 sq mi) | 1,806.54 km^{2} (697.51 sq mi) |
| Population density | 17/km^{2} (44/sq mi) | 16.1/km^{2} (42/sq mi) | 16.0/km^{2} (41/sq mi) |
| Median age | 46.0 (M: 44.8, F: 47.2) | 45.0 (M: 44.0, F: 46.0) | 42.9 (M: 41.8, F: 43.9) |
| Private dwellings | 13,476 (total) 12,913 (occupied) | 13,111 (total) | 12,573 (total) |
| Median household income | $77,500 | $66,521 | $60,952 |

References: 2021 2016 2011

=== Language ===
Canada Census Mother Tongue - Albert County, New Brunswick
| Census | Total | English | | | French | | | English & French | | | Non-official languages | | |
| Year | Responses | Count | Trend | Pop % | Count | Trend | Pop % | Count | Trend | Pop % | Count | Trend | Pop % |
| 2021 | 30,505 | 26,695 | ▲2.3% | 87.51% | 2,195 | ▲10.0% | 7.20% | 490 | ▲108.5% | 1.61% | 935 | ▲74.8% | 3.07% |
| 2016 | 28,930 | 26,105 | ▼0.2% | 90.24% | 1,995 | ▲8.1% | 6.90% | 235 | ▲17.5% | 0.81% | 535 | ▲30.5% | 1.85% |
| 2011 | 28,590 | 26,135 | ▲4.0% | 91.41% | 1,845 | ▲17.1% | 6.45% | 200 | ▲207.7% | 0.70% | 410 | ▼16.3% | 1.43% |
| 2006 | 27,260 | 25,130 | ▲2.0% | 92.19% | 1,575 | ▲9.4% | 5.78% | 65 | ▼43.5% | 0.24% | 490 | ▲78.2% | 1.80% |
| 2001 | 26,470 | 24,640 | ▼0.1% | 93.09% | 1,440 | ▲10.8% | 5.44% | 115 | ▲15.0% | 0.43% | 275 | ▲44.7% | 1.04% |
| 1996 | 26,255 | 24,665 | n/a | 93.94% | 1,300 | n/a | 4.95% | 100 | n/a | 0.38% | 190 | n/a | 0.72% |

== Access Routes ==
Highways and numbered routes that run through the county, including external routes that start or finish at the county limits:

- Highways
  - None
- Principal Routes
  - Route 112
  - Route 114
- Secondary Routes:
  - Route 895
  - Route 905
  - Route 910
  - Route 915
- External Routes:
  - None

== Protected areas and attractions ==
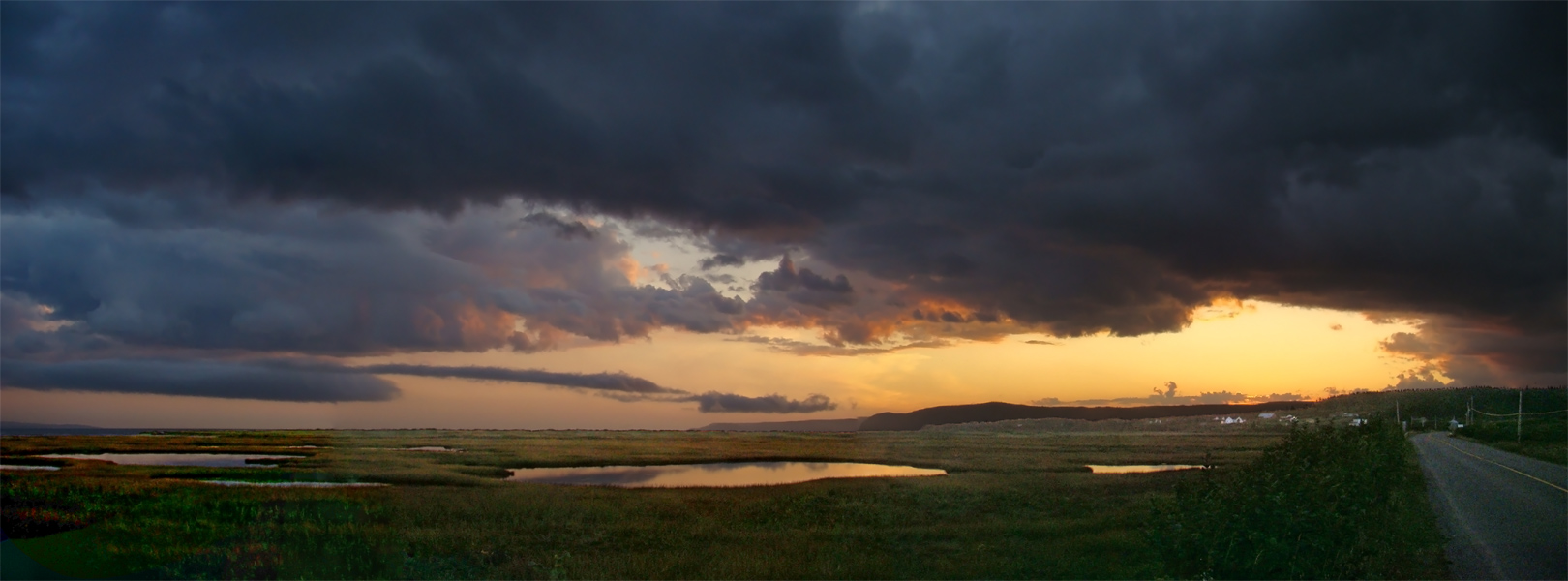
Sunset over the Bay of Fundy near Waterside

- Fundy National Park
  - Chignecto North
  - Headquarters
  - Point Wolfe
  - Visitors Centre
- Hopewell Rocks
- Shepody National Wildlife Area
- Wilson Brook Natural Protected Area
- Cape Enrage
- Albert County Museum

== See also ==
- List of communities in New Brunswick
- Royal eponyms in Canada
