= Salisbury, New Brunswick =

Salisbury
- Town
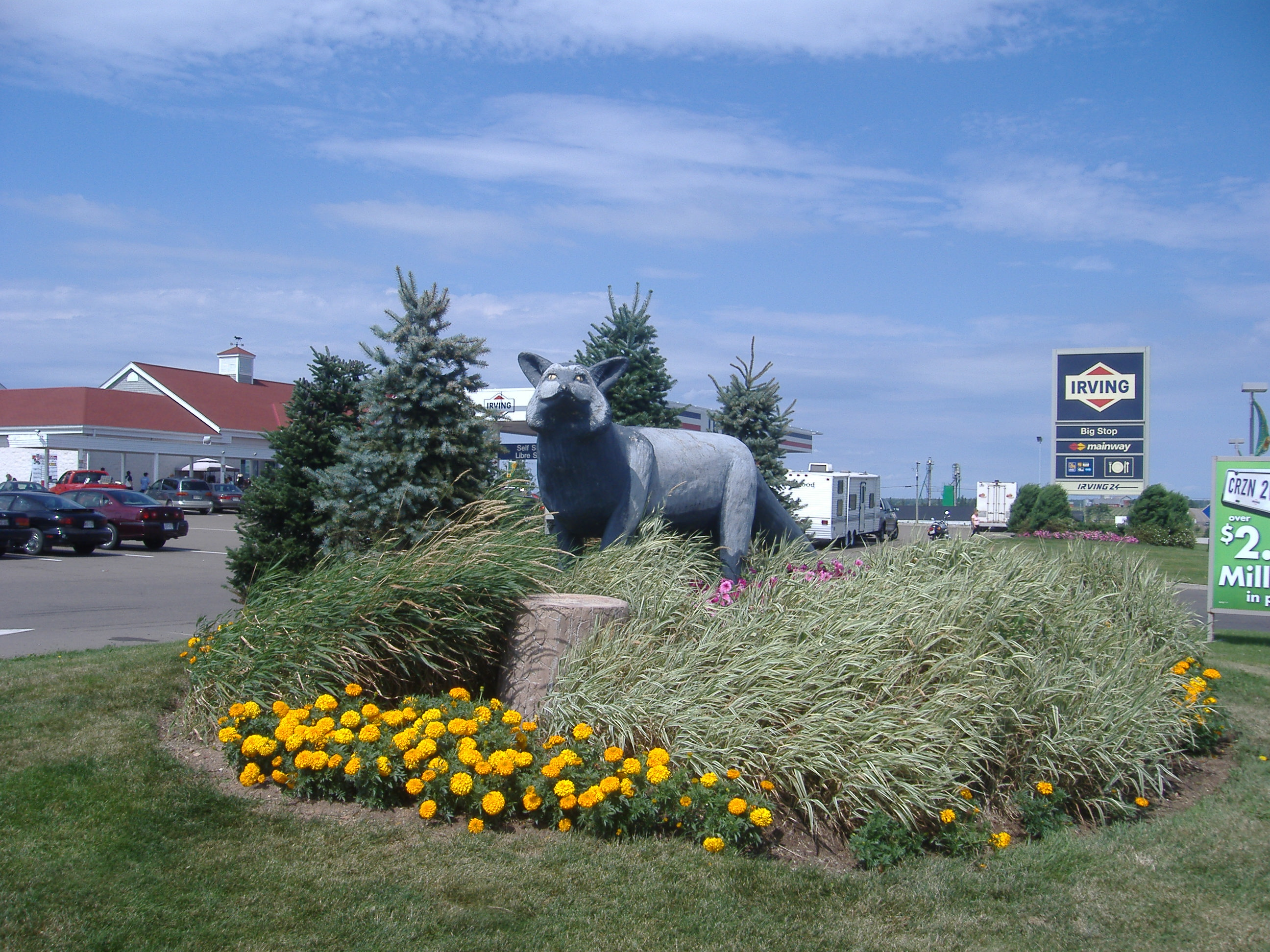
- The Silver Fox

- Flag
- Nickname: "Home of the Silver Fox"
- Location within New Brunswick
- Coordinates: 46.033333°N 65.05°W
- Country: Canada
- Province: New Brunswick
- County: Westmorland County
- Parish: Salisbury Parish
- Founded: 1782
- Incorporated Village: 1966
- Town: 2023
- Electoral Districts Federal: Fundy Royal
- Provincial: Petitcodiac

Government
  - Mayor: Rob Campbell
  - MLA: Mike Holland (PC)
  - MP: Rob Moore (CPC)

Area
  - Land: 13.56 km^{2} (5.24 sq mi)

Population (2021)
  - Total: 2,387
  - Density: 176.1/km^{2} (456/sq mi)
  - Change (2016–21): ▲4.5%
- Population of former village limits
- Time zone: UTC-4 (Atlantic (AST))
  - Summer (DST): UTC-3 (ADT)
- Canadian Postal code: E4J
- Area code(s): 506 & 428
- Telephone Exchange: 215 372
- Website: salisburynb.ca

Salisbury is a town located in Westmorland County, New Brunswick, Canada.

Previously a village for 57 years from 1966 to 2023, in January 2023 Salisbury was amalgamated with parts of four local service districts (including the rural community of River Glade) to become a new town with the same name.

== History ==
Salisbury first became a permanent settlement when settlers from Yorkshire, England, settled there in 1774 (History, Village of Salisbury Website).

It grew quickly as a fox farming community, a special mutation of fox with grey/white fur, which was imported, was commonly bred in the many fox farms in Salisbury. This is where the saying "Home of the Silver Fox" comes from. While no fox farms are known to operate locally some wild foxes now share these genes.

== Geography ==
Salisbury is situated on the north bank of the Petitcodiac River, approximately 25 km (16 mi) west of Moncton / Riverview, and 16 km (10 mi) east of Petitcodiac.

== Services ==
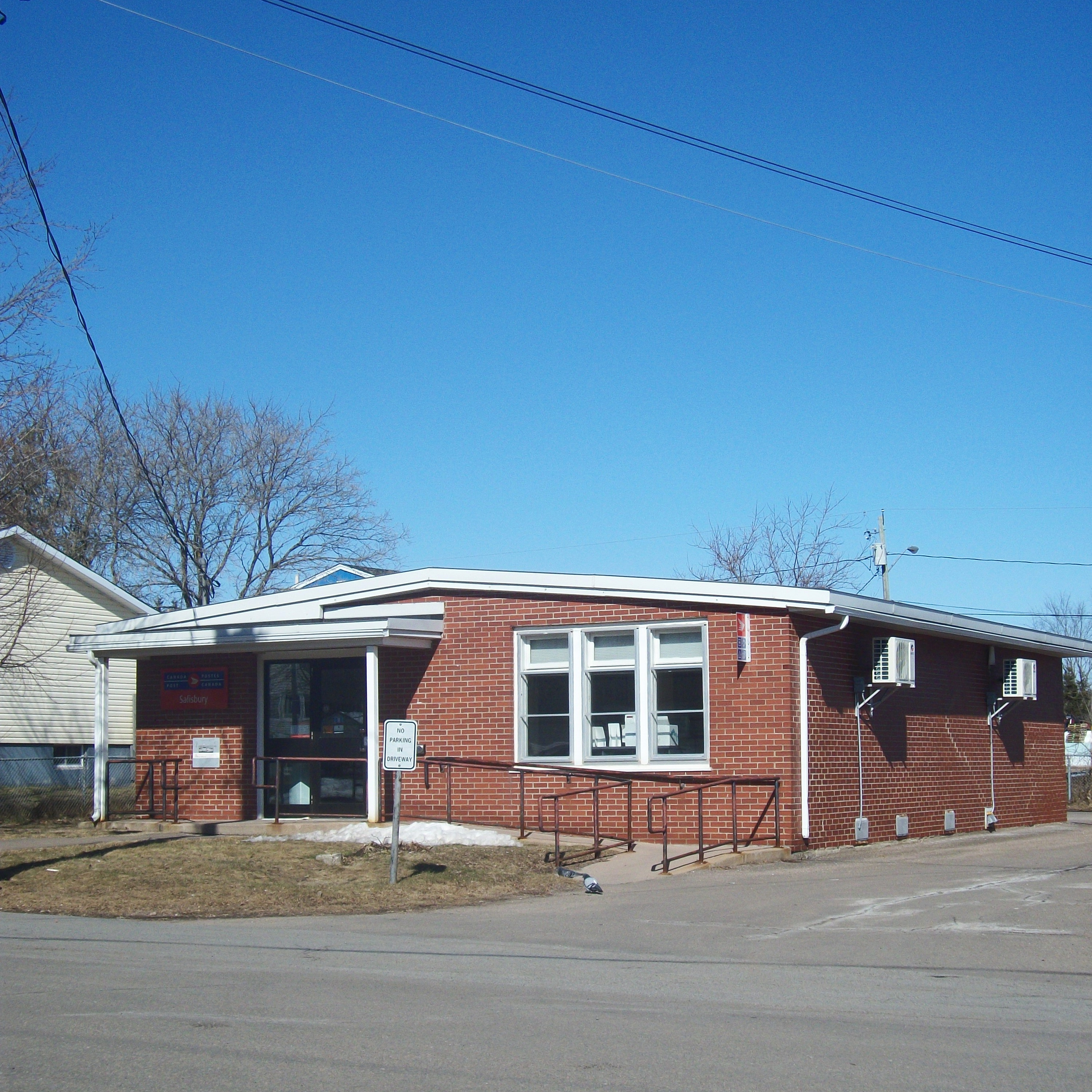
Salisbury post office.

The town has elementary, middle, and high schools and an outdoor swimming pool. Several family-owned shops and churches serve the surrounding area. There is also a Royal Canadian Air Cadet Squadron, 580 A/M Hugh Campbell Squadron.

Salisbury is a local service centre for several farming communities in the Petitcodiac River AKA Three Rivers, New Brunswick area. The town and many surrounding communities are served by Ambulance New Brunswick, Salisbury Fire & Rescue.

One of the first acts of the new council was to approve construction of a new fire hall.

== Demographics ==
In the 2021 Census of Population conducted by Statistics Canada, at this time the Village of Salisbury had a population of 2,387 living in 972 of its 996 total private dwellings, a change of 4.5% from its 2016 population of 2,284. With a land area of 13.56 km^{2} (5.24 sq mi), it had a population density of 176.0/km^{2} (455.9/sq mi) in 2021.

Population trend

Census	Population	Change (%)
2016	2,284	▲3.4%
2011	2,208	▲8.4%
2006	2,036	▲4.2%
2001	1,954	▲3.8%
1996	1,878	▲4.0%
1991	1,805	▲3.5%
1986	1,742	▲4.2%
1981	1,672	N/A

Income (2015)

Income type	By CAD
Median total income per capita	$29,536
Median Household Income	$58,478
Median Family Income	$69,461

Mother tongue (2016)

Language	Population	Pct (%)
English	2,095	92.5%
French	95	4.2%
Other languages	55	2.4%
English and French	20	0.9%

According to the 2022 Election Results a total of 327 citizens voted in the last Municipal election for the region.

Position	Official Representative	Votes Received	Total Voters
Mayor	Robert CAMPBELL	0	Accl.
Councillor at Large	Jason GALLANT	0	Accl.
Ward 1	John Wiebe DYKSTRA	85	181
Ward 2	Phyllis BANNISTER	0	Accl.
Ward 3 (Former Village)	Sarah COLWELL, Nathan O'BLENIS, & Stephanie THORNE	0	Accl. X 3
Ward 4	Joseph (Joe) D'ETTORE	94	146

== Education ==
- JMA Armstrong High School (9–12)
- Salisbury Middle School (5–8)
- Salisbury Elementary School (K–4)

== Notable people ==
- Hugh Campbell, former Canadian air marshal.
- Austin Claude Taylor, farmer, merchant and political figure.
- Claude Taylor, former Air Canada President
- Stacy Wilson, former women's hockey player.

== Bordering communities ==
- Boundary Creek, New Brunswick
- Gallagher Ridge, New Brunswick
- Price, New Brunswick
- Lewis Mountain, New Brunswick
- Moncton, New Brunswick
- Second North River, New Brunswick
- Kay Settlement
- Upper Coverdale
- Three Rivers, New Brunswick
- Middlesex, New Brunswick

== See also ==
- Greater Moncton
- List of communities in New Brunswick
