= Waterside, New Brunswick =

Coordinates: 45°37′47.5″N 64°49′52.3″W

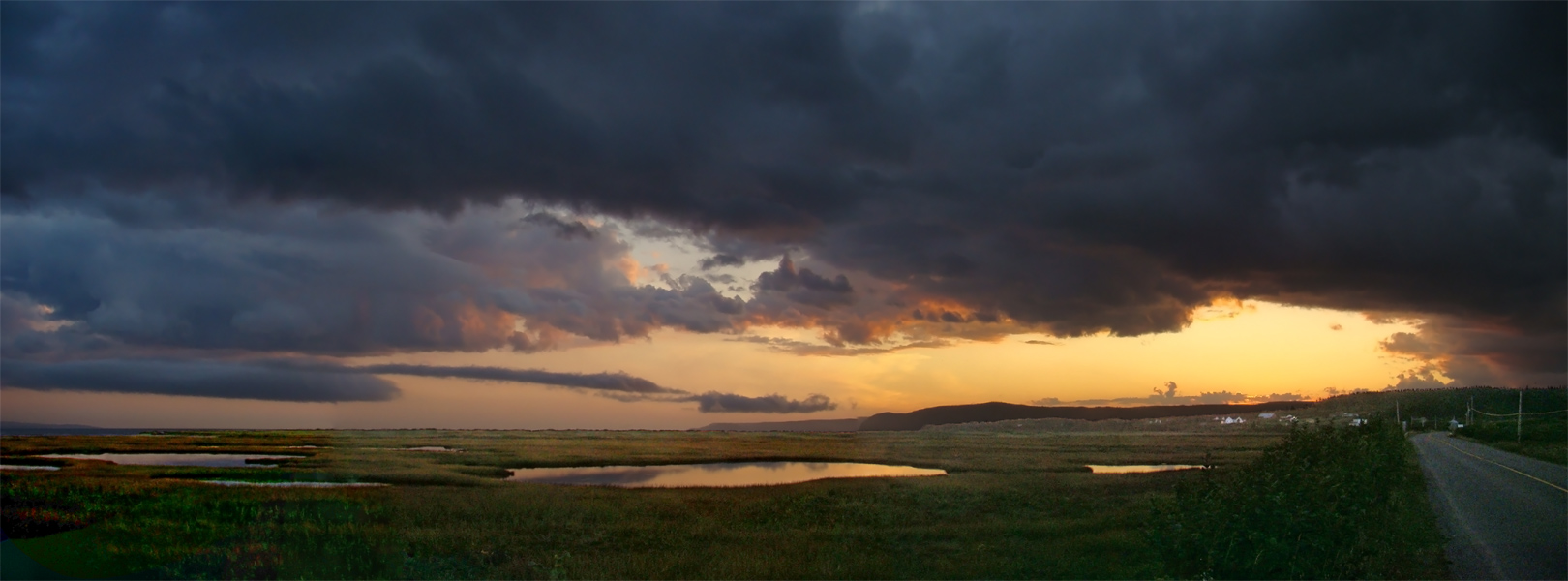
Waterside at sunset.

Waterside is a community just outside Alma, New Brunswick, Canada, located on the Bay of Fundy. It has a population of almost 100, with summer cottages along the shore. It is near Cape Enrage, a popular tourist destination and lighthouse. Additionally, Waterside is visited for its own Waterside Beach Park, featuring wide beaches, a variety of attractions, and picturesque scenery.

== See also ==
- List of communities in New Brunswick
