= Upper Coverdale, New Brunswick =

Coordinates: 46.046694°N 64.9704469°W

Upper Coverdale is an unincorporated community in Albert County, New Brunswick. The community is situated in Southeastern New Brunswick, to the south of Moncton.

== See also ==
- List of communities in New Brunswick
