= Stoney Creek, New Brunswick =

Community in New Brunswick, Canada

Coordinates: 45.9997°N 64.7160°W

Location of Stoney Creek in New Brunswick

Stoney Creek is a community in the Canadian province of New Brunswick. It is located near Riverview, Moncton, and Dieppe.

== Education ==
- Lower Coverdale Elementary School (K - 5)
- Riverview Middle School (buses carry students to Riverview)
- Riverview High School (buses carry students to Riverview)

== See also ==
- List of communities in New Brunswick
- Greater Moncton
