= Alma Parish =

Alma
- Parish
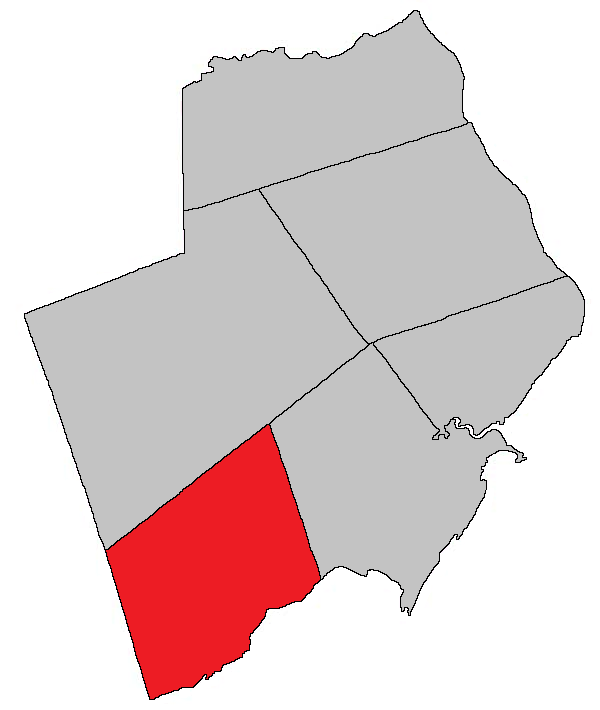
- Location within Albert County.
- Coordinates: 45.64°N 65.00°W
- Country: Canada
- Province: New Brunswick
- County: Albert County
- Erected: 1855

Area
  - Land: 222.74 km^{2} (86.00 sq mi)

Population (2021)
  - Total: 5
  - Density: 0/km^{2} (0/sq mi)
  - Change 2016-2021: Steady
  - Dwellings: 5
- Time zone: UTC-4 (AST)
  - Summer (DST): UTC-3 (ADT)
- Median Income*: $32,995 CDN
- Median household income, 2005 (all households) Figures do not include portion within the village of Alma

Alma is a geographic parish on the Bay of Fundy in the southwestern corner of Albert County, New Brunswick, Canada. (Note: The Territorial Division Act divides the province into 152 parishes, the cities of Saint John and Fredericton, and one town of Grand Falls. The Interpretation Act clarifies that parishes include any local government within their borders.)

For governance purposes, Alma is divided between the village of Fundy Albert and the Southeast rural district, both of which are members of the Southeast Regional Service Commission. A small area on the western side of Fundy National Park belongs to the Fundy rural district. (Note: Maps still visible as thumbnails show the current and previous governance boundaries.)

Prior to the 2023 governance reform, the parish was divided between the village of Alma and the local service district of the parish of Alma. Fundy National Park was de jure part of the LSD. The village and the park are now part of Fundy Albert, the LSD part of the rural district.

The census subdivision of the same name includes all of the parish except the village of Alma, which forms its own census subdivision. The population of the parish CSD is so small that census numbers are rounded to maintain privacy. Revised census figures based on the 2023 local governance reforms have not been released.

== Origin of name ==
The parish was named for its resemblance to the heights above the Alma River, site of the Battle of Alma, a decisive British/French/Turkish victory over Russia in 1854.

== History ==
Cumberland County, Nova Scotia included the territory now known as Alma Parish until the division of Nova Scotia and New Brunswick.

Initially modern Alma parish was split three ways. Saint Martins Parish in Saint John County extended eastward to the boundary of Hopewell Parish, (Note: This was probably near Owls Head rather than the modern boundary of Alma and Harvey Parish. William Francis Ganong's adaptation of the 1780 map of region by Joseph Frederick Wallet DesBarres shows the boundary approximately at Owls Head and a grant to Hambleton Redpath at Owls Head in 1831 gives the parish as Hopewell.) but ran only as far north as the extension of the northern line of Saint John County. The remainder of Alma was in Westmorland County, with Hopewell Parish extending north past Alma Parish's northern line, and the area north of Saint Martins Parish and west of Hopewell not assigned to any parish until Salisbury Parish was erected in 1787. This put the community of Alma in Saint Martins Parish, Hebron in Hopewell Parish, and Teahans Corner in Salisbury Parish.

The county line between Saint John County and Westmorland County shifted westward in 1837 and the orphaned part of Saint Martins Parish was added to Hopewell but not the area to its north. The next year the newly erected Harvey Parish included all of Alma.

== Boundaries ==
Alma Parish is bounded:

- on the north by a line beginning about 550 metres southeasterly of Wolfe Lake, then running north 72º east (Note: By the magnet of 1847, when declination in the area was between 19º and 20º west of north. The Territorial Division Act clause referring to magnetic direction bearings was later changed to the problematic wording "by the magnet of the year in which the County or Parish was erected", which ignores lines changed after the erection of the county or parish, before being omitted in the 1952 and 1973 Revised Statutes.) to the western line of Harvey Parish;
- on the east beginning at a point about 3 kilometres northeasterly of the junction of Red School House Road and Collier Mountain Road, on the prolongation of the eastern line of a grant to William Hoar, then running southerly along the prolongation and the grant to strike the shore of Rocher Bay about 1.1 kilometres southwest of the mouth of Alcorn Brook;
- on the south by Rocher Bay, Chignecto Bay, and the Bay of Fundy;
- on the west by the Saint John and Kings County lines;

== Municipality ==
The village of Alma contains all of the parish east of Fundy National Park and south of New Ireland Road.

== Local service district ==
The local service district of the parish of Alma legally contained all of the parish not in the village of Alma; in practice the national park is separate from the LSD.

The LSD was established on 1 November 1973 to assess for fire protection after the village of Alma was reduced in size from including in the entire parish. Ambulance service was added on 21 January 1976.

In 2020, the LSD assessed for community & recreation services in addition to the basic LSD services of fire protection, police services, land use planning, emergency measures, and dog control The taxing authority was 632.00 Alma.

=== National park ===
Fundy National Park is in the southwestern section of the parish, bounded on the north by Shepody Road and on east by Forty-Five Road, Lake Brook, and the Salmon River. It contains most of the parish and is under federal administration.

== Communities ==
Communities at least partly within the parish; bold indicates a municipality

- **Alma**
  - Hebron
- Teahans Corner

== Bodies of water ==
Bodies of water (Note: Not including brooks, ponds, or coves.) at least partly in the parish:

- Broad River
- Bay of Fundy
- Chignecto Bay
- Forty Five River
- Point Wolfe River
- Rocher Bay
- Upper Salmon River
- at least 13 named lakes

== Other notable places ==
Parks, historic sites, and other noteworthy places in the parish.

- Upper Salmon River Protected Natural Area

== Demographics ==
=== Population ===
Parish population total does not include the former incorporated village of Alma. Revised census figures based on the 2023 local governance reforms have not been released.

Canada census – Alma community profile

	2021	2011
Population	5 (+0.0% from 2016)	0 (-100.0% from 2006)
Land area	222.74 km^{2} (86.00 sq mi)	222.79 km^{2} (86.02 sq mi)
Population density	0/km^{2} (0/sq mi)	0.0/km^{2} (0/sq mi)
Median age	0.0 (M: , F: )	n/a (M: n/a, F: n/a)
Private dwellings	5 (total) 3 (occupied)	7 (total)
Median household income		$.N/A

Notes: Income & median age data for this area has been suppressed for data quality or confidentiality reasons.
References: 2021 2011

Historical Census Data - Alma Parish, New Brunswick

Year	Pop.	±%
1996	8	—
2001	5	−37.5%
2006	5	+0.0%

Year	Pop.	±%
2011	0	−100.0%
2016	5	—
2021	5	+0.0%

== Access routes ==
Highways and numbered routes that run through the parish, including external routes that start or finish at the parish limits:

- **Highways**
  - Route 114
- **Principal Routes**
  - None
- Secondary Routes:
  - Route 915
- External Routes:
  - None

== See also ==
- List of parishes in New Brunswick
