= Point Wolfe =

- Abandoned village
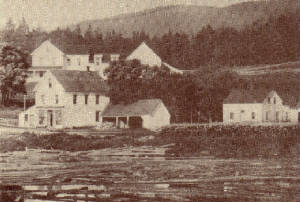
- Point Wolfe, c. 1915

- Location of Point Wolfe within New Brunswick
- Coordinates: 45°33′13″N 65°0′46″W
- Country: Canada
- Province: New Brunswick
- County: Albert
- Parish: Alma
- Named for: James Wolfe

Point Wolfe is a former Canadian village in Albert County, New Brunswick. It is currently a campground location at Fundy National Park.

== Geography ==
Point Wolfe was located in the Caledonian Hills, at the mouth of the Point Wolfe River in Chignectou Bay.

== History ==
Point Wolfe was situated near the village of Alma, at the mouth of the Point Wolfe River, in Chignecto Bay. As a farming village, Point Wolfe was home to about 72 families in 1866 and had a populated of 150 people in 1871. The village was expropriated as part of development for the Fundy National Park, which it is now a campground of.

== See also ==
- Fundy National Park - the park in which Point Wolfe is now a part of
- Point Wolfe Bridge
