= Dobson Trail =

Canadian Hiking Trail

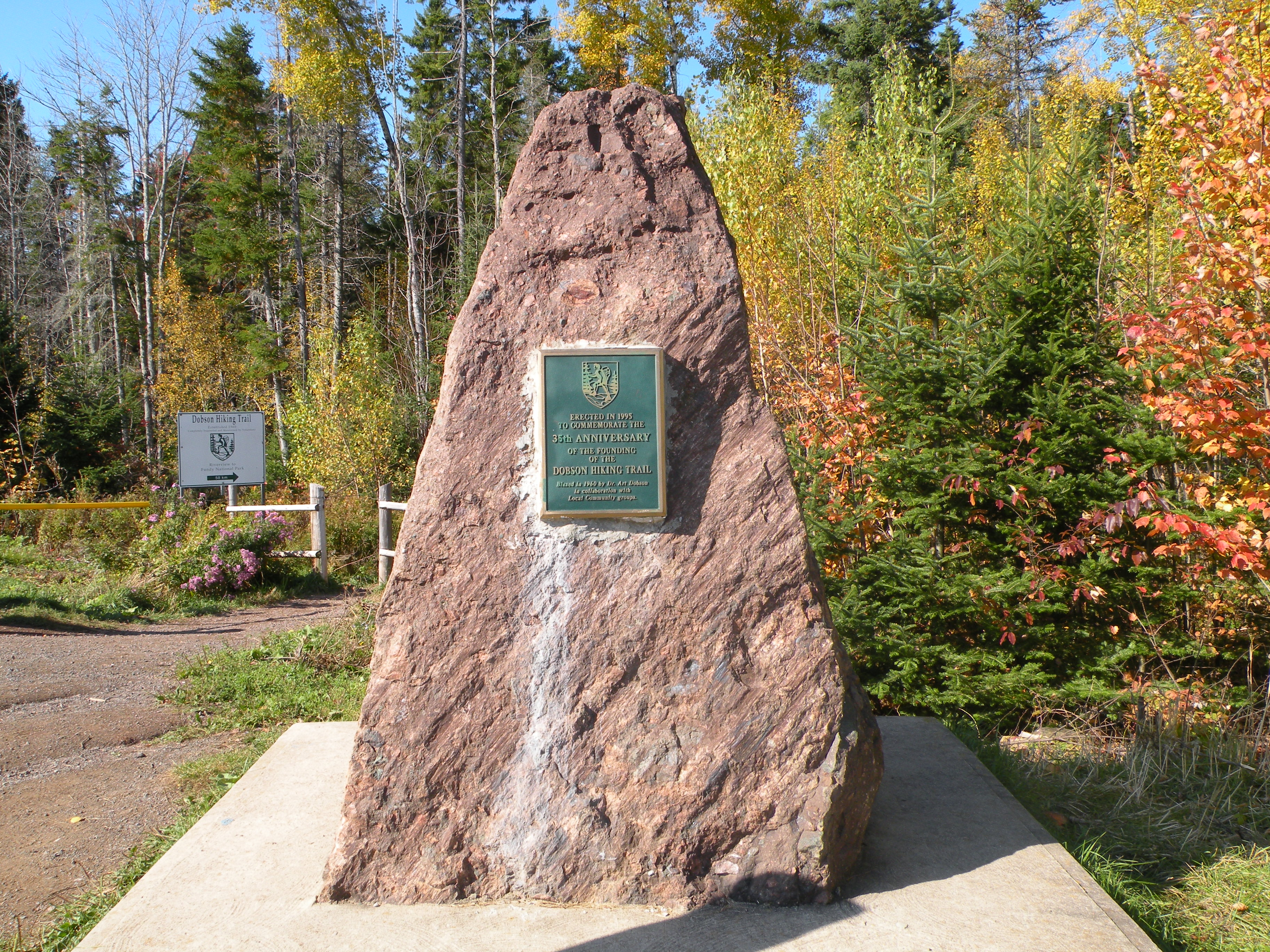
- Monument at the trailhead
- Length: 57.75 kilometres (35.88 mi)
- Location: Albert County, New Brunswick
- Designation: Trans Canada Trail
- Trailheads: Riverview, Fundy National Park
- Use: Hiking, Snowshoeing, Cross country skiing
- Difficulty: Moderate
- Season: Year-round
- Sights: Prosser Brook Ridge, Kent Hills Wind Farm, Hayward Pinnacle
- Hazards: Unleashed dogs
- Website: http://fundyhikingtrails.com

The Dobson Trail is a 57.75 km hiking trail that runs from Riverview, New Brunswick to Fundy National Park. The trail is named for Dr. Art Dobson, who started the initiative to build the trail in 1959. The trail is the longest volunteer-maintained trail in Eastern Canada.

== History ==
Dr. Art Dobson began scouting the trail in 1959, following the standards set out in a publication from the Appalachian Trail conference. Over a decade Scout troops from Hillsborough, Riverview, Moncton and Alma blazed the trail under Dobson's direction. The trail was originally referred to as "The Fundy Trail," after Fundy National Park, where the trail led. In the 1960s, the Province of New Brunswick established roadways known as the Fundy trails and Fundy National Park. In 1975 the name was changed to the Dobson Trail to avoid confusion with these other trails. The trail connects to the 33-kilometre Fundy Trail at Fundy National Park, which in turn connects to the Fundy Footpath.

== Sections ==
Section	Length
Pine Glen to Tower Road	14.69 km
Mill Creek Loop Trail	0.67 km
Sand Hill side Trail	1.2 km
Tower Road to East Turtle Creek culvert	2.01 km
East Turtle Creek culvert to Berryton	8.64 km
Berryton to Prosser Ridge	7.18 km
Prosser Ridge to Kent Road	9.21 km
Hayward Pinnacle Side Trail	2.3 km
Kent Road to Elgin-Fundy Road	10.1 km
Elgin-Fundy road to Old Shepody Road	5.93 km
