= List of covered bridges in New Brunswick =

Map

The Canadian province of New Brunswick has 56 covered bridges, according to the Government of New Brunswick. The Hartland Covered Bridge in Hartland is the world's longest covered bridge, spanning 1,282 feet (391 m). The most recent covered bridge constructed in New Brunswick is the Vaughan Creek Covered Bridge, which was reconstructed to add a second lane. The county with the most covered bridges is Kings County with 15, while Northumberland and Victoria counties both have one each. Additionally, both Restigouche and Gloucester counties have no covered bridges. Bridges are single span, unless noted.

== Existing bridges ==
Name	County	Location	Built	Length (m)	Truss type	Notes	Photo
Coverdale River No. 3 (Colpitts, Bramford)	Albert	Colpitts Road, near Salisbury; 45.988336°N 64.973774°W	1943	31	Burr variation	On Private Road	
Crooked Creek No. 3	Albert	Crooked Creek Road. 45.7970°N 64.7767°W	1945	28	Howe & Queen	Not in service. In the Caledonia Gorge Protected Natural Area.	
Tantramar River No. 2 (Wheaton)	Westmorland	High Marsh Road; 45.931726°N 64.330294°W	1916	51	Howe & Queen	The site until 1840 of a bridge on the post road, then called the Westmorland Great Road, the main route across the narrow Isthmus of Chignecto that connects Nova Scotia and New Brunswick.	
Benton or Eel River No. 3	York	Benton Road 45.9867°N 67.6083°W	1927	32			
Forty Five River No. 1	Albert	Forty-Five Road; 45.6870°N 64.9530°W	1914	29	Howe & Queen	Built by Alex Garland. In Fundy National Park. 17 ft roadway.	
Point Wolfe	Albert	Point Wolfe Road; 45.5507°N 65.0130°W	1992	29	Howe & Queen	In Fundy National Park. Replaces the original bridge which had been built in 1916 and lost in 1990.	
Sawmill Creek No. 0.5	Albert	Hopewell Hill; 45.7647°N 64.6925°W	1908	33		Not in service	
Turtle Creek No. 4 (Jonah, Peter)	Albert	Dewey Road 46.0029°N 64.9002°W	1912	20		Not in service. Moved in 2013 to dry land.	
Weldon Creek No. 3 (Steeves, Hartley)	Albert	Salem, near Hillsborough 45.9172°N 64.7010°W	1923	18	Howe & Queen	Built by John Forbes.	
Hartland	Carleton	Hartland 46.2967°N 67.5303°W	1901	391	Howe	Covered in 1921. National Historic Site and Provincial Historic Place. Longest covered bridge in the world. Seven spans.	
Florenceville	Carleton	Florenceville 46.4417°N 67.6213°W	1907	47	Howe	A five-span bridge of which one is covered and the others are steel.	
North Becaguimec River No. 4 (Ellis)	Carleton	Lower Windsor 46.3535°N 67.3868°W	1909	18	Howe & Queen		
Canal	Charlotte	Canal 45.1602°N 66.8273°W	1917	38	Howe & Queen		
Dennis Stream No. 3 (Maxwell Crossing)	Charlotte	Old Ridge 45.2448°N 67.2668°W	1910	18	Howe		
Digdeguash River (McGuire) No. 3 (McGuire)	Charlotte	Elmsville 46.0029°N 64.9002°W	1913	35			
Digdeguash River (McCann) No. 4 (McCann)	Charlotte	46.0029°N 64.9002°W	1938	86			
Digdeguash River (Dumbarton) No. 6 (Dumbarton)	Charlotte	Tyron Road 45.3785°N 67.1305°W	1928	76			
Little Lepreau River No. 1.5 (Mill Pond)	Charlotte	Little Lepreau 46.0029°N 64.9002°W	1910	32		Relocated next to new bridge. Accessible to walk through.	
Magaguadavic River No. 7 (Flume Ridge)	Charlotte	Flume Falls 45.4570°N 67.0162°W	1905	18	Modified Pratt & Queen		
Graham Creek	Kent	Route 510 46.60165211695204°N 64.94493520996093°W	1928	41			
Kouchibouguasis No. 5 (Camerons Mill)	Kent	Camerons Mill 46.676402012361514°N 65.13138628742217°W	1950	42			
Belleisle Creek No. 2 (Marven)	Kings	Swamp Road 45.68882°N 65.7718864°W	1903	22			
Bloomfield Creek	Kings	Bloomfield Station Road 45.577941753988036°N 65.75702763339996°W	1917	45			
Darlings Island	Kings	Darlings Island Road 45.478525427143445°N 65.89898622772216°W	1914	42		Not in service	
Kennebecasis River (Salmon)	Kings	Route 890 45.74308794556422°N 65.49876845619201°W	1908	34		Not in service	
Hammond River No. 3 (Smithtown)	Kings	Damascus Road 45.4637838°N 65.8051952°W	1914	56			
Kennebecasis River (Malone)	Kings	Goshen Road 45.759864702053044°N 65.21098888656616°W	1911	18			
Kennebecasis River (Plumweseep)	Kings	Plumweseep 45.7413934°N 65.44671446°W	1911	23		Named for the Maliseet word for Salmon River.	
Millstream River	Kings	Pleasant Ridge Branch Road	1911	29			
Milkish Inlet No. 1 (Bayswater)	Kings	Route 845 45.3396944116132°N 66.14535249015807°W	1920	67			
Smith Creek No. 1 (Tranton)	Kings	Roachville 45.743634523563344°N 65.50937927505493°W	1927	37			
Moosehorn Creek No. 1.5	Kings	Riverview Drive South 45.61632482188442°N 65.71559823295593°W	1915	29		Not in service	
Trout Creek No. 5 (Moores Mills)	Kings	Urney Road 45.682332055070916°N 65.37736631175994°W	1905	20			
Smith Creek No. 5 (Oldfields)	Kings	Oldfield Road 45.82889496943813°N 65.44921196243286°W	1910	28		Was pictured on 1992 quarter.	
Ward's Creek No.2 (MacFarlane)	Kings	Upper Wards Creek 45.6724295566161°N 65.50489462158203°W	1909	18			
Baker Brook No. 2 (Morneault)	Madawaska	Cyr Street 47.3286306492245°N 68.51381815216064°W	1939	29		Not in service	
Green River No. 3 (Boniface)	Madawaska	Boniface Road 47.35519193808738°N 68.1517413928222°W	1925	58			
Quisibis River No. 2	Madawaska	Deschenes Road 47.307170482435204°N 68.08582342407226°W	1951	17			
Mill Brook No. 0.5 (Nelson Hollow)	Northumberland	Lyons Road 46.544963878475926°N 66.1660698725891°W	1900	25		Not in service. Oldest covered bridge in New Brunswick.	
Gaspereau River No. 2 (Burpee)	Queens	Upper Gaspereau 46.246645848150436°N 65.86345232269286°W	1913	50			
Long Creek No. 1 (Starkey)	Queens	Starkey Road 45.91638373146396°N 65.80693281433105°W	1912	42		Reopened for vehicle traffic.	
Irish River No. 2 (Hardscrabble)	Saint John	Fundy-St. Martins 45.35920421812937°N 65.5365715100479°W	1946	22			
Tynemouth Creek	Saint John	Tynemouth 45.31407452001663°N 65.65531826755523°W	1927	29			
Irish River #1 (Vaughan Creek)	Saint John	Fundy-St. Martins 45.3587049°N 65.5325839°W	September 1, 2022	32		This bridge replaced the existing covered bridge. This is the only two-lane covered bridge in New Brunswick. There is a pedestrian walkway as well.	
Back Creek No. 2 (Hoyt Station)	Sunbury	Hoyt Station Road 45.57592165573874°N 66.56039751312255°W	1936	29			
Rusagonis River No. 2 (Patrick Owens)	Sunbury	Wilsey Road 45.82213635444821°N 66.58697284004211°W	1909	70		2 spans	
South Oromocto River No. 3 (Bell)	Sunbury	Mill Settlement 45.561260624501365°N 66.58842123291015°W	1912	42			
Odellach River No. 2 (Tomlinson Mill)	Victoria	Tomlinson Mill Road 46.79972016068662°N 67.49376333496093°W	1918	18			
Cocagne River (Poirier)	Westmorland	Poirier Office Road 46.2690832°N 64.7967009°W	1942	41			
Cocagne River (Budd)	Westmorland	Victoria Road 46.2398245°N 64.8879391°W	1913	25			
Coverdale River No. 7 (now at Magnetic Hill)	Westmorland	Magnetic Hill Theme Park 46.12014015140817°N 64.84661481520652°W	1983	18		Not owned by DTI	
Memramcook River No. 4 (Boudreau)	Westmorland	Gayton Road 46.02378547513947°N 64.55679810783386°W	1930	23			
Shediac River No. 4 (Joshua Gallant)	Westmorland	Shediac River Road 46.24156134266769°N 64.63276631376266°W	1935	26		Not in service	
Nackawick River No. 5 (Nackawic Siding)	York	Nortondale 46.1462001°N 67.2761764°W	1927	18			

== Defunct bridges ==
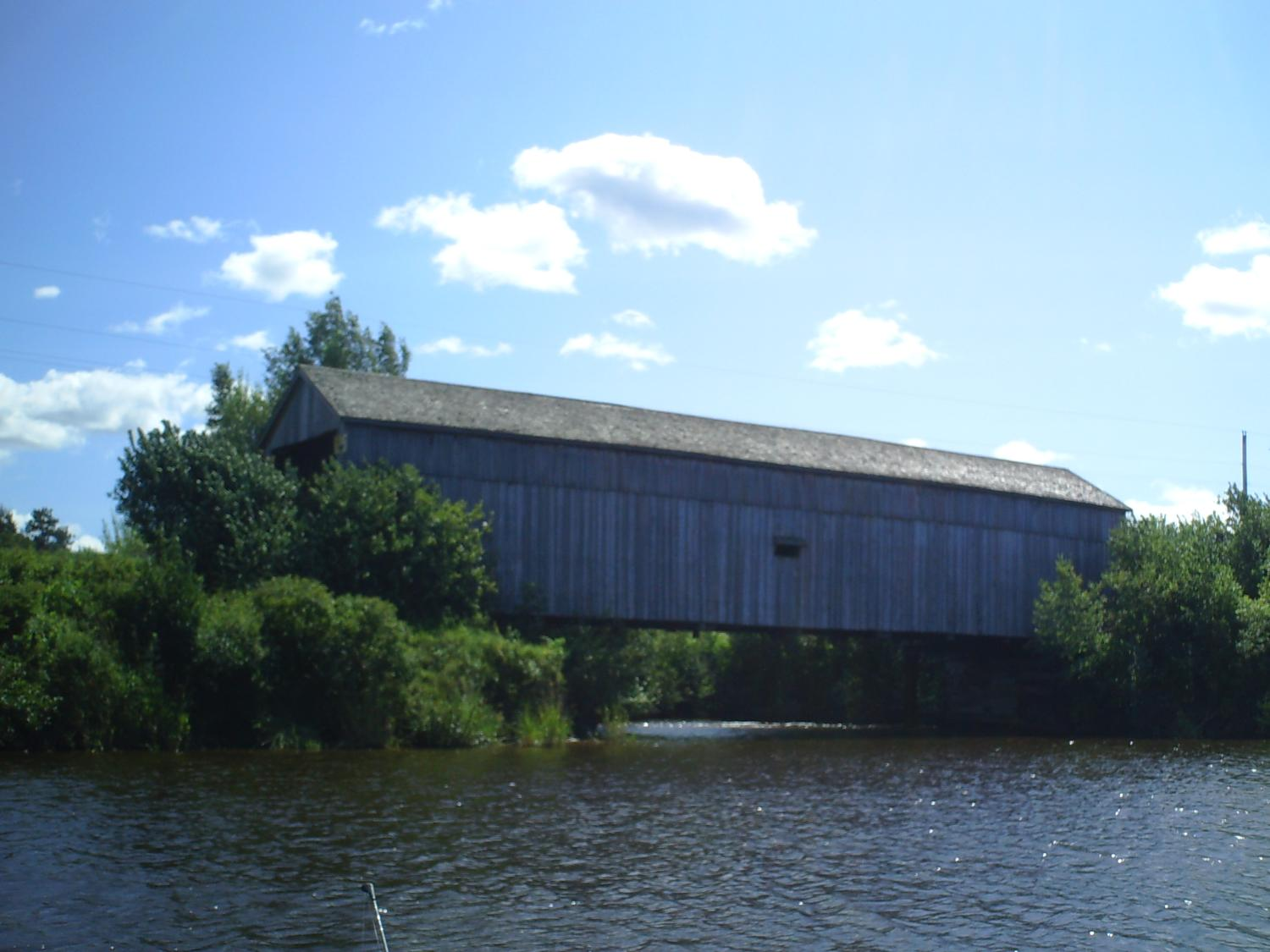
William Mitton Covered Bridge, now demolished

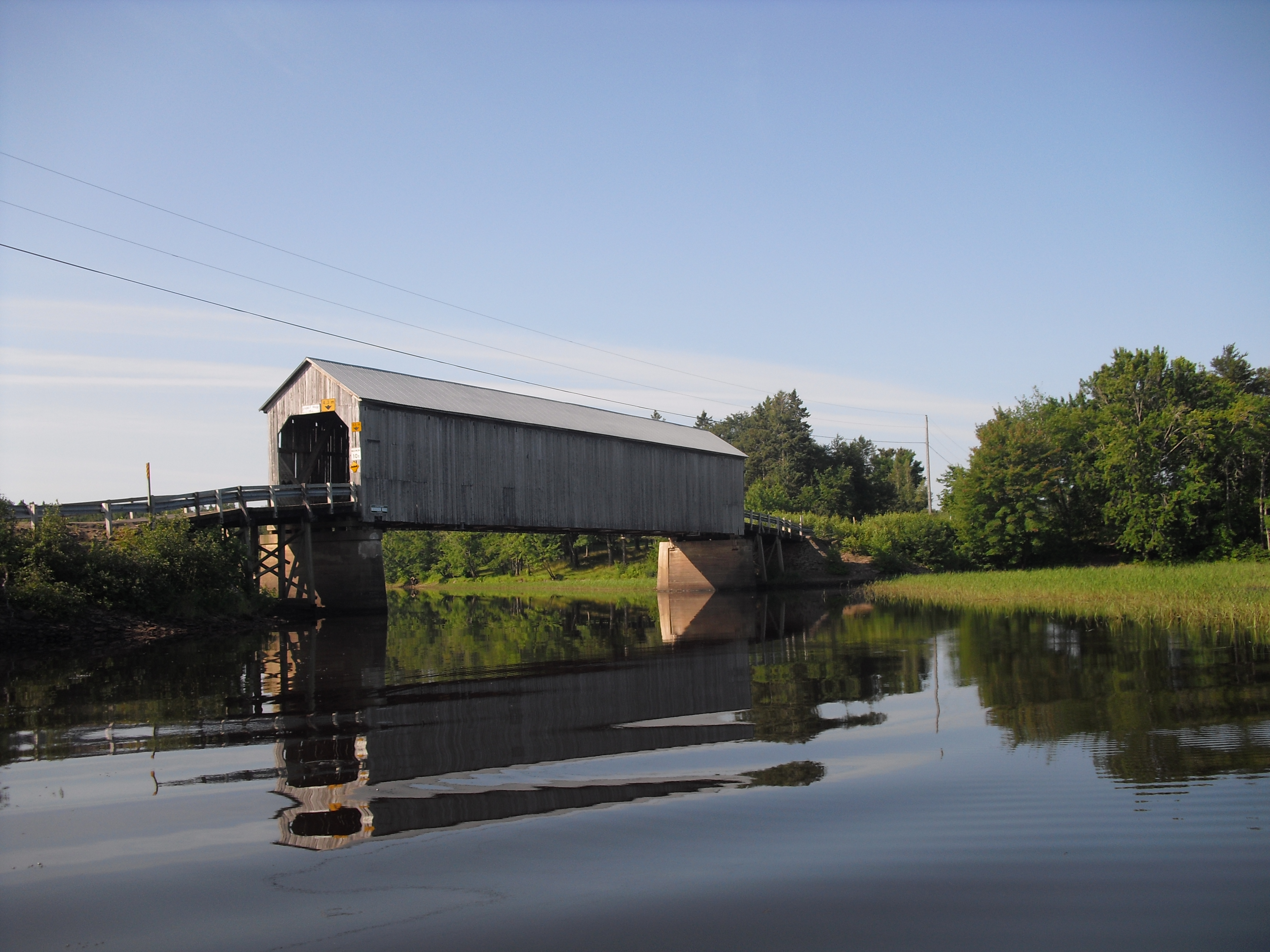
Canaan River New Brunswick, now defunct

In 2025, the William Mitton Covered Bridge over the mouth of a nameless small right tributary of Turtle Creek in Riverview, was demolished. It had fallen into disrepair over the years and could not be saved.

In 2018, the 87-year old Bell Bridge, near Hoyt, south of Fredericton, was demolished following flood damage.

In 2017, a 104-year-old covered bridge (Hammond River No. 2) over the Hammond River was demolished and replaced with a modular bridge. According to the provincial government, local residents did not wish to save it.

In 2014, the Cherryvale covered bridge, built in 1927, was washed away by flooding on the Canaan River and destroyed.

In 2011 the Mangrum or Stormdale Bridge (Becaguimec Stream No. 3), constructed in 1909, burned following probable arson.

In 2009 the Adair Bridge (North Becaguimec No. 1), constructed in 1948, was destroyed beyond repair by an arsonist.

In 2001, the 82-year-old Mundleville covered bridge burned down. At 153 metres, it was the second longest covered bridge in the province.
