= Point Wolfe Bridge =

Covered bridge in Fundy National Park

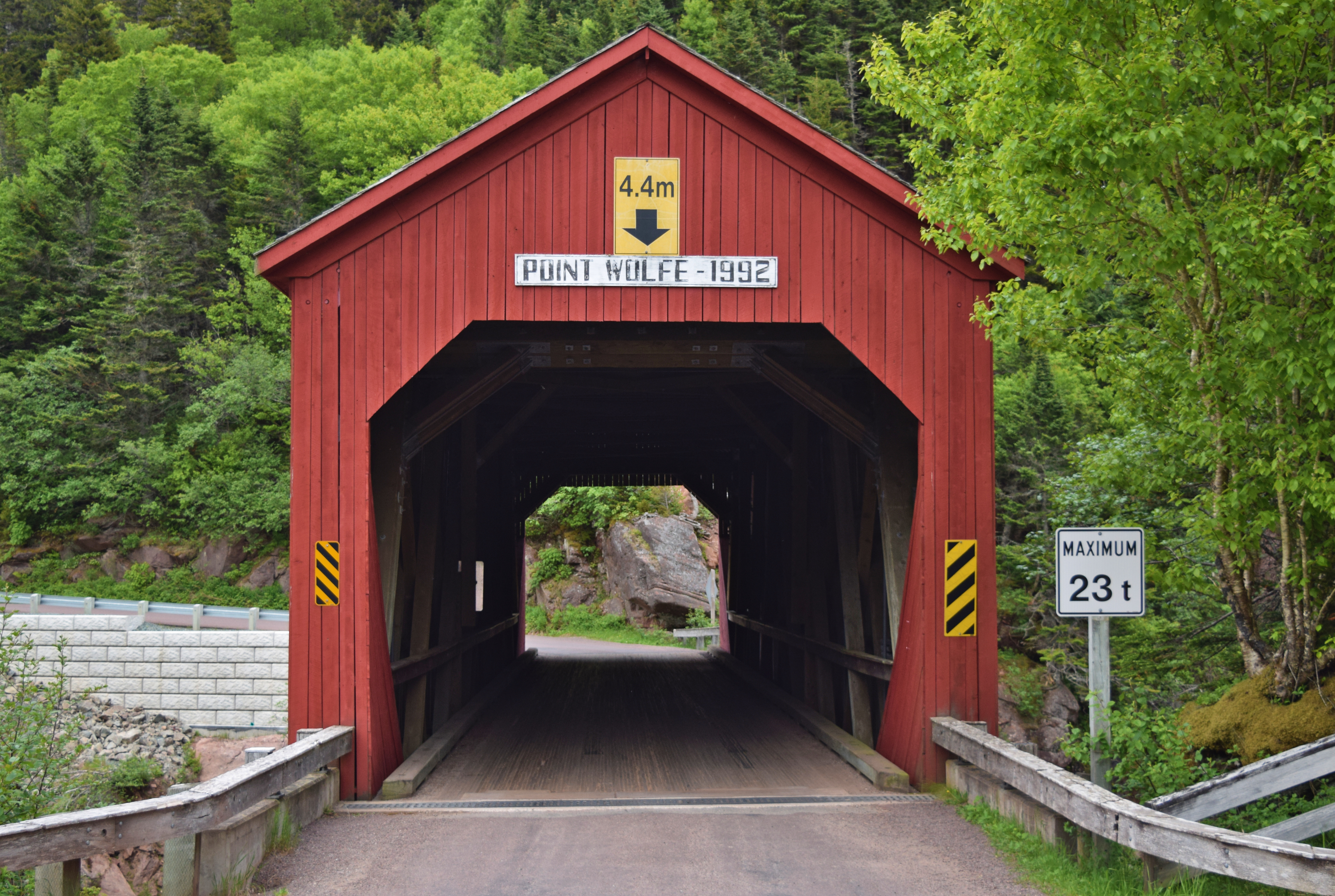
- Coordinates: 45°33′02″N 65°0′47″W
- Crosses: Point Wolfe River

Characteristics
- Design: Covered
- Material: Wood
- Total length: 28.8 m (94 ft)

History
- Built: 1909
- Opened: 1910
- Rebuilt: 1992

The Point Wolfe Bridge is a red covered bridge that crosses the Point Wolfe River at Fundy National Park in New Brunswick, Canada. It is one of the two covered bridges in Fundy National Park, connecting the Point Wolfe Road from the Point Wolfe campground to the rest of the park. It was originally built in 1909, following the collapse of a bridge one year prior. The Point Wolfe Bridge was once again rebuilt in 1992 after a workplace accident in December 1990 resulted in the bridge collapsing.

== History ==
Since 1853, there have been a total of five bridges that have stood in the location of Point Wolfe Bridge. One of these bridges fell in 1908, was rebuilt in 1909, and opened in 1910 at a cost of $1,456. The Point Wolfe Bridge predates Fundy National Park, which was created on April 10, 1948, and officially opened on July 29, 1950.

On December 29, 1990, the Point Wolfe Bridge collapsed when workers tried removing a rock that engineers deemed posed a safety risk to the bridge. The engineers decided to use explosives to remove the rock to save the bridge. The rock rolled down the slope above the bridge hitting the abutments and knocking the bridge off the abutments and into the river, causing it to collapse. Shortly following the accident, the federal government announced that they would be rebuilding the bridge with close resemblance to the former one, with a temporary bridge being used in the meantime. In 1992, it was rebuilt at a cost of CA$545,000.

== See also ==
- List of covered bridges in New Brunswick
