= Hebron, New Brunswick =

Coordinates: 45.633361°N 64.907889°W

Location of Hebron in New Brunswick

Hebron is a small community in Albert County overlooking the Bay of Fundy in the Canadian province of New Brunswick.

== History ==
Hebron was founded in 1832, but has since been absorbed by the nearby village of Alma.

== See also ==
- List of communities in New Brunswick
