= Upper Salmon River =

Watercourse in New Brunswick, Canada

Coordinates: 45.6062°N 64.9564°W

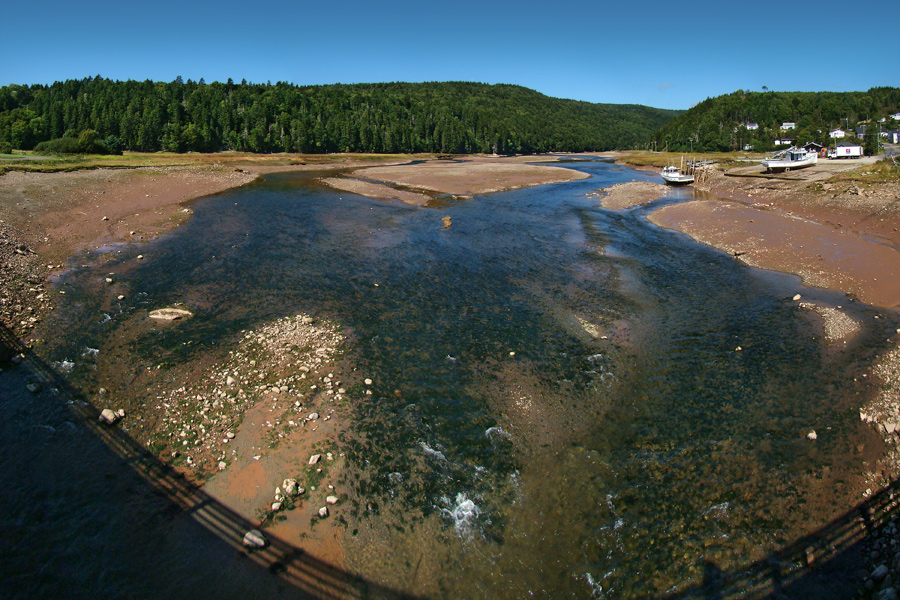
The Upper Salmon River at low tide

The Upper Salmon River divides Fundy National Park and the village of Alma, New Brunswick at its delta. Here, it is inundated with tidal water from the Salisbury Bay (Chignecto Bay) a kilometer to the site of a former dam, making for a large estuary and inter-tidal zone. Its watershed catchment drains a large area in and outside the park, made up of tributaries and their sub-units including Kinnie Brook, Laverty, Forty-five River, Lake Brook, Greenough Brook, and others.

It is a sub-unit within the Chignecto Bay North Watershed, an area designated under the UNESCO Programme on Man and the Biosphere. Macro-regionally, it is part of the Gulf of Maine watershed.

== History ==
Its name hints at the need to distinguish between the "salmon rivers" in the bay. More than one Salmon River existed within a number of miles in Saint Martins Parish, Saint John County including this one. Early land granting in the area was delayed by confusion over the Salmon River in question, and in the case of the initial grant on both sides of the Upper Salmon, it took a court judgement.

It is also referred to as the Alma River for the village by that name. In Alma's beginning, the settlement was named Salmon River Settlement.

Saint John county receded to the west in 1837, placing the river in Westmorland, and in 1856 the river transitioned from being at the furthest reaches of Westmorland to being included in the new Albert County.

At the creation of Fundy National Park, the river and its tributary Lake Brook formed the southern boundary.

== Ecosystems ==
The inter-tidal areas are teeming with life, as it is said these are some of the most productive ecosystems in the world. Currently, researchers are tagging and tracking Atlantic Salmon and American Eels in order to better understand the anadromous fish and their habitats.

Tall Acadian forest flanks the river and its tributaries in the very steep and rocky river valleys.

== See also ==
- List of rivers of New Brunswick
