= Fundy National Park =

National park of Canada

Fundy National Park _{Parc national de Fundy (French)}
- IUCN category II (national park)
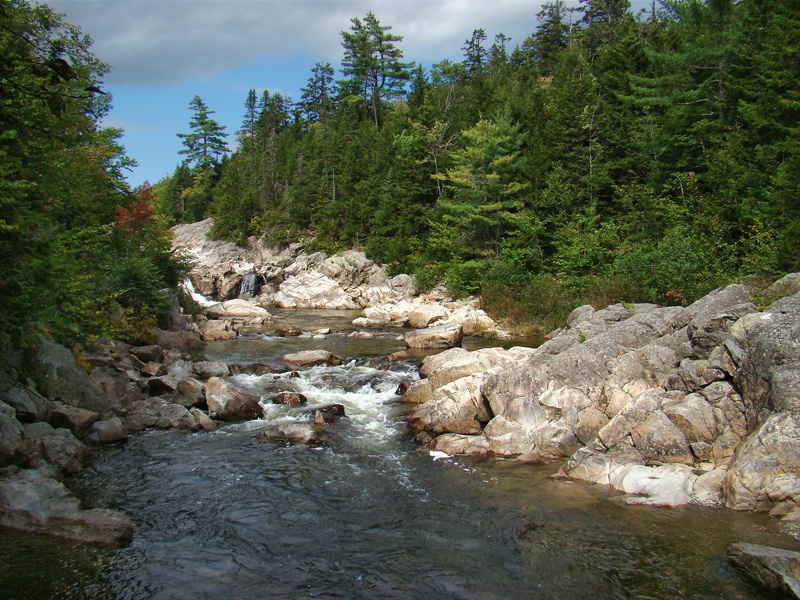
- The Moosehorn Trail

- Location within Canada Location within New Brunswick
- Interactive map of Fundy National Park _{Parc national de Fundy (French)}
- Location: Alma, New Brunswick, Canada
- Coordinates: 45°35′43″N 64°57′14″W
- Area: 207 km^{2} (80 sq mi)
- Established: April 10, 1948; 78 years ago
- Visitors: 303,575 (in 2022–23)
- Governing body: Parks Canada
- Website: https://pc.gc.ca/pn-np/nb/fundy

Fundy National Park is a national park of Canada located on the Bay of Fundy, near the village of Alma, New Brunswick. It was created on April 10, 1946 and officially opened on July 29, 1950. The park showcases a rugged coastline which rises up to the Canadian Highlands, the highest tides in the world and more than 25 waterfalls. The park covers an area of 207 km^{2} (80 sq mi) along Goose Bay, the northwestern branch of the Bay of Fundy. When one looks across the Bay, one can see the northern Nova Scotia coast.

At low tide, park visitors can explore the ocean floor where a variety of sea creatures (e.g., dog whelk, periwinkles, various seaweeds) cling to life. At high tide, the ocean floor disappears under 15 m (49 ft) of salt water.

Park amenities include a golf course, a heated saltwater swimming pool, three campgrounds, and a network of over 100 km (62 mi) of hiking and biking trails. There are 25 hiking trails throughout the park. The Caribou Plains trail and boardwalk provides access to upland forest and bog habitats. Dickson Falls is the most popular trail in the park. During the winter, Fundy National Park is available for day use, at one's own risk. Visitors use the park to go cross-country skiing, snowshoeing, tobogganing, and winter walking. The cross-country ski trails are groomed by the local Chignecto Ski Club.

A variety of scientific projects are ongoing in the park, with the primary focus on monitoring the park's ecology. Recent projects have focused on re-establishing aquatic connectivity in the park (Bennett Lake Dam, new Culverts, Dickson Brook restoration. Species such as the endangered Inner Bay of Fundy Atlantic salmon, martens, fishers, brook trout, eel, and moose are monitored regularly.

The Dobson Trail and Fundy Footpath extend out of the park to Riverview and to Fundy-St. Martins respectively. A unique red-painted covered bridge is located at Point Wolfe.

Other rivers that flow through the park include the:

- Broad River
- Point Wolfe River
- Upper Salmon River

== History ==
=== Indigenous period and colonization ===
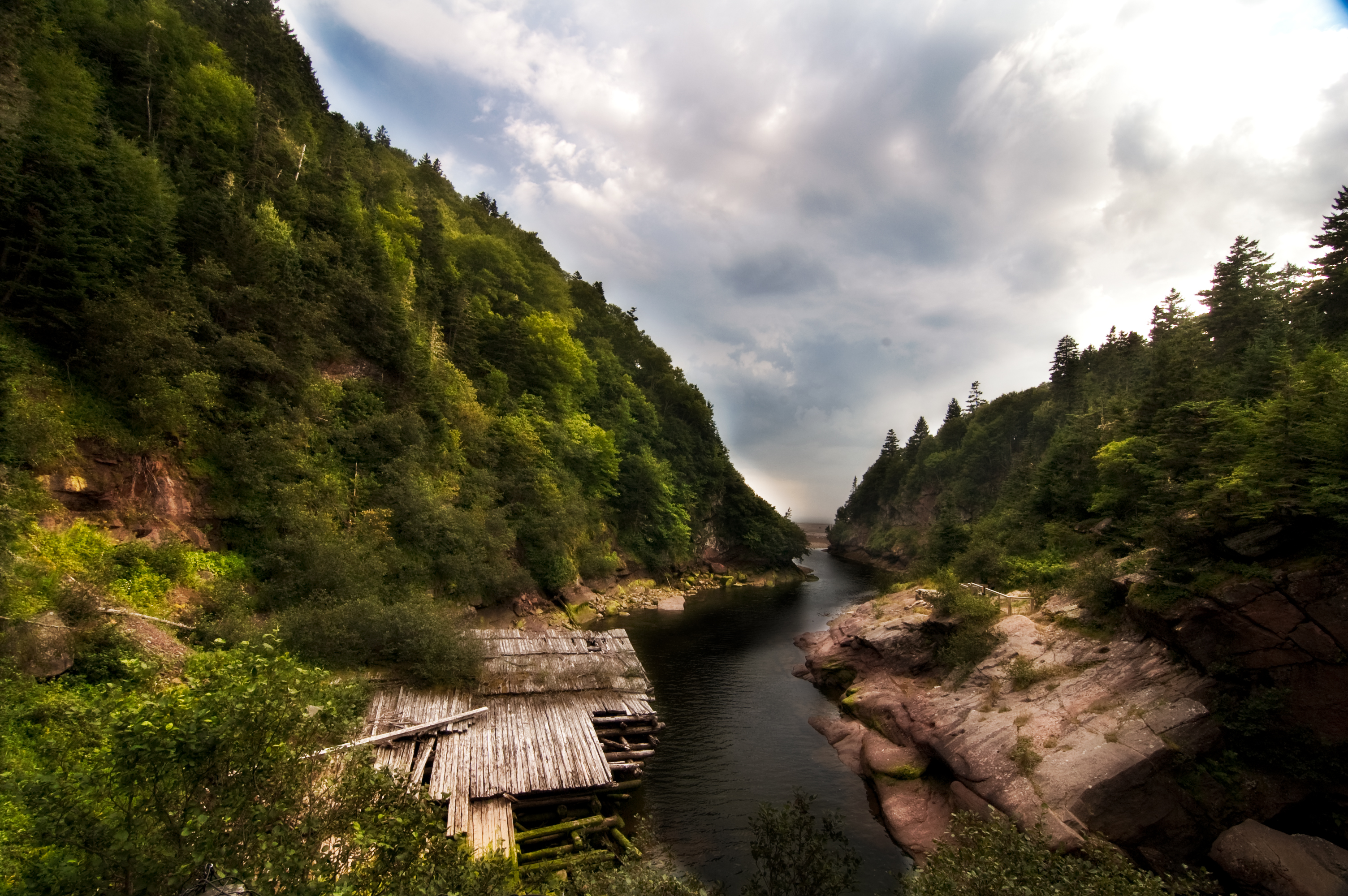
Ruins of a dam in Point Wolfe River

The area that is now Fundy National Park had been at one point inhabited by the Mi'kmaq and Maliseet peoples, but this was suggested as having been temporary due to few traces of remains indicating permanent settlement.

In the late 1600s and the early 1700s, the surrounding area was being settled by Acadians. One of these settlements included Chipoudy (now Shepody), established in 1710 and inhabited by Acadians until they were driven out by the British in the Expulsion of the Acadians. It was not until 1825 that the park's region was permanently settled by Europeans: in particular, immigrants from Scotland, Ireland, and England. Despite having been granted to settlers for use, the lands on the plateaus were unsuitable for agriculture, and were abandoned within a generation.

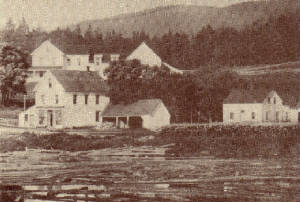
Village of Point Wolfe, c. 1915

The coastal villages were much more prosperous; the most notable settlement of them all, Point Wolfe, flourished from fishing, sawmills, and small shipyards. Jobs in the area were primarily seasonal: during the winter, most men worked in lumber camps and participated in log driving in the spring, both of which were their primary sources of income; in the summer and fall, they worked on the farm; all the while the women managed household tasks year-round.

However, the logging industry eventually led to a depletion of wood resources by the late 19th and early 20th centuries, causing an exodus of most of the area's residents. In addition, the clogging of the rivers by sawmill waste had damaged fish stocks and prevented the salmon from spawning in the area, resulting in fishermen abandoning their weirs.

=== Creation ===
The seven proposed sites during the creation of the park (French)

The proposal for a national park to be established in the province first came from a petition organized by the New Brunswick Fish and Game Association in 1927, with the aim to protect endangered animals in the region. In 1928 the association formed a committee composed of notable figures from the province and selected six potential sites, with Mount Carleton and Albert County being the most likely candidates. After surveying the proposed parks, the National Parks Branch favoured a site at Lepreau, followed by the Albert site, contradicting the provincial figures such as William Francis Ganong who preferred Mount Carleton, which was already known for its hunting and fishing tourism. In response, the federal government favours the Mount Champlain site, located between Saint John and Fredericton, which was not proposed by the province. The disagreements made between the federal and provincial governments about which site should be chosen, along with the lack of vision of what a New Brunswick park should be, resulted in the project being postponed around 1937. The issue was resurfaced after the end of the Second World War, and out of the Branch's proposed sites of Lepreau, Mount Champlain, and Albert, the province finalized on choosing the latter site.

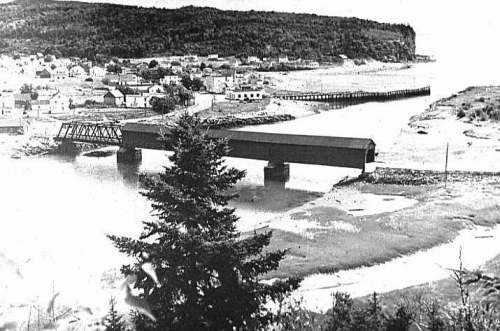
The village of Alma around 1930

The expropriation process in Fundy was met with mixed reactions, but it ultimately proceeded more smoothly compared to the national parks of Cape Breton Highlands and Prince Edward Island due to the greater communication efforts made by New Brunswick, which better prepared the expropriated landowners. New Brunswick demonstrated a more generous approach by allowing for landowners to make an appeal if they were dissatisfied, and the overall process was done more swiftly. The targeted area for expropriation consisted of about half crown land, which was licensed to Hollingsworth and Whitney, a forestry company from Maine. The remaining land consisted of 130 privately owned properties. The provincial government quickly purchased the land owned and leased by Hollingsworth for $325,000 CAD, which was accepted by the company with satisfaction. Afterwards, the region's two sawmills were then expropriated, with the province compensating the owners with $16,000 CAD and about $6,000 CAD, respectively. Homeowners were expropriated thereafter, with most receiving varying compensation amounts ranging from $4,000 to $10,000, while cottage owners were compensated with $2,000. In total, expropriating the landscape cost the province over $850,000. Following the expropriations, all previous structures were demolished and their remains were burned, much to the disappointment of the former residents. Subsequently, most of the expropriated individuals settled in Alma, located just east from the park. The park was officially created on April 10, 1948.

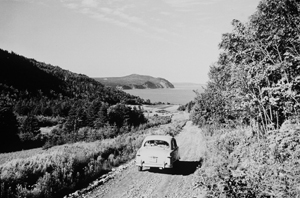
Herring Cove, as seen from the park road in 1950

The initial two national parks in Atlantic Canada demonstrated considerable success, as evidenced by a significant increase in attendance between 1945 - 1948. This trend of increased national park visitation was seen all across Canada, with attendance numbers doubling between 1945 - 1947. Consequently, this encouraged the Parks Branch to substantiate a much larger investment into Fundy compared to previous park developments. From 1948 to 1950, the branch dedicated over $2.2 million towards Fundy National Park, compared to the $1.1 million expenditure for the first four years of development for the Cape Breton Highlands National Park.

The park headquarters' construction started at a particular site, at the expense of the site's natural and cultural heritage. A nine-hole golf course was designed by Stanley Thompson and constructed alongside the road leading to Point Wolfe at a cost of $100,000. Additionally, a swimming pool was established near Alma West's beach. To provide accommodation within the park, designated campgrounds were developed, designed to accommodate tents and trailers. Additionally, 29 cottages were constructed in a location overlooking the park's golf course. One of the more significant expenses was that of the park superintendent's residence. Initially authorized at a price of $12,000, the project eventually incurred a total cost of $30,000 by the time it was finished, a price equivalent to the value of three to four farms in Alma. The park headquarters area also saw the installation of the New Brunswick School of Arts and Crafts, but it later disappeared.

== Natural environment ==
According to the Commission for Environmental Cooperation, the park is located in the Level III- Eastern Temperate Forests (Maine-New Brunswick Plains and Hills) ecoregion. According to the Ecological Framework of Canada, the park is situated in two distinct ecoregions. The southern section of the park falls in the Fundy Coast ecoregion. This region experiences cool, wet summers and mild, rainy winters. Its coniferous forest consists of red spruce, balsam fir, and red maple with some white spruce, and white and yellow birch. Some sugar maple and beech trees are also found here at higher elevations. The northern section of the park falls in the Southern New Brunswick Uplands ecoregion. This ecoregion experiences summers that are warm and rainy, and winters that are mild and snowy. Its mixed-wood forest contains mainly sugar and red maple, white and red spruce and balsam fir trees. Finally, according to the World Wide Fund for Nature, the park is located in the New England-Acadian forest ecoregion.

=== Flora ===
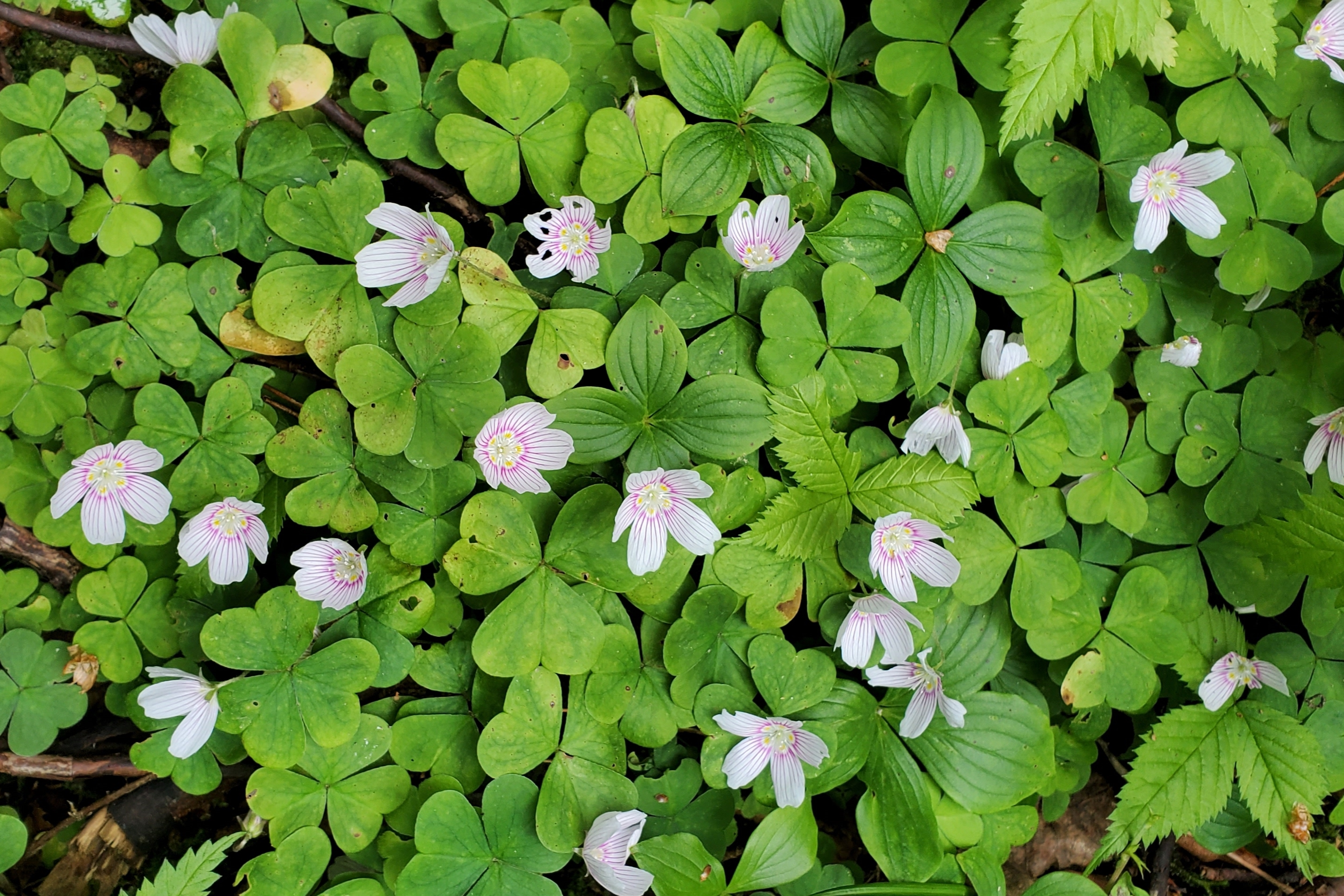
Patch of oxalis montana found in Fundy National Park.

The park is home to 658 species of vascular plants, 276 species of bryophytes, and more than 400 species of lichens. The Fundy forest is generally a mixed-wood forest composed of red spruce (Picea rubens), balsam fir (Abies balsamea), yellow birch (Betula alleghaniensis), white birch (Betulla papyrifera), sugar maple (Acer saccharum), and red maple (Acer rubrum). The mixed-wood forest floor is blanketed with moss, wood fern (Dryopteris), and bunchberry (Cornus canadensis).

Pure hardwood stands (distinguishable communities of tree species within a forest) account for 5.4% of the Fundy forest cover. The most abundant pure hardwood stands are yellow birch (Betula alleghaniensis) and white birch (Betulla papyrifera). There are also some sugar maple (Acer saccharum), red maple (Acer rubrum), and beech (Fagus) stands. Carolina springbeauty (Claytonia caroliniana) and trout-lily (Erythronium americanum) bloom in the hardwood forest every year.

The coniferous forest in the park represents the boreal element of Fundy's forest cover. Although pure stands of conifer are rare in the park, the Fundy forest has some of the last pure stands of red spruce (Picea rubens) found in eastern North America.

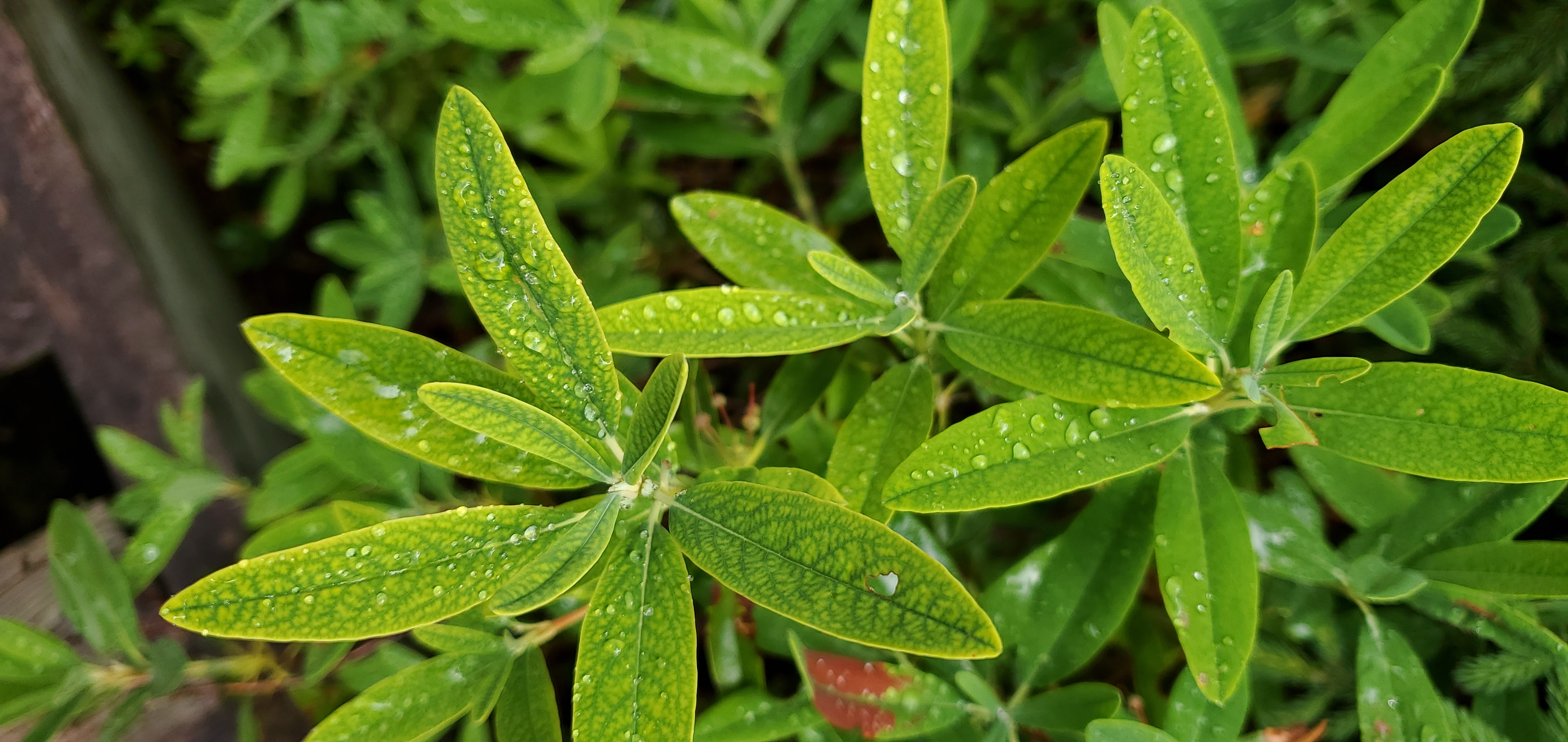
Labrador tea shrub on the Kinnie Brook trail in Fundy National Park.

The bogs of the park are blanketed with sphagnum moss (Sphagnum) from which grow black spruce (Picea mariana) and Eastern larch (Larix laricina). Within the park's Caribou Plain bog, three carnivorous plant species are found: pitcher plant (Sarracenia purpurea), sundew (Drosera anglica), and bladderwort (Utricularia).

Some rare plant species are also found in the park. Bird's-eye primrose (Primula farinosa) is found along the Point Wolfe and Goose River coastal cliffs, and several other rare flora species, namely slender spikemoss (Selaginella viridissima), squashberry (Viburnum edule), green spleenwort (Asplenium viride), rare sedges, and fir clubmoss (Huperzia selago), are found along the eastern branch of the Point Wolfe River and the lower part of Bennett Brook.

=== Fauna ===
==== Mammals ====
There are 38 species of mammals in Fundy National Park, the ones most commonly found being eastern moose, white-tailed deer, eastern coyotes, chipmunks, red squirrels and snowshoe hares, with more nocturnal mammals in the park being various mice and shrews, raccoons, black bears, North American beavers and northern flying squirrels. Bats have also been spotted in the park, and due to an increase in sightings in 2020 the park installed ultrasonic bat monitors.

==== Birds ====
Within the Fundy Park region, over 260 species of birds have been discovered in the area, with approximately 95 of which having nested in the park itself. Among the most commonly found species in the park include varieties of warblers, pileated woodpeckers, juncos, white-winged crossbills, great blue herons, cormorants, semipalmated sandpipers and semipalmated plovers. Around during the park's creation in 1948, the peregrine falcon had been extirpated, but was later successfully reintroduced.

==== Reptiles and amphibians ====
Fundy Park also encompasses various reptiles and amphibians within its boundaries. Identified species in the park include 4 types of nonpoisonous snakes: green snakes, red-bellied snakes, ring-necked snakes and eastern garter snakes, the most common and largest out of them all.

Amphibians in Fundy Park include various frogs, toads and salamanders. Among the frog species found in the area are American toads, leopard frogs, pickerel frogs, green frogs and bullfrogs. Salamanders, on the other hand, include seven species: yellow-spotted salamanders, red-backed salamanders, northern two-lined salamanders, eastern newts as well as three additional species, the four-toed salamander, blue-spotted salamander and northern dusky salamander being considered as rare.

== Tourism and administration ==
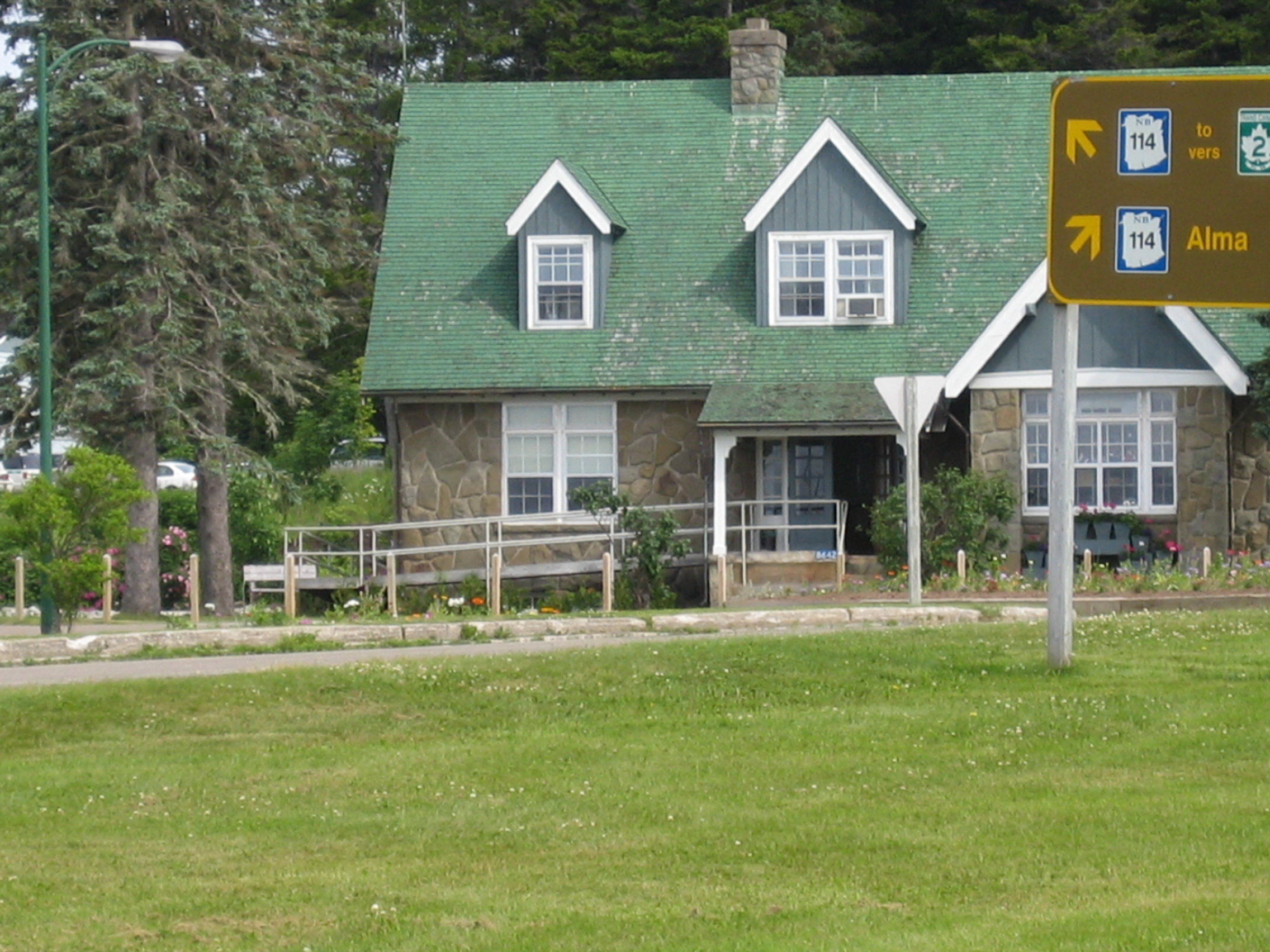
Fundy National Park's administration building

Located in Alma, New Brunswick, Fundy National Park is under the management of Parks Canada, an agency of Environment Canada that is overseen by the Canadian government. In the fiscal year of 2013-2014, Parks Canada allocated a budget of $693.7 million to maintain its portfolio of 44 national parks, 964 places of national historic significance, and 4 national marine conservation areas. Out of these national historic sites, 167 are under the direct administration of Parks Canada.

=== Attendance ===
The park received 240,481 visitors during the 2012-2013 year; a decrease of 7% compared to 2011–2012. It is the most visited Parks Canada site in New Brunswick. Data from previous years reveal that 40% of people who camped at the park were from New Brunswick, 8% were from Nova Scotia or Prince Edward Island, and 52% were from outside the Maritimes. In 2005, visitors from outside of the Maritimes were 59% adult couples and 29% families; while visitors from the Maritimes were 67% families and 24% adult couples.

=== Infrastructure ===
New Brunswick Route 114 crosses and connects Route 1 to Fundy National Park, and is the primary route used by tourists coming from outside the province and country. In the past, this part of the road leading to the park has been described as having "embarrassing" conditions, filled with potholes and gashed pavement. Upgrades to this road has gone underway, with $4 million being spent in 2019 by the provincial and federal governments.

The park itself has a road network spanning 72 km, 34 km of which is paved, while the rest is covered by gravel. Two covered bridges are located within the park. The Forty Five River #1 covered bridge, built in 1914, leads to Forty-five Road. Its name comes from the river it crosses, Forty-five River, which was named due to it taking 45 minutes for water originating from upstream to reach the Alma River. The Point Wolfe Bridge, built in 1992, is located 8 kilometres (5.0 mi) west of the park's entrance and provides access to the Point Wolfe campground, which operates during the summer. The Point Wolfe Bridge started construction in 1991 after the original bridge, which was built in 1910, was destroyed in December 1990 following a construction accident.

==== Campgrounds ====
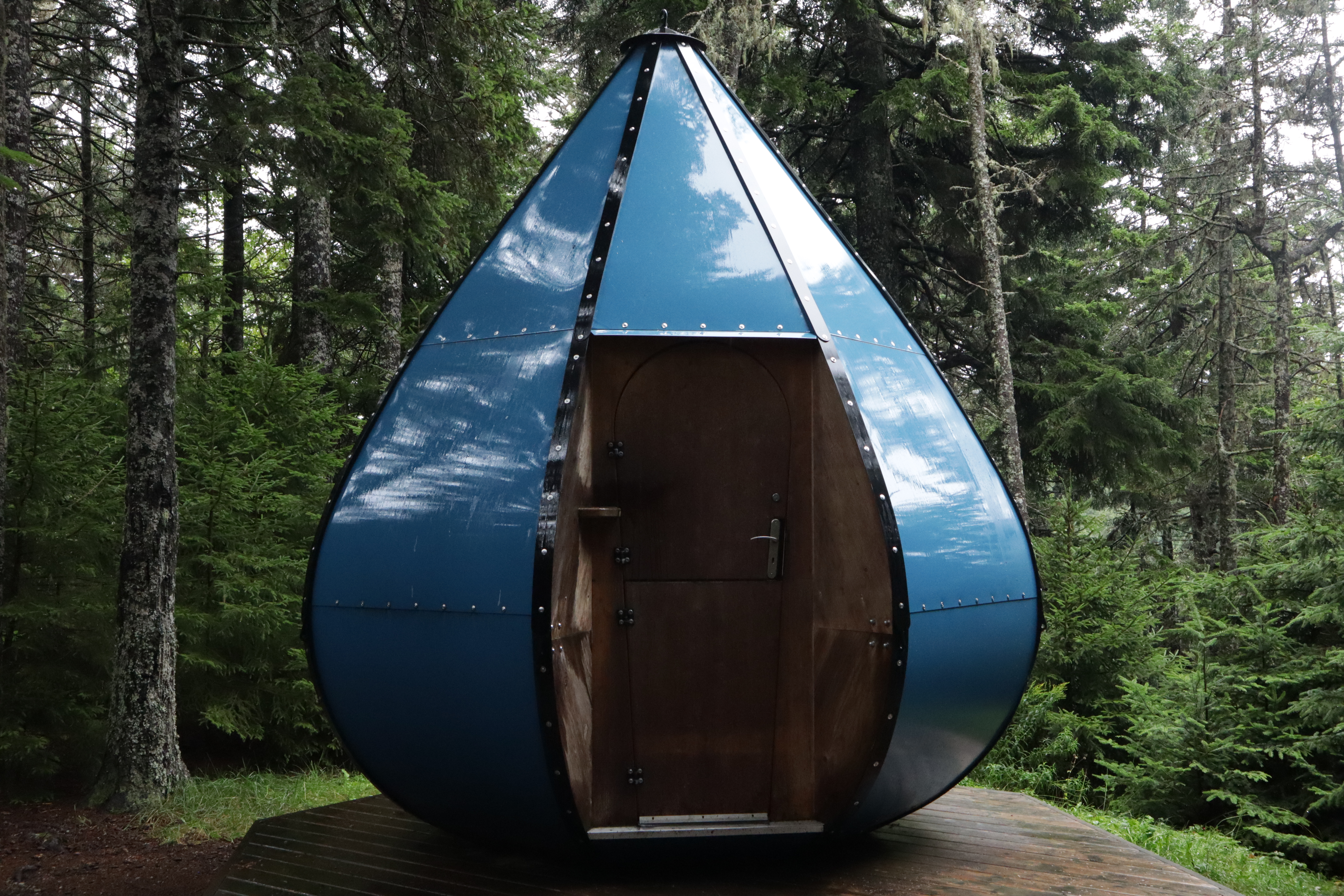
An example of an Ôasis unit at the Point Wolfe campground

Fundy National Park features a total of five main campgrounds: Chignecto North, Headquarters, Cannontown, Point Wolfe, and Lakeview. These campgrounds vary in operation dates, with some lasting throughout the summer months and others lasting year-round. These campgrounds together offer a sum of 521 camping and trailer sites, which vary in terms of services. Some sites are unserviced, while others provide electricity and water, with some even offering sewage. Among these campgrounds, three offer a combined total of 33 oTENTik units, which resembles a combination between a tent and a rustic cabin. Additionally, the Headquarters campground provides five yurts, and two campgrounds collectively offer six Ôasis units, which resembles a tear drop and measures 6 square metres (65 ft^{2}). A winter shelter is offered at Point Wolfe, which is used from November to April. In addition to the main campsites, Fundy National Park offers eight backcountry campsites, located at five bodies of water and operated from May through October. Year-round rustic cabins are also offered.

The park previously offered additional camping at the Chignecto South campground as well as a campground southeast of Wolfe Lake, which were both developed in the late 1960s in response to rising visitor traffic, however these have both been subsequently closed. The Chignecto Recreation Area now occupies the space of the former Chignecto South campground. The Chignecto campground area was originally known as Bogle Farm.

==== Trails ====
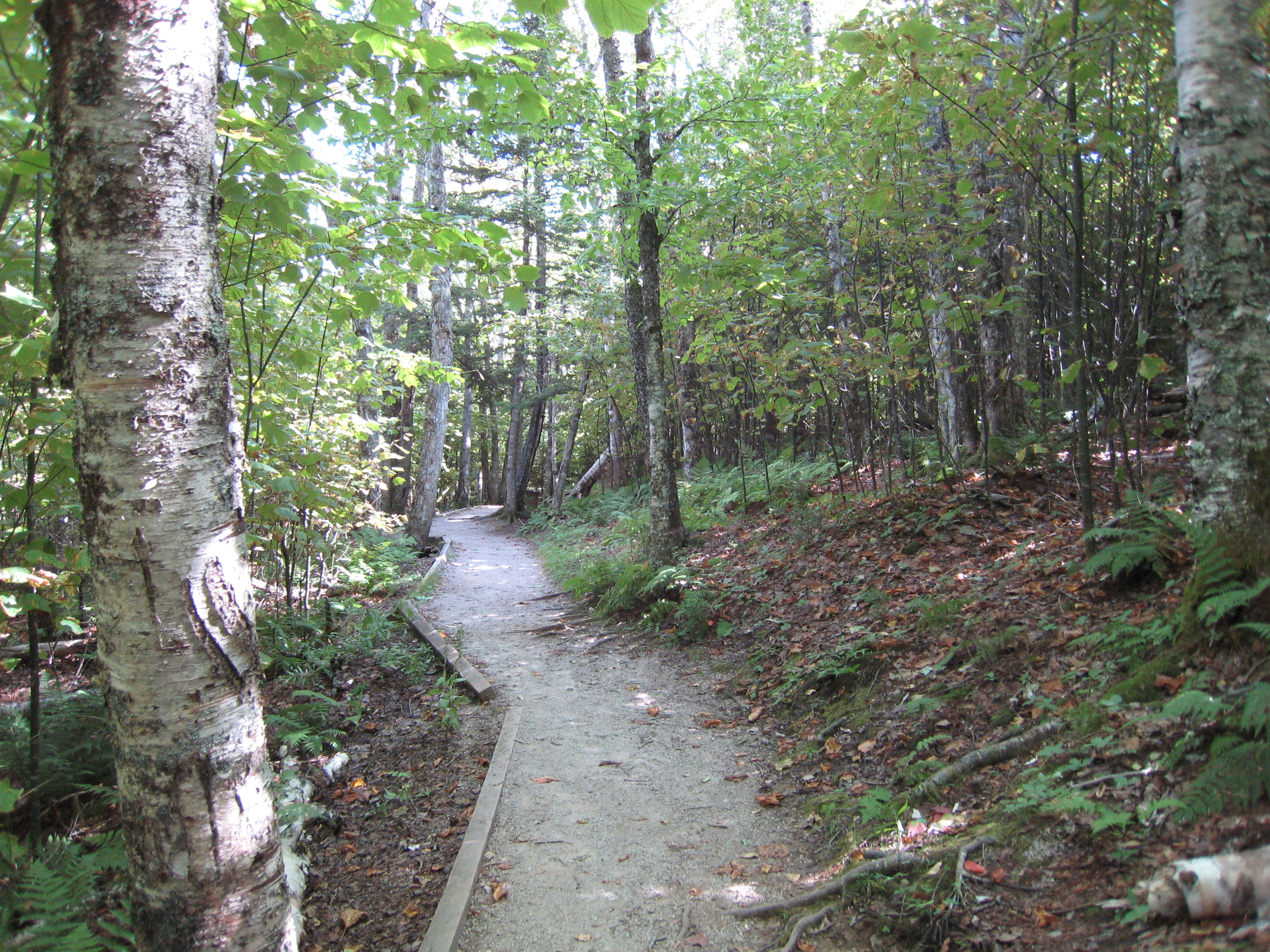
Trail in a yellow birch grove

Fundy National Park includes 35 hiking trails spanning over 100 kilometres (62 mi), varying in length and difficulty. Additionally, the park is linked to two long hiking trails: the Dobson Trail (58 km) and the Fundy Footpath (64.3 km). The Dobson Trail connects the park to Riverview, while the Fundy Footpath leads to the Big Salmon River, located near St. Martins. Moreover, within Fundy Park itself, 48 km of interconnected trails form the Fundy Circuit, which loops around the park. Out of the 35 hiking trails located within the park, 15 of them are additionally accessible to mountain bikes. The park also features a pump track at the Chignecto Recreation Area.

=== Amalgamation ===
The park includes several communities when it was expropriated including:

- Hastings
- Upper Salmon River
- Butland Settlement

== See also ==
- National Parks of Canada
- List of national parks of Canada
- List of parks in New Brunswick
- List of trails in New Brunswick
- List of mountains of New Brunswick
- List of waterfalls of New Brunswick
- List of beaches in New Brunswick

== Bibliography ==
- MacEachern, Alan (2001). Natural selections: national parks in Atlantic Canada, 1935-1970. Montreal, Quebec: McGill-Queen's University Press. ISBN 0773521577.
- Majka, Mary (1977). Fundy National Park. Fredericton, New Brunswick: Brunswick Press. ISBN 9780887900921.

== Gallery ==
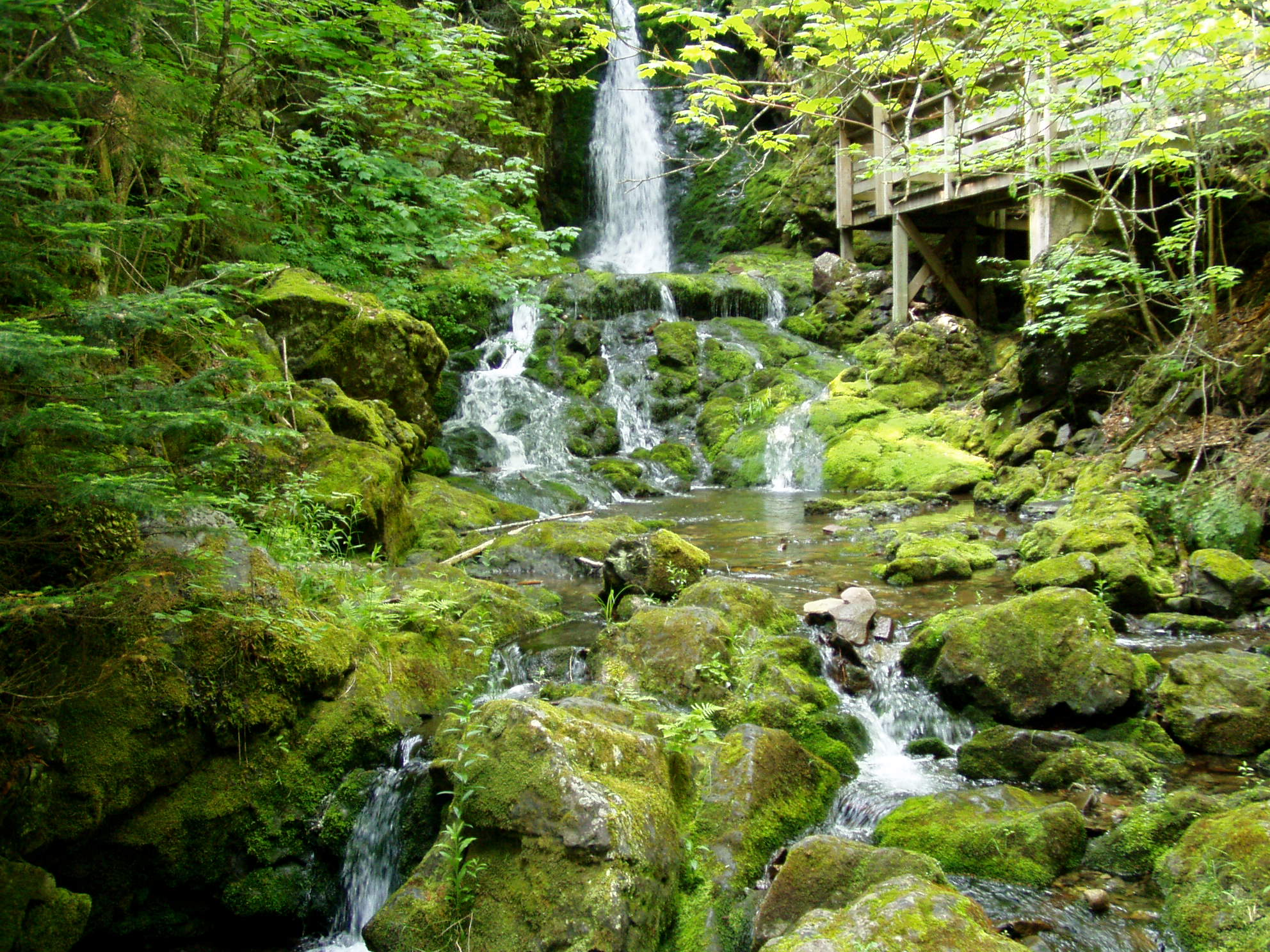
Dickson Falls

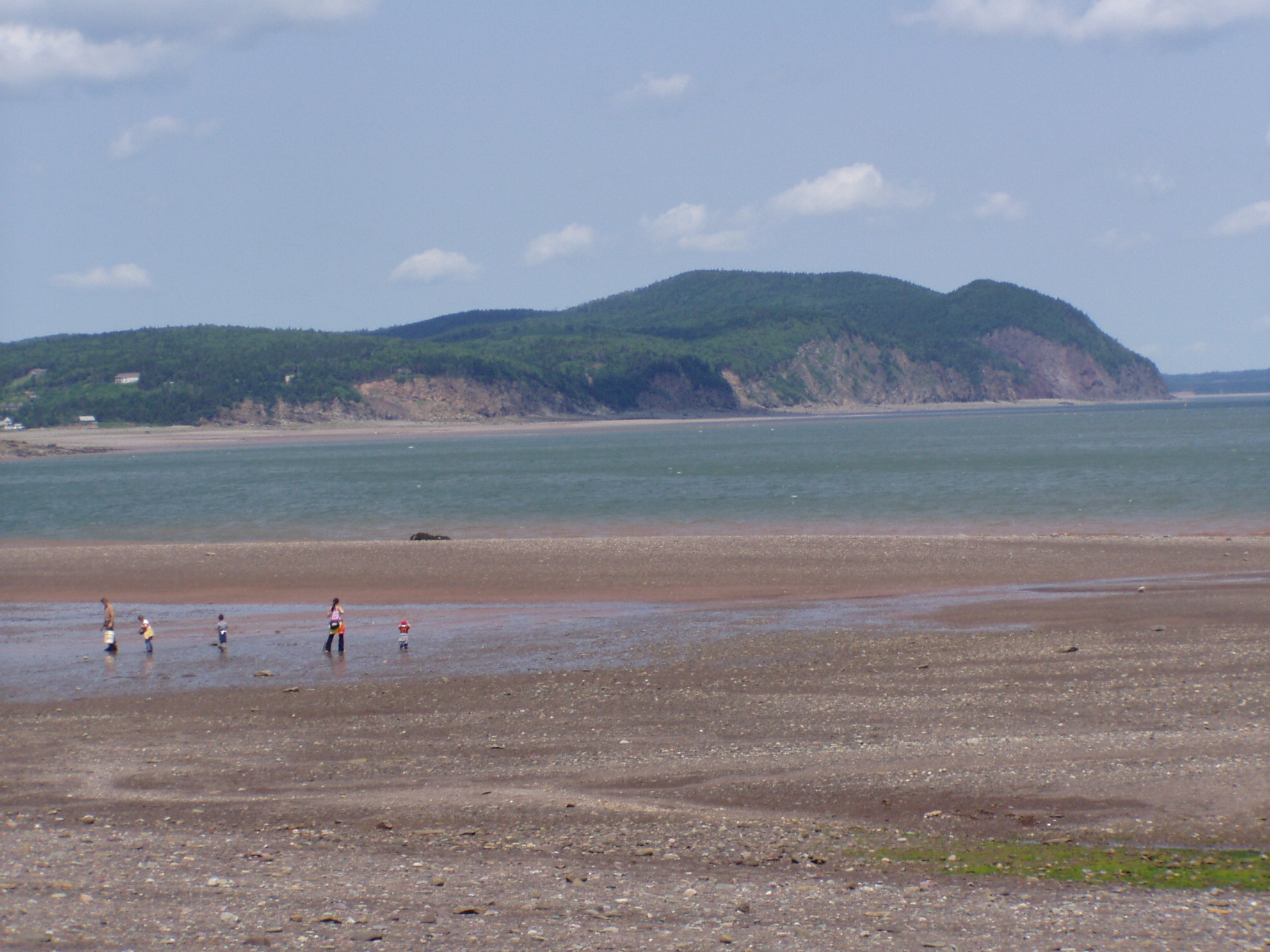
Alma Beach at low tide

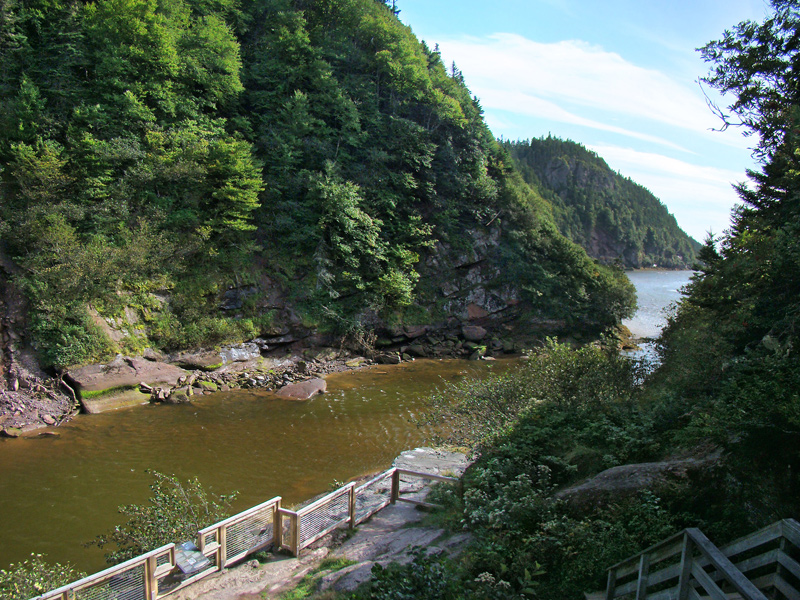
Point Wolfe

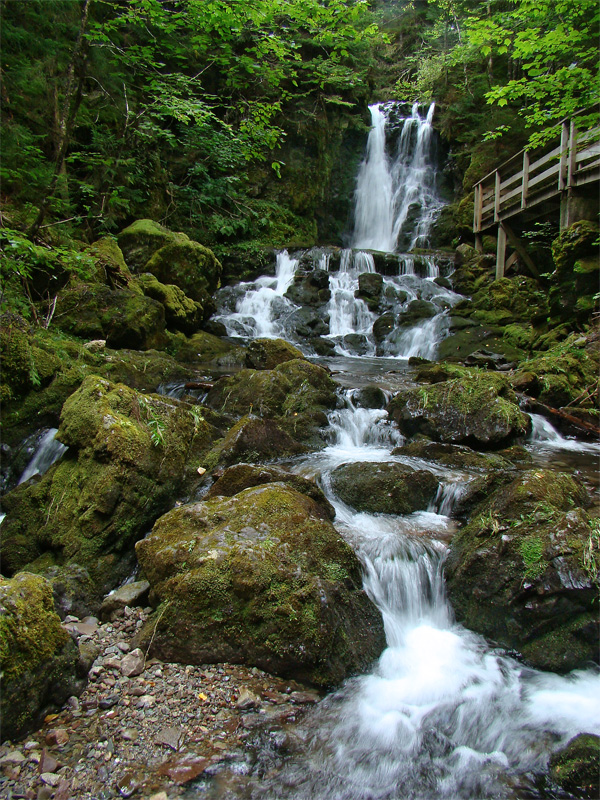
Dickson Falls

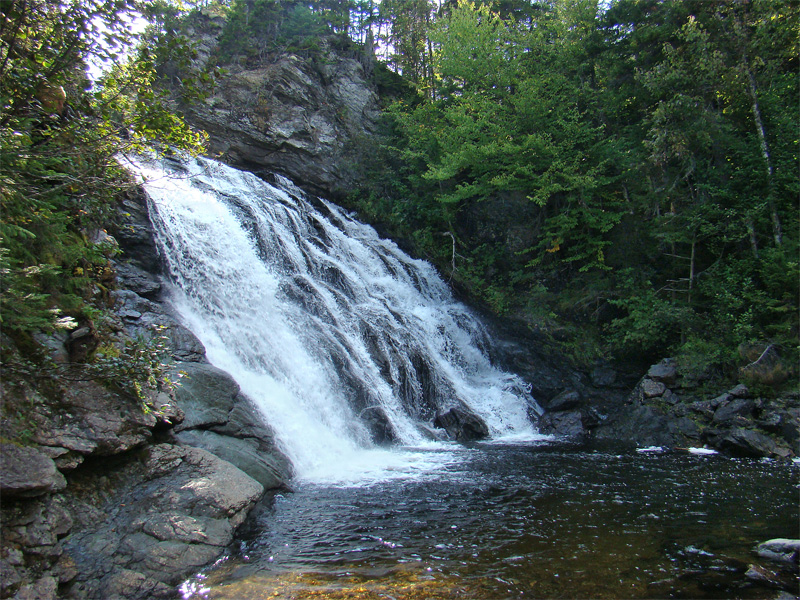
Laverty Falls

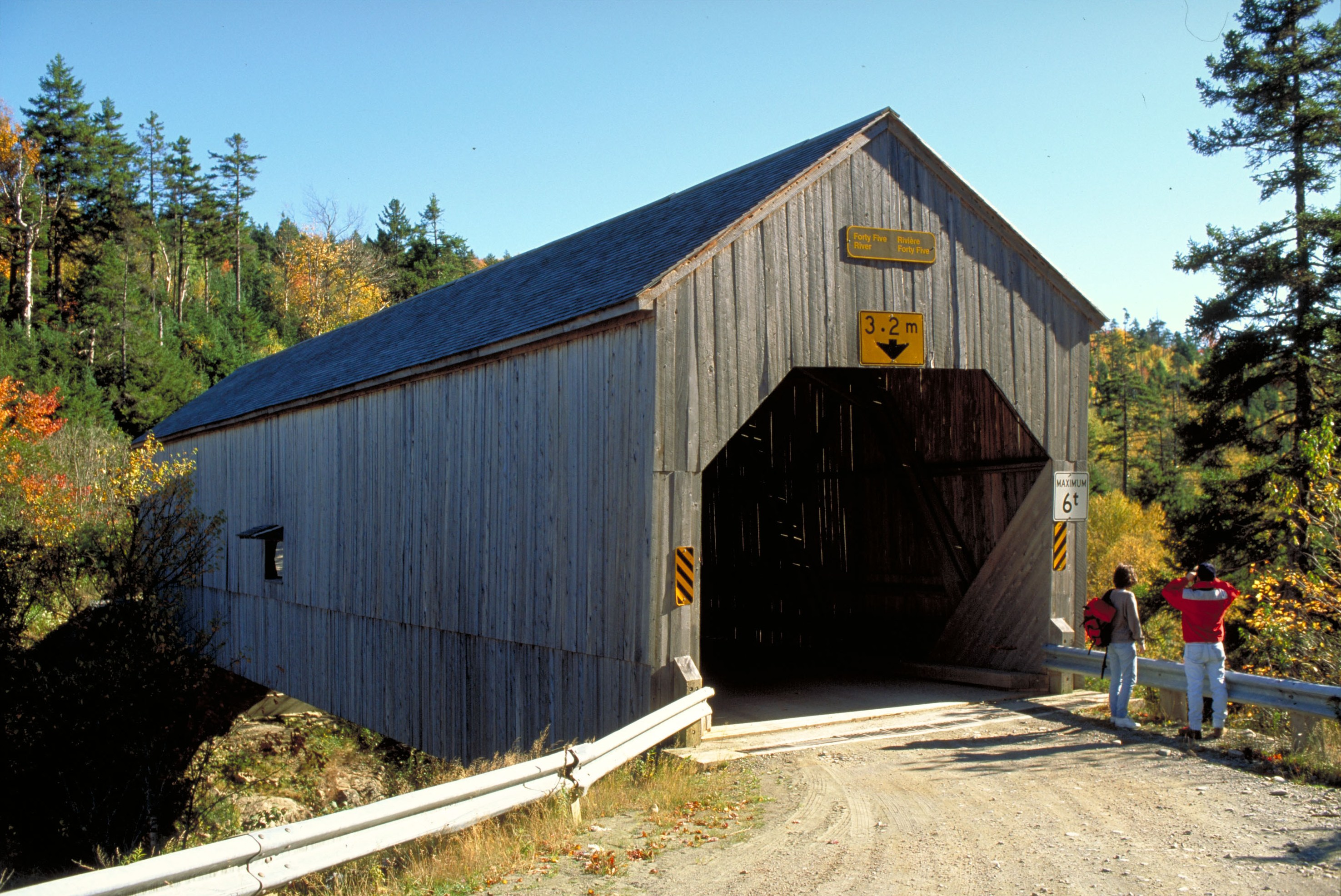
Forty Five River No. 1 covered bridge

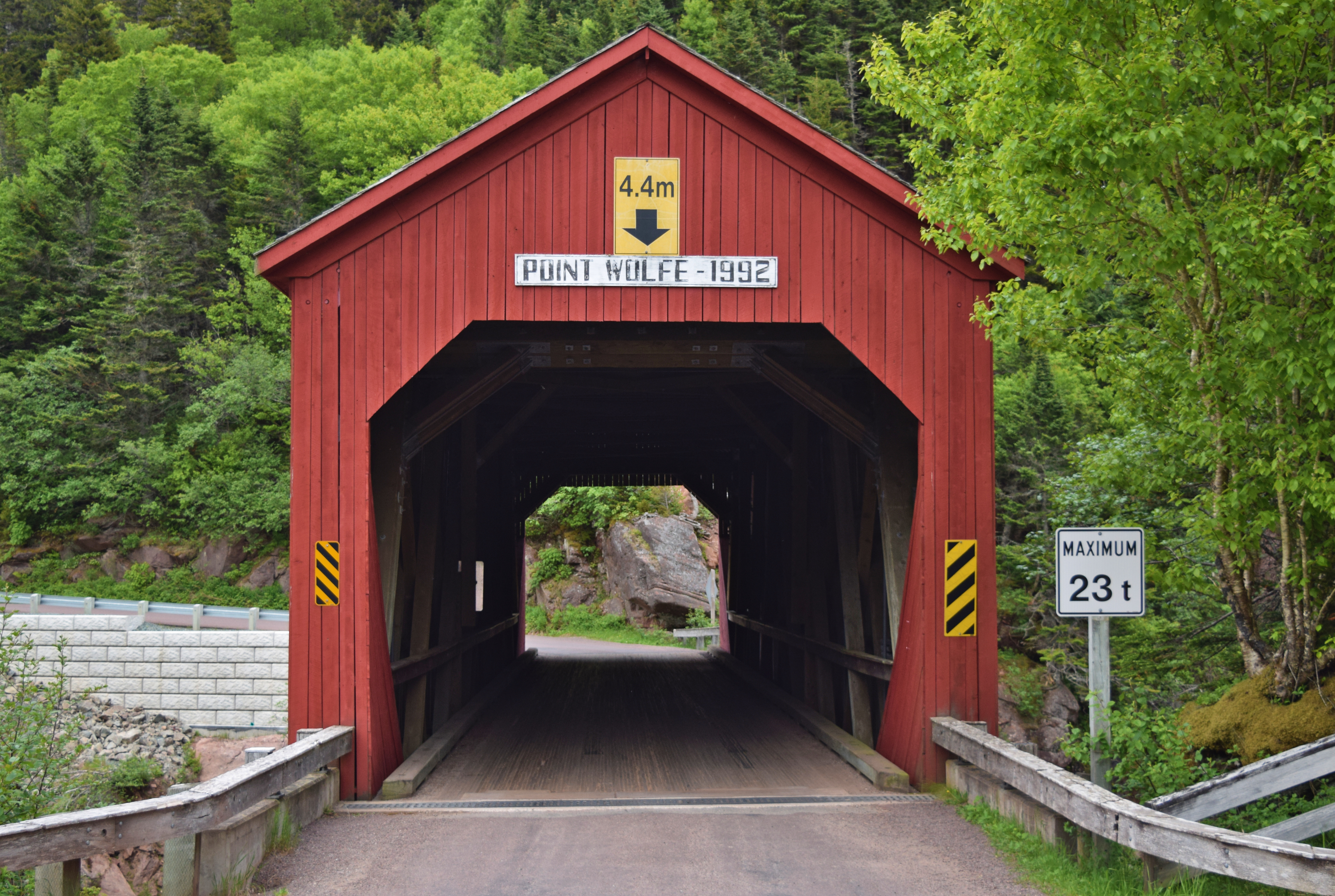
Point Wolfe covered bridge
