= Alma, New Brunswick =

Alma Salmon River Settlement
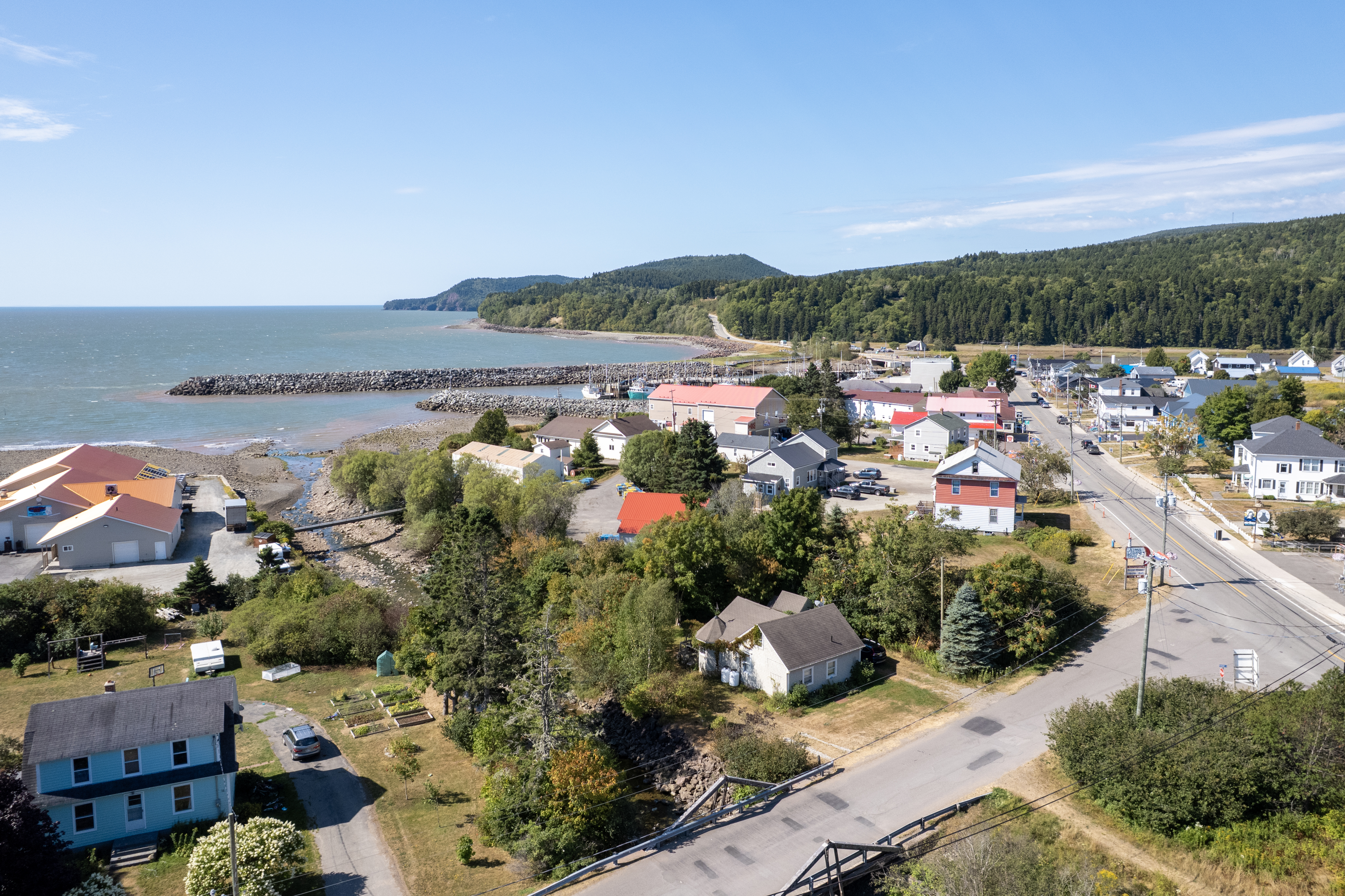

- Seal

- Location within New Brunswick
- Coordinates: 45°36′07″N 64°56′36″W
- Country: Canada
- Province: New Brunswick
- County: Albert
- Parish: Alma
- Municipality: Fundy Albert
- Incorporated: 1966
- Amalgamated: 2023

Area
  - Total: 47.64 km^{2} (18.39 sq mi)

Population (2021)
  - Total: 282
  - Density: 5.9/km^{2} (15/sq mi)
  - Change 2016–21: ▲32.4%

Electoral districts
  - Federal: Fundy Royal
  - Provincial: Albert
- Time zone: UTC-4 (EST)
  - Summer (DST): UTC-3 (EDT)
- Area codes: 506 and 428
- Website: www.villageofalma.ca

Alma is a disincorporated Village in Fundy Albert, New Brunswick, Canada. It resides in the territorial divisions of parish of Alma, Albert County. Alma is centered on the small delta of the Upper Salmon River and Cleveland Brook, where they empty into Salisbury Bay.

The headquarters of Fundy National Park is in Alma West, making tourism a major part of the local economy. Fishing, of lobster and scallops, is another primary economic activity.

== History ==
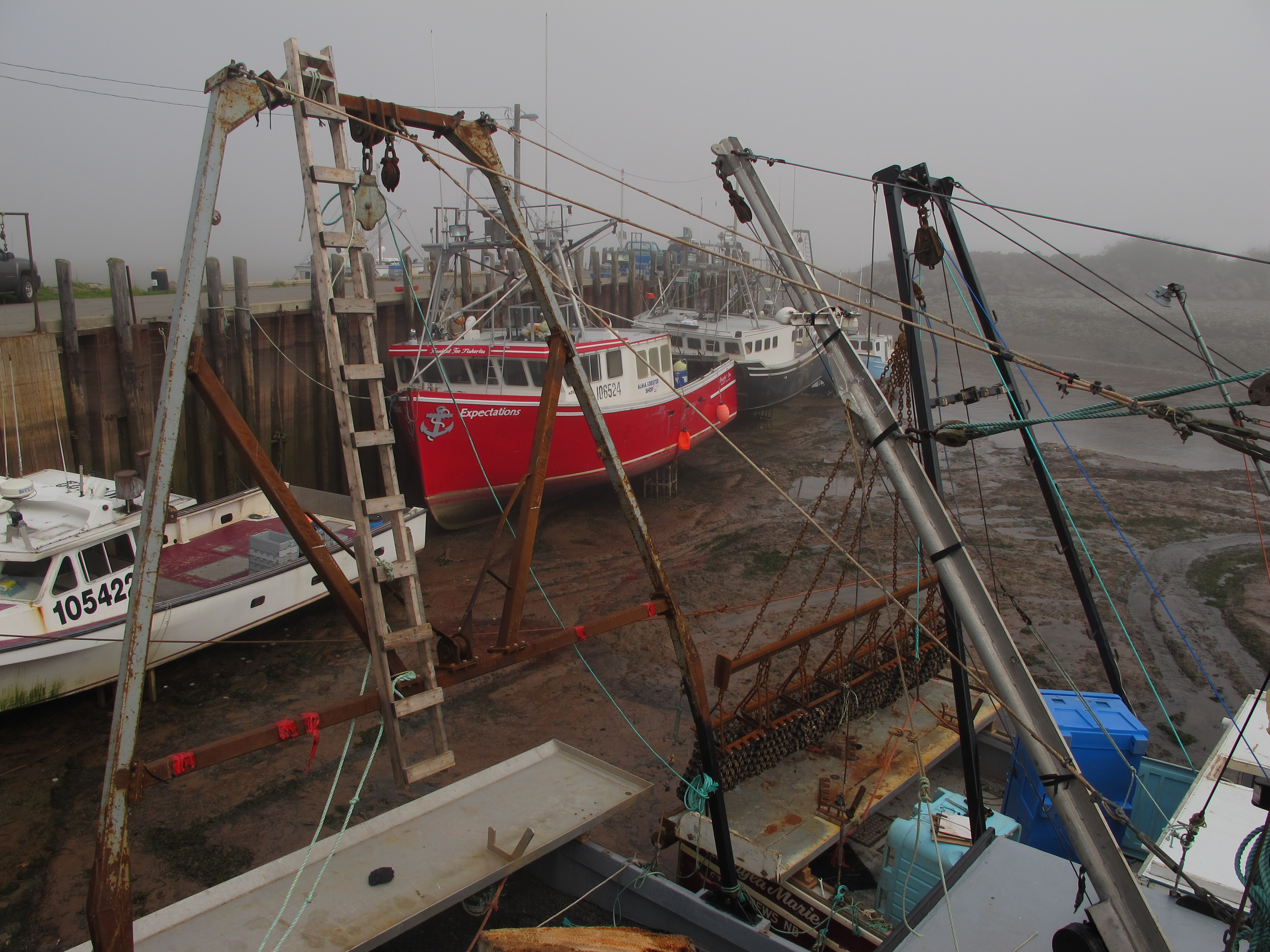
Low tide at Alma

The settlement, known as Salmon River Settlement, began in earnest as the lumbering trade took root with the exchange of land-grant title, and construction of a sawmill on the Upper Salmon River by its new owners. Prior to this, Loyalist John Coffin, who held the land grant, caused frustration for would-be settlers because of his absence. Thus began the most vibrant period in the community's history.

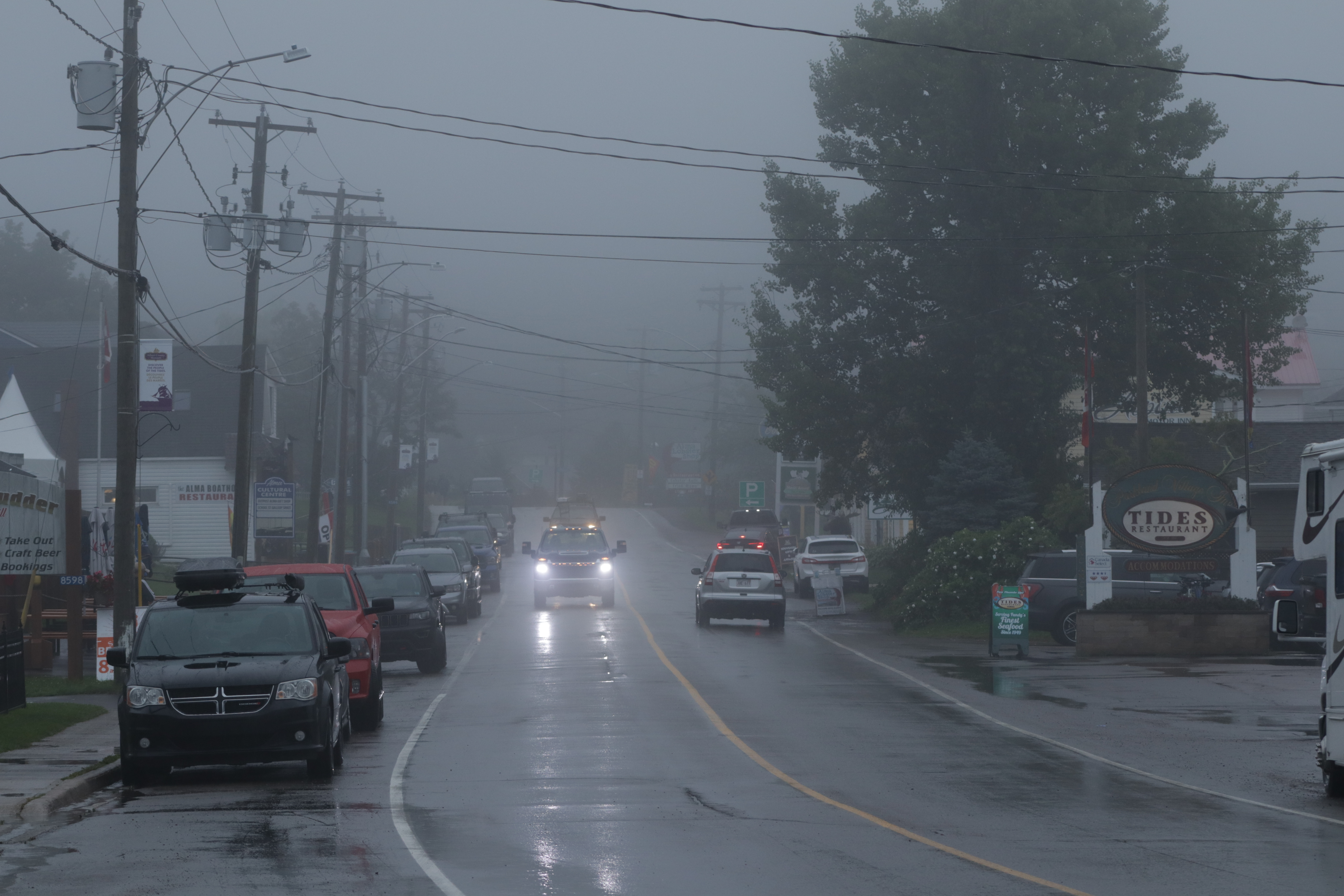
Alma's Main Street

The Parish of Alma was created surrounding the community in 1856, commemorating the then-recent Battle of Alma during the Crimean War. The Village municipality incorporated in 1966 following sweeping changes that disbanded county councils. 18 years earlier, the federal government had expropriated land in the village and parish west of the Upper Salmon River for the creation of Fundy National Park. Many homes were relocated east of the river as lumber barons gave way to the new land managers, the Parks Canada Agency. In addition to tourism related to the park, lobster and scallop fishing are an important industry based out of Alma's tidal harbour.

On 1 January 2023, Alma was amalgamated with the villages of Hillsborough and Riverside-Albert and parts of nine local service districts to form the municipal area called Fundy Albert. "Alma" continues to be the name of the former Village of Alma community.

== Demographics ==
In the 2021 Census of Population conducted by Statistics Canada, Alma had a population of 282 living in 130 of its 196 total private dwellings, a change of 32.4% from its 2016 population of 213. With a land area of 47.64 km^{2} (18.39 sq mi), it had a population density of 5.9/km^{2} (15.3/sq mi) in 2021. Revised census figures based on the 2023 local governance reforms have not been released.

== Notable people ==
Alma was the birthplace of Molly Kool, who in 1939 became Master Mariner for offshore sailing, a captain, a first in the Western World, sailing a commercial Bay of Fundy scow sloop between ports. A monument on the Alma waterfront marks her accomplishment.

== Images ==
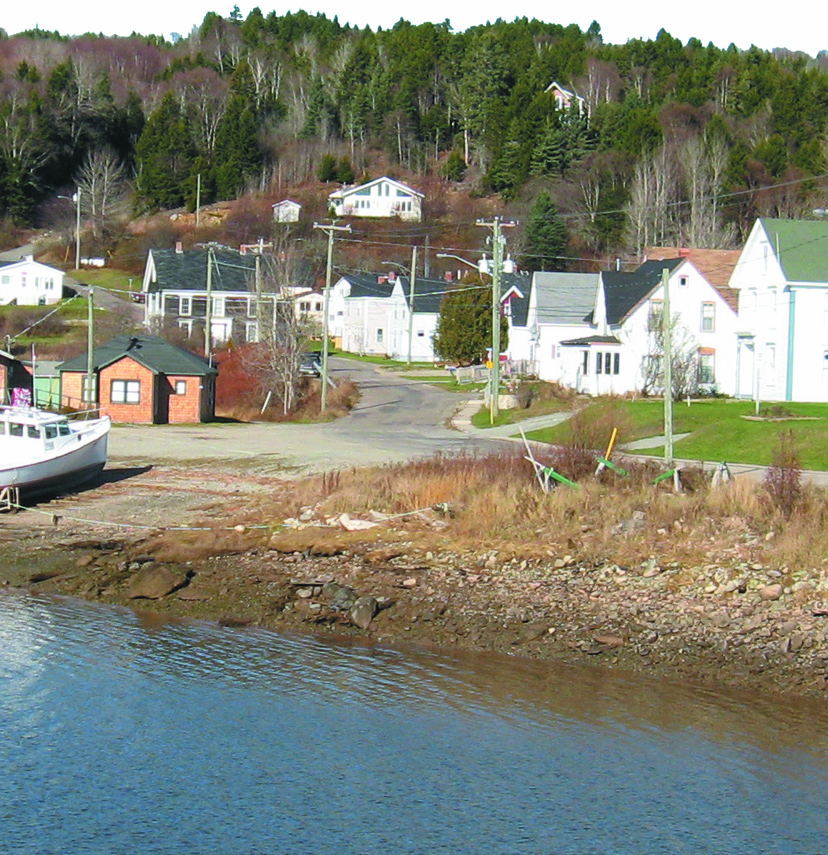
View from Alma Bridge.

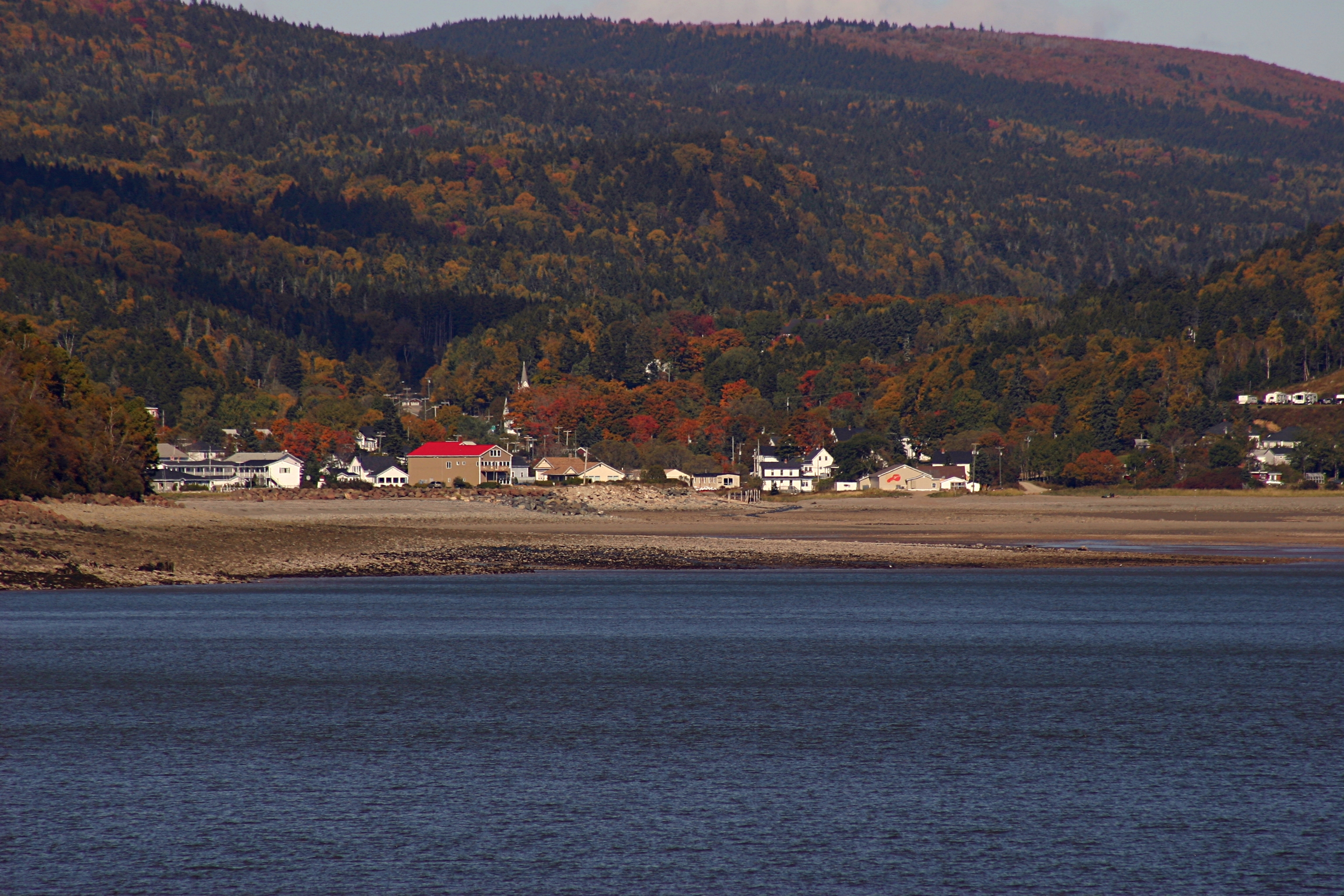
The village as viewed from the water

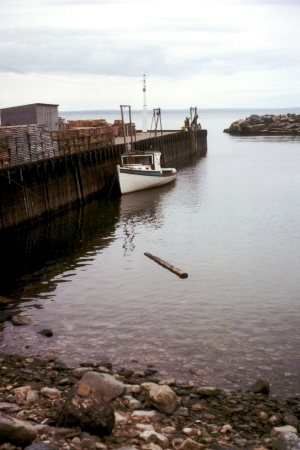
Harbour at high tide.

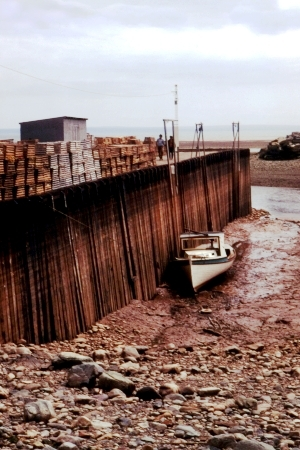
Harbour at low tide.

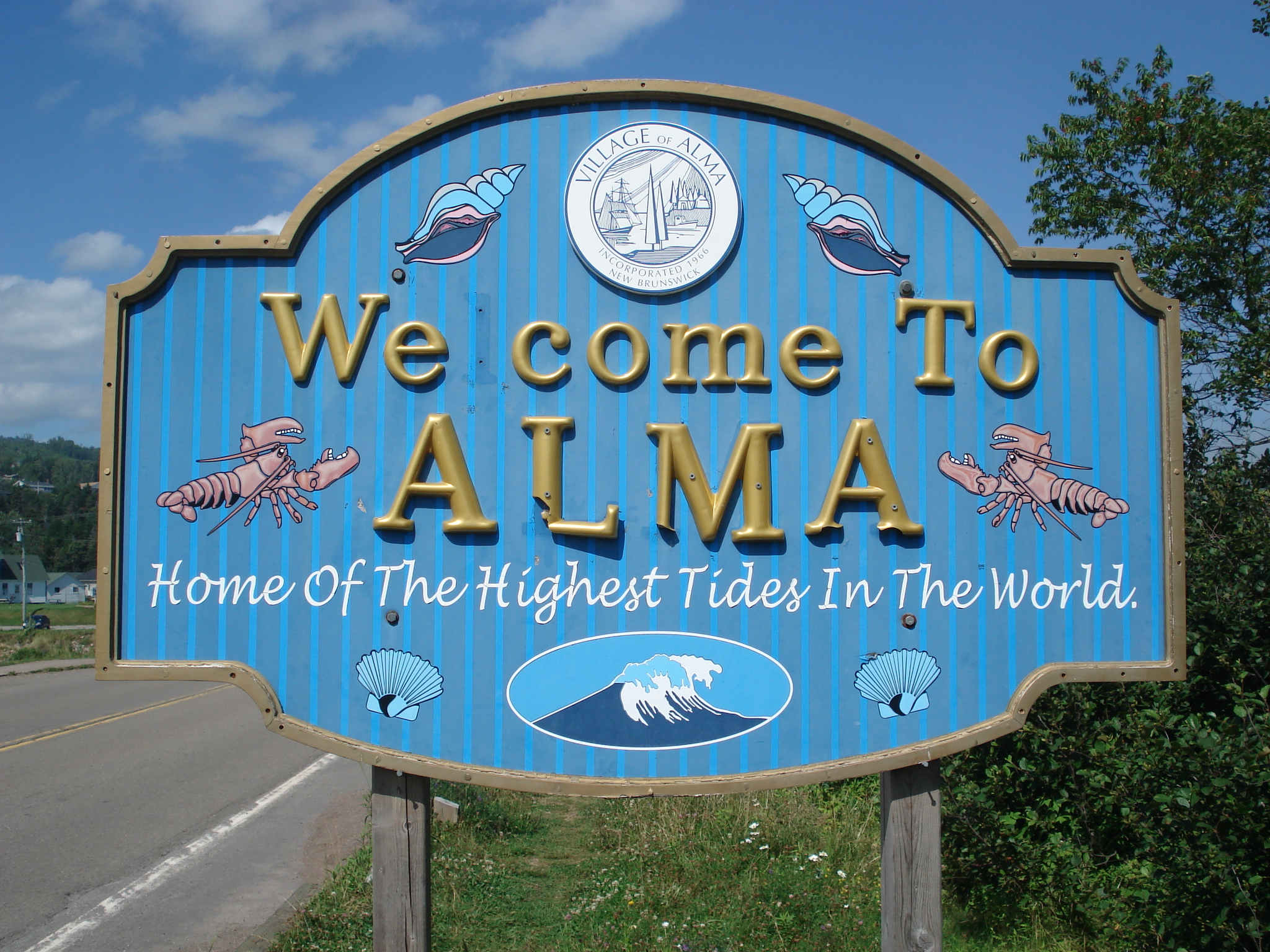
Sign at the entrance to the village.

== Climate ==
Alma has a relatively cool, wet and snowy maritime climate with significant seasonal differences in spite of its near-ocean location. Summers are warm but relatively short, whereas winters are relatively cold but milder than inland areas.

Climate data for Alma (1981−2010)
Month	Jan	Feb	Mar	Apr	May	Jun	Jul	Aug	Sep	Oct	Nov	Dec	Year
Record high °C (°F)	13.9 (57.0)	13.0 (55.4)	18.0 (64.4)	23.3 (73.9)	29.0 (84.2)	30.0 (86.0)	30.0 (86.0)	35.5 (95.9)	29.0 (84.2)	26.7 (80.1)	20.0 (68.0)	16.1 (61.0)	35.5 (95.9)
Mean daily maximum °C (°F)	−2.5 (27.5)	−1 (30)	2.7 (36.9)	8.4 (47.1)	14.4 (57.9)	18.9 (66.0)	22.1 (71.8)	22.0 (71.6)	18.4 (65.1)	12.6 (54.7)	6.9 (44.4)	1.1 (34.0)	10.3 (50.5)
Daily mean °C (°F)	−7.4 (18.7)	−6.1 (21.0)	−1.7 (28.9)	4.1 (39.4)	9.5 (49.1)	13.8 (56.8)	17.1 (62.8)	17.2 (63.0)	13.7 (56.7)	8.2 (46.8)	3.0 (37.4)	−3.3 (26.1)	5.7 (42.3)
Mean daily minimum °C (°F)	−12.3 (9.9)	−11.1 (12.0)	−6.2 (20.8)	−0.3 (31.5)	4.5 (40.1)	8.7 (47.7)	12.0 (53.6)	12.3 (54.1)	9.0 (48.2)	3.8 (38.8)	−0.9 (30.4)	−7.7 (18.1)	1.0 (33.8)
Record low °C (°F)	−31 (−24)	−30.6 (−23.1)	−25.6 (−14.1)	−14.5 (5.9)	−5.6 (21.9)	−0.6 (30.9)	3.0 (37.4)	2.2 (36.0)	−1.1 (30.0)	−9 (16)	−16.5 (2.3)	−28.5 (−19.3)	−31 (−24)
Average precipitation mm (inches)	144.9 (5.70)	107.8 (4.24)	145.8 (5.74)	120.7 (4.75)	126.5 (4.98)	110.0 (4.33)	99.4 (3.91)	93.9 (3.70)	122.7 (4.83)	132.9 (5.23)	158.9 (6.26)	146.6 (5.77)	1,510.1 (59.45)
Average rainfall mm (inches)	67.0 (2.64)	47.1 (1.85)	89.6 (3.53)	101.4 (3.99)	124.8 (4.91)	110.0 (4.33)	99.4 (3.91)	93.9 (3.70)	122.7 (4.83)	132.9 (5.23)	147.4 (5.80)	90.4 (3.56)	1,226.6 (48.29)
Average snowfall cm (inches)	79.2 (31.2)	55.1 (21.7)	54.0 (21.3)	18.2 (7.2)	1.7 (0.7)	0.0 (0.0)	0.0 (0.0)	0.0 (0.0)	0.0 (0.0)	0.0 (0.0)	11.7 (4.6)	55.3 (21.8)	275.1 (108.3)
Average precipitation days (≥ 0.2 mm)	15.0	12.4	14.7	15.0	16.0	14.6	13.9	12.4	12.9	14.2	15.2	15.2	171.5
Average rainy days (≥ 0.2 mm)	5.0	4.5	7.7	12.8	15.9	14.6	13.9	12.4	12.9	14.2	13.6	8.0	135.5
Average snowy days (≥ 0.2 cm)	11.2	9.4	8.7	3.5	0.12	0.0	0.0	0.0	0.0	0.0	2.2	8.3	43.4
Mean monthly sunshine hours	110.5	118.2	148.3	158.3	193.6	196.5	225.7	206.6	159.5	145.0	91.0	90.3	1,843.4
Percentage possible sunshine	39.0	40.4	40.2	39.1	41.9	41.9	47.6	47.2	42.3	42.6	31.8	33.2	40.6
Source: Environment Canada
