= The Amazing Race Canada 2 =

Season of television series

- Season 2
- Presented by: Jon Montgomery
- No. of teams: 11
- Winners: Mickey Henry & Peter Schmalz
- No. of legs: 12
- Distance traveled: 40,000 km (25,000 mi)
- No. of episodes: 12 (14 including reunions)

Release
- Original network: CTV
- Original release: July 8 – September 21, 2014

Additional information
- Filming dates: April 26 – May 22, 2014

Series chronology
- ← Previous; Season 1 Next → Season 3

The Amazing Race Canada 2 is the second season of The Amazing Race Canada, a Canadian reality competition show based on the American series The Amazing Race. Hosted by Jon Montgomery, it featured eleven teams of two, each with a pre-existing relationship, in a race across Canada and the world. The grand prize included a CA$250,000 cash payout, two Chevrolet Silverado "High Country Edition" trucks, free gasoline for life from Petro-Canada, and the ability to fly for free anywhere for a year with Air Canada. This season visited seven provinces, one territory, and two additional countries and travelled over 40,000 kilometres (25,000 mi) during twelve legs. Starting in Jasper National Park, racers travelled through Alberta, British Columbia, Hong Kong, Macau, the Yukon, Manitoba, France, Quebec, Prince Edward Island, New Brunswick, and Ontario before finishing in Ottawa. A new twist introduced in this season was international travel. The season premiered on CTV on July 8, 2014, with the season finale airing on September 21, 2014.

Best friends Michael Henry and Peter Schmalz were the winners of this season, while Canada women's national ice hockey teammates Natalie Spooner and Meaghan Mikkelson finished in second place, and bartenders and co-workers Ryan Steele and Rob Goddard finished in third place.

== Production ==
=== Development and filming ===
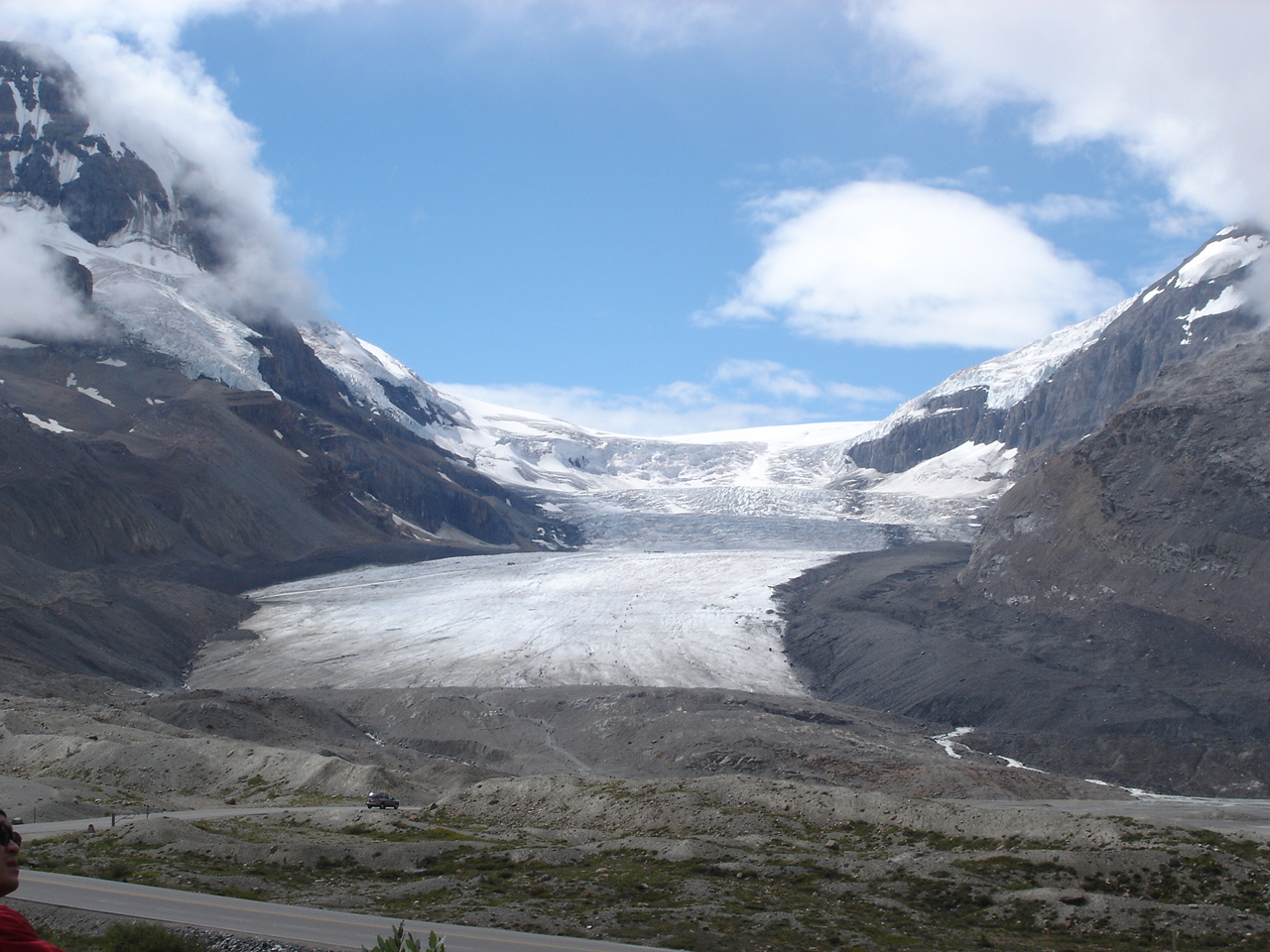
The starting line for the second season of The Amazing Race Canada was located near the Glacier Skywalk and the Columbia Icefield in Jasper National Park.

On September 16, 2013, CTV announced that the show was renewed for the second season during the first season's reunion special.

Filming for this season began on April 26, 2014. Unlike the first season, this season travelled to destinations outside of Canada. Teams were spotted in Hong Kong in early May 2014.

=== Casting ===
Casting began in November 2013, with an online site for submission of applications and audition videos.

=== Marketing ===
Air Canada and Chevrolet retained their sponsorship from the first season. New prizes included a gas supply from Petro-Canada and each cash from Scotiabank.

=== Broadcasting ===
After episode 6, a special mid-season reunion/recap, entitled "After the Race," aired. Hosted by James Duthie, the program reviewed the events of the first six episodes with the first five eliminated teams. A second "After the Race" special, again hosted by Duthie, aired immediately after the season finale with all the teams present.

== Cast ==
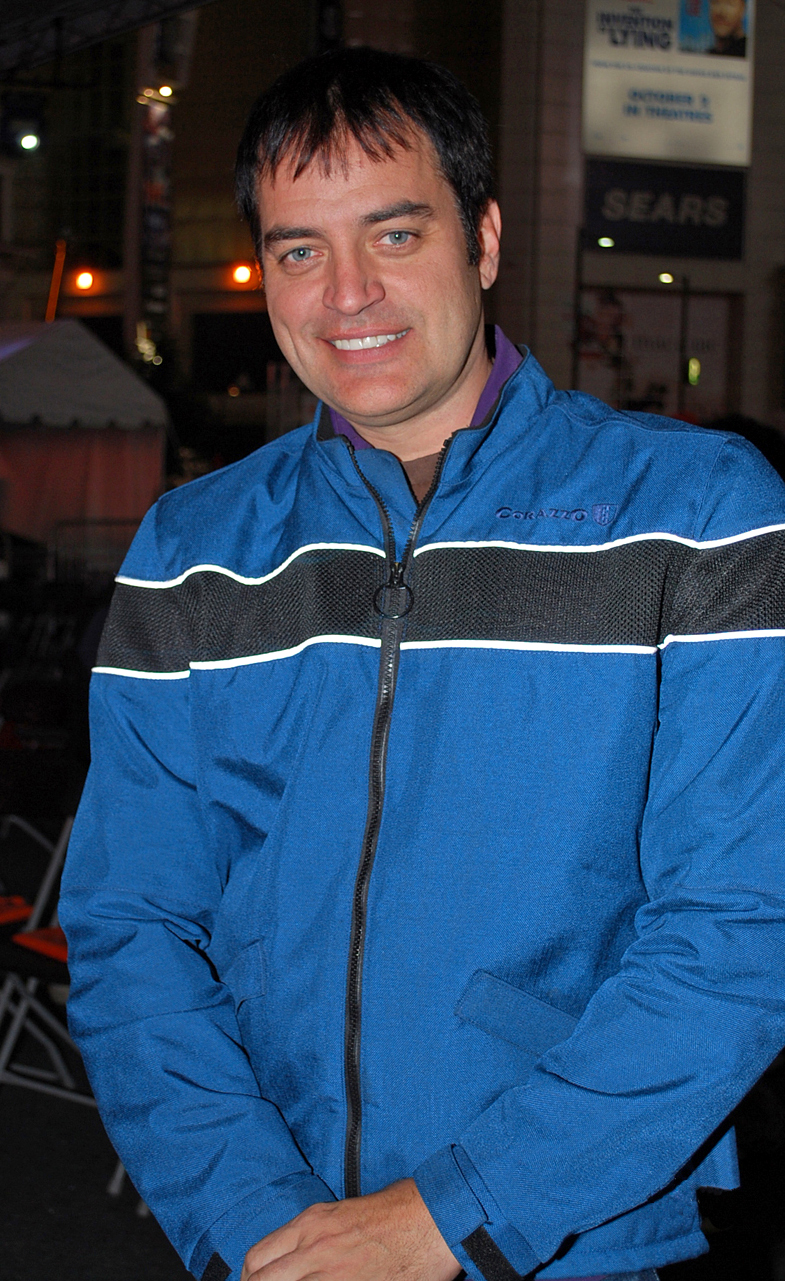
Rex Harrington

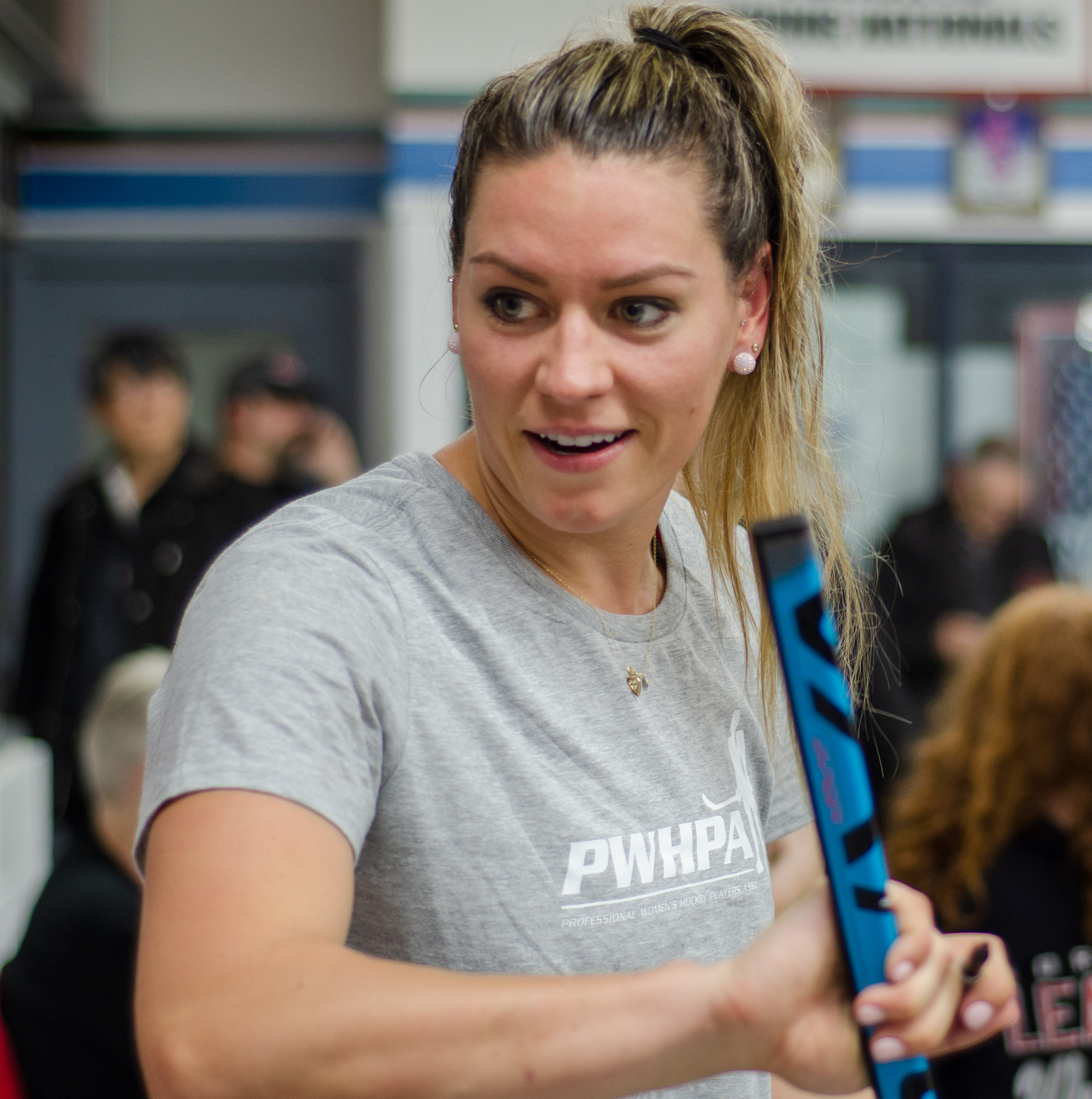
Natalie Spooner

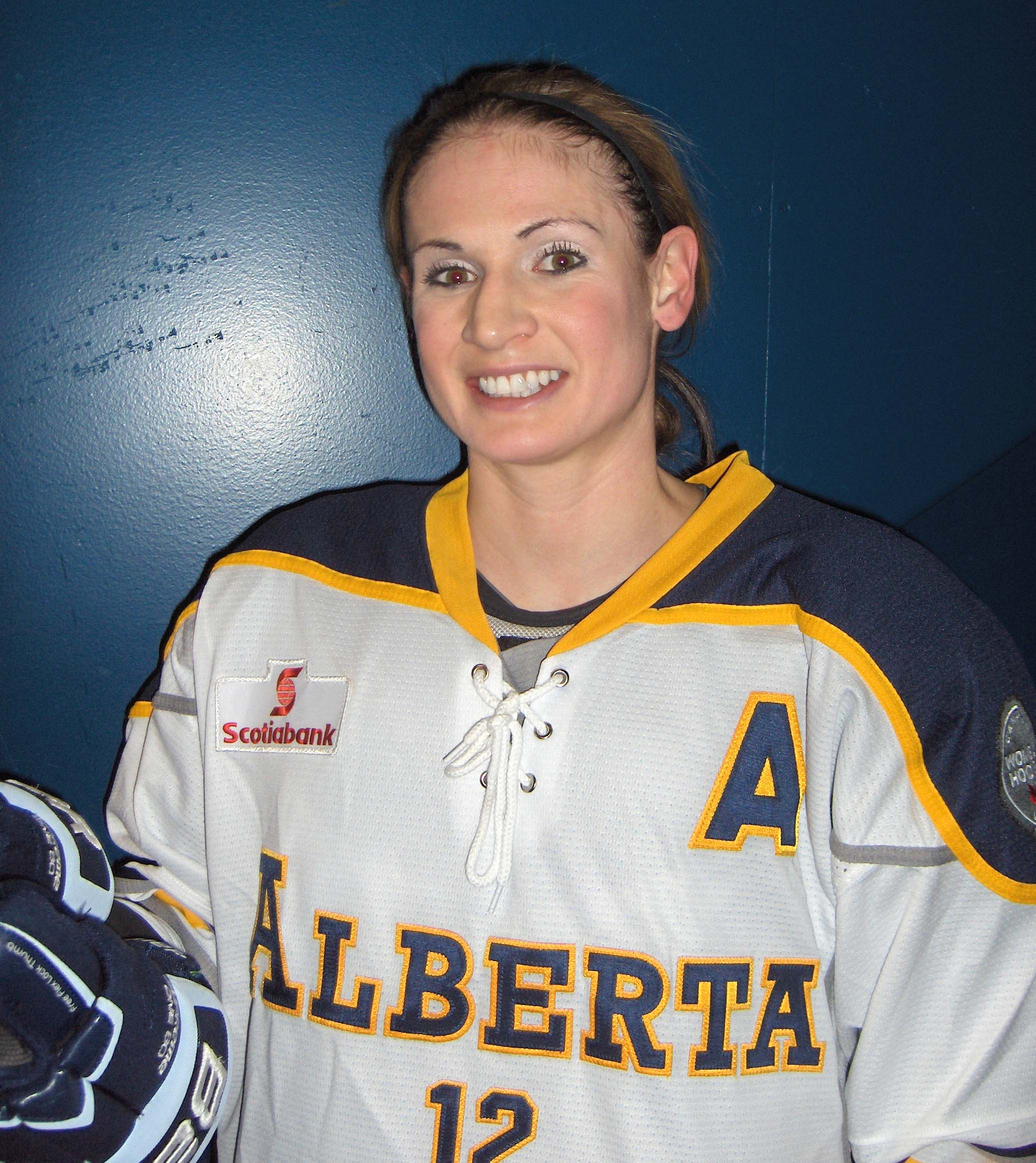
Meaghan Mikkelson

The first three teams were revealed on June 17, 2014, with the remaining teams announced on June 18 and June 20. The contestants included ice hockey players and gold medalists Natalie Spooner and Meaghan Mikkelson, ballet dancer Rex Harrington, and comedian Ryan Steele. Alain Chanoine proposed to Audrey Tousignant-Maurice at the Pit Stop of Leg 8, and she accepted.

Contestants	Age	Relationship	Hometown	Status
Shahla Kara	29	Childhood Friends	Markham, Ontario	Eliminated 1st (in Colwood, British Columbia)
Nabeela Barday	29	Childhood Friends	Markham, Ontario	Eliminated 1st (in Colwood, British Columbia)
Jen King	40	Married	Halifax, Nova Scotia	Withdrew (in Tofino, British Columbia)
Shawn King	41	Married	Halifax, Nova Scotia	Withdrew (in Tofino, British Columbia)
Laura Takahashi	28	Married	Toronto, Ontario	Eliminated 3rd (in Kowloon City, Hong Kong)
Jackie Skinner	31	Married	Toronto, Ontario	Eliminated 3rd (in Kowloon City, Hong Kong)
Cormac Foster	19	Mother & Son	Winnipeg, Manitoba	Eliminated 4th (in Whitehorse, Yukon)
Nicole Foster	39	Mother & Son	Winnipeg, Manitoba	Eliminated 4th (in Whitehorse, Yukon)
Rex Harrington	51	Engaged	Ashburn, Ontario	Eliminated 5th (in Winnipeg, Manitoba)
Bob Hope	47	Engaged	Ashburn, Ontario	Eliminated 5th (in Winnipeg, Manitoba)
Pierre Forget	42	Twin Brothers	Terrebonne, Quebec	Eliminated 6th (in Paris, France)
Michel Forget	42	Twin Brothers	Terrebonne, Quebec	Eliminated 6th (in Paris, France)
Alain Chanoine	32	Dating (Legs 1−8); Engaged (Legs 8−10)	Saint-Hubert, Quebec	Eliminated 7th (in North Rustico, Prince Edward Island)
Audrey Tousignant-Maurice	31	Dating (Legs 1−8); Engaged (Legs 8−10)	Saint-Hubert, Quebec	Eliminated 7th (in North Rustico, Prince Edward Island)
Sukhi Atwal	32	Siblings	Terrace, British Columbia	Eliminated 8th (in Cape Enrage, New Brunswick)
Jinder Atwal	26	Siblings	Terrace, British Columbia	Eliminated 8th (in Cape Enrage, New Brunswick)
Ryan Steele	36	Bartenders/Co-Workers	Vancouver, British Columbia	Third place
Rob Goddard	24	Bartenders/Co-Workers	Vancouver, British Columbia	Third place
Natalie Spooner	23	Teammates	Toronto, Ontario	Runners-up
Meaghan Mikkelson	29	Teammates	Calgary, Alberta	Runners-up
Mickey Henry	24	Best Friends	Seguin, Ontario	Winners
Pete Schmalz	24	Best Friends	Parry Sound, Ontario	Winners

=== Future appearances ===
In 2023, Mickey Henry competed on the first season of The Traitors Canada.

== Results ==
The following teams are listed with their placements in each leg. Placements are listed in finishing order.

- A red placement with a dagger (†) indicates that the team was eliminated.
- An underlined blue placement with a double-dagger (‡) indicates that the team was the last to arrive at a Pit Stop in a non-elimination leg, and had to perform a Speed Bump task in the following leg.
- An italicized and underlined placement indicates that the team was the last to arrive at a Pit Stop, but there was no rest period at the Pit Stop and all teams were instructed to continue racing.
- A green ƒ indicates that the team won the Fast Forward.
- A purple ε indicates that the team used an Express Pass on that leg to bypass one of their tasks.
- A brown ⊃ indicates that the team used the U-Turn and a brown ⊂ indicates the team on the receiving end of the U-Turn.

Team placement (by leg)
Team	1	2	3	4	5	6	7	8	9	10	11	12
Mickey & Pete	7th	3rd	5th	6th	6th	3rd	3rd	3rd	2nd	3rd	2nd	1st
Natalie & Meaghan	1st	1st	1stε (Note: This team used their Express Pass to bypass one of the tasks on this leg.)	1st	3rd	5th	1st	1st	3rd	2nd	1st	2nd
Ryan & Rob	9th	7th	4th	2nd	2nd	6th	6th‡	5th⊂ (Note: Sukhi & Jinder chose to use the U-Turn on Ryan & Rob.)	5th‡	4th	3rd	3rd
Sukhi & Jinder	6th	6th	8th	8th‡	4th	4th	4th	2nd⊃	1stƒ (Note: This team won the Fast Forward on this leg.)	1st	4th†	
Alain & Audrey	2nd	2nd	6th	7th	1st	2ndƒ	5th	4th⊂ (Note: Pierre & Michel chose to use the U-Turn on Alain & Audrey.)	4th	5th†		
Pierre & Michel	8th	5th	3rd	5th	5th	1stε	2nd	6th†⊃				
Rex & Bob	3rd	9th (Note: Rex & Bob initially arrived 6th, but were issued two penalties totaling six hours: a 2-hour penalty for quitting the surfing task and a 4-hour penalty for quitting the Roadblock. Three teams checked in during this penalty time, dropping Rex & Bob to last.) (Note: Rex & Bob arrived last at the Pit Stop, but were not eliminated on account of Jen & Shawn having withdrawn from the race.)	7th	3rd	7th	7th†						
Cormac & Nicole	4th	4th	2nd	4th	8th†							
Laura & Jackie	5th	8th	9th†									
Jen & Shawn	10th	† (Note: Jen & Shawn chose to withdraw from the race after Shawn dislocated his shoulder.)										
Shahla & Nabeela	11th†											

== Race summary ==
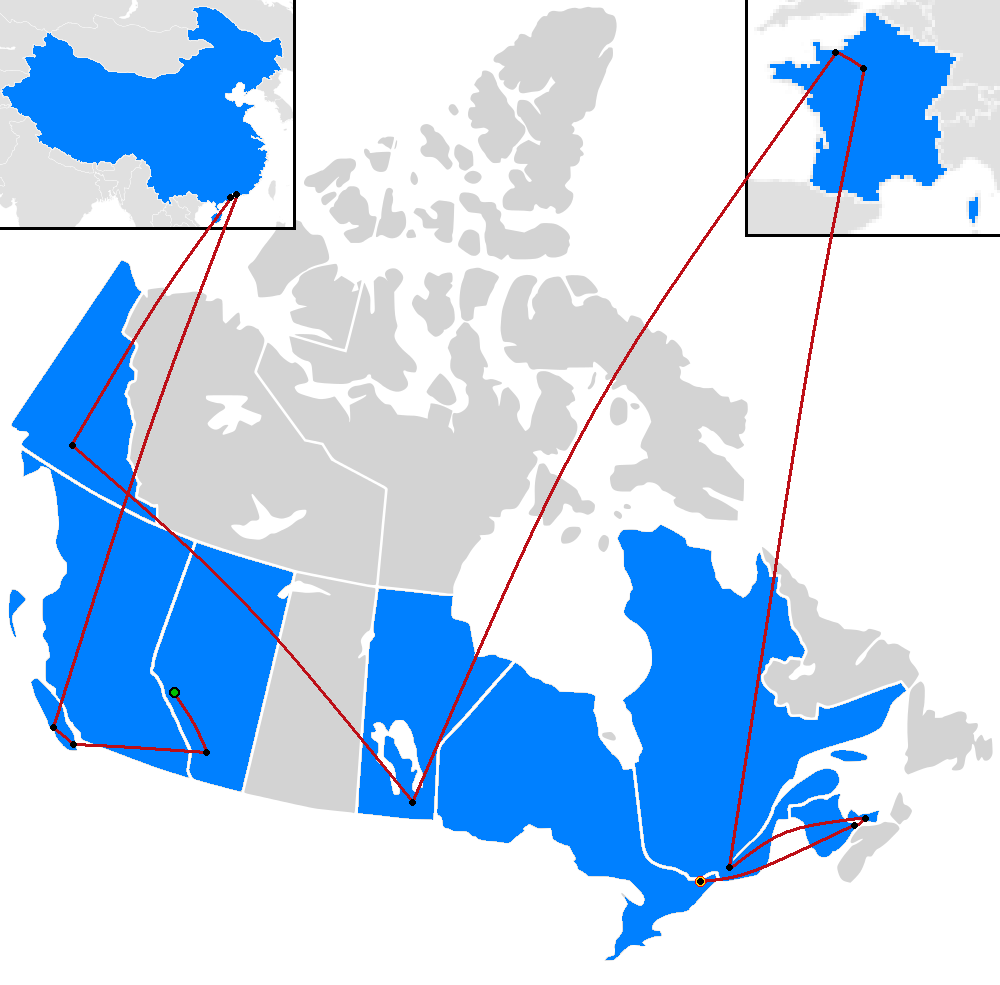
The complete route map of The Amazing Race Canada 2.

Destinations	Air travel Rail travel Water travel Bus travel Helicopter travel Bicycle travel Gondola travel
Route Markers	Detour Roadblock Fast Forward U-Turn Speed Bump Pit Stop

=== Leg 1 (Alberta → British Columbia) ===
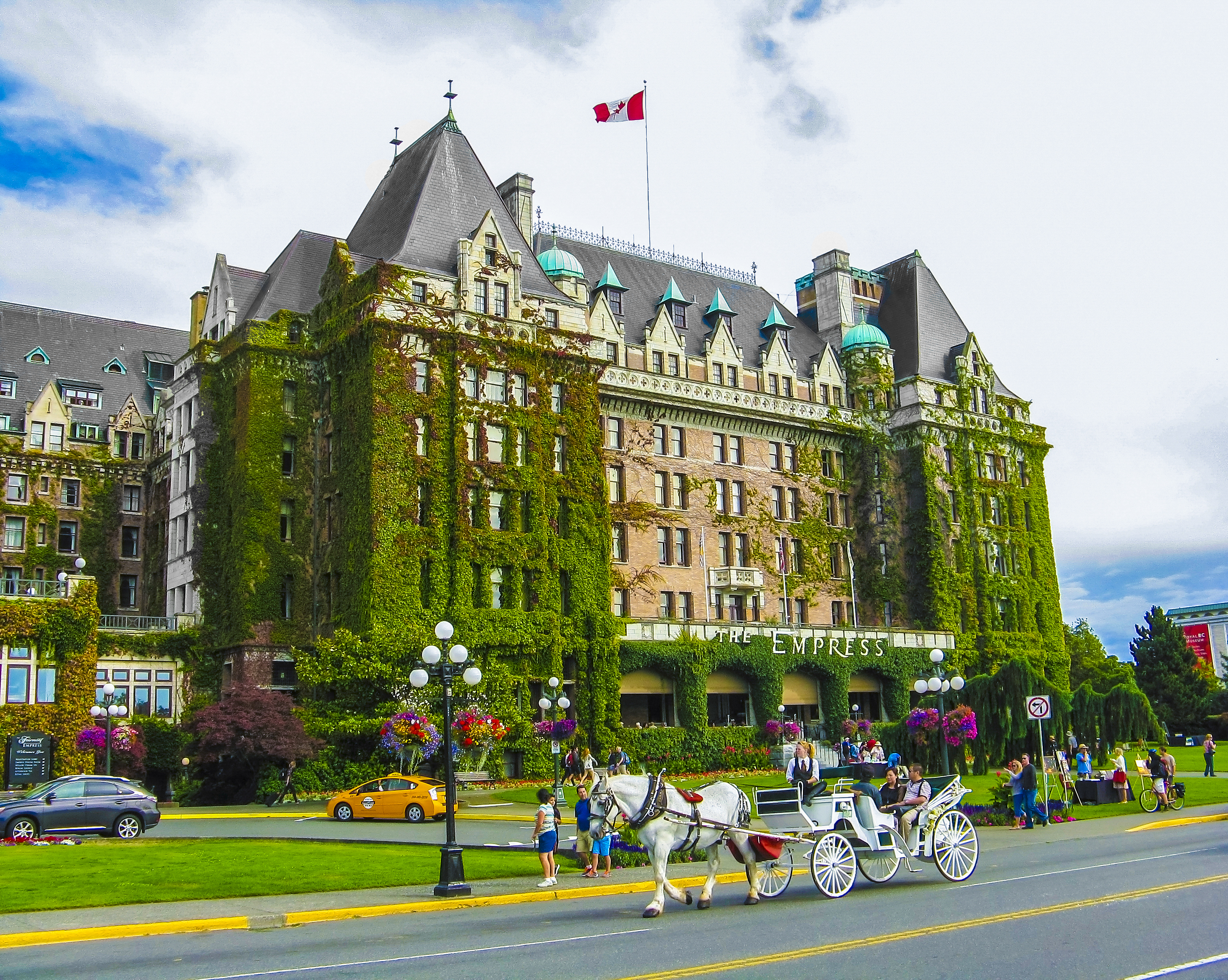
In Victoria, British Columbia, the second Roadblock had racers serving afternoon tea at The Fairmont Empress.

- Episode 1: "What Does It Take to Get a Cup of Tea Around Here?" (July 8, 2014)
- Prizes: Two round-trip tickets to any South American destination served by Air Canada, CA$2,000, and two Express Passes (awarded to Natalie & Meaghan)
- Eliminated: Shahla & Nabeela

Locations

- Jasper National Park, Alberta (Columbia Icefield) (Starting Line)
- Calgary (WinSport Canada Olympic Park – Frank King Day Lodge)
- Calgary (Calgary International Airport) → Victoria, British Columbia
- Sidney (Victoria International Airport – Totem Poles) (Unaired)
- Sidney (Viscount Aero Centre)
- Victoria (Willows Beach)
- Victoria (The Fairmont Empress)
- Victoria → Colwood (CFB Esquimalt – Damage Control Training Facility Galiano)
- Colwood (Fisgard Lighthouse)

Episode summary

- Teams began from the Columbia Icefield before driving to WinSport Canada Olympic Park, which had their next clue. Teams then had to take an elevator to the top of a 90-metre (300 ft) ski jump and then ride North America's fastest zipline, "The Monster", to receive their next clue from Olympian Helen Upperton. Teams were instructed to travel to Victoria, British Columbia, on one of three flights each departing one hour apart, and also received a Scotiabank American Express card that would serve as their source of money for the rest of the race.
- At the Viscount Aero Centre, teams had to search a vintage 1930's Fleet Model 10D biplane for their first Roadblock clue.
- In this season's first Roadblock, one team member had to tandem skydive 12,000 feet (3,700 m) with an instructor onto Willows Beach, where they reunited with their partner before receiving their next clue.
- After the first Roadblock, teams had to travel to The Fairmont Empress and search for their next clue by an Arbutus tree.
- In this leg's second Roadblock, the team member who did not perform the previous Roadblock had to receive an etiquette lesson from hotel staff before serving afternoon tea to the patrons at The Fairmont Empress and reciting the menu options from memory in order to receive their next clue.
- After the second Roadblock, teams had to travel by Royal Canadian Navy rigid inflatable boat to CFB Esquimalt and complete two disaster training exercises. First, teams had to use a hose to knock down three weighted buckets in 30 seconds and then suppress a simulated helicopter fire in order to retrieve a casualty, which was unaired. Then, teams had to stop a simulated flooding ship from "sinking" by plugging nine gaps in the ship's hull in order to receive their next clue directing them to the Pit Stop: Fisgard Lighthouse in Colwood.

Additional note

- Once in Victoria, teams had to search outside the airport for totem poles in order to find their next clue. This segment was unaired.

=== Leg 2 (British Columbia) ===
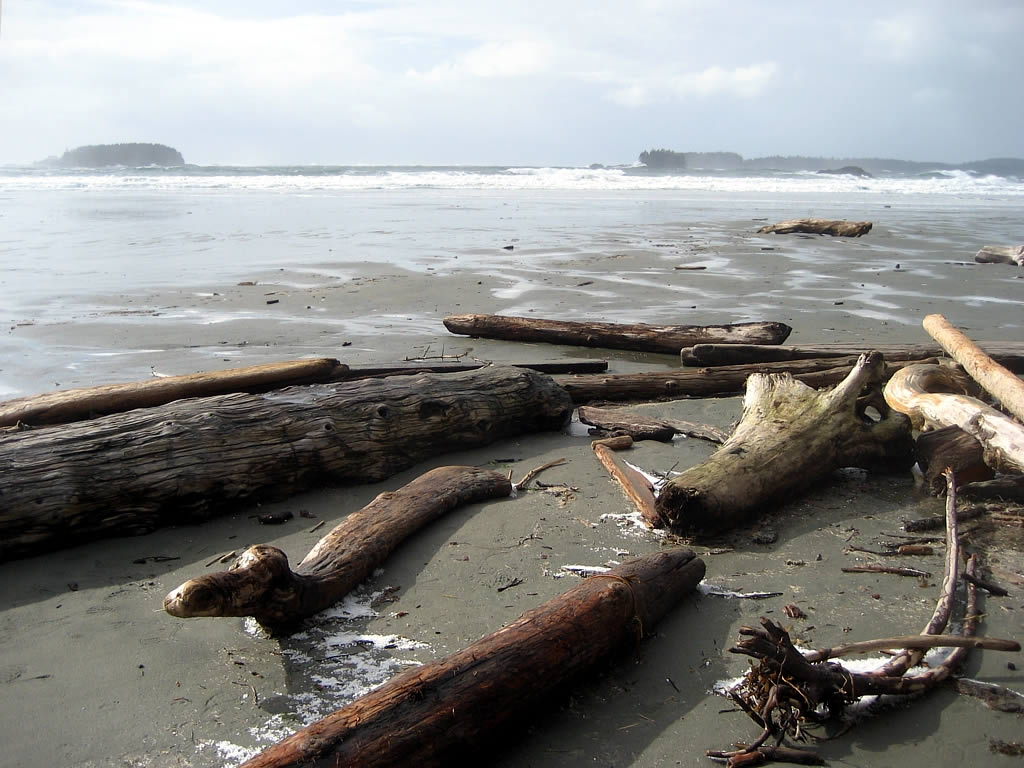
On South Chesterman Beach, racers had to use driftwood to construct a traditional Tofino deckchair.

- Episode 2: "There's a Fish in My Pants" (July 15, 2014)
- Prizes: Two round-trip tickets to Hong Kong and CA$2,000 (awarded to Natalie & Meaghan)
- Withdrew: Jen & Shawn

Locations

- Victoria (The Fairmont Empress)
- Victoria (Victoria International Airport) → Tofino
- Tofino (Wickaninnish Beach)
- Ucluelet (Ucluelet Harbour Seafoods)
- Tofino (North Chesterman Beach – Surf Shack)
- Tofino (South Chesterman Beach)
- Tofino (Olsen Road – Crab Dock)

Episode summary

- At the start of this leg, teams were instructed to travel on one of three flights to Tofino. Once there, team had to drive to Wickaninnish Beach, which had their next clue.
- This season's first Detour was a choice between Sharp Knives or Sharp Eyes. Both Detour options required teams to drive to Ucluelet Harbour. In Sharp Knives, teams had to watch a demonstration and then correctly fillet at least 30 pounds (14 kg) of rockfish in order to receive their next clue. Teams had a limited amount of fish. If teams ran out without reaching the target weight, they had to switch Detour options or receive a penalty. In Sharp Eyes, teams had to sort through 1,000 pounds (450 kg) of assorted Pacific rockfish and separate them into five bins in order to receive their next clue.
- After the Detour, teams had to drive to North Chesterman Beach and find the surf shack with their next clue. Teams then had to change into wetsuits and then ride from the surf shack to the beach on bicycles with a surfboard. Once at the beach, one team member had to surf a wave for at least three seconds while their partner videoed their effort in order to receive their next clue.
- In this leg's Roadblock, one team member had to use driftwood and fishing nets to construct a traditional Tofino beach chair that could hold the judge's weight in order to receive their next clue directing them to the Pit Stop: the crab dock on Olsen Road.

Additional notes

- Surfer Mathea Olin appeared as the Pit Stop greeter for this leg.
- Shawn dislocated his shoulder during the surfing challenge. After a hospital visit, Jen & Shawn chose to withdraw from the race.

=== Leg 3 (British Columbia → Hong Kong) ===
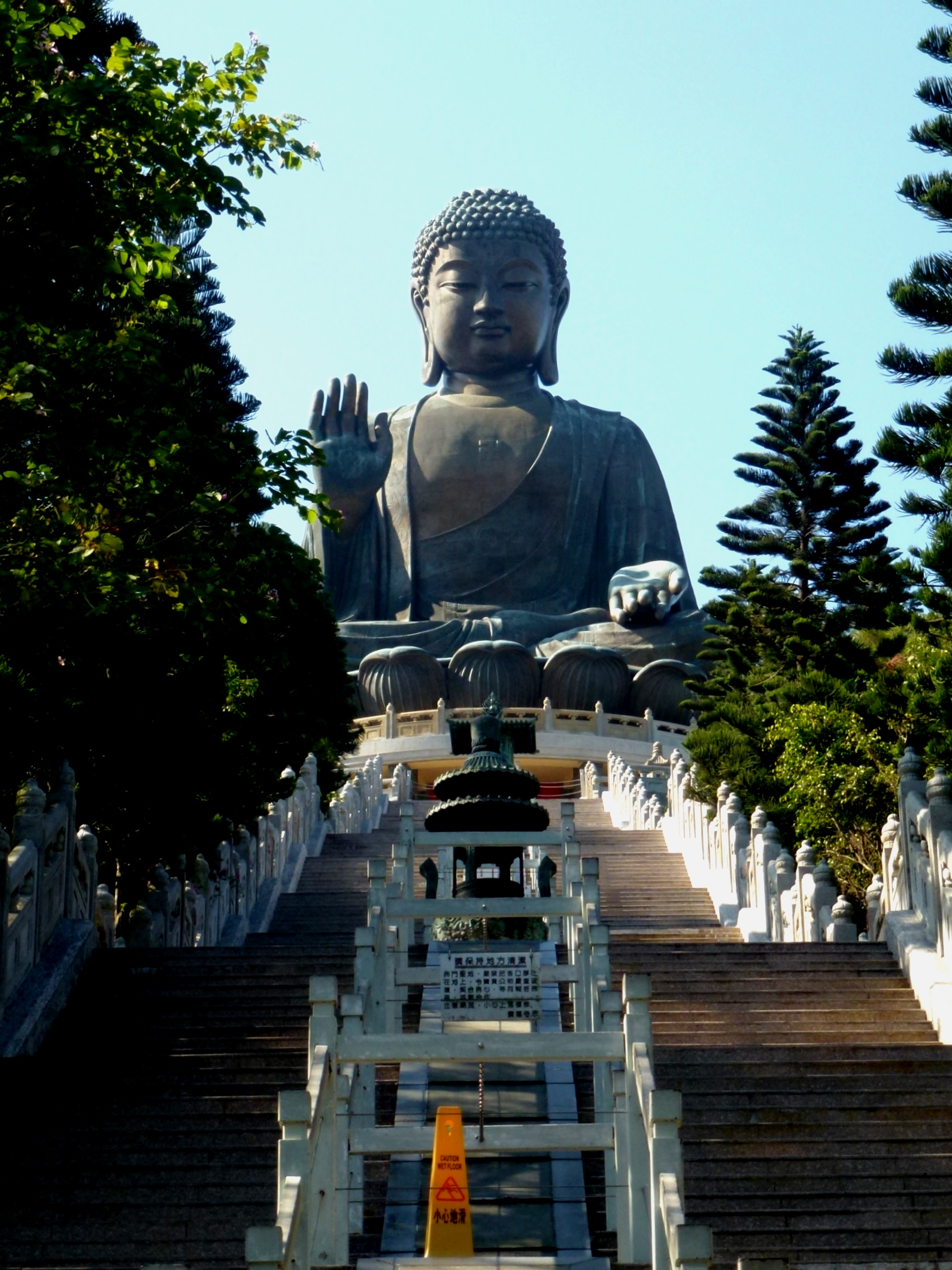
After arriving in Hong Kong, teams had to climb up 268 steps to the Tian Tan Buddha in Ngong Ping.

- Episode 3: "Snakes and Liars" (July 22, 2014)
- Prizes: Two round-trip tickets to any Chinese destination served by Air Canada and CA$2,000 (awarded to Natalie & Meaghan)
- Eliminated: Laura & Jackie

Locations

- Tofino (Pacific Rim National Park Reserve)
- Vancouver → Hong Kong
- Hong Kong (Tung Chung → Ngong Ping)
- Hong Kong (Ngong Ping Village)
- Hong Kong (Tian Tan Buddha)
- Hong Kong (Golden Dragon Statue)
- Hong Kong (Bo Innovation & Wan Chai Wet Market or Old Wan Chai Swimming Pool Platform)
- Hong Kong (Canal Road Flyover) (Unaired)
- Hong Kong (She Wong Lam Snake Restaurant)
- Hong Kong (Avenue of Stars – Statue of Bruce Lee)
- Hong Kong (Kowloon Walled City Park)

Episode summary

- At the start of this leg, teams were instructed to fly to Hong Kong. Once there, teams had to travel by cable car to Ngong Ping. After teams got off the cable car, they had to sign up for a morning blessing. The next day, teams were blessed by the monks before climbing up to the Tian Tan Buddha, where they found their next clue directing them to the Golden Dragon Statue.
- This leg's Detour was a choice between Master Chef or Kung Fu Master. In Master Chef, teams had to go to Bo Innovation, where they found MasterChef Canada judge Alvin Leung, who handed them a shopping list of ten items. Teams then had to go to Wan Chai Wet Market to purchase the items. Once Leung confirmed that teams bought the correct items, he handed them their next clue. In Kung Fu Master, teams had to suit up in a traditional martial arts uniform and then perform a difficult kung fu routine to the satisfaction of the kung fu master in order to receive their next clue. Natalie & Meaghan used their Express Pass to bypass this Detour.
- After the Detour, teams travelled to the Canal Road Flyover, which went unaired, and then found their next clue at She Wong Lam Snake Restaurant.
- In this leg's Roadblock, one team member was greeted by a snake master, who chose a serpent to show them. The master then took out the snake's gallbladder and the team member had to drink a shot of the snake's bile. They then had to consume a bowl of snake meat soup in order to receive their next clue.
- After the Roadblock, teams had to strike a series of poses, including the famous Bruce Lee pose, for a local film director at the Statue of Bruce Lee in order to receive their next clue directing them to the Pit Stop: Kowloon Walled City Park.

Additional note

- Hong Kong-Canadian actress Jennifer Tse appeared as the Pit Stop greeter for this leg.

=== Leg 4 (Hong Kong → Macau) ===
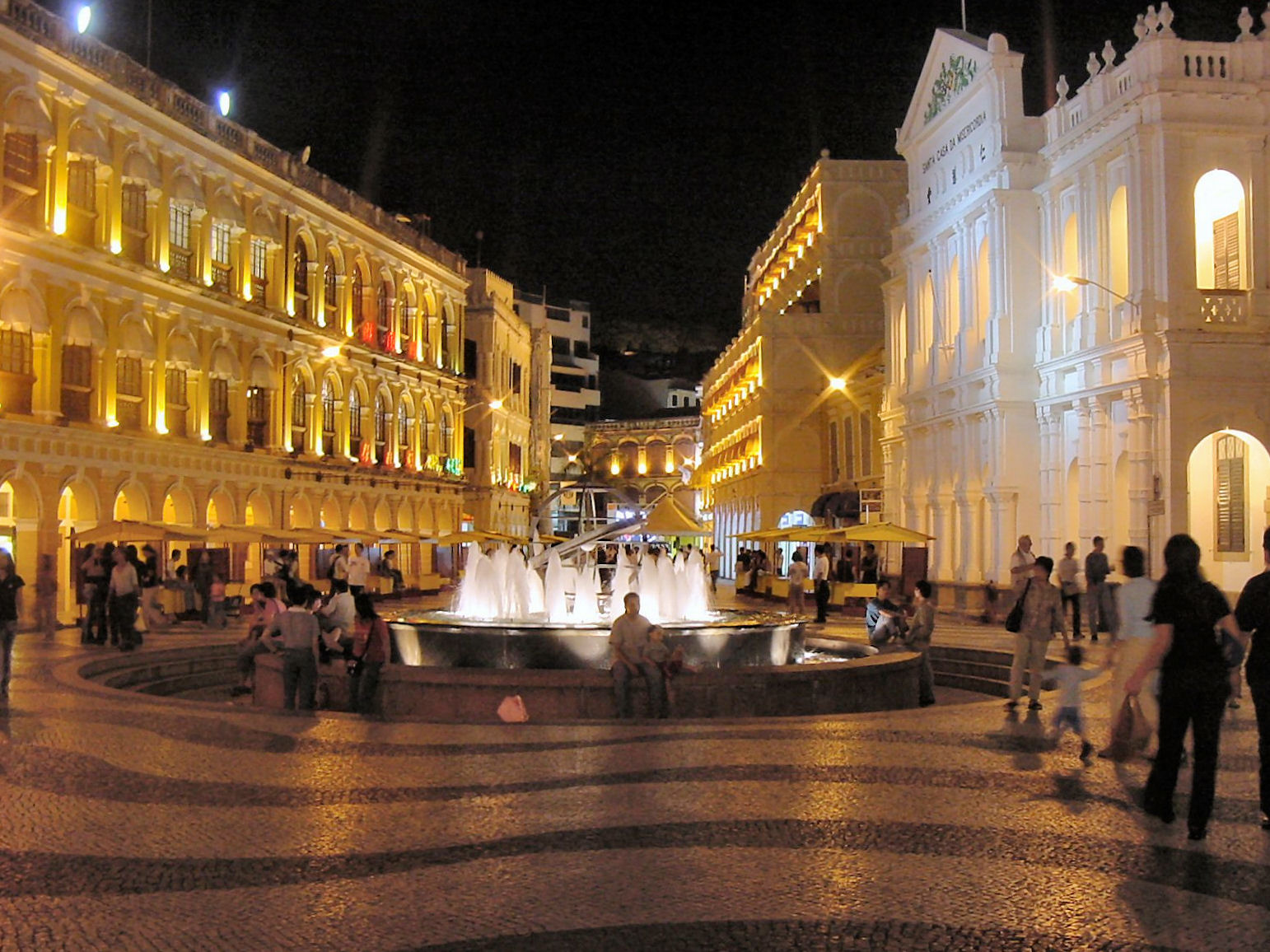
At Senado Square in Macau, one side of the Detour required teams to learn a Macanese folk dance.

- Episode 4: "They're Harshing Our Mellow" (July 29, 2014)
- Prizes: Two round-trip tickets to Tokyo, Japan, and CA$3,000 (awarded to Natalie & Meaghan)

Locations

- Hong Kong (Shantung Street)
- Hong Kong (Hong Kong–Macau Ferry Terminal) → Macau
- Macau (A-Ma Temple)
- Macau (Macau Tower)
- Macau (Almond Biscuit Store)
- Macau (Ruins of Saint Paul's or Senado Square)
- Macau (Grand Lapa Macau)
- Macau (Grand Lisboa)
- Macau (Praça de Ferreira do Amaral)

Episode summary

- At the start of this leg, teams were instructed to travel to the Hong Kong–Macau Ferry Terminal and sign up for one of two ferries to Macau, each with room for four teams and departing thirty minutes apart. Once there, teams had to travel to the A-Ma Temple and perform an ancient ceremony meant to ward off evil spirits – lighting firecrackers – in order to receive their next clue, which directed them to the base of the Macau Tower.
- In this leg's Roadblock, one team member had to perform the world's highest bungee jump from a height of 764 feet (233 m) atop the Macau Tower in order to receive their next clue.
- After the Roadblock, teams had to search Rua da Felicidade for an almond biscuit store, which had their next clue.
- This leg's Detour was a choice between Stamp It or Stomp It. In Stamp It, teams had to travel to the Ruins of Saint Paul's, where they had to pick up a scroll. They then had to search the streets around Senado Square for six shrines, each marked with one of six ancient Chinese symbols. At each station, they had to mark their scroll with a stamp in ink. Once teams returned to the ruins with all six stamps on their scroll, they received their next clue. In Stomp It, teams had to head to Senado Square, join a Macanese folk dance troupe, and perform a complicated routine in order to receive their next clue.
- After the Detour, teams had to correctly deal a game of Fan-Tan at the Grand Lapa hotel's casino in order to receive their next clue, which directed them to travel to the Grand Lisboa and search through a series of underground passageways to find their next Pit Stop: Praça de Ferreira do Amaral.

Additional note

- This was a non-elimination leg.

=== Leg 5 (Macau → Hong Kong → Yukon) ===
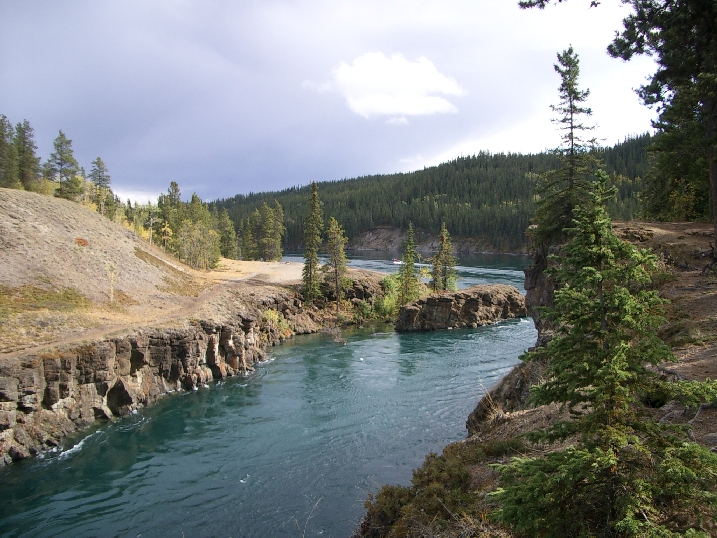
Miles Canyon served as the Pit Stop for this leg with teams arriving by canoeing the Yukon River.

- Episode 5: "Who Designs These Torture Tests?" (August 5, 2014)
- Prizes: Two round-trip tickets to any "sun destination" served by Air Canada Rouge and CA$3,000 (awarded to Alain & Audrey)
- Eliminated: Cormac & Nicole

Locations

- Macau (Kun Iam Statue)
- Macau → Hong Kong
- Hong Kong → Whitehorse, Yukon
- Whitehorse (Sky High Wilderness Ranch)
- Whitehorse (Sky High Ranch Office Building → Whitehorse Copper Trail)
- Whitehorse (Grey Mountain – Biathlon Yukon Course)
- Whitehorse (Chadburn Lake Road – Red Trail)
- Whitehorse (Miles Canyon)

Episode summary

- At the start of this leg, teams were instructed to fly to Whitehorse, Yukon. Once there, teams had to drive to Sky High Wilderness Ranch and spend the night. Teams then got their breakfast and their next clue at the ranch kitchen in the morning.
- This leg's Detour was a choice between Make Your Bed or Ride a Sled. In Make Your Bed, teams had to carry two heavy backpacks to a campsite, which had a locked chest and a key inside a block of ice in a cooler. They then had to empty their backpacks, build a tent, and start a campfire so as to melt the block the ice and retrieve the key. Once a wilderness expert was satisfied with their setup, teams could receive their next clue. In Ride A Sled, teams first had to select a tag with the names of three dogs from a board at the ranch and then run 1.5 kilometres (0.93 mi) on a trail to Fish Lake. There, they had to search through a number of dog harnesses for the ones that matched the three dogs they had selected. Once they found the harnesses, teams had to correctly put them on the dogs and attach the dogs to the sled. Each team member then had to complete three laps around the frozen lake in order to receive their next clue.
- For their Speed Bump, Sukhi & Jinder had to hook a 20-foot (6.1 m) trailer to their truck and drive 12.5 kilometres (7.8 mi) to a marked parking spot, where they had to back their trailer into the spot without hitting any of the cones before they could continue racing.
- After the Detour, teams had to drive to Grey Mountain and find their next clue.
- In this leg's Roadblock, one team member had to ride a snow bike along a one-kilometre (0.62 mi) course in the woods before heading to the shooting range, where they had to successfully shoot all five targets without missing in order to receive their next clue. If they missed any of the targets, they had to start over by running the course again before shooting the remaining targets.
- After the Roadblock, teams had to drive to the Red Trail, portage a canoe from the woods, and then paddle down the Yukon River 1.5 kilometres (0.93 mi) to the Pit Stop: Miles Canyon.

=== Leg 6 (Yukon → Manitoba) ===
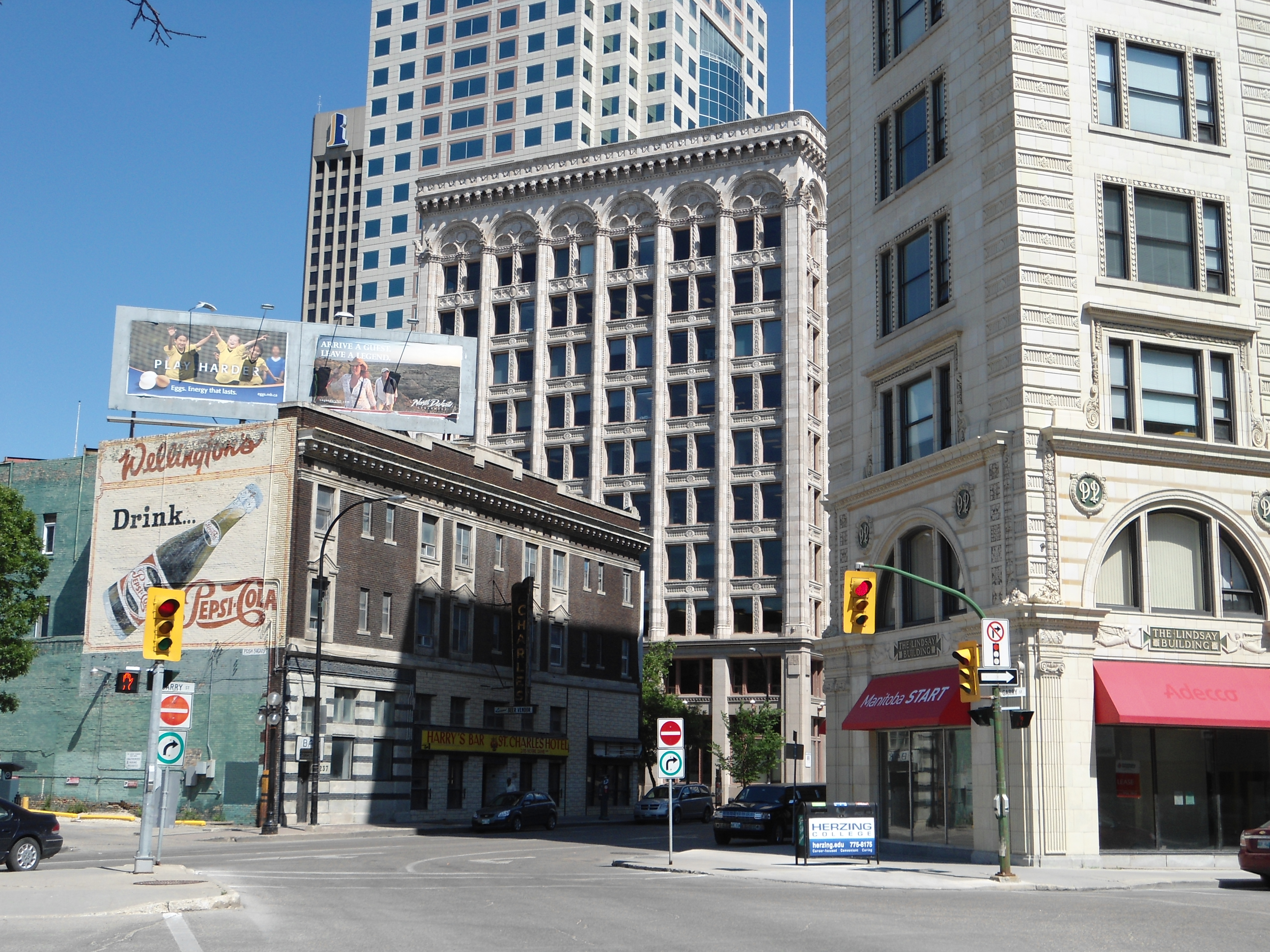
For this leg's Fast Forward in Winnipeg's Exchange District, teams had to search for its historic ghost signs, such as the one on the building on the left.

- Episode 6: "She's the Pierogi Poobah" (August 12, 2014)
- Prizes: All-inclusive vacation to Los Cabos, Mexico and CA$3,000 (awarded to Pierre & Michel)
- Eliminated: Rex & Bob

Locations

- Whitehorse → Winnipeg, Manitoba
- Winnipeg (Manitoba Legislative Building)
- Winnipeg (Royal Canadian Mint)
- Winnipeg (Portage and Main)
- Winnipeg (Exchange District – The Cube)
- Winnipeg (Downtown Winnipeg – MTS Centre or North End – St. Ivan Suchavsky Ukrainian Orthodox Cathedral)
- Winnipeg (Exchange District – Whiskey Dix)
- Winnipeg (Canadian Museum for Human Rights)

Episode summary

- The first clue of this leg told teams to find the Golden Boy, which is the statue atop the Manitoba Legislative Building in Winnipeg. Teams then went to the Royal Canadian Mint and received coins from ten different countries. They had to run along the mint's driveway, where there were a series of flagpoles representing all of the countries for whom this mint produced coinage, and had to match each coin to its nation's flag in order to receive their next clue directing them to Portage and Main.
- This season's first Fast Forward had teams go to the Exchange District's iconic building "The Cube" and receive a list of partial phrases from a police officer. They then had to search around the district for seven historic ghost sign advertisements on the outside walls of buildings, which contained the full versions of their partial phrases. The first team to return to The Cube with all seven phrases completed received the Fast Forward award. Alain & Audrey won the Fast Forward.
- This leg's Detour was a choice between Puck It or Pinch It. In Puck It, teams had to travel to the MTS Centre and dress in hockey gear. Racers then had to alternate guiding a puck down a slalom of cones and shooting it through five holes in a wooden goalie before receiving their next clue. In Pinch It, teams travelled to the St. Ivan Suchavsky Cathedral and had to properly make 74 traditional Ukrainian perogies in the basement hall in order to receive their next clue.
- After the Detour, teams had to travel to Whiskey Dix and find their next clue.
- In this leg's Roadblock, one team member had to dress as a glam rock star and memorize a rock and roll song. They then had to perform it with a band in front of an audience and could receive their next clue if they sang all of the lyrics correctly. Pierre & Michel used their Express Pass to bypass this Roadblock.
- After the Roadblock, teams had to check in at the Pit Stop: the Canadian Museum for Human Rights.

=== Leg 7 (Manitoba → France) ===
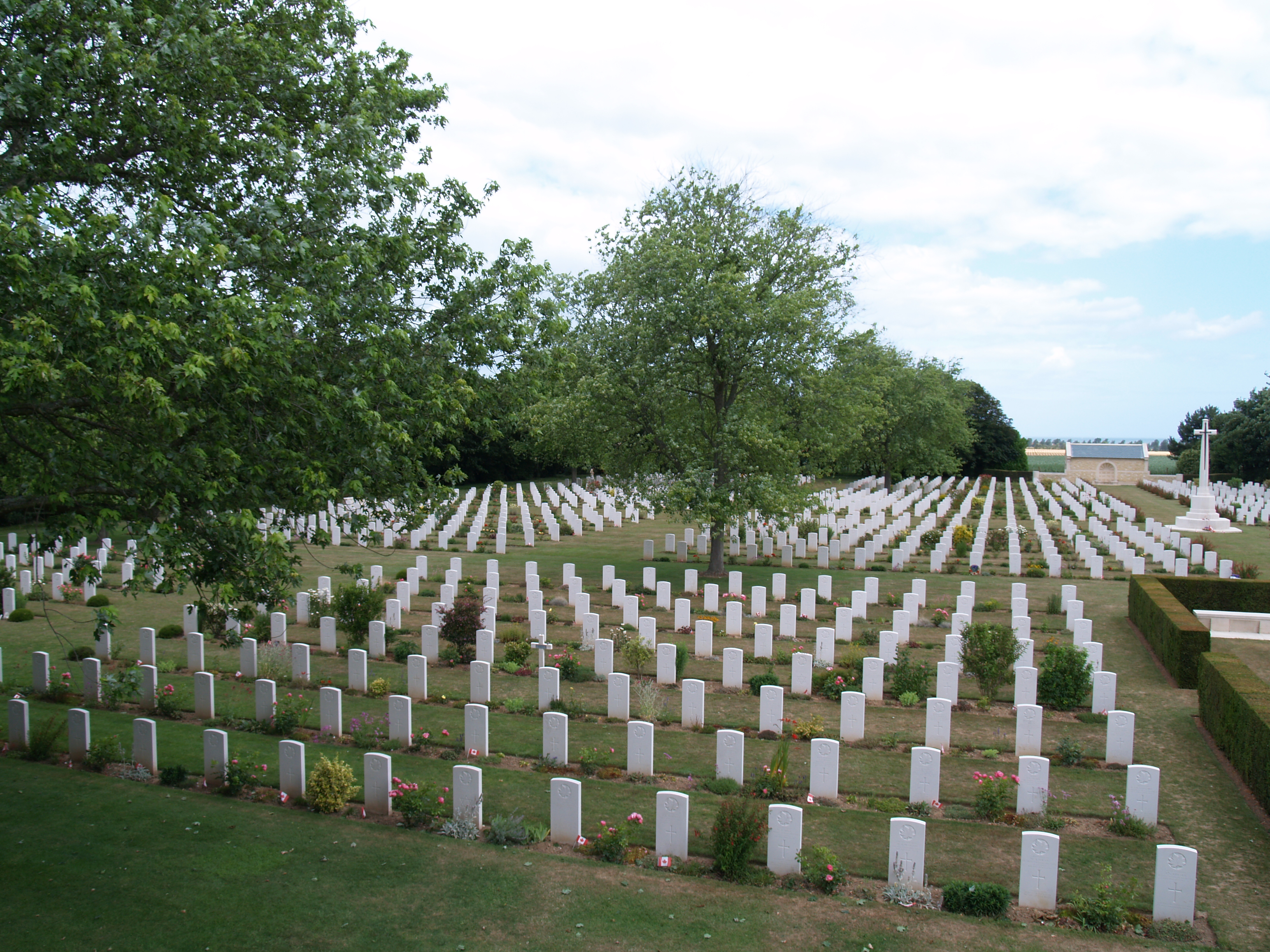
Teams visited the Bény-sur-Mer Canadian War Cemetery in Lower Normandy to honour the Canadian soldiers who died in World War II.

- Episode 7: "Lest We Forget" (August 19, 2014)
- Prizes: Two round-trip tickets to any European destination served by Air Canada and CA$3,000 (awarded to Natalie & Meaghan)

Locations

- Winnipeg (Portage & Main)
- Winnipeg → Paris, France
- Coquainvilliers (Calvados Boulard)
- Le Molay-Littry (Hôtel de Ville)
- Saon (Ferme Élevage de Nesque) or Bayeux (Musée de la Tapisserie de Bayeux)
- Asnelles (Beach)
- Bény-sur-Mer (Bény-sur-Mer Canadian War Cemetery)
- Courseulles-sur-Mer (Juno Beach Centre – Remembrance and Renewal Statue)
- Courseulles-sur-Mer (Juno Beach)

Episode summary

- At the start of this leg, teams were instructed to fly to Paris, France. Once there, teams had to drive to Calvados Boulard, which had their next clue.
- In this leg's Roadblock, one team member had to take a sample of Calvados from a barrel and use a mathematical formula and the provided tools to distill the calvados to 40% ABV in order to receive their next clue.
- After the Roadblock, teams had to drive to the Hôtel de Ville in Le Molay-Littry and find their next clue.
- This leg's Detour was a choice between Show It or Tell It. In Show It, teams had to drive to the Élevage de Nesque farm, where they had to correctly groom a Percheron horse and braid the horse's mane in order to receive their next clue. In Tell It, teams had to drive to the courtyard of the Bayeux Tapestry Museum, where they were given twelve images of the Norman invasion of England. Using nine descriptions on boards around the courtyard, teams had to identify the images that matched up to the descriptions and place them on a board in the correct order in order to receive their next clue.
- After the Detour, teams had to drive to Asnelles, where both team members had to participate in land sailing and complete a circuit ten times in order to receive their next clue. Teams then drove to the Bény-sur-Mer Canadian War Cemetery and took a moment of reflection for the 2,049 Canadian soldiers buried in the cemetery before receiving their next clue and a Lest We Forget card, which they had to deliver to the Canadian Army D-Day re-enactor stationed at the Remembrance and Renewal statue at the Juno Beach Centre. Once done, he direct teams to the Pit Stop on Juno Beach.

Additional notes

- Royal Winnipeg Rifles veteran Jim Parks appeared as the Pit Stop greeter for this leg, not far from where he fought ashore, alongside other men from the 7th Brigade, 3rd Canadian Infantry Division, during D-Day.
- This was a non-elimination leg.

=== Leg 8 (France) ===
After arriving in Paris, teams visited the Arc de Triomphe to search for their clue.

- Episode 8: "I Said Yes!" (August 26, 2014)
- Prizes: Two-round-trip tickets to any European destination served by Air Canada Rouge and CA$3,000 (awarded to Natalie & Meaghan)
- Eliminated: Pierre & Michel

Locations

- Bayeux (Streets of Bayeux)
- Bayeux (Gare de Bayeux) → Paris
- Paris (Arc de Triomphe)
- Paris (Place du Canada (in French) – Garden of New France)
- Paris (École de la Chambre Syndicale de la Couture Parisienne or Marais District)
- Paris (Centre Pompidou)
- Paris (Pont de Grenelle – Île aux Cygnes)
- Paris (Pont de l'Archevêché)
- Paris (Port de la Tournelle)

Episode summary

- At the start of this leg, teams were instructed to travel to the Gare de Bayeux and sign up for one of two trains to Paris. Once there, teams found their next clue at the Arc de Triomphe. Teams then had to search the Garden of New France at Place du Canada for their next clue.
- This leg's Detour was a choice between Haute Couture or Plat du Jour. In Haute Couture, teams travelled to the École de la Chambre Syndicale de la Couture Parisienne, where they had to use the provided tools and materials to cut and sew the fabric for a dress onto a dress form to the satisfaction of the maîtresse in order to receive their next clue. In Plat du Jour, teams travelled to the Marais District and had to search the chalkboards placed outside the cafés for three marked with Amazing Race flags. Teams had to purchase the marked items from these boards and memorize how to pronounce them in French. They then had to deliver the food to a waiting couple and say the names correctly in order to receive their next clue.
- After the Detour, teams had to travel to Centre Pompidou and find their next clue, which directed them to Île aux Cygnes.
- For their Speed Bump, Ryan & Rob had to perform the French folk song "Au clair de la lune" on a pair of accordions and play the song in unison for an audience before they could continue racing.
- In this leg's Roadblock, one team member had to recreate a local modern art painting using candies by placing the candies onto a board such that the image matched the painting in order to receive their next clue.
- After the Roadblock, teams had to travel to the Pont de l'Archevêché and search for the Pit Stop: the Port de la Tournelle on the banks of the Seine.

Additional note

- This leg featured a Double U-Turn. Pierre & Michel chose to use the U-Turn on Alain & Audrey, while Sukhi & Jinder chose to use the U-Turn on Ryan & Rob.

=== Leg 9 (France → Quebec) ===
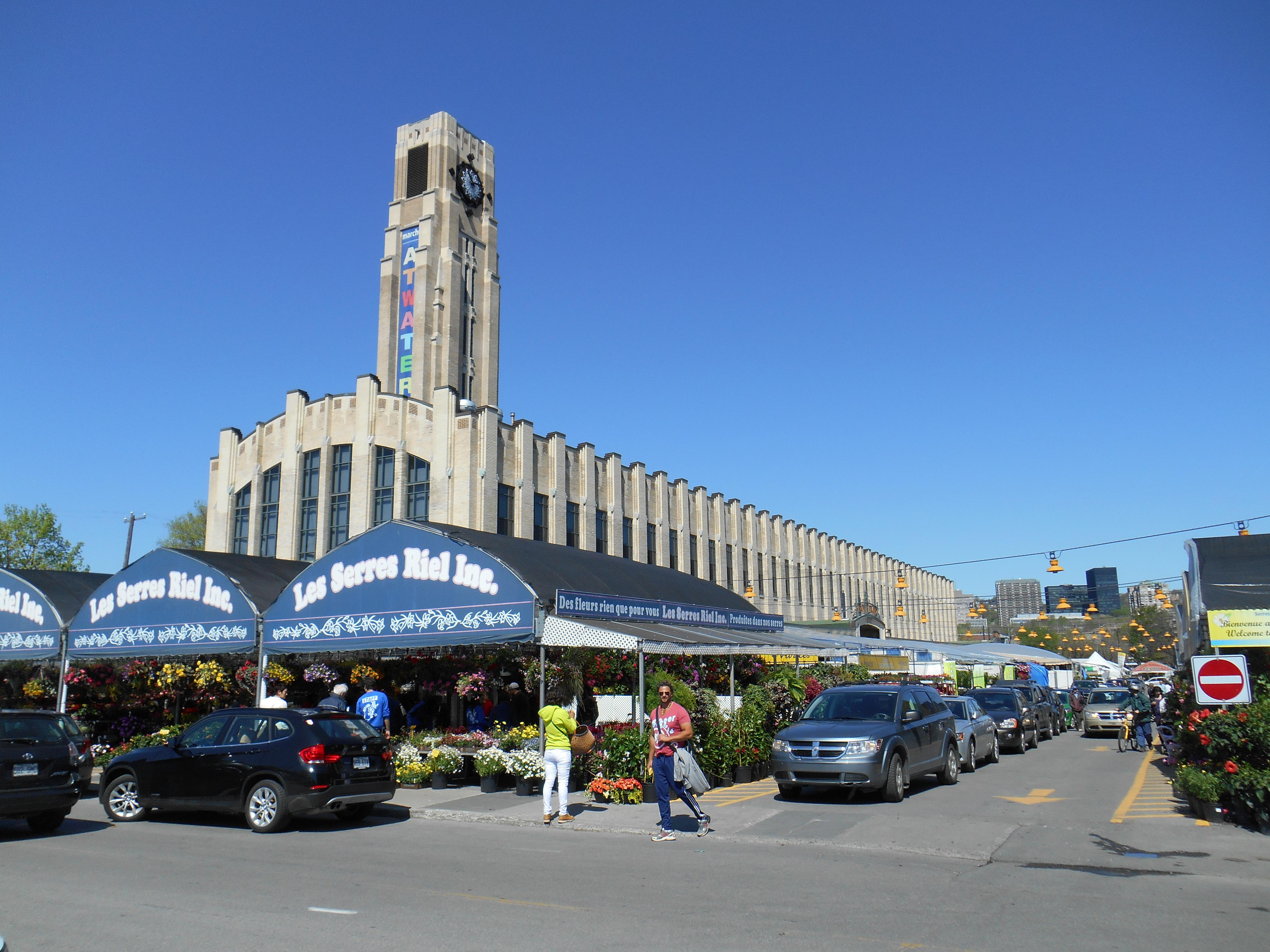
Teams visited the Atwater Market in Montreal and had to search the intersection of Avenue Atwater and Rue Saint-Ambroise for their next clue.

- Episode 9: "How Are We Going to Explain This to Mom and Dad?" (September 2, 2014)
- Prizes: Two-round-trip tickets to Milan, Italy, and CA$3,000 (awarded to Sukhi & Jinder)

Locations

- Paris (Trocadéro)
- Paris → Montreal, Quebec
- Montreal (Montréal–Trudeau International Airport – Air Canada Counter)
- Mirabel (Montréal–Mirabel International Airport – Circuit ICAR)
- Montreal (Atwater Market – Intersection of Avenue Atwater & Rue Saint-Ambroise)
- Montreal (Parisian Laundry)
- Montreal (Espace VERRE or Lachine Canal)
- Montreal (Victoria Square – Square-Victoria Metro Station)
- Montreal (Montreal Science Centre – Le Belvédère)

Episode summary

- At the start of this leg, teams were instructed to fly to Montreal, Quebec. Once there, teams had to search for the Air Canada Priority Check-in Counter, where they received their next clue. Teams then had to travel to Circuit ICAR in order to find their next clue.
- In this leg's Roadblock, one team member had to drive a Chevrolet Camaro SS and complete a two-stage precision driving course. First, they had to perform a quarter drift without spinning out. Then, they had to perform a 180° reverse turn in order to receive their next clue.
- After the Roadblock, teams had to find their next clue at the intersection of Avenue Atwater and Rue Saint-Ambroise within Atwater Market.
- This season's second Fast Forward required teams to travel to Parisian Laundry, where they had to select a pose, head into a curtained room, and then strike the pose so that artists could sketch the team. During the session, teams were asked to pose in their underwear and then eventually naked. If teams were uncomfortable, they could choose to go back to the Detour. The first team to finish their sketching session won the Fast Forward award. Sukhi & Jinder won the Fast Forward.
- This leg's Detour was a choice between Flamed or Grilled. In Flamed, teams had to travel to Espace VERRE and watch a demonstration by a local artist on how to melt glass rods to create beads. They then had to make five different beads that matched those on a sample necklace in order to receive their next clue. In Grilled, teams had to search the Lachine Canal for a food stand called Le Cheese, where they had to study and sample ten different grilled cheese sandwiches. Teams then had to run 50 metres (160 ft) to the Le Cheese food truck and correctly identify all grill cheese sandwich flavors from memory in order to receive their next clue.
- After the Detour, teams had to travel to Square-Victoria Metro Station and search the grounds outside the station's entrance for their next clue, which directed them to the Pit Stop: Le Belvédère at the Montreal Science Centre.

Additional note

- This was a non-elimination leg.

=== Leg 10 (Quebec → Prince Edward Island) ===
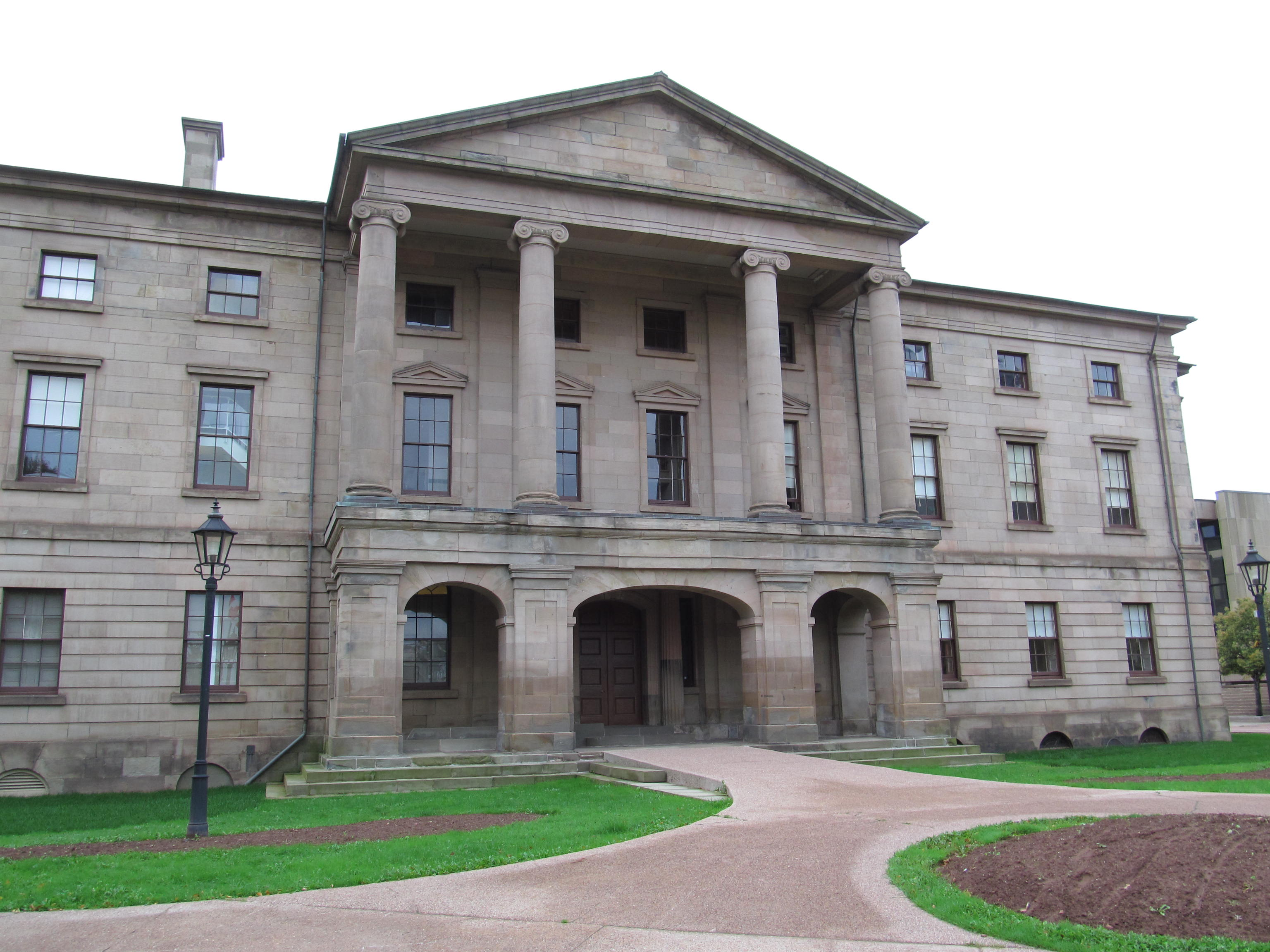
The Roadblock in Charlottetown required racers to identify the Fathers of Confederation impersonators inside their meeting in Prince Edward Island's Province House.

- Episode 10: "Hot Poop" (September 9, 2014)
- Prizes: Two round-trip tickets to any Canadian destination served by Air Canada and CA$5,000 (awarded to Sukhi & Jinder)
- Eliminated: Alain & Audrey

Locations

- Montreal (Place d'Armes)
- Montreal → Charlottetown, Prince Edward Island (Charlottetown Airport)
- Charlottetown (Red Shores Racetrack)
- Charlottetown (Province House)
- Cornwall (Petro-Canada Gas Station)
- New London (Lucy Maud Montgomery Birthplace)
- New London (Farmland near New London Community Complex)
- Springbrook (Prince Edward Aqua Farms) or New London (Mull Na Beinne Potato Farm)
- North Rustico (Farmers' Bank of Rustico)

Episode summary

- At the start of this leg, teams were instructed to fly to Charlottetown, Prince Edward Island. Once there, they had to search for a marked vehicle in the airport parking lot, which contained their next clue. Teams then had to drive to Red Shores Racetrack and search the paddock for their next clue instructing one team member to carry their partner using a sulky around the racetrack for two laps while wearing blinders in order to receive their next clue, which directed teams to Province House.
- In this leg's Roadblock, one team member had to speak to impersonators of friends and family of selected Fathers of Confederation attendees of the 1864 Charlottetown Conference on the grounds of the Province House, who would give their delegate's name and a physical description of him. The team member then had to go inside and correctly identify from memory the 10 Fathers of Confederation impersonators in order to receive their next clue from an impersonator of the first Prime Minister of Canada, Sir John A. Macdonald.
- After the Roadblock, teams had to drive to the Petro-Canada gas station in Cornwall and fill the gas tanks of their cars in order to receive their next clue, which directed them to drive to the Lucy Maud Montgomery Birthplace.
- For their Speed Bump, Ryan & Rob had to dig for three bottles of "moonshine" inside a pile of horse manure before they could continue racing.
- This leg's Detour was a choice between Mussel or Mass. In Mussel, teams had to drive to Prince Edward Aqua Farms and process 1,800 pounds (820 kg) of mussels. They had to suit up, strip all of the mussels from their "socks", and place them into a new bin in order to receive their next clue. In Mass, teams had to drive to a potato farm and calculate the weight of over 10 million Russet potatoes using a tape measure and a calculator in order to receive their next clue.
- After the Detour, teams had to check in at the Pit Stop: the Farmers' Bank of Rustico in North Rustico.

Additional note

- The manure search task was later revisited in season 10 as a Switchback.

=== Leg 11 (Prince Edward Island → New Brunswick) ===
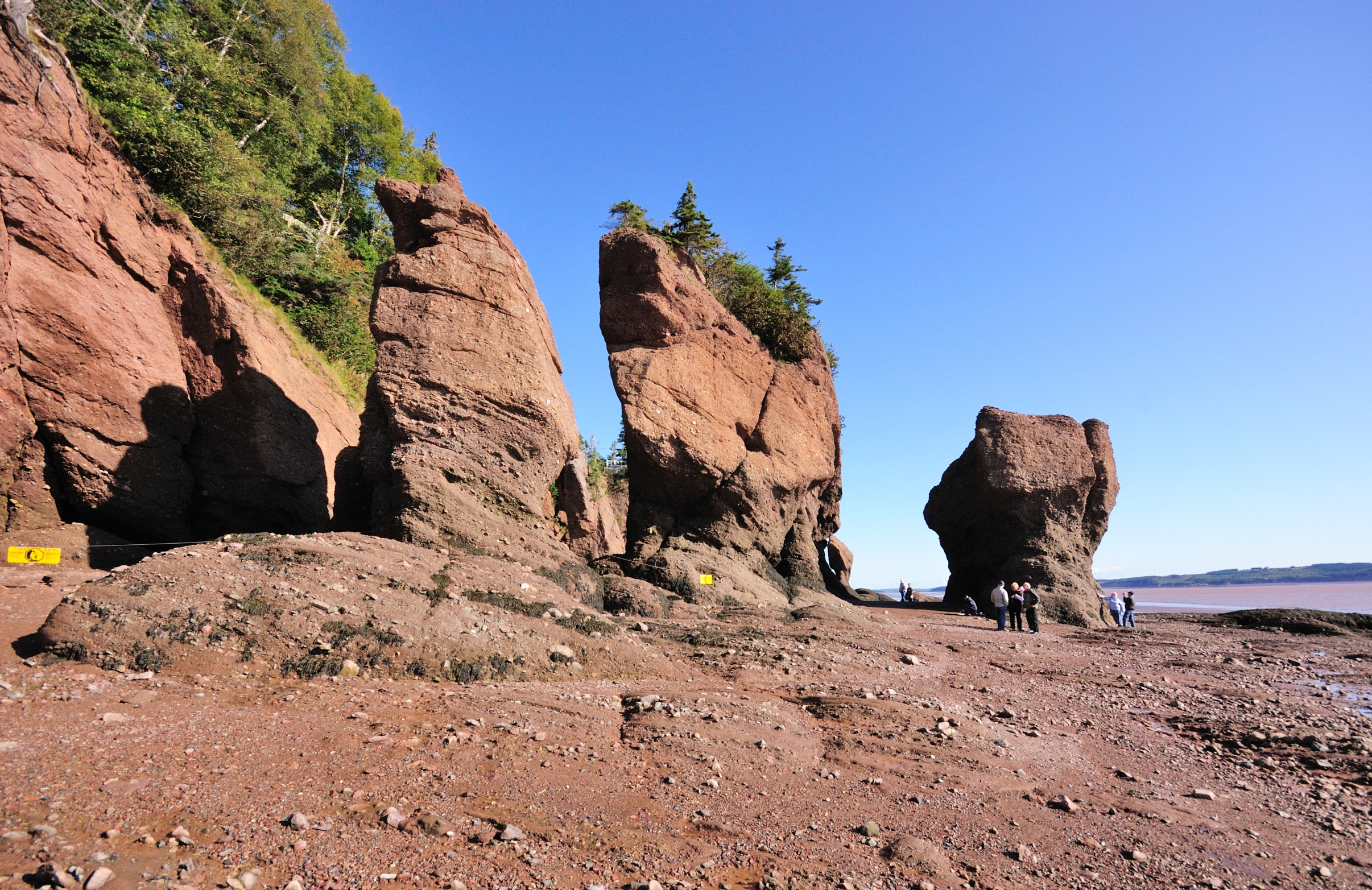
While in New Brunswick, teams visited the famous Hopewell Rocks.

- Episode 11: "Put the Fun Back in Fundy" (September 16, 2014)
- Prizes: Two round-trip tickets to any United States destination served by Air Canada and CA$5,000 (awarded to Natalie & Meaghan)
- Eliminated: Sukhi & Jinder

Locations

- Charlottetown (Peake's Wharf)
- Shediac, New Brunswick (The World's Largest Lobster) (Unaired)
- Shediac (Dairy Queen)
- Hopewell Cape (Albert County Museum)
- Hopewell Cape (Hopewell Rocks)
- Harvey (Cape Enrage)
- Harvey (Cape Enrage Lighthouse)

Episode summary

- At the start of this leg, teams had to drive across the Confederation Bridge to Shediac, New Brunswick. There, teams had to find The World's Largest Lobster and search for a lobster fisherman with their next clue. This segment was unaired.
- At the Dairy Queen in Shediac, teams had to serve Blizzards and custom ice cream cakes for an Acadian birthday party in order to receive their next clue, which directed teams to the Albert County Museum.
- This season's final Detour was a choice between By Land or By Sea. In By Land, teams first had to get a GPS and then find ten hidden items (geocaches) using their GPS in order to receive their next clue. In By Sea, teams first had to locate the Hopewell Rocks and had to learn the maritime tradition of international signal flags. There, they found a box of 100 different flags and seven nautical messages. They then had to run along the beach until they found a code book, where they could memorize the flag codes. Teams then had to go back to the area where they found their box, find the matching flags, then place them up on a pole in the correct order in order to receive their next clue.
- After the Detour, teams had to drive to Cape Enrage, which had their next clue.
- In this leg's Roadblock, one team member had to rappel down the rock face of Cape Enrage, where they found the first half of their next clue. They then had to run along the rocky shore and climb up the rock face in order to retrieve the second half of their clue.
- After the Roadblock, one team member had to correctly secure a safety harness to their partner and then zipline with them down to the Pit Stop at the Cape Enrage Lighthouse.

=== Leg 12 (New Brunswick → Ontario) ===
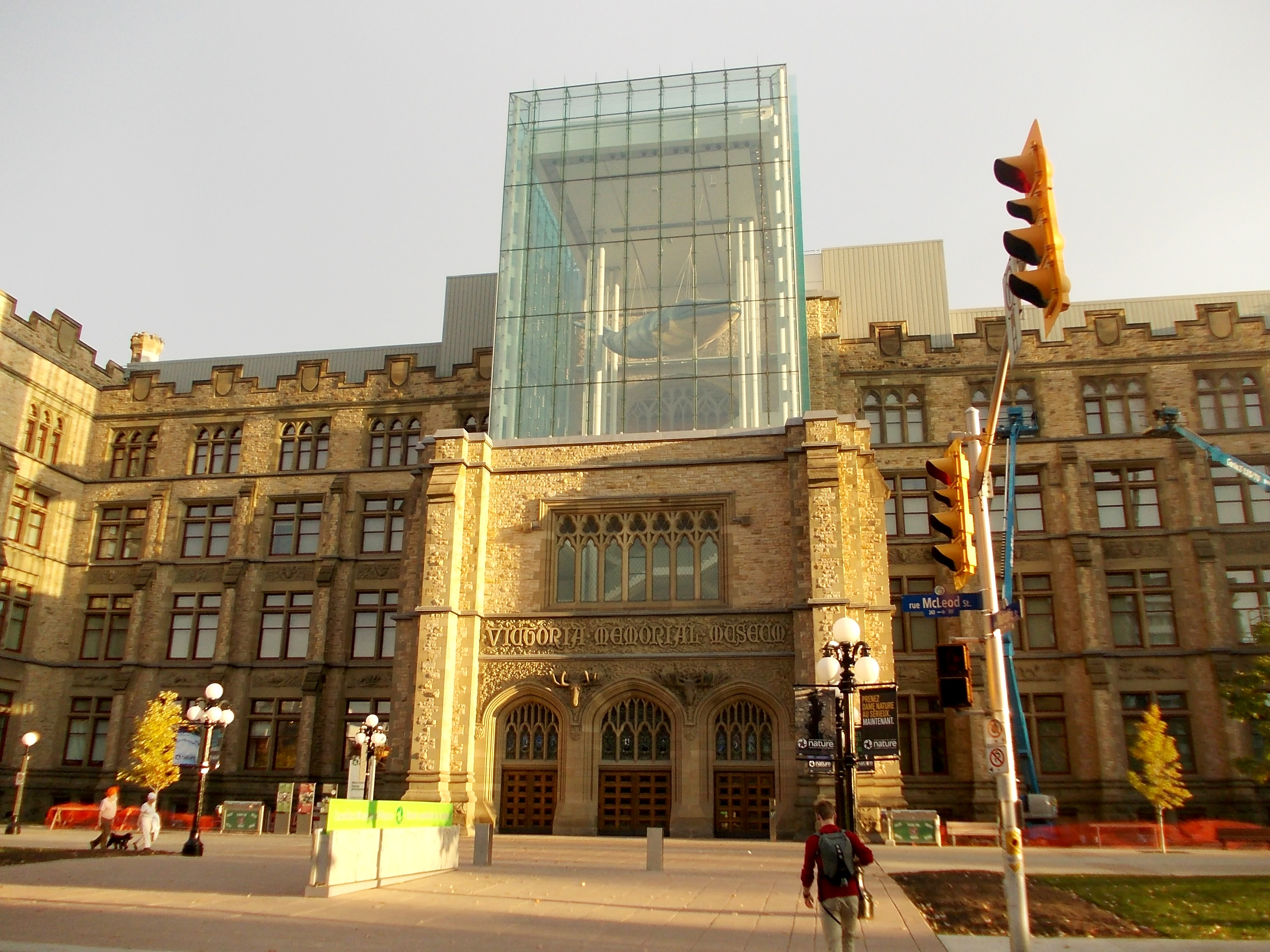
The final Roadblock in Ottawa required one team member to ascend the new glass atrium of the Canadian Museum of Nature.

- Episode 12: "Who's Da Bomb?" (September 21, 2014)
- Prizes: A CA$250,000 cash payout, "gas for life", the opportunity to fly for a year anywhere Air Canada flies worldwide, and two Chevrolet Silverado trucks (awarded to Mickey & Pete)
- Winners: Mickey & Pete
- Runners-up: Natalie & Meaghan
- Third place: Ryan & Rob

Locations

- Moncton (Moncton 100 Monument)
- Moncton → Ottawa, Ontario
- Ottawa (Ottawa Macdonald–Cartier International Airport – Air Canada Maple Leaf Lounge)
- Ottawa (Fleet Street Pumping Station → Rideau Canal)
- Ottawa (Parliament Hill – Centennial Flame)
- Ottawa (Parliament Hill – Centre Block)
- Carp (Diefenbunker)
- Ottawa (Canadian Museum of Nature)
- Ottawa (National Gallery of Canada – Baroque Room)
- Ottawa (Rideau Hall)

Episode summary

- At the start of this leg, teams were instructed to fly to Ottawa, Ontario. Once there, teams had to search for a clue box inside Air Canada Maple Leaf Lounge with their next clue. Teams then had to travel to Fleet Street Pumping Station and ride inflatable kayaks down the Ottawa River through an Olympic kayaking training course until they reached the Rideau Canal. Teams then had to find their next clue at the Centennial Flame on Parliament Hill.
- At Parliament Hill, teams had to find the office of the Speaker of the House and choose one of three envelopes with a date written on it. They then had to search among the thousands of books stored in the office containing the transcripts of the House of Commons' debates, known as Hansard, for their specified date, figure out which historic Canadian event took place on that date, and bring their answer to the librarian at the Library of Parliament to receive their next clue, which directed teams to the Diefenbunker in order to find their next clue. The dates chosen were: Mickey & Pete: March 25, 1986 – Introduction of the loonie coin; Natalie & Meaghan: March 30, 1949 – Adoption of "O Canada" in English and French; Ryan & Rob: December 15, 1964 – Introduction of the new Canadian flag.
- In this leg's first Roadblock, one team member had to enter the Diefenbunker and search among the bunker's vast array of rooms for three of five hidden toys: a helicopter, tank, jeep, plane, and compass. Once they found three and returned them to the front desk, they could receive their next clue.
- In this season's final Roadblock, the team member who did not perform the previous Roadblock had to use a mechanical ascender to climb to the top of the glass atrium of the Canadian Museum of Nature, grabbing their next clue along the way. Once at the top, they had to pull themselves along the roof before they could return to their partner.
- At the National Gallery of Canada, teams had to put together an art installation known as Paintings from the Race. They had to choose from a large selection of paintings, 36 of which depicted places seen on the season. They had to arrange these paintings in the correct order. Once all of the paintings were correct, teams received their final clue directing them to the finish line at Rideau Hall.

Leg	Location	Paintings		
1	Jasper National Park & Victoria	Athabasca Glacier	The Empress	Fisgard Lighthouse
2	Tofino	Ucluelet Harbour Seafoods	Surfer	Driftwood Chair
3	Hong Kong	Tian Tan Buddha	She Wong Lam Snake Restaurant	Bruce Lee Statue
4	Macau	Macau Tower	Fan-Tan	Grand Lapa Hotel
5	Whitehorse	Sky High Wilderness Ranch	Biathlon Gun	Miles Canyon
6	Winnipeg	Manitoba Legislative Building	Whiskey Dix	Pit Stop Greeter
7	Normandy	Calvados Boulard	Bény-sur-Mer Canadian War Cemetery	Juno Beach Centre
8	Paris	Centre Georges-Pompidou	Mentos	Pont de l'Archevêché
9	Montreal	Chevrolet Camaro SS	Square-Victoria Metro Station	Pit Stop Greeter
10	Prince Edward Island	Red Shores Racetrack	Province House	Lucy Maud Montgomery's House
11	New Brunswick	The World's Largest Lobster	Cape Enrage	Cape Enrage Lighthouse
12	Ottawa	Parliament Hill	Diefenbunker	Baroque Room

Additional note

- A year's supply of gas was awarded to the "fan favourite" team based on an online vote. Natalie & Meaghan received this prize.

== Ratings ==
DVR ratings are included in Numeris's count.

No.	Airdate	Episode	Viewers (millions)	Rank (Night)	Rank (Week)	Ref
1	July 8, 2014	"What's It Take to Get a Cup of Tea?"	2.76	1	2	
2	July 15, 2014	"There's a Fish in My Pants"	2.51	1	1	
3	July 22, 2014	"Snakes and Liars"	2.68	1	1	
4	July 29, 2014	"They're Harshing Our Mellow"	2.52	1	1	
5	August 5, 2014	"Who Designs These Torture Tests?"	2.66	1	1	
6	August 12, 2014	"She's the Pierogi Poobah"	2.97	1	1	
7	August 19, 2014	"Lest We Forget"	2.69	1	1	
8	August 26, 2014	"I Said Yes!"	2.69	1	1	
9	September 2, 2014	"How Are We Going to Explain This to Mom and Dad?"	2.87	1	1	
10	September 9, 2014	"Hot Poop"	2.90	1	1	
11	September 16, 2014	"Put the Fun Back in Fundy"	3.03	1	1	
12	September 21, 2014	"Who's Da Bomb?"	3.03	1	1	
