= White Horse Rapids =

Rapids in Yukon, Canada

The Whitehorse rapids were rapids on the Yukon River in Canada's Yukon Territory, named for their supposed resemblance to the mane of a charging white horse. The rapids formed where the Yukon River flows across and cuts down through lava flows of the Miles Canyon basalt. These rapids presented a major navigational obstacle on the Yukon River during the Klondike Gold Rush, and lent their name to the nearby city of Whitehorse.

The Whitehorse dam, constructed in 1957–1958, submerged the rapids beneath the newly created Schwatka Lake.

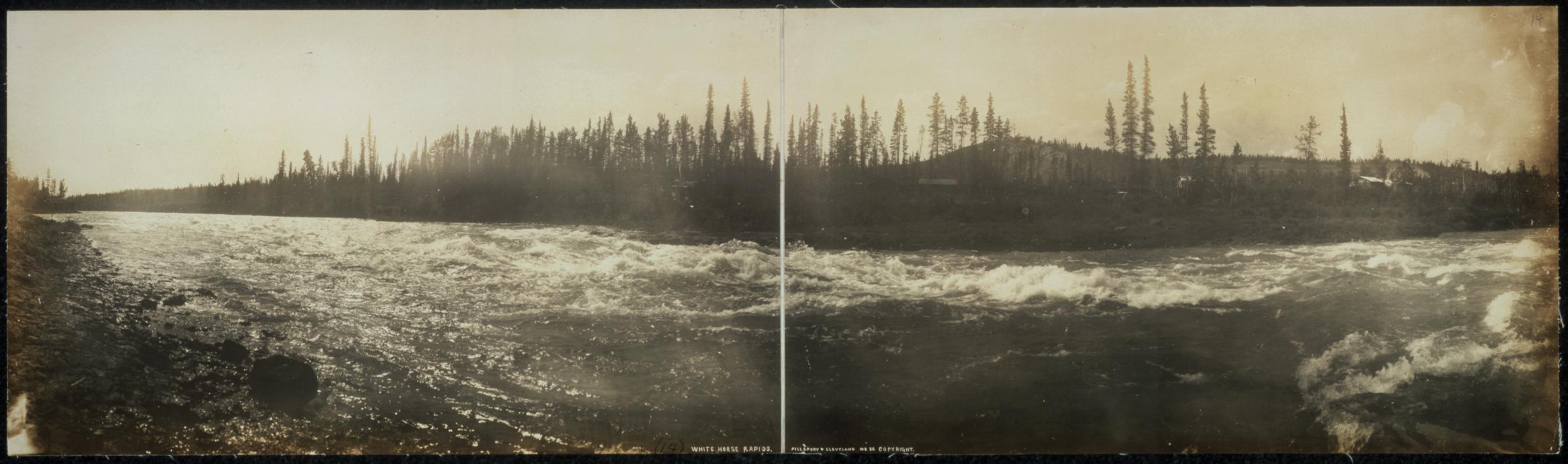
Panorama of the White Horse rapids, 1899
