= Tom Francis Collins =

English drifter and convicted murderer (1886–1907)

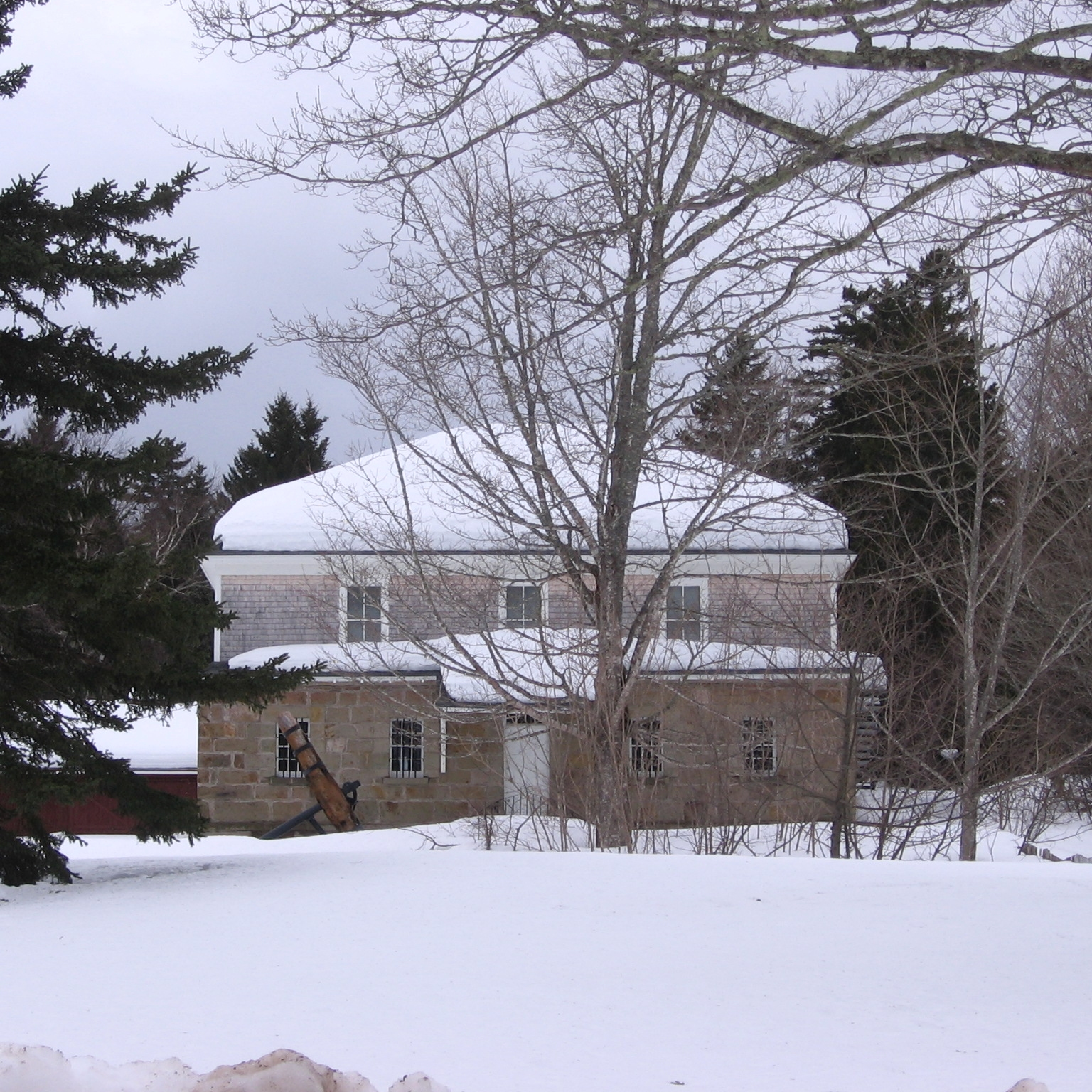
Albert County Gaol in Hopewell Cape, New Brunswick where Collins was hanged for murder in 1907.

Thomas Francis Collins (1886–15 November, 1907) was an English drifter who was convicted and hanged for murder in Albert County, New Brunswick in 1907. The events of the murder and trials resulted in several legal firsts in Canada.

== Background ==
Tom Collins arrived in Albert County in the fall of 1906. He found room and board with the parish priest of New Ireland, north of present day Fundy National Park. He was there about a week when the priest left on church business. When the priest returned he found the body of his housekeeper Mary Ann McAuley in the woodshed with an axe wound to the back of her head and her throat slit. Tom Collins could not be located in the area but was eventually found north of the community of St. George. He was found with a set of the priest's clothes and a pocket watch belonging to Mary Ann.

Tom Collins was taken into custody and questioned later that night. Collins gave his statement of what had happened that day, stating he had had an argument with Mary Ann but denying his guilt in the murder. This statement was not admitted at the first trial due to improper reading of Collins' rights.

== First trial ==
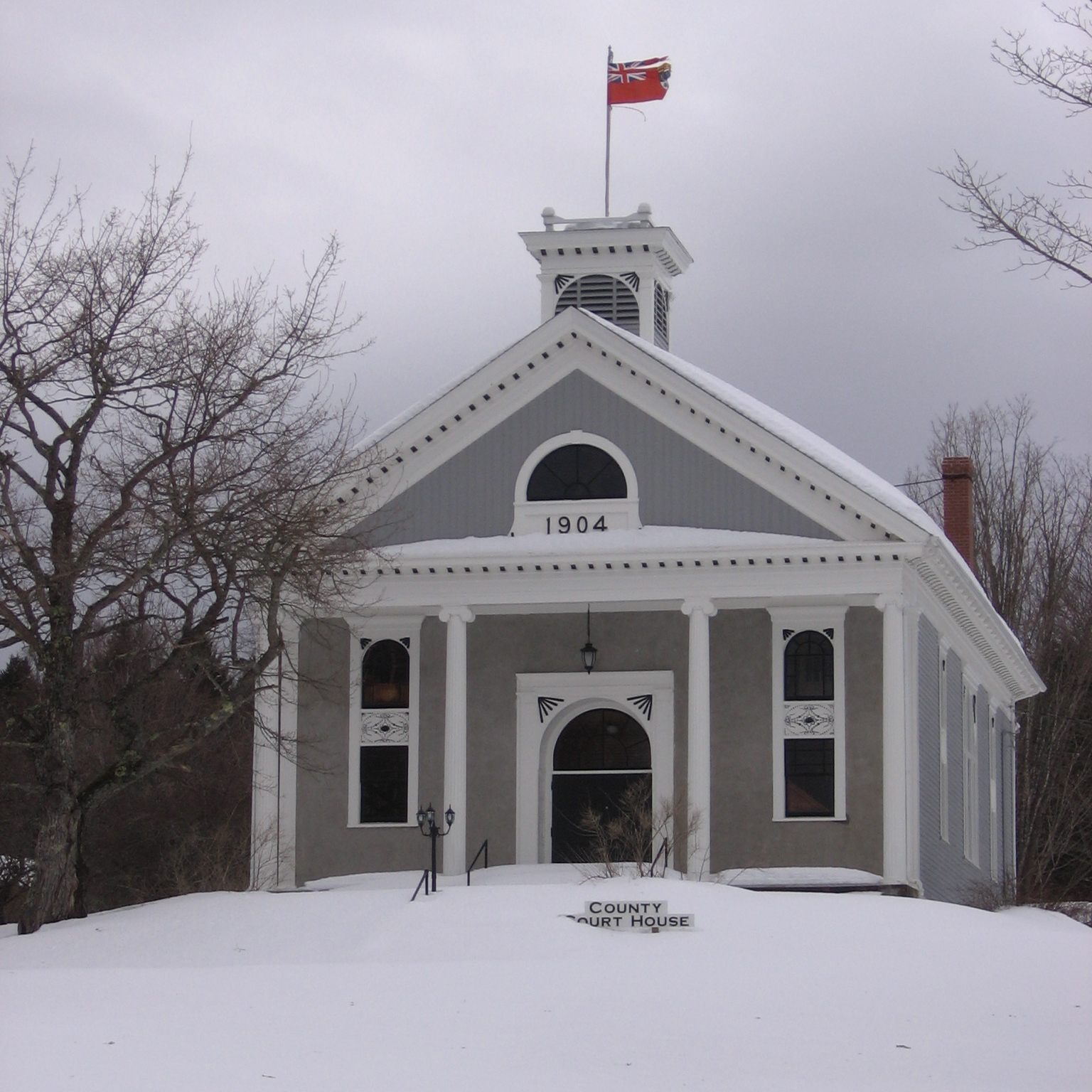
The Albert County Courthouse was almost new when Collins went on trial there in 1907.

The first trial began in January 1907. The prosecutor's case was circumstantial but it received assistance when the judge gave his final instructions to the jury stating in effect that the case was fully proven. The jury took two hours to come back with a verdict of guilty and the judge immediately ordered Collins hanged. The verdict was overturned on the basis of a judicial misdirection, a first in Canadian legal history.

== Second trial ==
The second trial began on June 25, 1907 with Collins himself taking the stand. The jury deliberated two days but were unable to come to a unanimous verdict, with seven in favour of innocence and five opposed. A hung jury was declared which precipitated a third trial.

== Third trial ==
The third trial began in the fall of 1907, presided over by the noted Daniel Lionel Hanington. The trial faced immediate trouble selecting the jury. Having had two previous trials and a media circus surrounding the case, it was difficult to find twelve impartial jurors. 120 people were examined, a record at the time, before a suitable jury was selected. Tom Collins was found guilty and sentenced to be hanged.

== Execution ==
There were several appeals to Ottawa and a last-minute plea to Governor General Earl Grey who, on the advice of the Privy Council, declined commutation. He was hanged by executioner John Radclive at the Albert County Jail on November 15, 1907.

== See also ==
- Albert County Museum
