= Miles Canyon Basalts =

Rocks in Yukon, Canada

Coordinates: 60°39′41.41″N 135°1′42.64″W

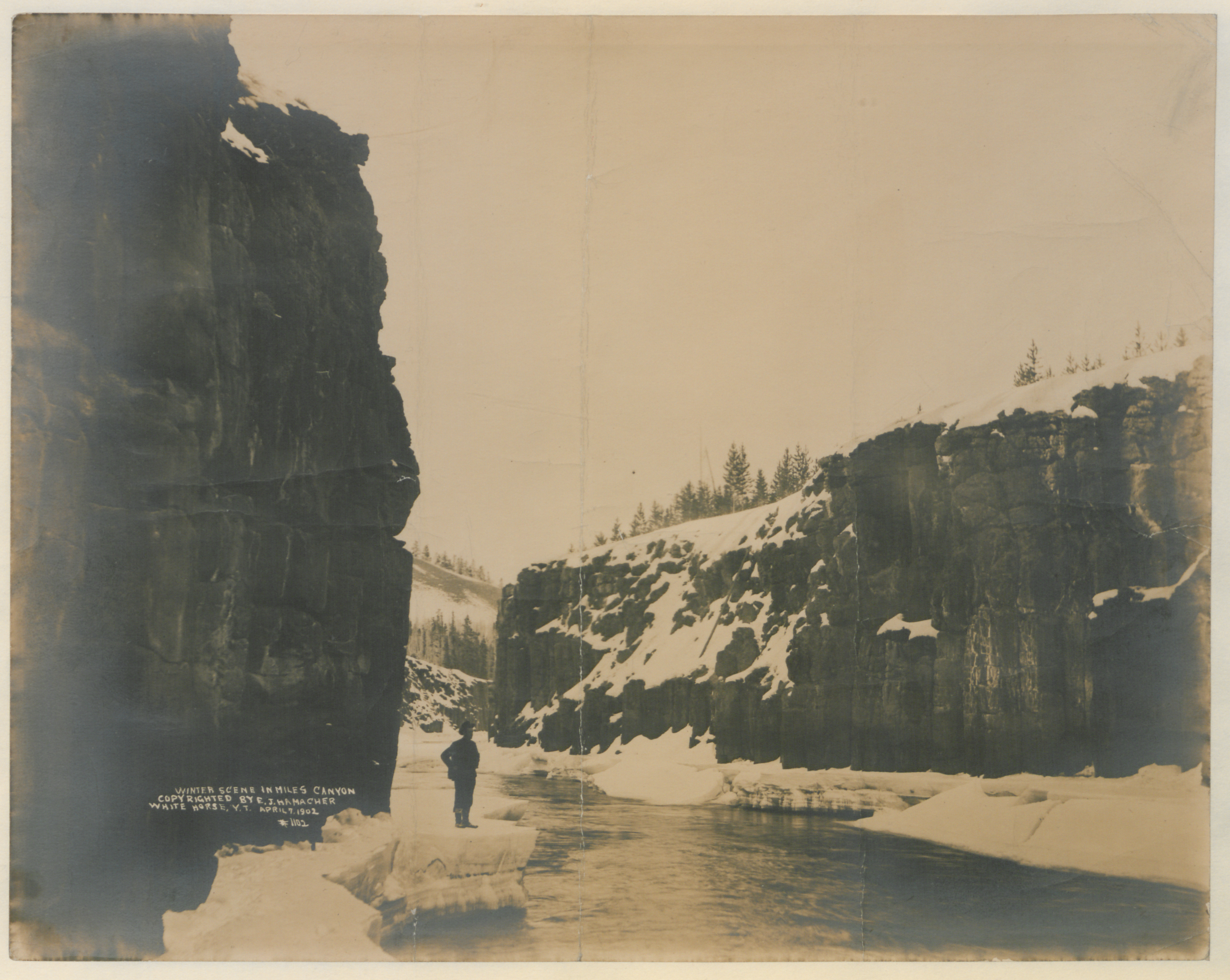
Winter scene in Miles Canyon, 1902.

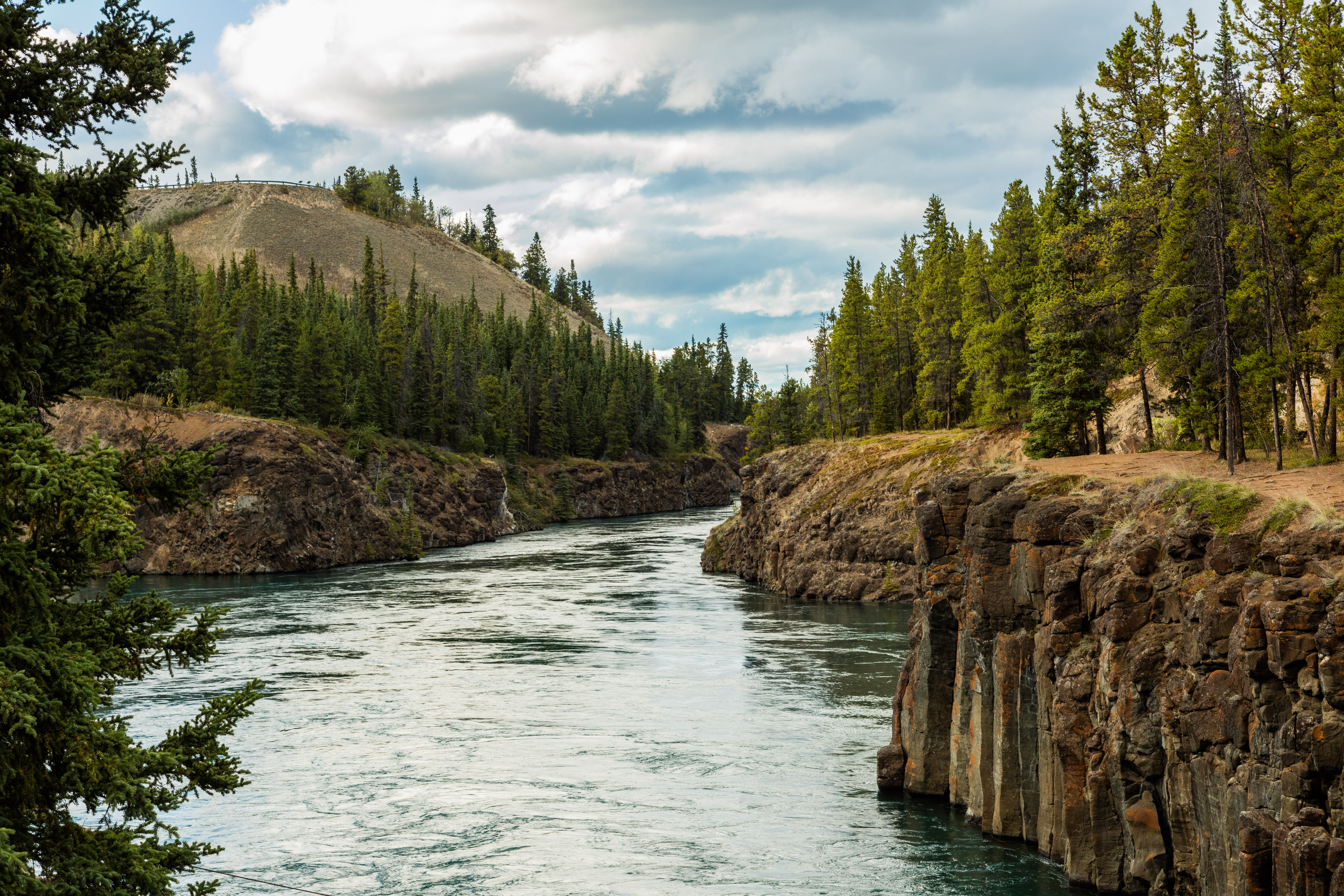
View of the basalts along the Yukon River (2017).

The Miles Canyon Basalts represent a package of rocks that include various exposures of basaltic lava flows and cones that erupted and flowed across an ancient pre-glacial landscape in south-central Yukon, Canada.

The volcanic rocks are best exposed and most easily accessible at the Miles Canyon location where the Yukon River cuts through a succession of flows south of Whitehorse. In the spring, good exposures can also be seen immediately downstream from the Yukon River hydro dam in Whitehorse which was built to extract energy from the cataracts that were the White Horse Rapids. These rapids and the Miles Canyon provided a significant challenge to gold-seekers heading to the Klondike Gold Rush, and also established the upstream terminus for paddle-wheel river boats. Thus, the Miles Canyon Basalts are the reason for the establishment of the townsite of Closeleigh, eventually the City of Whitehorse.

The Miles Canyon Basalts were thought to be of Pleistocene age. However, geological investigations supported by geochronological analyses indicate that these rocks are much older. The 'type' Miles Canyon flows along the Yukon River are ~8.4 million years old (Miocene) and the Alligator Lake flows are ~3.2 million years old (Pliocene). The Alligator Lake cones may be younger but have been affected by glaciation so are not entirely post-glacial in age.

== See also ==
- Volcanism in Canada
- List of volcanoes in Canada
