= Albert County Museum =

Museum in Hopewell Cape, New Brunswick

Coordinates: 45°50′56.8″N 64°34′37.1″W

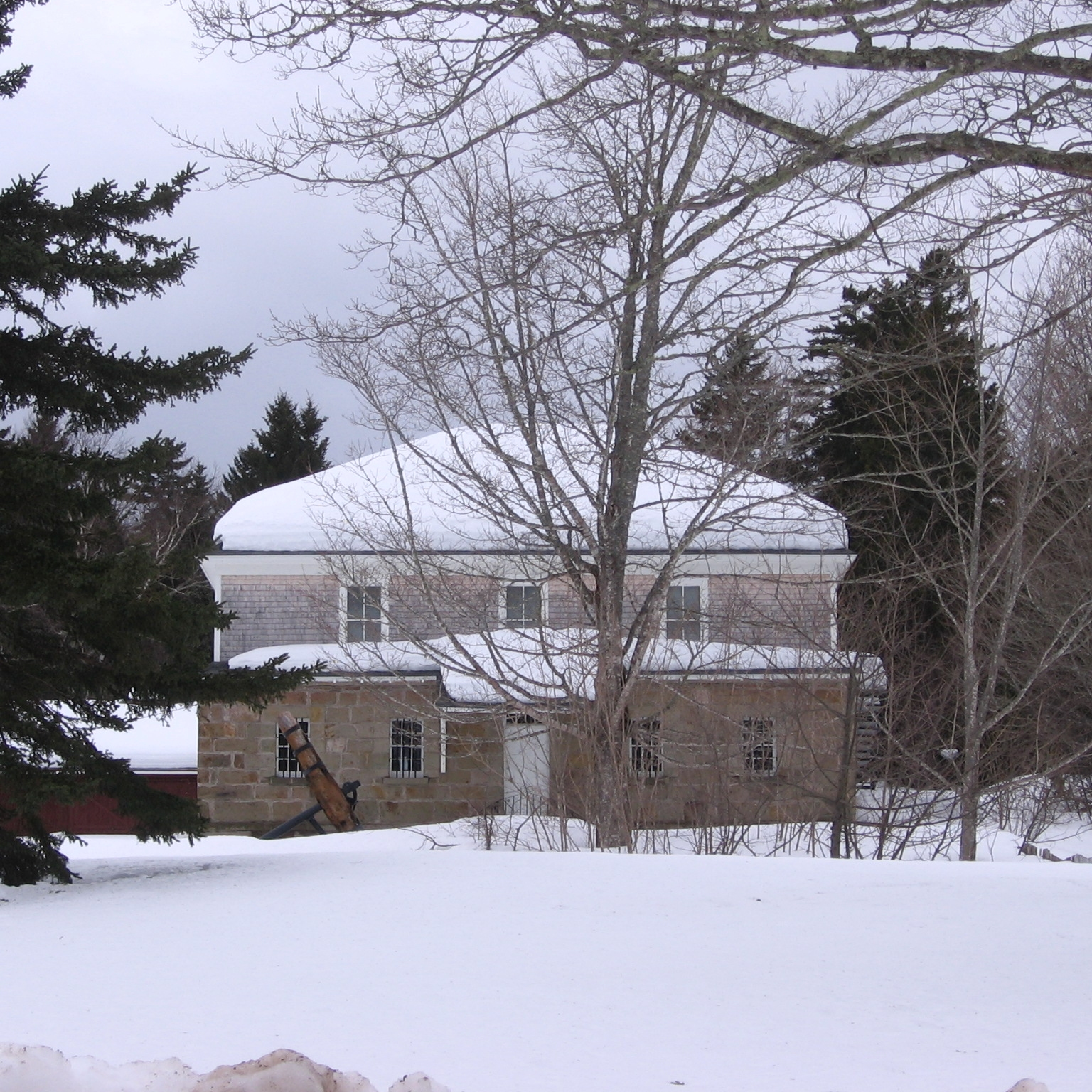
This old jail is part of the Albert County Museum Complex in Hopewell

The Albert County Museum is located in Hopewell Cape, New Brunswick. The Museum consists of eight buildings on a six-acre site and features twenty-two themed galleries. All of the buildings are original to the site and are part of the overall history presented. The County Tax Office, County Records Office and County Gaol are from the time of the creation of Albert County in 1845. The County Court House on the site was built in 1904 to replace the original that had been lost in a fire earlier. The complex encompasses what was known as the Shiretown (capital) of Albert County. The Albert County Museum is owned and operated by the Albert County Historical Society Incorporated, a Registered Canadian Charity.

The museum houses the Prime Minister R.B. Bennett Commemorative Centre which opened in 2010 to commemorate the life of the Canadian Prime Minister, R. B. Bennett, who grew up in the community. It also contains artifacts and displays related to the convicted murderer, Tom Collins.

The Albert County Historical Society has held an annual quilt show at the museum since 1975, making it the longest-running quilt show in New Brunswick.
