= Cape Enrage Lighthouse =

Lighthouse in New Brunswick, Canada

Cape Enrage Lighthouse Cape Enrage Lighthouse
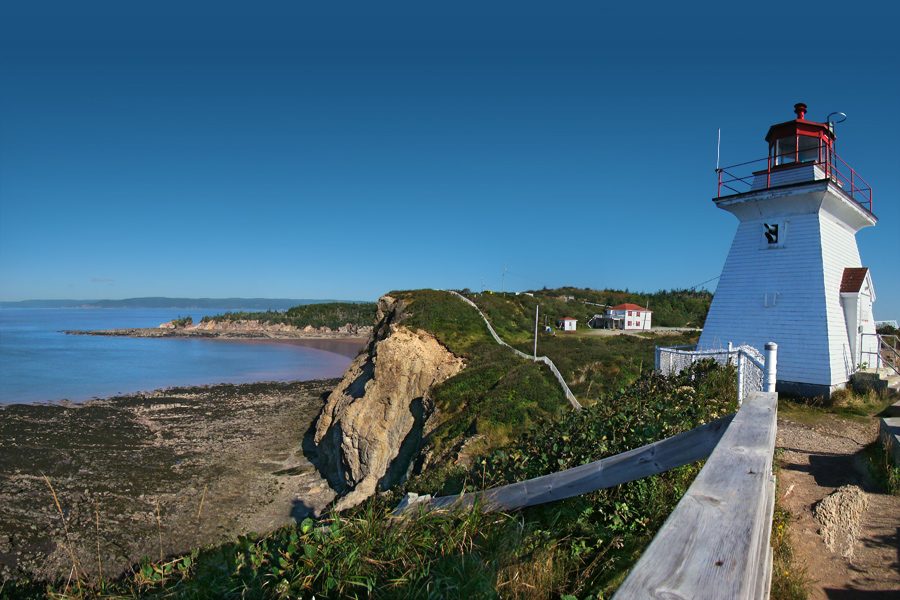
- Location: Cape Enrage, New Brunswick, Canada
- Coordinates: 45°35′36″N 64°46′49″W

Tower
- Constructed: 1868
- Construction: lumber (tower), concrete (foundation)
- Automated: 1980s
- Height: 9.2 m (30 ft)
- Shape: square
- Markings: white (tower), red (lantern), red (guard rail)
- Operator: Cape Enragé Adventure Centre
- Fog signal: 3 blasts every 60s.

Light
- First lit: 16 November 1870
- Focal height: 40.7 m (134 ft)
- Range: 10 nmi (19 km; 12 mi)
- Characteristic: Fl G 6s
- Original light
- Constructed: 1838
- Construction: lumber
- Shape: square
- First lit: 1840
- Deactivated: 1870
- Focal height: 161 ft (49 m)
- Characteristic: F W

The first lighthouse in the Upper Bay of Fundy, started in 1838 and completed in 1840, is located at Cape Enrage. It has been automated and unmanned since the 1980s, but it has recently become a popular tourist destination, as a result of a concentrated effort by local students to renovate the property and run it as a summer project. Frommer's travel guide lists it as one of the 'Best Views in Canada.'

== History ==
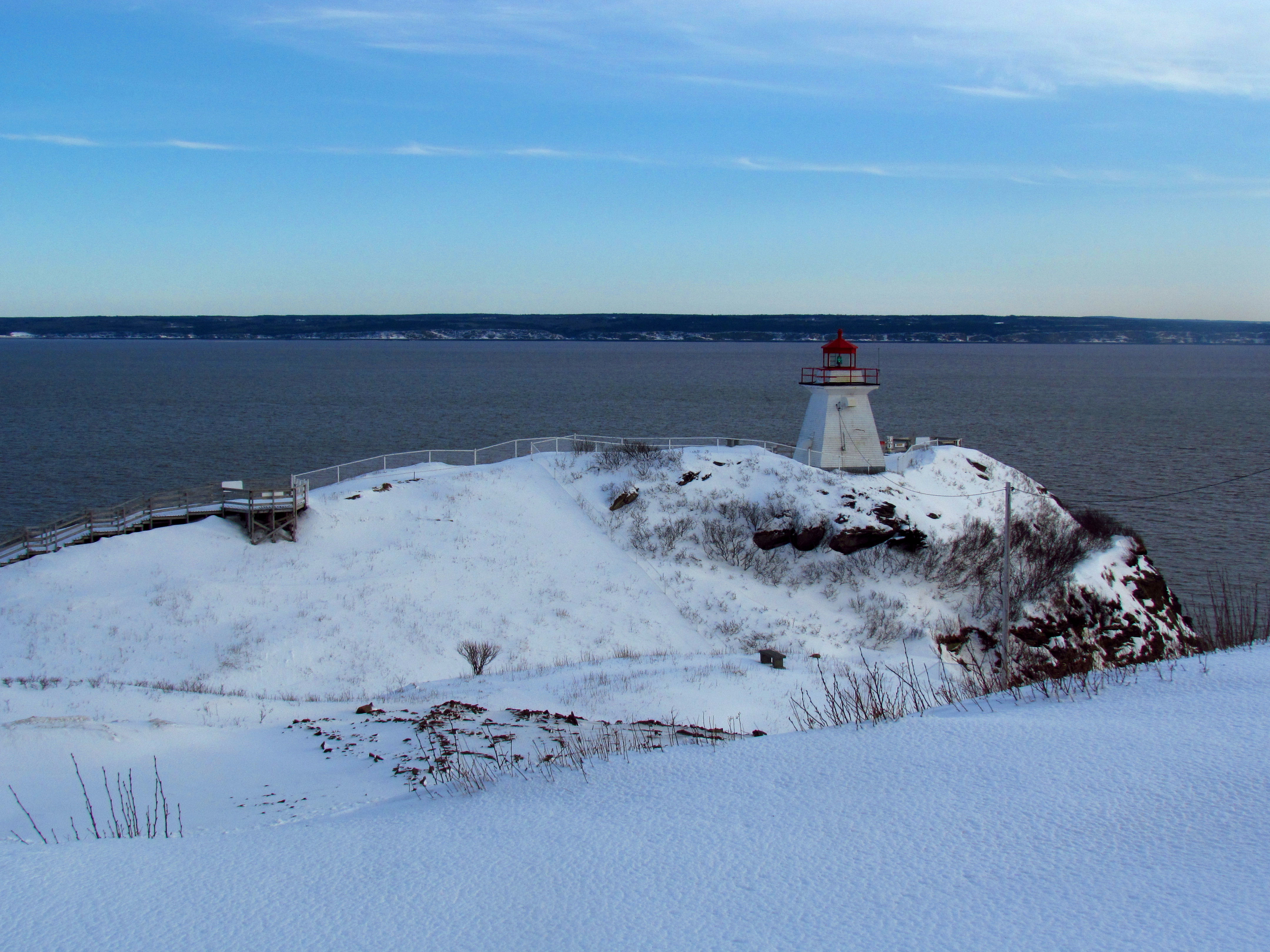
view of lighthouse and Nova Scotia

Acadian sailors made early mention of 'Cap Enragé,' and after the Acadian expulsion, British settlers anglicised the name to Cape Enrage. During the 1820 and 30s, Cape Enrage contested as the location of the first lighthouse in Chignecto Bay, and the site was selected as the preferred location. The lighthouse was completed in 1840. A variety of boathouses and temporary lighthouse keeper's houses were built over the next decades, but were frequently damaged or destroyed in the region's numerous storms and harsh winters. The lighthouse itself was heavily damaged in one storm in the 1840s, and was extensively repaired. The current lighthouse keeper's house dates from 1952.

The lighthouse was automated in the late 1980s by the Canadian Coast Guard, and the last lighthouse keeper, Noel Justison, left the property in 1988. The property quickly began to suffer from neglect and vandalism, and by 1993 all of the buildings except the lighthouse were scheduled for demolition by the government. However, in 1993 a small group of high school students from Moncton, under the supervision of Dennison Tate, their physics teacher, began a restoration project at the site, renovating all of the buildings and slowly turning the site into a tourist destination. From 1993 to 2009 Cape Enrage Interpretive Centre, a not-for-profit, student-run organisation, maintained the property and the students also offered climbing, rappelling, and kayaking in the summer months through the for-profit business, Cape Enrage Adventures. In 1995 the keepers house transferred from the Canadian Coast Guard to Province of New Brunswick along with 4+ acres of land. In the summer of 2004 the Canadian Coast Guard formally transferred ownership of the lighthouse to Cape Enrage Adventures and Cape Enrage Interpretive Centre.

== See also ==
- List of lighthouses in New Brunswick
- List of lighthouses in Canada
