= Petitcodiac, New Brunswick =

Petitcodiac
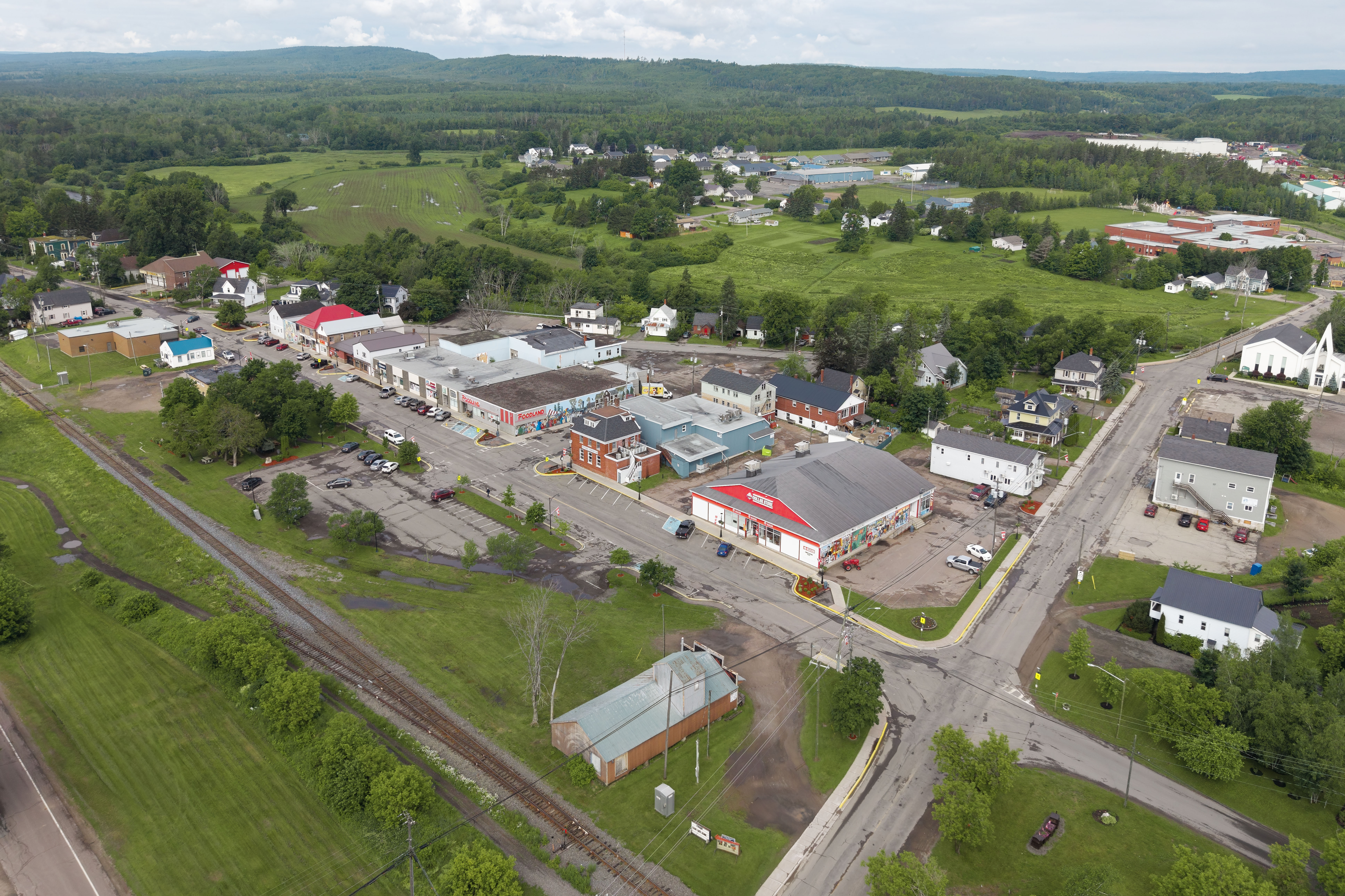
- Downtown Petitcodiac (2026)

- Seal
- Nickname: "Where the River Begins"
- Location within New Brunswick
- Coordinates: 45.93205°N 65.169697°W
- Country: Canada
- Province: New Brunswick
- County: Westmorland County
- Municipality: Three Rivers
- Incorporated Village: November 9, 1966
- Electoral Districts Federal: Fundy Royal
- Provincial: Petitcodiac

Area
  - Land: 17.18 km^{2} (6.63 sq mi)

Population (2021)
  - Total: 1,476
  - Density: 85.9/km^{2} (222/sq mi)
  - Change (2016–21): ▲6.7%
- Time zone: UTC-4 (Atlantic (AST))
  - Summer (DST): UTC-3 (ADT)
- Website: Petitcodiac.ca

Petitcodiac (/pɛ.tɪ.koʊ.di.æk/, sometimes shortened to /pɛ.ti/) is a former village in Westmorland County, New Brunswick, Canada. It held village status prior to 2023 and is now part of the village of Three Rivers.

== History ==
It is named after the Petitcodiac River, which begins in the village at the junction of the North River and Anagance River. The name is believed to be derived either from a Mi'kmaq word meaning "bends like a bow" or from a Wolastoqey word meaning "sound of thunder". Petcoucoyee (Franquelin, 1686); Pacoudiac (deCouagne, 1749); present spelling from mid 19th century.

On 1 January 2023, all or parts of four local service districts were annexed to Petitcodiac as part of the 2023 local governance reforms to establish a new village named Three Rivers. The community's name remains in official use.

== Present day ==
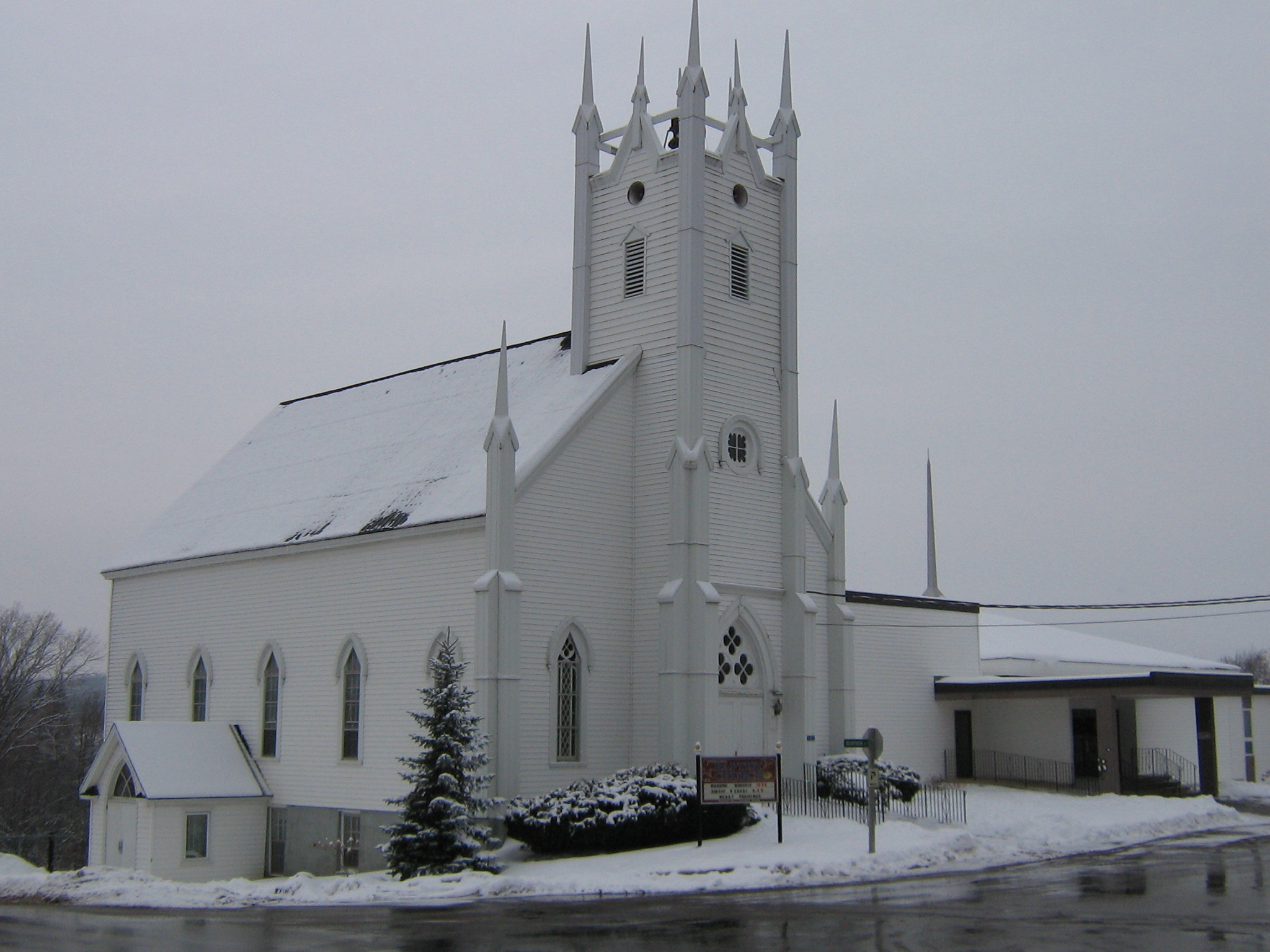
Petitcodiac Baptist Church on the banks of the Petitcodiac River. It was demolished in 2016 and rebuilt (new design) in 2018.

The Community Centres around Route 890, Route 885, Route 905, Route 106 and Route 1.

The village features a regional school, an outdoor swimming pool, an arena, a bowling alley, as well as several family-owned shops and churches servicing the surrounding area. There is also a Royal Canadian Air Cadet Squadron. The town is also home to a monthly community newspaper, the Maritime Motorsports Hall of Fame Local News & Views, which despite its name is not limited to motorsports, and is distributed free to residents and neighboring villages.

The Westmorland County Agricultural Fair, established by William Balzer in 1967, is an agricultural fair with a horse show, a sheep show, a produce contest, crafts and baked goods, and a beauty pageant.

== Demographics ==
In the 2021 Census of Population conducted by Statistics Canada, Petitcodiac had a population of 1,476 living in 609 of its 630 total private dwellings, a change of 6.7% from its 2016 population of 1,383. With a land area of 17.18 km^{2} (6.63 sq mi), it had a population density of 85.9/km^{2} (222.5/sq mi) in 2021.

Population trend

| Census | Population | Change (%) |
|---|---|---|
| 2016 | 1,383 | ▼3.2% |
| 2011 | 1,429 | ▲4.4% |
| 2006 | 1,368 | ▼5.3% |
| 2001 | 1,444 | ▲1.3% |
| 1996 | 1,425 | ▲6.2% |
| 1991 | 1,342 | ▼1.0% |
| 1986 | 1,355 | ▼3.6% |
| 1981 | 1,405 | N/A |

Income (2016)

| Income type | By CAD |
|---|---|
| Median total income per capita | $27,674 |
| Median Household Income | $54,720 |
| Median Family Income | $66,560 |

Mother tongue (2016)

| Language | Population | Pct (%) |
|---|---|---|
| English | 1,340 | 96.8% |
| French | 20 | 1.4% |
| Other languages | 15 | 1.1% |
| English and French | 10 | 0.7% |

== Neighbouring communities ==
- Intervale
- River Glade
- The Glades
- Pollett River
- Anagance
- Hillgrove
- Glenvale

== See also ==
- List of communities in New Brunswick
