= Parkindale, New Brunswick =

Rural community in Canada

Coordinates: 45.866858°N 64.985767°W

Location of Parkindale in New Brunswick

Parkindale is a dispersed Canadian rural community located in the Elgin Parish of Albert County, New Brunswick.

Centered on Route 895, the Parkindale region, along with the Prosser Brook region, is home to the Kent Hills Wind Farm, a large wind farm project.

== See also ==
- List of communities in New Brunswick

== Neighbouring communities ==
- Elgin
- Prosser Brook
