= Prosser Brook, New Brunswick =

Rural community in Canada

Coordinates: 45.8332991°N 64.9499957°W

Location of Prosser Brook in New Brunswick

Prosser Brook is a dispersed Canadian rural community located in the Elgin Parish of Albert County, New Brunswick.

Located approximately 4 km southeast of Parkindale and Route 895, Prosser Brook is home to the Kent Hills Wind Farm, a series of large windmills situated around 10 kilometers southwest of the community.

== See also ==
- List of communities in New Brunswick

== Neighbouring communities ==
- Elgin
- Parkindale
