= Pollett River, New Brunswick =

Community in New Brunswick, Canada

Coordinates: 45.888574°N 65.099316°W

Location of Pollett River in New Brunswick

Pollett River is a Canadian rural community in Westmorland County, New Brunswick. The community centres on the intersection of Route 905 and the south end of Sanitorium Road.

== Places of note ==
The community is best known for the annual event called the Pollett River Run which is held the last weekend in April and involves creating home-made flotation devices and seeing how far they will go down the Pollett River.

== Bordering communities ==
- The Glades, New Brunswick
- Harrison Settlement, New Brunswick
- Forest Hill, New Brunswick
- Elgin, New Brunswick
- Three Rivers, New Brunswick
- Anagance, New Brunswick

== See also ==
- List of communities in New Brunswick
