= Cardwell Parish, New Brunswick =

Cardwell
- Parish
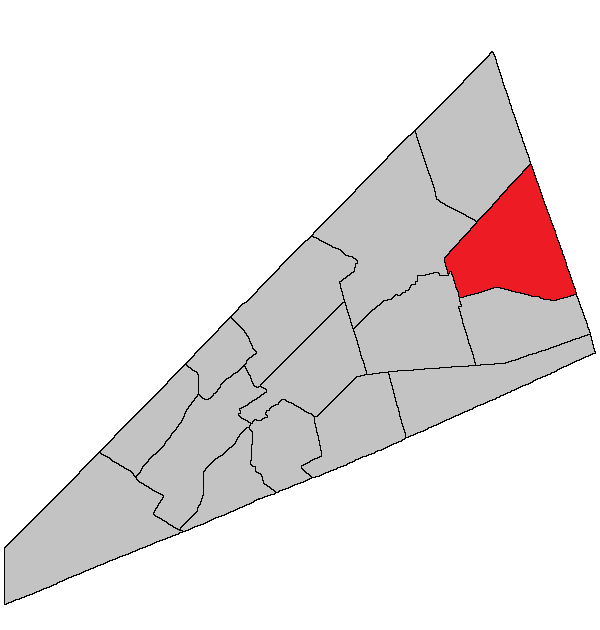
- Location within Kings County, New Brunswick.
- Coordinates: 45.84°N 64.59°W
- Country: Canada
- Province: New Brunswick
- County: Kings County
- Erected: 1874

Area
  - Land: 311.87 km^{2} (120.41 sq mi)

Population (2021)
  - Total: 1,401
  - Density: 4.5/km^{2} (12/sq mi)
  - Change 2016-2021: ▲3.5%
  - Dwellings: 721
- Time zone: UTC-4 (AST)
  - Summer (DST): UTC-3 (ADT)

Cardwell is a geographic parish in Kings County, New Brunswick, Canada, (Note: The Territorial Division Act divides the province into 152 parishes, the cities of Saint John and Fredericton, and one town of Grand Falls. The Interpretation Act clarifies that parishes include any local government within their borders.) located on the eastern border of the county.

For governance purposes, the parish is part of the Kings rural district, which is a member of the Kings Regional Service Commission.

Prior to the 2023 governance reform, it comprised a single local service district, which was a member of Kings Regional Service Commission (RSC8).

The Census subdivision of the same name shares the parish's boundaries.

== Origin of name ==
The parish was named in honour of Viscount Cardwell, British Secretary of State for War until two months before the parish's erection.

== History ==
Cardwell was erected in 1874 from Sussex Parish.

== Boundaries ==
Cardwell Parish is bounded:

- on the northwest by a line beginning at the northeastern corner of a grant to Jacob Smith, about 975 metres north of the junction of Plumweseep Road and Back Road, then running north 66º east (Note: By the magnet of 1840, when declination in the area was about 18º west of north.) to the Westmorland County line;
- on the east by the Westmorland and Albert County lines;
- on the south by a line beginning on the Albert County line at a point on the prolongation of the north line of a grant to Thomas Nicholson on the eastern side of Morton Road, west-southwesterly of Mechanic Lake, then running west-southwesterly along the prolongation and the grant line to the northwestern corner of the grant, then north-northwesterly to the northeastern corner of a grant to David Law on the southern side of the Law Road, then west-southwesterly along grant lines south of the Picadilly Road to the Sussex Parish line, southeast of DeCourcey Lake;
- on the west by a line beginning at a point on the eastern line of a large grant to Elias Snyder, then running northerly along the grant line and its prolongation to the Kennebecasis River, then downstream about 300 metres past the Horton Road to the eastern line of the Jacob Smith grant, then northerly along the grant to the starting point.

== Former local service district ==
The entire parish formed the local service district of the parish of Cardwell, established in 1968 to assess for fire protection. Recreational and sports facilities was added to the assessment in 2012. First aid and ambulance services were listed from 1972 until the description was rewritten in 2012.

== Communities ==
Communities at least partly within the parish;

- Anagance
- Buckley Settlement
- Crockets Corner
- Dunsinane
- Five Points
- Harper Settlement
- Lindys
- McCully
- Mechanic Settlement
- Penobsquis
- Picadilly
- Portage Vale
- South Branch
- Springdale
- Upper Goshen

== Bodies of water ==
Bodies of water (Note: Not including brooks, ponds or coves.) at least partly in the parish:

- Anagance River
- Kennebecasis River
- South Branch
- Mechanic Lake

== Other notable places ==
Parks, historic sites, and other noteworthy places at least partly in the parish.

- Picadilly Mountain Protected Natural Area

== Demographics ==
Revised census figures based on the 2023 local governance reforms have not been released.

=== Population ===
Population trend

Census	Population	Change (%)
2016	1,353	▼4.3%
2011	1,414	▼4.4%
2006	1,479	▼7.0%
2001	1,382	▼2.8%
1996	1,422	▲6.4%
1991	1,337	

=== Language ===
Mother tongue (2016)

Language	Population	Pct (%)
French only	40	2.9%
English only	1,305	96.0%
Both English and French	5	0.4%
Other languages	10	0.7%

== Access Routes ==
Highways and numbered routes that run through the parish, including external routes that start or finish at the parish limits:

- Highways
  - Route 1
- Principal Routes
  - Route 114
- Secondary Routes:
  - Route 895
- External Routes:
  - None

== See also ==
- List of parishes in New Brunswick
