= NBFL =

NBFL may refer to:

- National Bank Financial - acquired by National Bank of Canada
- North Berks Football League
- New Brunswick Federation of Labour
- New Routemaster - London bus initially known as the New Bus for London
