= Petitcodiac =

Petitcodiac may refer to:

- Petitcodiac River, a river in the Canadian province of New Brunswick
- Petitcodiac, New Brunswick, a community within the village of Three Rivers in New Brunswick
- Petitcodiac (electoral district), a riding which elects members to the Legislative Assembly of New Brunswick
