= Midland, New Brunswick =

Midland can refer to one of two places in the Canadian province of New Brunswick:

- Midland, Albert County, New Brunswick
- Midland, Kings County, New Brunswick

== See also ==
- List of communities in New Brunswick
