= Harry N. Jonah =

Canadian politician (1896–1985)

Member of the Legislative Assembly of New Brunswick
- In office 1957–1962
- Constituency: Kings

Personal details
- Born: Harry Nelson Jonah; March 19, 1896 Elgin, New Brunswick
- Died: October 31, 1985 (aged 89) Sussex, New Brunswick
- Party: Progressive Conservative Party of New Brunswick
- Spouse: Pearl Emile Gaunce
- Children: 1
- Occupation: lawyer

Harry Nelson Jonah (March 19, 1896 – October 31, 1985) was a Canadian judge and politician. He served in the Legislative Assembly of New Brunswick as member of the Progressive Conservative party from 1952 to 1962.

Jonah was born in Elgin, New Brunswick. He moved to Sussex in 1911, where his father, W. B. Jonah, practiced law. In 1914, Jonah graduated from Sussex High School and initially attended Mount Allison University where he temporarily halted studies to serve in the Canadian Army in the First World War before returning and graduating in 1920. He graduated with a Law degree in 1923 from University of King's College Law School, and was admitted to the bar in 1924.
