= Eugene R. Steeves =

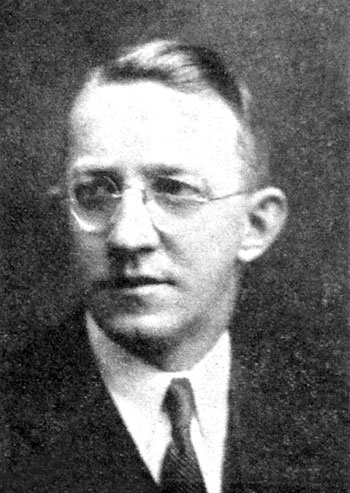
- Born: Eugene Roy Steeves; January 13, 1887; Elgin, New Brunswick, Canada
- Died: December 1, 1952 (aged 65); Saint John, New Brunswick, Canada
- Resting place: Fernhill Cemetery

Eugene Roy Steeves (January 13, 1887 – December 1, 1952) was a Canadian trade unionist and civil servant. He served as the fourth president of the New Brunswick Federation of Labour from 1929 to 1932, after which he served at the New Brunswick Workmen's Compensation Board until his death. Steeves was also active in civic life in Moncton, serving on the school board and later on city council.

== Life and career ==
Eugene Roy Steeves was born on January 13, 1887, in Elgin, New Brunswick, to parents Ralph Steeves and Amanda McCuley. He attended school in Elgin before entering the workforce, working for the Canadian Pacific Railway and the Maine Central Railroad. Beginning in 1912, he spent two decades working as a machinist at Intercolonial Railway shops in Moncton, where he became a member of Local 594 of the International Association of Machinists.

Steeves rose through the ranks of the local union, serving two terms as its president. Beginning in 1920, he served as a delegate to the Moncton Amalgamated Central Labor Union and served as its president for two years. Steeves was involved in civic affairs in Moncton, and in 1920 was appointed to the Moncton school board as a labour representative. In 1931 and 1932, he was elected to the Moncton City Council as an alderman.

Steeves was elected President of the New Brunswick Federation of Labour in 1929 after former president James Tighe stepped down. He was re-elected during the 1930 convention, at which he noted that "Labour now had achieved a position of prominence in the state and in the community". By 1931, as the Great Depression deepened, Steeves warned about rising unemployment, arguing shorter working hours and higher wages would help mitigate the crisis.

In September 1932, Steeves resigned as president to assume a labour position in the Workmen's Compensation Board following the death of James Sugrue in 1930. He served on the board until his death in 1952.

=== Death ===
Steeves died of a heart attack on December 1, 1952, at the General Hospital in Saint John. He was buried at Fernhill Cemetery two days later.
