= Daniel Légère =

Canadian trade unionist (1959–2024)

- Born: March 18, 1959; Chatham, New Brunswick, Canada
- Died: December 26, 2024 (aged 65); Memramcook, New Brunswick, Canada
- Years active: 1980–2024
- Political party: New Democratic

Daniel Légère (March 18, 1959 – December 26, 2024) was a Canadian labour leader from New Brunswick.

== Life and career ==
Daniel Légère was born in Chatham on March 18, 1959, to Alyre and Thérèse (née Basque) Légère he graduated from James M. Hill Memorial High School and briefly served in the Canadian Armed Forces before returning to Chatham. In 1980, he began working as a correctional officer, where he first became a union steward. He was largely involved with the Canadian Union of Public Employees (CUPE) where he held several positions throughout over four decades, including serving as the president of New Brunswick's branch of CUPE from 2005 to 2019. From then, he served as president of the New Brunswick Federation of Labour until his death.

Légère was a longtime member of the New Democratic Party both provincially and federally. In 2017, L'Acadie Nouvelle placed Légère at 19th in their annual list of New Brunswick's top 30 influential Francophones. In August 2024, he received the Owen MacLennan Unionist of the Year Award.

On December 17, 2024, Légère told Brunswick News that he had been found to have inoperable liver cancer as a result of a biopsy and was on extended sick leave. He died in Memramcook on December 26, 2024, at the age of 65. Several political figures such as David Coon, Susan Holt and Jagmeet Singh wrote tributes in response to his death.
