= James L. Sugrue =

Canadian trade unionist (1883–1930)

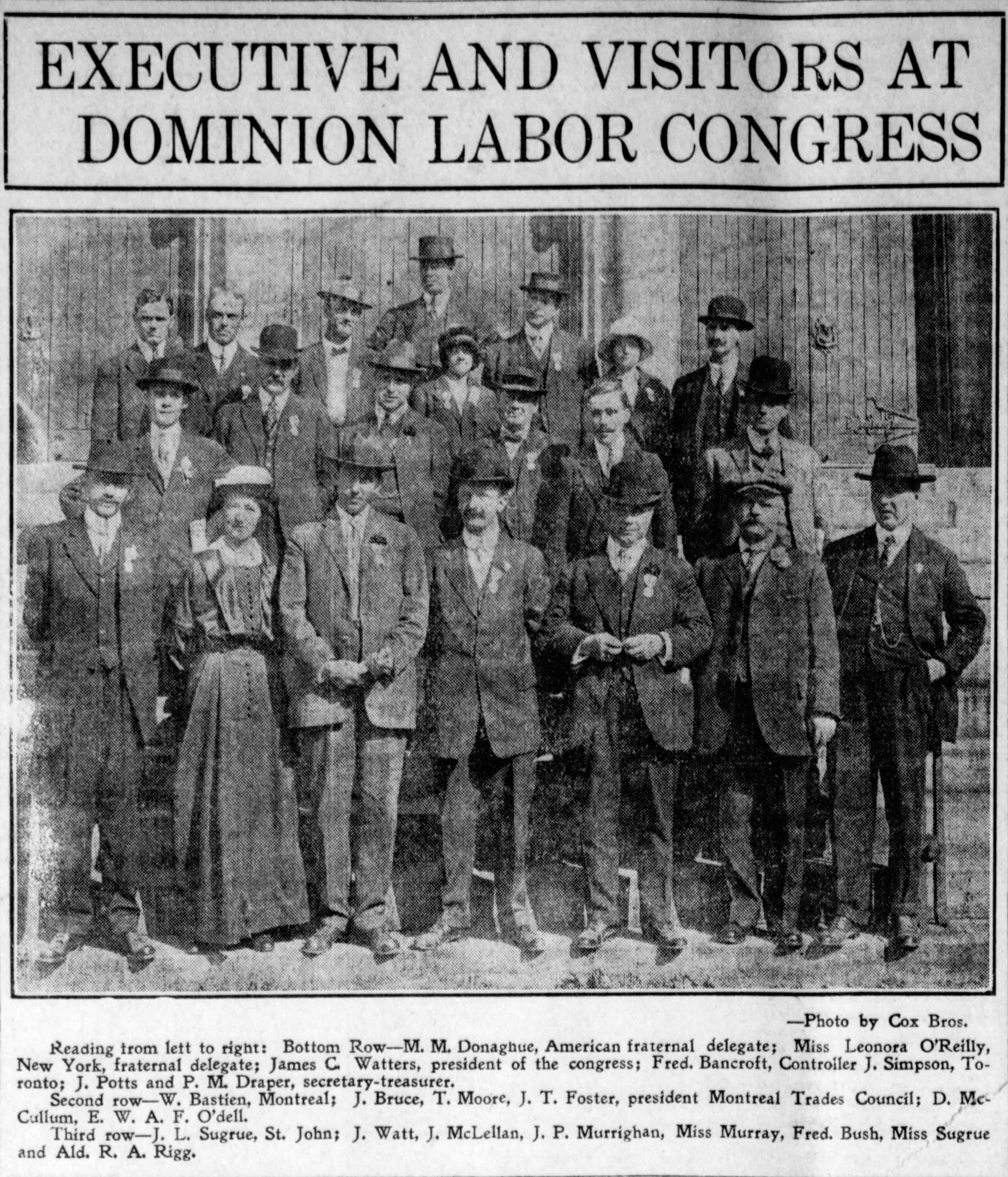
- Sugrue (top row, far left) at the Dominion Labor Congress, 1914
- Born: James Leonard Sugrue; September 1, 1883; Saint John, New Brunswick, Canada
- Died: June 24, 1930 (aged 46); Saint John, New Brunswick

James Leonard Sugrue (September 1, 1883 – June 24, 1930) was a Canadian trade unionist and labour leader who served as the first president of the New Brunswick Federation of Labour from its formation in 1913 until 1918.

== Life and career ==
James Leonard Sugrue was born on September 1, 1883 in Saint John, New Brunswick, to parents James Robert Sugrue and Mary Josephine Driscoll. Sugrue was a descendant of the Republic of Ireland from both of his parents, with his mother being the daughter of Irish immigrants from County Cork and his father himself immigrating from County Kerry. In 1910, Sugrue began serving as financial secretary of Local 919, the Saint John local branch of the United Brotherhood of Carpenters and Joiners of America, and further went on to serve as president of the Saint John Trades and Labor Council. Upon a meeting for the establishment of the New Brunswick Federation of Labour held on September 16, 1913, Sugrue was elected as the union's inaugural president. Among the positions which Sugrue served throughout his career additionally included being a Grand Knight of the Saint John Common Council. Sugrue died on June 24, 1930 in Saint John, after succumbing to an illness he had been battling for over two years.
