= Mapleton, New Brunswick =

Community in Albert County, New Brunswick, Canada

Mapleton
- Unincorporated community
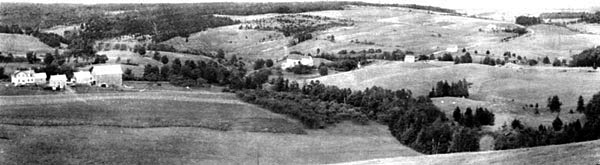
- Panorama view of Mapleton, c. 1925
- Interactive map of Mapleton
- Coordinates: 46°7′56″N 64°49′45″W
- Country: Canada
- Province: New Brunswick
- County: Kings County

Government
  - Type: Local service district
- Time zone: UTC-4 (AST)
  - Summer (DST): UTC-3 (ADT)
- Area code: 506

You may also be looking for Mapleton community in Moncton

Mapleton is a Canadian rural community in Kings County, New Brunswick. Mapleton is on Route 895.

== See also ==
- List of communities in New Brunswick
