= Elgin Parish =

Elgin
- Parish
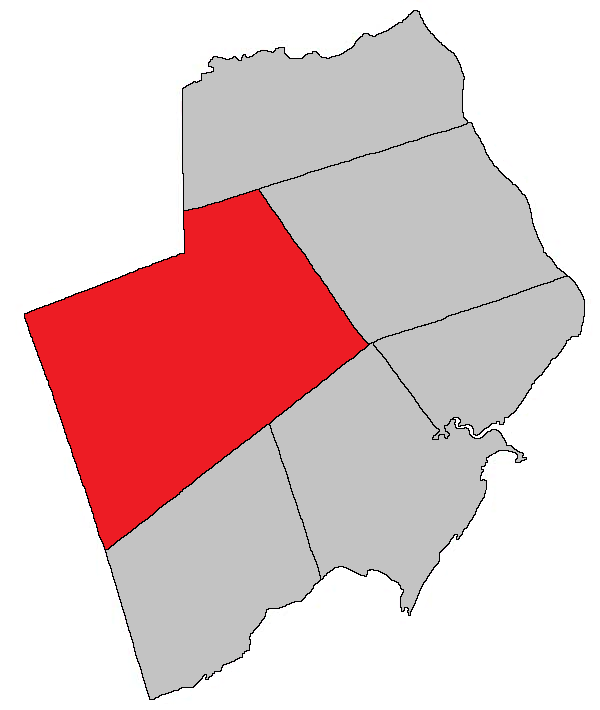
- Location within Albert County.
- Coordinates: 45.89°N 64.83°W
- Country: Canada
- Province: New Brunswick
- County: Albert
- Erected: 1847

Area
  - Land: 519.54 km^{2} (200.60 sq mi)

Population (2021)
  - Total: 1,064
  - Density: 2/km^{2} (5.2/sq mi)
  - Change 2016-2021: ▲19.3%
  - Dwellings: 610
- Time zone: UTC-4 (AST)
  - Summer (DST): UTC-3 (ADT)

Elgin is a geographic parish in the interior of Albert County, New Brunswick, Canada, (Note: The Territorial Division Act divides the province into 152 parishes, the cities of Saint John and Fredericton, and one town of Grand Falls. The Interpretation Act clarifies that parishes include any local government within their borders.) the only one of the county's parishes that does not border either the Bay of Fundy or the Petitcodiac River.

For governance purposes, Elgin is divided between the town of Salisbury, the village of Three Rivers, and the Southeast rural district, all of which are members of the Southeast Regional Service Commission.

Prior to the 2023 governance reform, the parish was divided between two local service districts, Elgin (often called Elgin Centre) and the parish of Elgin.

== Origin of name ==
The parish was probably named in honour of Lord Elgin, who was appointed Governor-General of the Province of Canada in 1847.

== History ==
Elgin Parish was erected in 1847 from the northern part of Harvey Parish.

Located 4.3 km ENE of Goshen: Elgin Parish, Albert County: PO from 1852: in 1866 Elgin was a farming settlement with about 36 families: in 1871 Elgin had a population of 250: in 1898 Elgin was a station on the Elgin, Petitcodiac and Havelock Railway with 1 post office, 6 stores, 3 hotels, 1 sawmill, 1 grist mill, 1 tannery, 1 carriage shop, 1 cheese factory and 2 churches.

== Boundaries ==
Elgin Parish is bounded:

- on the north and northwest by the Westmorland County line, beginning at the Kings County line and running northeasterly then northerly to a point about 3.2 kilometres east of Sanatorium Road and about 4 kilometres south of Middlesex Road, on the prolongation of the northern line of a grant to Albert E. Rogers on the Petitcodiac River, about 120 metres south of the mouth of Stoney Creek, then running northeasterly along the Rogers grant prolongation to a point about 2.6 kilometres east of Little River;
- on the east by the western line of Hillsborough Parish, a line running south 20º east (Note: By the magnet of 1765, when declination in the area was between 14º and 15º west of north. The Territorial Division Act clause referring to magnetic direction bearings was later changed to the problematic wording "by the magnet of the year in which the County or Parish was erected", which ignores lines changed after the erection of the county or parish, before being omitted in the 1952 and 1973 Revised Statutes.) to the prolongation of the south line of a grant to William Carlisle on the Petitcodiac River, then running easterly along the Carlisle prolongation about 500 metres to a point where Elgin, Hillsborough, Harvey, and Hopewell Parishes meet, about 1.35 kilometres north of Lumsden Road;
- on the south by a line running south 72º west (Note: By the magnet of 1847, when declination in the area was between 19º and 20º west of north.) to the Kings County line;
- on the west by Kings County.

== Former local service districts ==
=== Elgin ===
Elgin (informally Elgin Centre) was established on 23 November 1966 to assess for fire protection and street lighting following the abolition of county councils under the new Municipalities Act, comprising an irregular area around the community of Elgin; First aid & ambulance services were added on 14 March 1973.

In 2020, Elgin assessed for street lighting and community & recreation services in addition to the basic LSD services of fire protection, police services, land use planning, emergency measures, and dog control. The taxing authority was 628.00 Elgin Centre.

=== Elgin Parish ===
The local service district of the parish of Elgin (informally Elgin Parish), comprising all of the parish outside Elgin, was also established on 23 November 1966 but only assessed for fire protection. Ambulance service was added on 14 March 1973. In 2020, it assessed for community & recreation services and basic LSD services. The taxing authority was 614.00 Elgin Parish.

== Communities ==
Communities at least partly within the parish;

- Church Hill
- Churchs Corner
- Elgin
- Ferndale
- Forest Hill
- Goshen
- Gowland Mountain
- Harrison Settlement
- Hillside
- Little River
- Mapleton
- Meadow
- Midland
- Parkindale
- Pleasant Vale
- Prosser Brook
- River View
- Ross Corner
- Upper Goshen

== Bodies of water ==
Bodies of water (Note: Not including brooks, ponds, or coves.) at least partly in the parish:

- Kennebecasis River
- Little River (formerly Coverdale River)
  - East Branch Little River
- Pollett River
- Northwest Branch Crooked Creek
- West Branch Turtle Creek
- Blackwood Lake
- Easter Lake
- Wolfe Lake

== Other notable places ==
Parks, historic sites, and other noteworthy places in the parish.

- Cat Road Protected Natural Area
- Fundy National Park
- Mount Tom Protected Natural Area
- Upham Brook Protected Natural Area

== Demographics ==
=== Population ===
Historical census data Elgin Parish, NB
Year	Pop.	±%
1991	933	—
1996	1,027	+10.1%
2001	1,004	−2.2%
2006	973	−3.1%
2011	968	−0.5%
2016	892	−7.9%
2021	1,064	+19.3%

=== Language ===
Mother tongue language (2016)

Language	Population	Pct (%)
French only	35	3.9%
English only	825	92.7%
Both English and French	0	0.0%
Other languages	30	3.4%

== Access routes ==
Highways and numbered routes that run through the parish, including external routes that start or finish at the parish limits:

- Highways
  - Route 910
- Principal Routes
  - None
- Secondary Routes:
  - Route 895
- External Routes:
  - None

== See also ==
- List of parishes in New Brunswick
