= New Brunswick Route 885 =

Highway in New Brunswick, Canada

Coordinates: 45.980979°N 65.284882°W

Route 885

Route information
- Maintained by New Brunswick Department of Transportation
- Length: 25 km (16 mi)

Major junctions
- North end: Route 112 in New Canaan
- Route 2 (TCH) near Havelock
- South end: Route 106 in Three Rivers

Location
- Country: Canada
- Province: New Brunswick

Highway system
- Provincial highways in New Brunswick; Former routes
← Route 880	→ Route 890

Route 885 is a 24.5-kilometre (15.2 mi) long north to south secondary highway in the south-eastern portion of New Brunswick, Canada.

== Route description ==
Most of the route is in Kings County.

The route's northern terminus is in New Canaan at Route 112 on the Canaan River. It travels southeast through Canaan Road and Havelock where it briefly merges with Route 880 near Havelock Airport. The route then passes through a mostly wooded area as it arrives in Kinnear Settlement and crosses Route 2. Route 885 then follows the North River as it enters Intervale, where it heads south where it is known as King Rd. It passes the eastern terminus of Route 890 and ends in Three Rivers at Route 106.
