= New Brunswick Route 890 =

Highway in New Brunswick, Canada

Coordinates: 45.881883°N 65.377579°W

Route 890

Route information
- Maintained by New Brunswick Department of Transportation
- Length: 38 km (24 mi)

Major junctions
- North end: Route 885 in Three Rivers
- South end: Route 1 in Four Corners

Location
- Country: Canada
- Province: New Brunswick

Highway system
- Provincial highways in New Brunswick; Former routes
← Route 885	→ Route 895

Route 890 is a 37.9-kilometre (23.5 mi) long north to south secondary highway in the southern portion of New Brunswick, Canada.

== Route description ==
Most of the route is in Kings County.

The route's northern terminus is in Three Rivers at Route 885, where it crosses the North River and travels southwest through Hillgrove, Cornhill East, and Cornhill. It then follows South Creek through Newtown and Smiths Creek (where it is known as South Creek Rd), and it ends in Four Corners at Route 1.
