= New Brunswick Route 905 =

Highway in New Brunswick, Canada

Coordinates: 45.868527°N 65.010867°W

Route 905

Route information
- Maintained by New Brunswick Department of Transportation
- Length: 17 km (11 mi)

Major junctions
- North end: Route 1 / Route 106 in Three Rivers
- South end: Route 895 in Elgin

Location
- Country: Canada
- Province: New Brunswick

Highway system
- Provincial highways in New Brunswick; Former routes
← Route 895	→ Route 910

Route 905 is a 16.5-kilometre (10.3 mi) long north to south secondary highway in the southern portion of New Brunswick, Canada.

== Route description ==
The route is in Westmorland County and Albert County.

The route's northern terminus is in Three Rivers at the intersection of Route 1 and Route 106. It travels southeast through a mostly treed area then turns south following the Pollett River passing through Pollett River. The route continues south ending in Elgin at Route 895.
