= New Brunswick Federation of Labour =

NBFL
- New Brunswick Federation of Labour
- Founded: 1913; 113 years ago
- Headquarters: Moncton, New Brunswick
- Location: Canada
- Members: 35,000
- Key people: Chris Watson (President)
- Affiliations: CLC
- Website: www.nbfl-fttnb.ca

The New Brunswick Federation of Labour (NBFL) is the New Brunswick provincial trade union federation of the Canadian Labour Congress. In 2019 it reported a membership of more than 35,000.

The current president is Chris Watson, who was elected in May 2025.

== History ==
The New Brunswick Federation of Labour was organized at a meeting of union delegates in Saint John on 16 September 1913, making it the third provincial federation of labour to be established in Canada, after British Columbia and Alberta. James L. Sugrue of Saint John was elected as president. In early 1914 the Federation obtained a charter from the Trades and Labour Congress of Canada. In 1956 delegates voted to join its successor, the Canadian Labour Congress.

The Federation of Labour's first major achievement was a provincial Workmen's Compensation Act (1918), which was based on insurance principles and administered by a board with labour representation. The Federation has a long record of support for social reforms that protect the rights of union members and promote the interests of the province's working class.

The NBFL is composed of unionized workers within the province, having representatives attending its conventions from almost every community in New Brunswick where a labour organization exists. In addition to its growth in size and influence since its beginnings, the Federation has benefited from greater diversity in membership, especially the participation of francophones, women and public sector workers.

The NBFL is now Labour's central voice in New Brunswick. Although the Federation does not directly bargain on behalf of union members, it encourages workers to join to ensure fair and safe workplaces and to build solidarity and mutual support among workers.

== Executive Officers ==
Executive Officers through History
Year(s)	President	Secretary-Treasurer
=== 1913 ===	James L. Sugrue	Neil SAVAGE/P. D. AYER
1914–1918	James L. Sugrue	P. D. AYER
1918–1920	Célime A. MELANSON	George R. MELVIN
1921–1928	James E. TIGHE	George R. MELVIN
1929–1932	Eugene R. Steeves	George R. MELVIN
1933	James A. Whitebone	George R. MELVIN
1934	James E. TIGHE	George R. MELVIN
1935–1953	James A. Whitebone	George R. MELVIN
1954	James A. Whitebone	Lee A. SMITH
1955–1958	James A. Whitebone	William F. MCCARLIE
1959	Angus MACLEOD	James H. LEONARD
1960–1962	James A. Whitebone	Yvon LANCTIN
1963	James A. Whitebone	Valerie BOURGEOIS
1964–1966	John F. MACMILLAN	Valerie BOURGEOIS
1967–1968	Paul LEPAGE	Valerie BOURGEOIS
1969–1972	Paul LEPAGE	Gregory MURPHY
1973–1979	Paul LEPAGE	Alvin G. BLAKELY
1980	Phillip BOOKER	Jean THEBEAU
1981	Larry HANLEY	J. Albert RICHARDSON
1982–1986	Timothy MCCARTHY	J. Albert RICHARDSON
1987–1990	Timothy MCCARTHY	Maurice CLAVETTE
1991–1994	John MCEWEN	Maurice CLAVETTE
1995–1996	Bob HICKES	Maurice CLAVETTE
1997–1998	Tom STEEP	Maurice CLAVETTE
1999–2000	Blair DOUCET	Maurice CLAVETTE
2001–2004	Blair DOUCET	Terry CARTER
2005–2006	Michel BOUDREAU	Terry CARTER
2007–2010	Michel BOUDREAU	Danny KING
2011–2012	Michel BOUDREAU	John GAGNON
2013–2014	Patrick COLFORD	John GAGNON
2015–2019	Patrick COLFORD	Charles ROUSE
?–2024	Daniel Légère	
2025–present	Chris Watson	Nicholas Maltais
