= New Brunswick Route 895 =

Highway in New Brunswick, Canada

Coordinates: 45.868527°N 65.010867°W

Route 895

Route information
- Maintained by New Brunswick Department of Transportation
- Length: 57 km (35 mi)

Major junctions
- North end: Route 112 in Five Points
- South end: Route 1 in Anagance

Location
- Country: Canada
- Province: New Brunswick

Highway system
- Provincial highways in New Brunswick; Former routes
← Route 890	→ Route 905

Route 895 is a 56.9-kilometre (35.4 mi) long north to south secondary highway in the southern portion of New Brunswick, Canada.

== Route description ==
The route's northern terminus is in Five Points at Route 112. It follows a river and travels southeast to Price, Synton, Colpitts Settlements, Little River, and Parkindale. The route then turns southeast through Forest Hill and Pleasant Vale and it passes Gowland Mountain. It continues through Mapleton to the southern terminus of Route 905. The route then passes through Elgin, Midland, and Goshen, where it turns north-east towards Portage Vale and ends in Anagance at Route 1.
