= Kent Hills Wind Farm =

Coordinates: 45°48′20″N 64°53′45″W

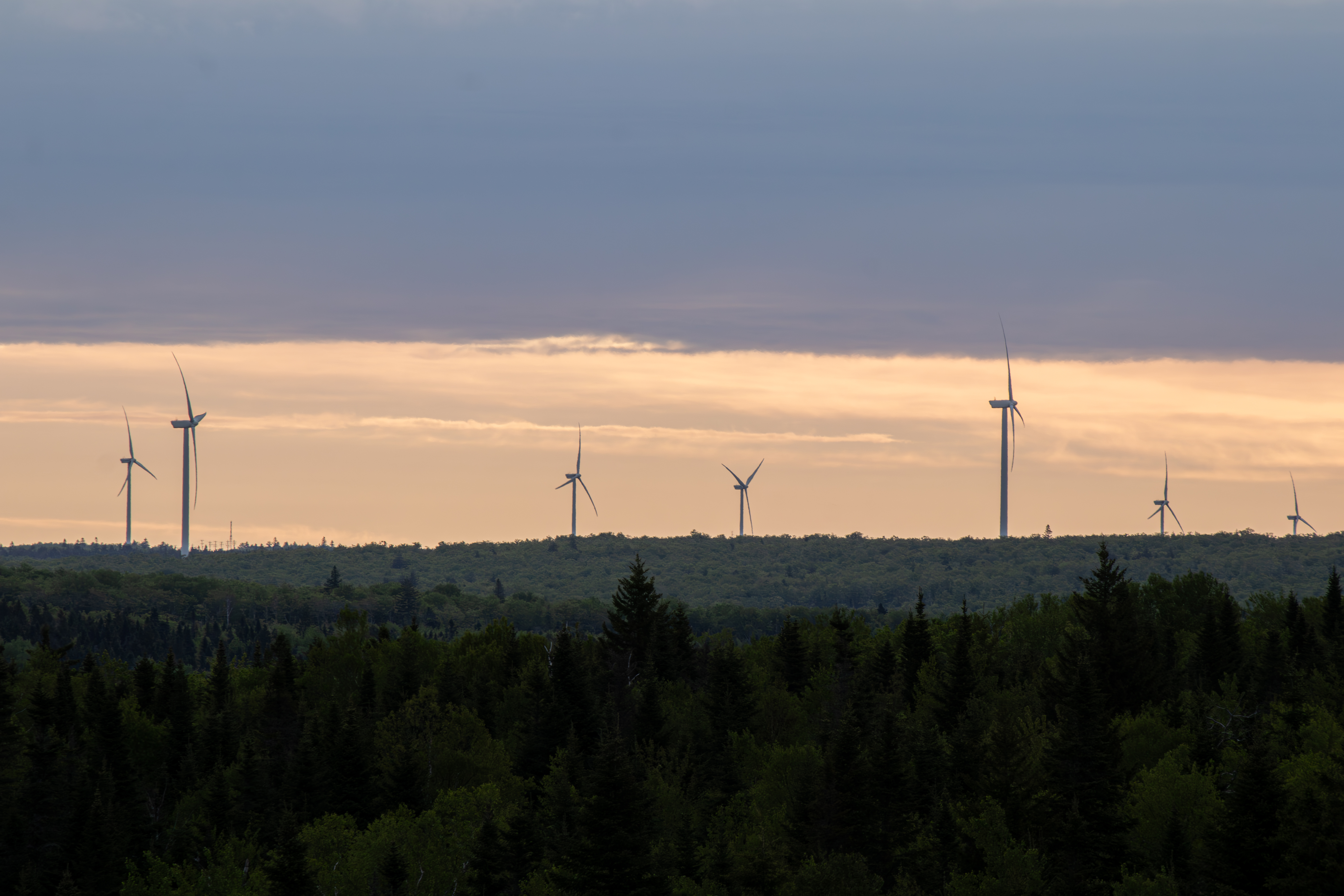
Some of the farm's turbines, seen from Collier Mountain

Kent Hills Wind Farm is a wind farm located southeast from Prosser Brook, New Brunswick. The wind farm was completed in three phases between 2008 and 2018. The farm was the first in New Brunswick. It is owned and operated by TransAlta and the power is purchased by NB Power for supply to consumers.

As of 2021, the farm consisted of forty-nine 3-megawatt (MW) wind turbines and 5 3.45-MW turbines, for a total capacity of 167 MW. The project produces 580,000 megawatt hours per year. The turbines used are Vestas V90-3MW model, which have a rotor diameter of 90 metres (295 ft) and sit atop an 90-metre (295 ft) tower.

In October 2021, a tower, in phase two of the project, collapsed because of a bad foundation. Initially all WTG were taken off line as a precaution. TransAlta Renewables have found deficiencies in the design of all of the windmill foundations. Costs to replace them are quoted to be 75-100 million dollars.

It is the largest wind farm in Atlantic Canada.

== See also ==
- List of wind farms in Canada
