= Elgin, New Brunswick =

Elgin
- Unincorporated rural village
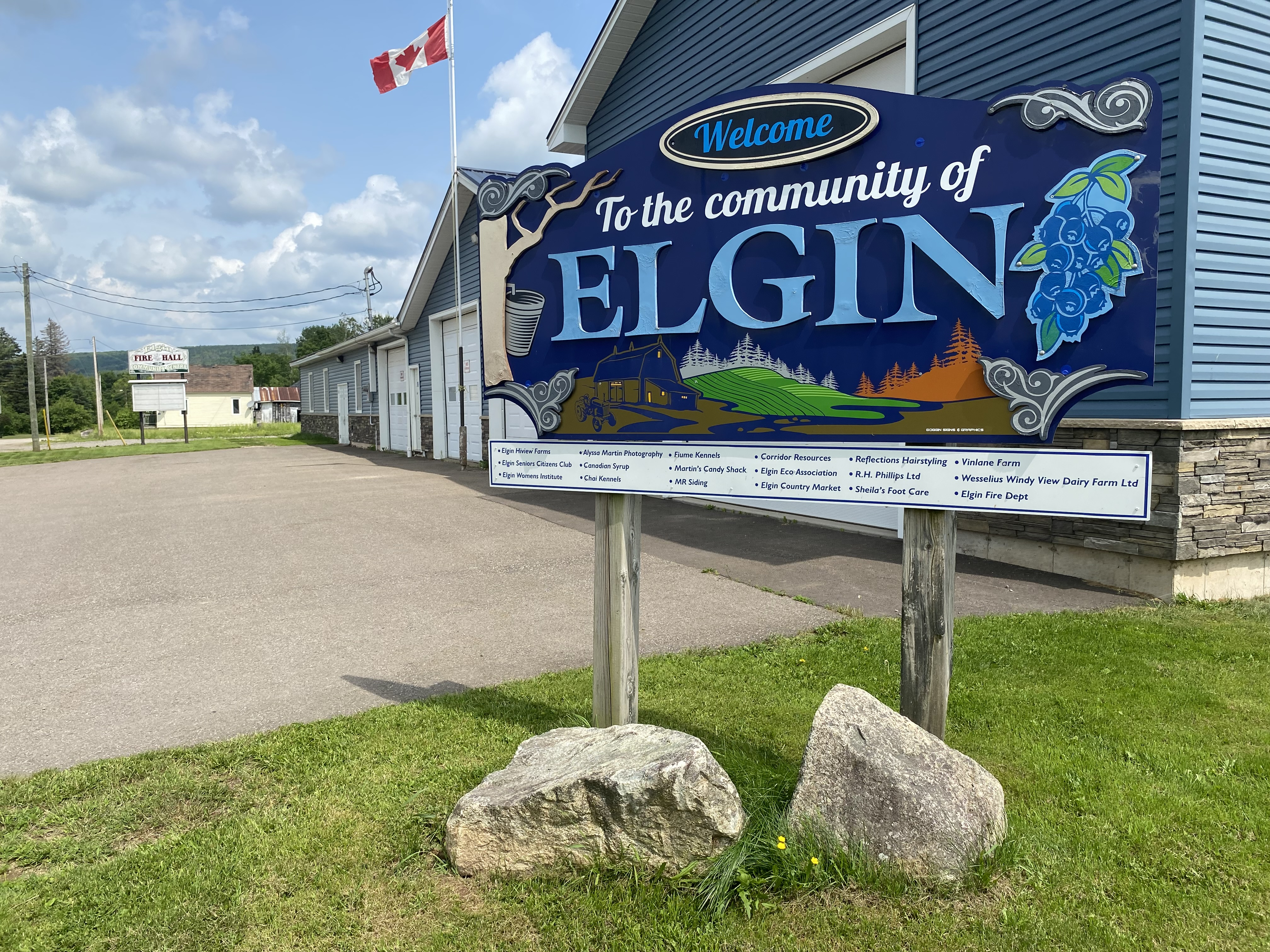
- Elgin's welcome sign located in the main, or "Four Corners" area

- Location of Elgin within New Brunswick
- Coordinates: 45°47′50″N 65°6′33″W
- Country: Canada
- Province: New Brunswick
- County: Albert
- Parish: Elgin
- Founded: 1811
- Founder: John Geldart
- Named for: James Bruce, 8th Earl of Elgin
- Electoral Districts Federal: Fundy Royal
- Provincial: Albert

Area
  - Land: 4.29 km^{2} (1.66 sq mi)

Population (2021)
  - Total: 213
  - Density: 49.7/km^{2} (129/sq mi)
  - Change (2011-16): ▲4.9%
- Time zone: UTC-4 (AST)
  - Summer (DST): UTC-3 (ADT)
- Postal code(s): E4Z
- Area code: 506
- Highways: Route 895
- Website: https://threeriversnb.ca/

Elgin, sometimes referred to as Elgin Centre, is a small unincorporated rural village located in Albert County, New Brunswick, Canada. It was first settled in 1811 by John Geldart, followed by other pioneers in subsequent years. The heart of Elgin is situated at the "Four Corners", which refers to the intersection of Route 895, River Road, and Gowland Mountain Road. In the past, this central part of Elgin housed various businesses such as stores, small shops, hotels, factories, as well as a race track. Presently, the sole remaining establishment at the Four Corners is a combined general store and restaurant. Prior to the 2023 New Brunswick local governance reform, Elgin was categorized as a local service district. It is now part of the village of Three Rivers.

Elgin is situated in the western part of the county and within the western part of Elgin Parish, where it is located. It is approximately 15 kilometres (9.3 mi) south of the former village of Petitcodiac (now part of Three Rivers), intersecting past Route 895 and the south ending of Route 905.

== Toponymy ==
The area that would later become Elgin was first known to the pioneering settlers as the Upper Settlement, as it was situated up the Pollett River from the Glades and Forest Glen (previously known as American Mill Village) settlements. Originally, the region known today as Elgin was a part of Salisbury Parish, which in itself was a part of Westmorland County. However, with the establishment of Albert County from Westmorland County, a new parish was formed called Elgin Parish, named in honor of James Bruce, 8th Earl of Elgin, who served as the Governor-General of the Province of Canada at the time. When Elgin was founded as a village in 1847, it adopted the name of the parish as its own.

== History ==
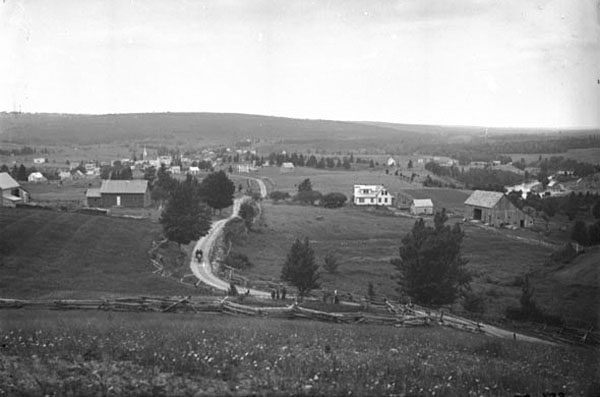
Elgin, c. 1900

=== Indigenous period and early settlement ===
Before European settlement in New Brunswick, the Elgin area had originally been traversed by the Mi'kmaq, who, from spring to fall, hunted and gathered in the region for possibly thousands of years. However, the land remained unsettled until 1811 when John Geldart, a 32-year-old immigrant from Yorkshire, England, constructed his house there. Geldart recognized the farming potential of the level meadows and fertile land, which led him to choose this location for settlement, upon his arrival after travelling upriver. Prior to Geldart's arrival, several farms were already being cleared and cultivated along the Pollet River, extending up to the village of Forest Glen. In 1812, following Geldart's settlement, other pioneers followed suit and arrived in the area, clearing forests and establishing their homes.

Many of Elgin's early settlers arrived from other parts of the province, with a significant amount coming from the Alma area. The settlement's mountainous geography attracted Irish and Scottish farmers. In the early days of settlement, it was likely common practice to seek higher ground to avoid early frosts in the region. Consequently, the hills were heavily farmed, while the farmers built their homes in the valleys. The area from Forest Glen to Elgin was originally lined with large pine trees on both banks of the river, which early settlers utilized by hollowing out their trunks to create canoes for transporting provisions.

During the initial years of settlement, the pioneers were preoccupied with building homes, gathering fuel for harsh winters, clearing land for agriculture, and obtaining food from the forests and streams. Salmon, which migrated up the river as far as "Pollett River Falls," were caught in substantial quantities and dried or salted. Grouse were also abundant in the more open valley and were smoked, salted, or preserved in fat for winter consumption. Clearing and preparing the forested land for cultivation was challenging, as every quarter acre required clearing and removing roots. However, once the settlers established their way of life, they turned their attention to producing marketable goods.

Elgin's earliest settlers, joined by individuals from other parts of the county, initiated the region's maple sugar industry. The hills surrounding the valley, which was being settled and farmed, were covered with large maple trees, which settlers used to produce sugar and ship it down the river in pine canoes. Although some historical records suggest that maple sugar production in the area dates back to the early 1800s, the Mi'kmaq peoples were the first to produce the earliest kind of maple candy here by pouring boiled-down sap over snow.

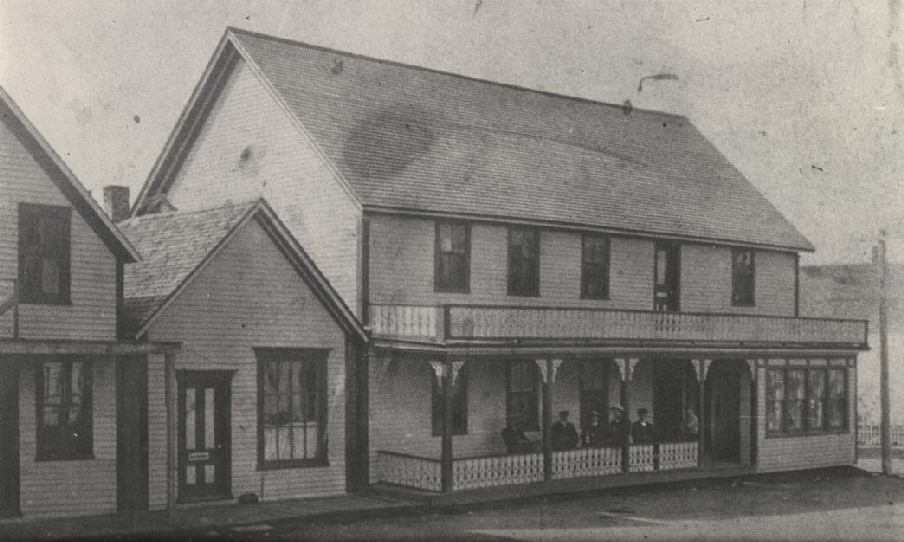
The Garland Hotel, owned and operated by John and Rachel Garland, 1907.

Nearly twenty years after the arrival of the first settlers, an Englishman named George Gowland came to Elgin with his family to farm. Observing how early frosts damaged crops, particularly buckwheat, in the valley, he chose to settle on a mountain in 1828. This mountain now bears his name as Gowland Mountain.

James and Peter Geldart, the sons of John, the first settler, later cleared farms and settled along the road between Elgin and Goshen. In 1835, James and Peter, along with their brother-in-law John Perry, founded the Midlands settlement. They were joined by Michael and Solomon Geldart and Thomas Hopper. Although the land in this area was partly open, the soil was less fertile compared to other established communities. Around 1847, a significant influx of Irish immigrants occurred due to the Great Famine. At one point, around 100 families had been settled in New Ireland, located a couple kilometers away from Elgin. However, much like the other settlements in the area of Gowland Mountain, Forest Glen, and Mapleton, New Ireland is now empty, and Elgin no longer serves as the shopping and service hub for these regions.

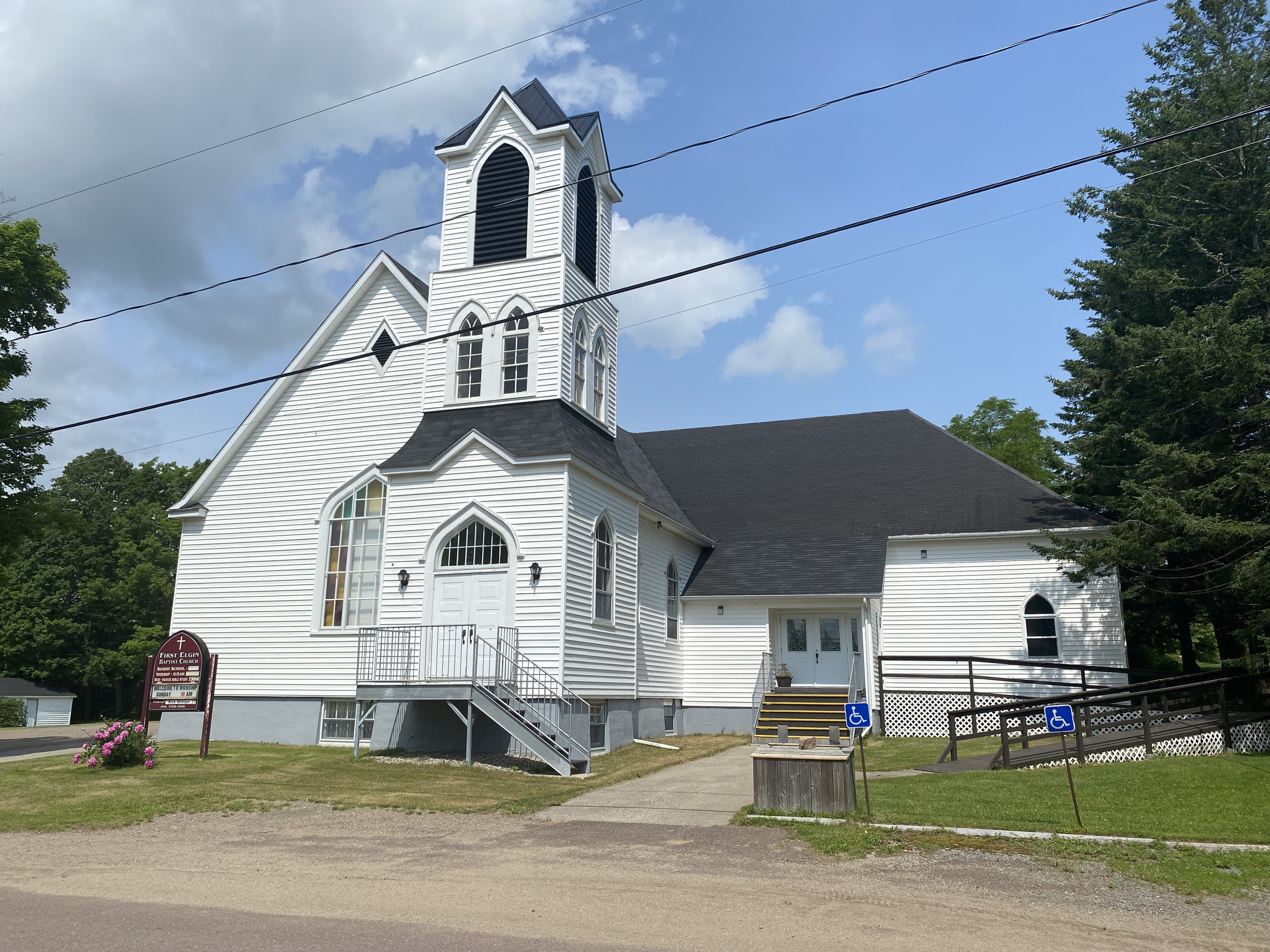
The First Elgin Baptist Church, built after the original church in Elgin was destroyed by fire

The first church in Elgin was a Baptist church, organized in 1835 by Rev. Joseph Crandall, who served as the pastor of the Salisbury Baptist Church at the time. Initially, the Elgin United Baptist Church held its meetings held in homes or a school, if available. The first church building was constructed near the present location of the Old Elgin Cemetery. This original First Elgin Baptist Church was a log cabin in 1839. A small log schoolhouse, the first of which made in Elgin, was built on a hill near the church, later being relocated. In 1870, a new church was erected at the current site, established by Rev. Joseph Crandall. On April 28, 1937, the church was destroyed by fire due to an overheated furnace pipe while the church was being warmed up for a funeral service. However, the community rallied together, and within two weeks, the basement of a new building was nearly complete. The new church was dedicated in July 1938, at a cost of approximately $3,500 - $4,000, with contribution from the local community and surrounding area. Elgin's post office opened in 1852, with the first postmaster being J. Robinson.

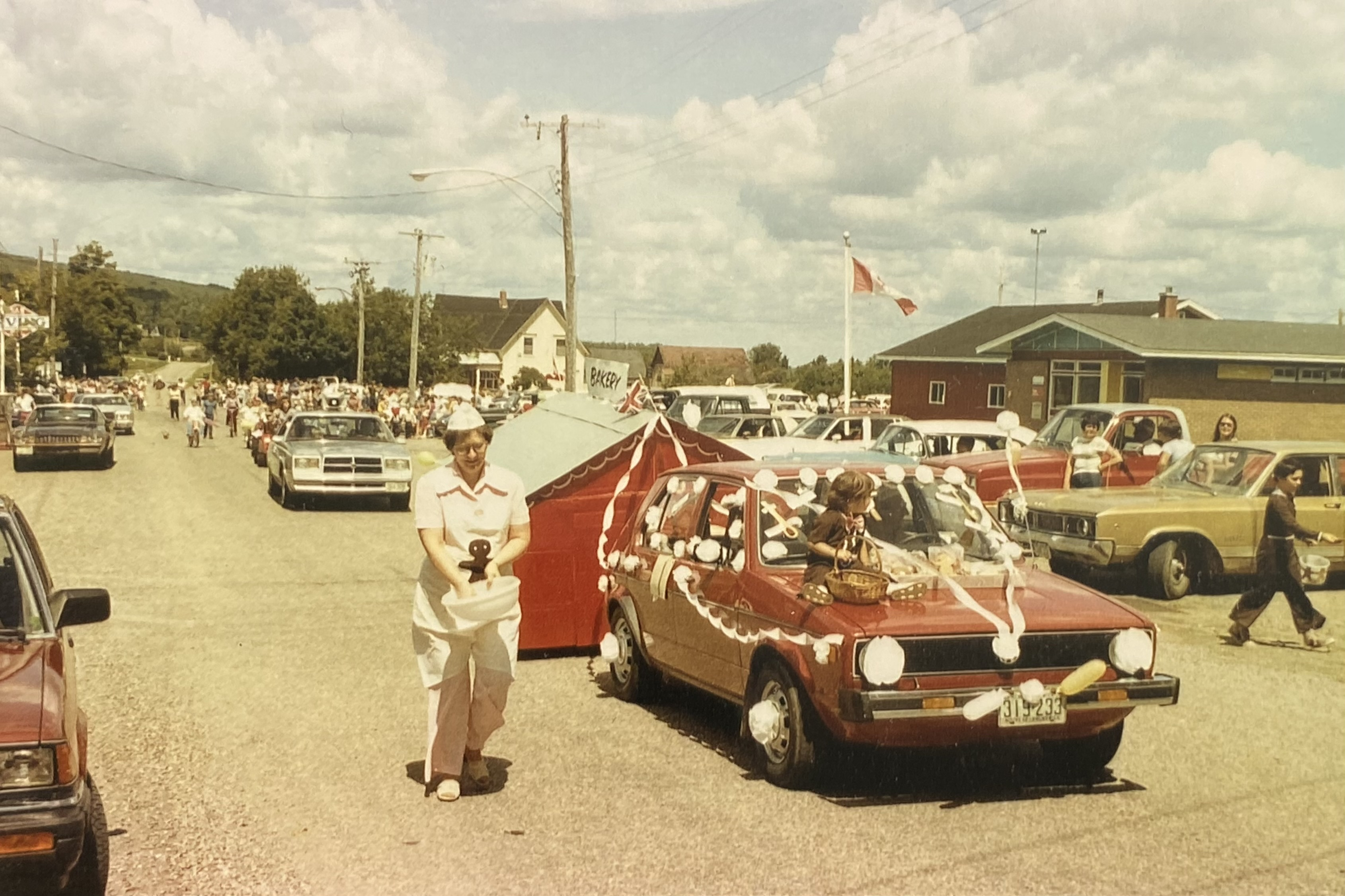
Elgin in the 1980s

Elgin's first store was under ownership and operation by David and Frederick Steeves. Following Frederick's death, the business was taken over by David and his brother, Joseph. The partnership was later joined by LeBaron Goddard and, with the business being moved to Elgin "corner", sitting on Goddard's lot, the general store operated under the name Steeves Bros. and Goddard. The establishment remained successful in the subsequent years, eventually with Goddard's sons taking management, operating under the name "Goddard Brothers". In 1911, the business was destroyed by fire. Elgin also had a carriage shop, known as the Webster Carriage Factory.

=== Elgin's railway system ===
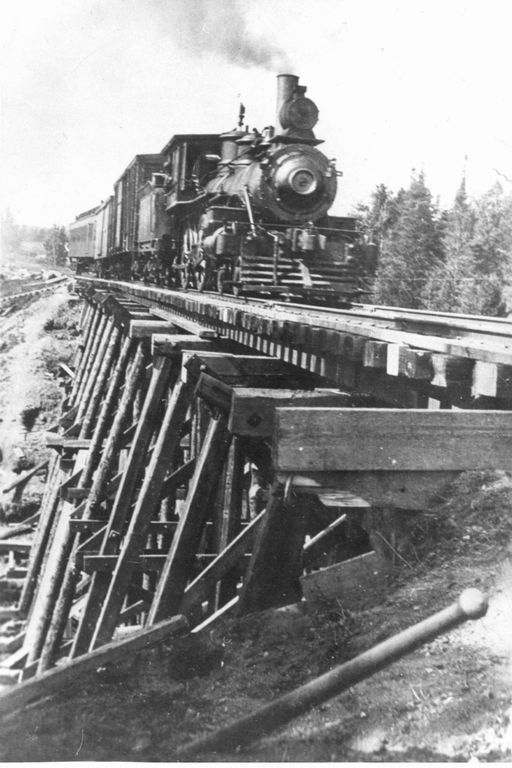
Elgin & Havelock engine, Intervale, New Brunswick, c. 1917

==== Pre-railway history ====
Elgin's utilization of a railway began as a concept in 1853, with the initiation of the European and North American Railway (later replaced by the Intercolonial Railway). The railway's development brought economic prosperity to nearby Petitcodiac when a section connecting Shediac to Saint John via Petitcodiac was opened. The presence of a railway in Elgin was considered vital for transporting goods and promoting economic growth. The prospect gained more excitement in 1875, with various groups such as lumbermen, manufacturers, farmers, and merchants anticipating the benefits it would bring. Initially, the plan was for Alma Parish to be the railway's destination, with the last stop being at the Bay of Fundy, but the challenging terrain made it impractical. An alternative route from Petitcodiac to Elgin was then proposed by a group of businessmen, leading to the incorporation of the Elgin Petitcodiac Branch Railway Company. This company obtained permission to construct and operate the railway, connecting Elgin to the European and North American Railway. According to the Charter, construction was expected to begin in 1875 and be completed by November 1878. Charles Hallett surveyed the route and oversaw the construction of the railbed, which spanned 14 miles (23 km) long. An adequate number of passenger cars, freight cars, snow ploughs, hand cars, express, rail and baggage cars were agreed to be provided by the Elgin Petitcodiac Branch Railway Company, who would ensure their maintenance and good working order.

==== Completion and early usage ====
To finance the project, $10,000 was invested by the Elgin Petitcodiac Railway Company for rolling stock, while a subsidy of $48,000 was offered by the government. Additionally, the project's expenses were covered by taxes imposed on the taxpayers of Elgin Parish. After a favorable vote from the electorate, the Albert County Session of 1875 passed legislation allowing the parish to levy a $13,000 tax on itself, placing the parish in debt that would be paid off within fifteen years. To additionally support the railway line, the Dominion government provided a special supplement. Subsequently, the railway was constructed and commenced operations.

Completed in 1876, the railway, nicknamed 'The Prong', was considered to have the highest number of curves per mile compared to any other existing rail lines. When the line connecting Elgin to Petitcodiac opened, the leaseholder provided free rides between Elgin and Petitcodiac throughout the day. The railway attracted hundreds of excursionists, who enjoyed the journey from seats mounted on flat cars. On September 14, 1876, The Chignecto Post predicted that the railway would invigorate and increase the value to Elgin's agricultural products, as well as bring progress to the village's real estate. In Elgin, a turntable facilitated the movement of locomotives, and the Elgin station house served multiple purposes, functioning as an office, warehouse, and dwelling. A gravity-fed water tank was located nearby. Additionally, Forest Glen, another stop along the railway, had a flag station constructed. Both the Elgin and Forest Glen stops housed large lumber yards. In the early days, wood served as the reliant source of fuel for the trains, with stacks of wood placed along the right-of-way. However, this posed challenges when, especially during heavy snowfall, the train would sometimes run out of fuel before reaching the supply pile. In such situations, it has been said that the crew would resort to taking wood from farmers' fences, woodpiles, or trees to ensure the train reached the next station. Later on, coal and diesel replaced wood as fuel sources. The train transported goods daily, emitting black clouds of smoke as it ran.

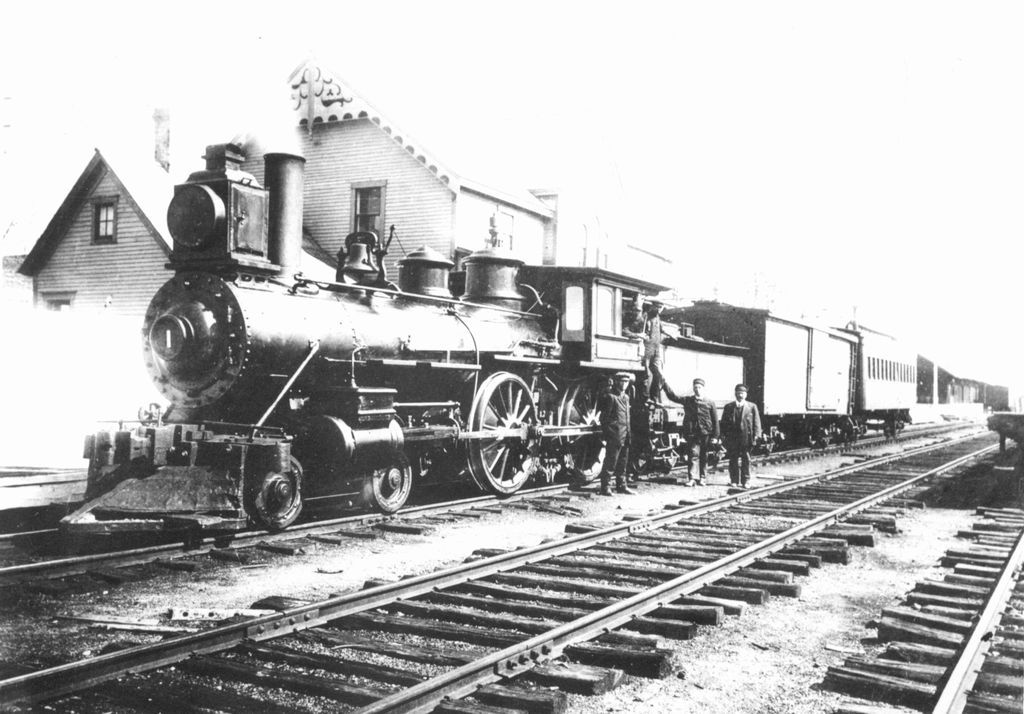
Elgin & Havelock engine, Petitcodiac, New Brunswick, c. 1903

==== Impact on Elgin and later history ====
Elgin flourished into a thriving community, witnessing the establishment of new industries such as spool, butter tubs, and cheese manufacturing. Annually, special runs were organized for those who visited the Agricultural Fair as well as harness racing events. Salesmen often stopped at one of Elgin's multiple hotels for the night, and the registry revealed that Elgin was also a stopover for prominent individuals of the time. For instance, boxer John L. Sullivan was recorded on an August 30, 1899 entry. Additionally, Sir W. Laurier's entry was recorded as he passed through with some friends from Quebec. From the year ending June 1885, $5,715.32 was made from passenger traffic, freight, mails and express services. Additionally, $4,287.02 was recorded from financial records. Elgin exported various products, including manganese, Christmas trees, beef, potatoes, apples and ships' timber. In 1937, a single company alone shipped over one thousand carloads of pulpwood to the United States. However, the railway eventually started encountering problems, including disruptions due to maintenance issues such as burst pipes, snow blockages, and derailments, although no major accidents occurred. Public complaints started to arise, expressing disappointment with the company's decision to lease the railway to Hallett for a period of 99 years, leading some to believe that it had been given away. By the late 1870s, the railway's tax started losing popularity, prompting the parish to seek greater control. During an 1877 election, tax collection became a significant concern, resulting in the election of candidates who opposed it. However, no evidence suggests that these elected officials took any action. By 1882, only two-thirds of the tax had been collected.

The railway was later extended beyond Petitcodiac to include Havelock. A survey was conducted, and with a $36,000 grant, the construction of a track measuring 12.5 miles (20.1 km), including the construction of one bridge, began. In Havelock, a station was built, and in 1885 the line opened. Charles Hallet initially served as the manager, later being succeeded by Amos Killam. In 1894, the company sold the railway for $40,000 to an English company. Over the years, the "Prong" continued to operate between Petitcodiac and Havelock. In 1919, the line was bought by the Dominion Government, operating it in connection with the Canadian Government. The roadbed was improved as it had deteriorated, which resulted in only locomotives that were lightweight with reduced speeds in being allowed for usage. In the fall of 1922, a fire originating from a lumber yard destroyed the station, taking eight months until a new station became available. In the meantime, a makeshift office was made using a car on a siding until a new station was admitted, being transported on a flat car. The schedule was reduced as the volume of transported goods gradually decreased, and the Elgin area started experiencing a decline in its lumber industry, as rubber-wheeled transportation proved to be more convenient. The railway's abandonment was authorized by the Federal Board of Transportation Commission, due to its high costs. In 1955, the station was loaded onto a flat car and sent to Moncton, and subsequently, the train tracks were removed.

=== Butter and cheesemaking in Elgin ===
Before the advent of factory creameries, farmers took the task of producing their own butter and occasionally cheese to meet the needs of their households. Any surplus they generated would either be stored or exchanged with local merchants or neighbors. Butter was prepared during the summer months and stored in tubs for the winter, as milk production was lower during that time.

William Webster established the first cheese factory in the Elgin region, being situated near the Elgin School where the Tub Factory had once stood. Farmers would bring milk to and from the factory for separation, as they had lacked separators at the time. In 1904, Webster set up machinery for butter production but decided to sell the business, which included the land, building, and all the machinery used in butter and cheese production, to the Elgin Dairy Company the following year. As the industry was taken over by the farmers, they made improvements such as raising the structure as well as reconstructed the icehouse. Additionally, they purchased extra equipment for butter manufacturing. In 1905, 56 farmers supplied cream to the factory. However, this number dwindled to just 13 by 1925. That same year, the factory produced 9,540 pounds (4,330 kg) of butter, then dropped down to producing 6,700 pounds (3,000 kg) the following year. During this period, the factory also produced ice cream for a local summer camp. Eventually, the butter production operations were relocated to a creamery housed in a barn owned by T. A. Goggin, with Nelson Tait serving as the buttermaker.

Another cheese factory in Elgin was established in 1903 by John Friers. Given that two workers were described as "buttermakers for Mr. Friers" in the Albert Journal newspaper, the production of butter may have also been practiced. Eventually, factory operations ceased and it was refurbished into a residence, which it remained as until a fire destroyed it around 1960.

The Elgin Cheese Factory was built behind the Women's Institute Hall around 1941, with local shares being sold. Farmers utilized their own cream separators to provide their own cream by this time. Around 40 farmers delivered cream to the factory frequently, storing it in clean, cool containers. The Elgin Cheese Factory had five cheesemakers, with Mr. Aubrey Smith serving as the president and Mrs. Doris Goddard as the secretary. The Family Herald and Weekly Star featured the factory in an article about cheesemaking on October 21, 1952. Around then, the factory produced five cheeses daily, using 5,000 pounds (2,300 kg) of milk, which were then shipped to the New Brunswick Cheese Board. The factory, however, closed operations in 1960.

== Demographics ==
In the 2021 Census of Population conducted by Statistics Canada, Elgin had a population of 213 living in 88 of its 99 total private dwellings, a change of 4.9% from its 2016 population of 203. With a land area of 4.29 km^{2} (1.66 sq mi), it had a population density of 49.7/km^{2} (128.6/sq mi) in 2021.

According to a 1926 school essay on Elgin's history, the village had a population of around 300 at the time. Elgin's population was set at approximately 400 in 1998.

== Education ==
=== Early history ===
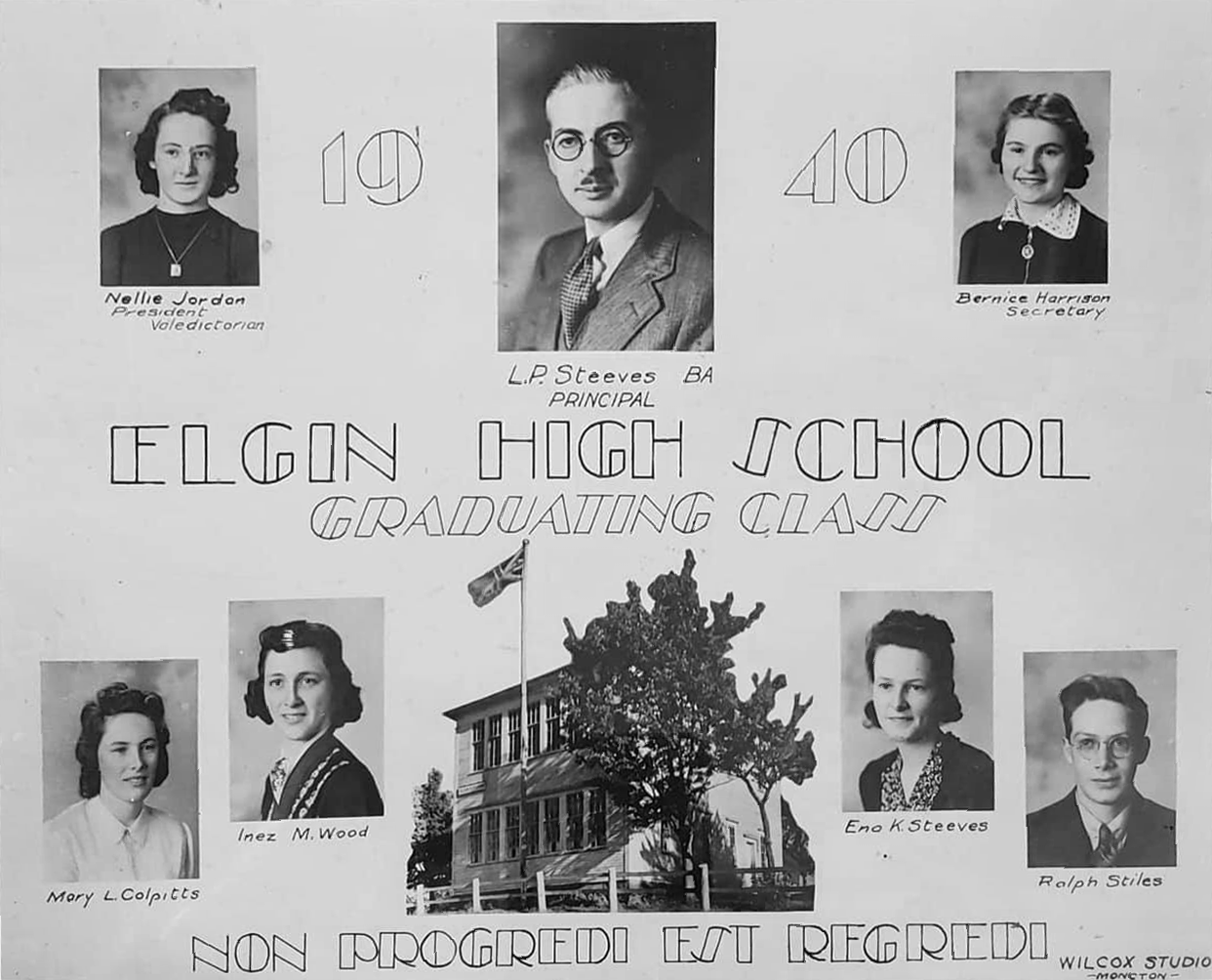
Elgin High School graduates, 1940

During the late 1800s to the mid-1900s, Elgin residents attended the Elgin Superior School, a building constructed in 1885. This institution consisted of three departments, serving students from grades 1-12. The Elgin High School, one of these departments, graduated just six students in 1940. In late 1929, the schools were closed due to a diphtheria outbreak. Furthermore, in early 1930, a scarlet fever outbreak in the Elgin school resulted in multiple homes being placed under quarantine. On March 9, 1945, the Elgin Superior School was destroyed by fire. Consequently, classes were held in various locations, including a residence, the second floor of a store, as well as the First Elgin Baptist Church basement, until a new and much larger school was built in 1947 and later opened in February 1948.

The new school was designed as a single-story building with four classrooms, each accommodating three grades. It featured a basement with a kitchen and an auditorium equipped with a stage. Compared its predecessor, the new school offered more contemporary facilities, including a large furnace and bathrooms, which were significant upgrades from the Elgin Superior School, which relied on box stoves for heating and had only outhouses.

To accommodate the increasing number of students arriving by bus following the closure of smaller schools in more remote areas, two more classrooms were added in 1951. Initially, a resident from the area used their own blue panel truck as a makeshift "bus" until the Parish provided a conventional yellow school bus which, however, was windowless, occasionally leading to uncomfortable temperatures inside the bus. In 1952 the new school, then named "Elgin Academic School," was not completely finished, with groundwork still in progress. The school was later named "Elgin Rural High School," and despite being named as such, it still additionally served grades 1-8.

=== Later history ===
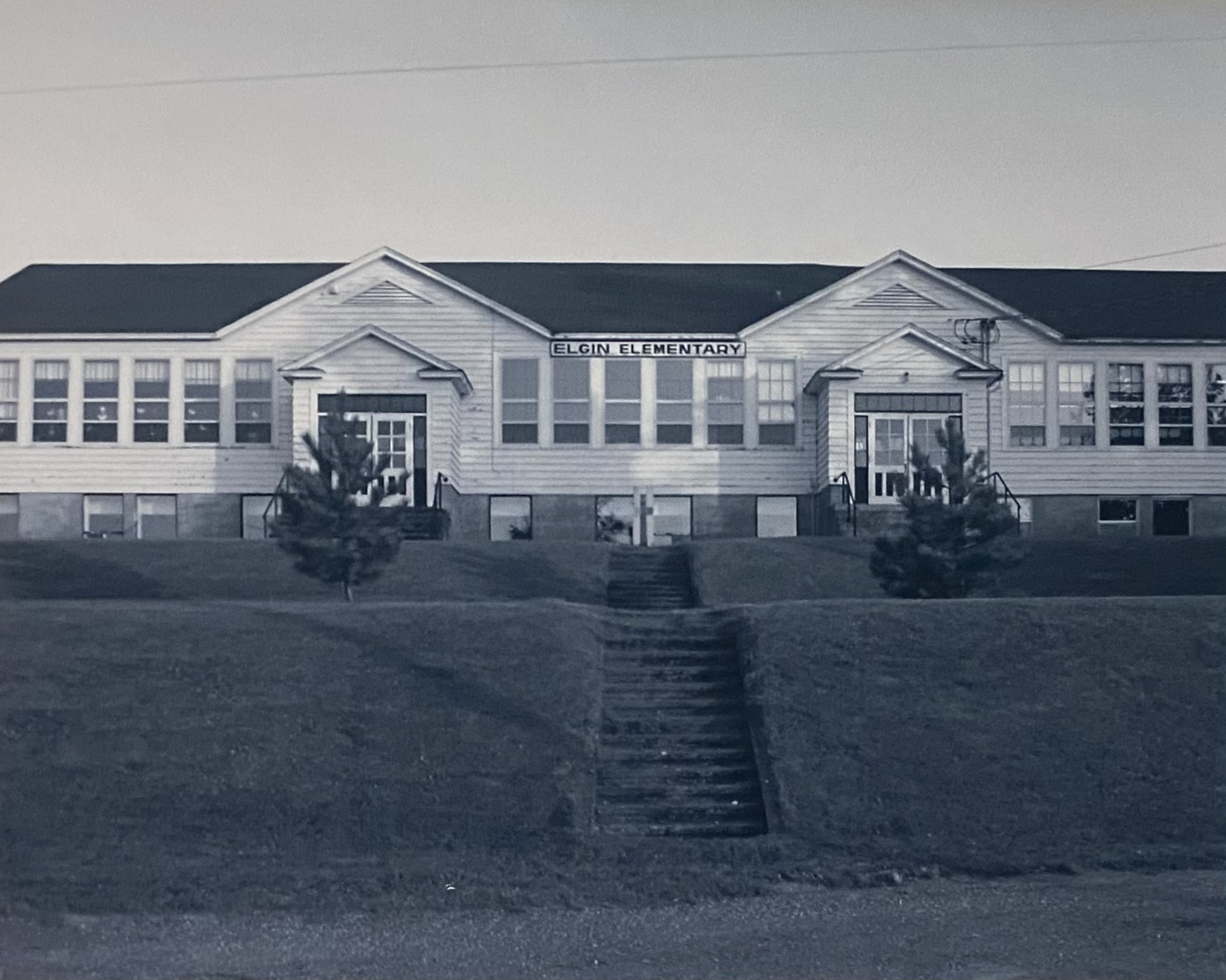
Elgin Elementary School, prior to being closed and broken down

Elgin's last school was the Elgin Elementary School, a white building with black trims built in 1947. Prior to its closure, the school was in New Brunswick School District 02. Located on 1833 Route 895, the K–5 school utilized composite classes.

In September 2001, Elgin Elementary School began facing potential closure after a school district council meeting was held. The proposal cited CA$193,200 worth of urgent repairs needed for the building, which superintendent Jim Stevenson argued they were unable to afford. At the time, Elgin Elementary School had a student enrollment of just 35 and the building was using only a fifth of its full capacity. Elgin residents opposed the school's closure, arguing that it produced high-quality students and the lengthy busing times to the nearest alternative, Petitcodiac Regional High School. On April 2, 2002, a unanimous vote by the education council resulted in Elgin Elementary School's closure to be recommended. On May 8, a special public meeting was held by the district education to re-evaluate the school's closure, which proved unsuccessful, and the school was ultimately ordered to be closed by Education Minister Dennis Furlong. Education in Elgin would cease after Elgin Elementary School held its final school day in June 2002.

In July 2002, Elgin residents made plans to convert the former elementary school into a public library. In July 2003, a group of locals emerged with their interest in turning the old school building into an eco-centre, considering the possibility of incorporating amenities such as a hostel, restaurant, environmental displays, museum, or a gift shop. Further discussion about converting the school took place shortly after the Elgin Eco Association, a non-profit environmental organization, was established in June 2004. Sandra MacDonald, a board member at the time, noted the sentimental value to the residents of the Elgin area. The association sought public input regarding a proposal to develop the property. The former school, situated on Route 895, was put up for sale by the Province of New Brunswick in 2007, and was later listed again.

== Economy ==
Blueberry agriculture plays a large part in Elgin's economy. In the past, Elgin held annual blueberry festivals where hundreds would attend to eat breakfast and watch the large parade that would cross through the village streets. The festival would also hold blueberry pie eating contests, display booths, and raffles. The first festival was held in 1981, but there had been fairs originally held years earlier, which stopped during the Second World War in 1939. In 1982, the festival saw 1,500 attendees.

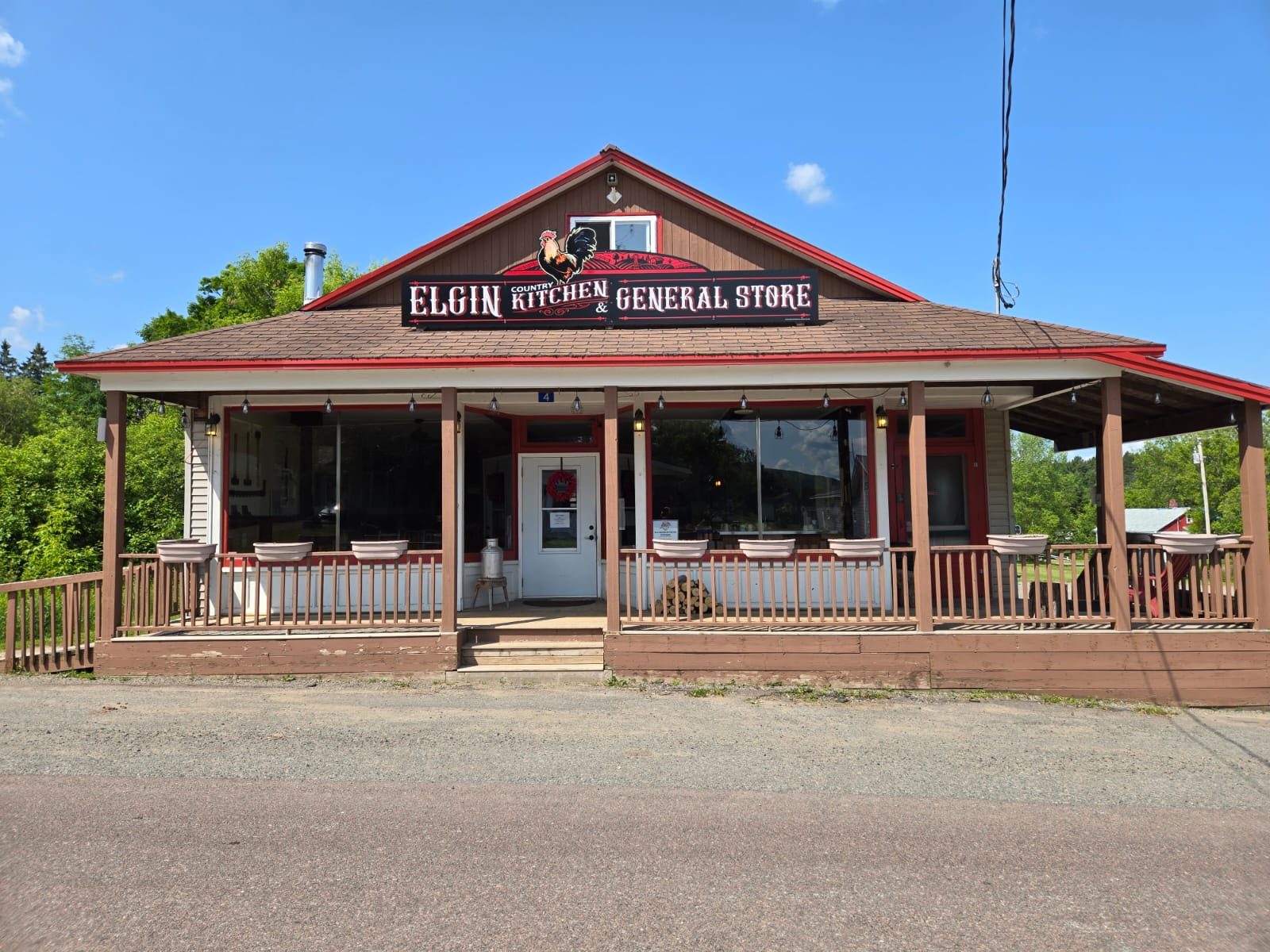
Elgin General Store

Elgin is the founding and headquarter site of Canadian Syrup Inc. (Steeves Maples), a maple syrup producing company established in 1869 which exports products internationally through distributor relationships. Elgin has also been utilized in mining operations, with certain areas having been involved in copper mining, and briefly after World War II, manganese mining took place in the region.

Elgin's last general store was located at the central part of the village. Built in 1948 and opening the following year, it was previously known as the Elgin County Market until it closed in August 2016. In 2020, it reopened under new ownership as the Elgin Country Kitchen and General Store, a combined general store and restaurant. It closed in 2025.

== Notable people ==
- Harry N. Jonah, member of the Legislative Assembly of New Brunswick (1957-1962)
- Eugene R. Steeves, trade unionist and civil servant

== See also ==
- List of communities in New Brunswick
