= Picadilly, New Brunswick =

Rural community in Canada

Coordinates: 45.713°N 65.401°W

Picadilly is a rural community in Kings County, New Brunswick, Canada. It is located immediately next to the village of Sussex Corner and at the eastern terminus of Route 111.

== See also ==
- List of communities in New Brunswick
