= Three Rivers, New Brunswick =

Three Rivers
- Municipality
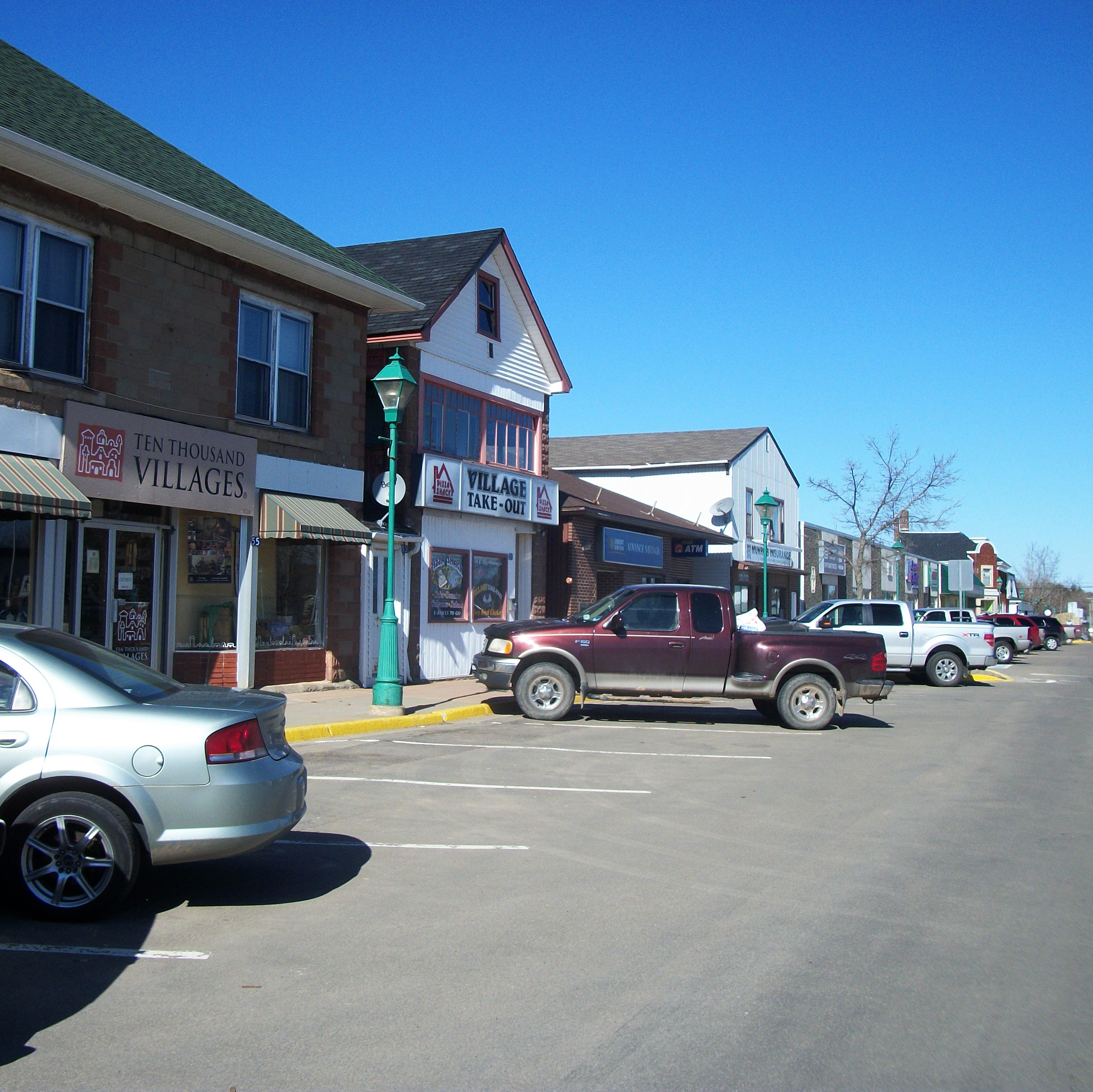
- Downtown Three Rivers

- Location within New Brunswick
- Coordinates: 45°56′00″N 65°10′00″W
- Country: Canada
- Province: New Brunswick
- County: Westmorland County
- Regional service commission: Southeast
- Incorporated: January 1, 2023
- Electoral Districts Federal: Fundy Royal
- Provincial: Gagetown-Petitcodiac

Government
  - Mayor: Peter Saunders
- Time zone: UTC-4 (AST)
  - Summer (DST): UTC-3 (ADT)

Three Rivers is a village in the Canadian province of New Brunswick. It was formed through the 2023 New Brunswick local governance reforms. It encompasses the former village of Petitcodiac. The Community of Three Rivers includes Elgin, Elgin Parish, areas north of Petiticodiac and a small portion of Salisbury.

== History ==
Three Rivers was incorporated on January 1, 2023.

== Present day ==
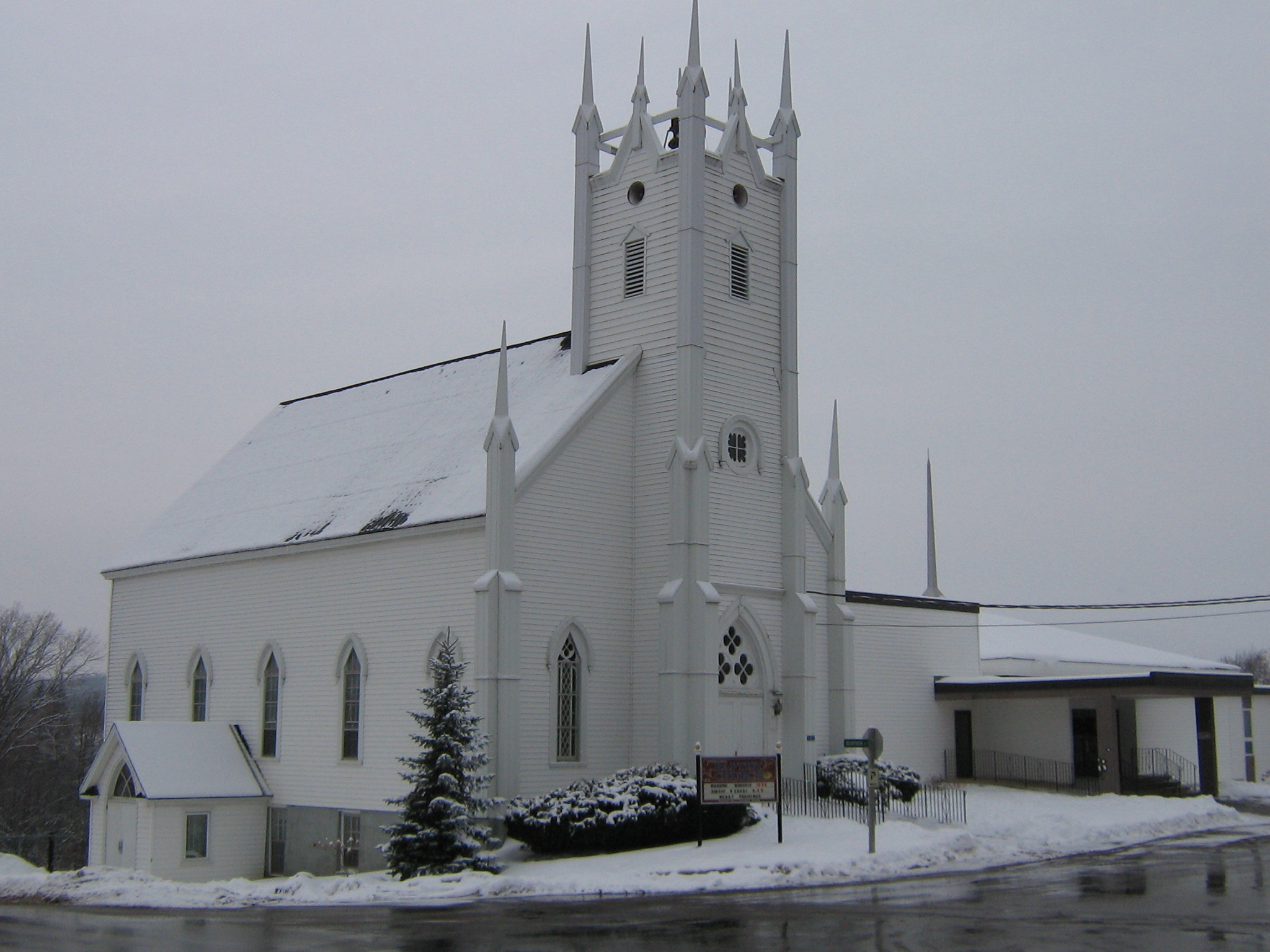
Petitcodiac Baptist Church on the banks of the Petitcodiac River. It was demolished in 2016 and rebuilt (new design) in 2018.

The Community Centres around Route 890, Route 885, Route 905, Route 106 and Route 1.

The village features a regional school, an outdoor swimming pool, an arena, a bowling alley, as well as several family-owned shops and churches servicing the surrounding area. There is also a Royal Canadian Air Cadet Squadron.

The Westmorland County Agricultural Fair, established by William Balzer in 1967, is an agricultural fair with a horse show, a sheep show, a produce contest, crafts and baked goods, and a beauty pageant.

== Neighbouring municipalities ==
- Moncton
- Dieppe
- Riverview
- Cap-Acadie
- Shediac
- Tantramar
- Memramcook
- Maple Hills
- Salisbury
- Fundy Albert
- Strait Shores

== See also ==
- List of communities in New Brunswick
- List of municipalities in New Brunswick
