= Midland, Albert County, New Brunswick =

Coordinates: 45.784764°N 65.136909°W

Location of Midland in New Brunswick

Midland is a community in Elgin Parish, Albert County in the Canadian province of New Brunswick.

== See also ==
- List of communities in New Brunswick

== Neighbouring communities ==
- Elgin
- Goshen
