= Petitcodiac Regional School =

Location
- 1 Corey Avenue; Three Rivers, New Brunswick; Canada; 45.9341°N 65.1793°W

Information
- Type: Public Secondary
- Motto: "Semper Hodie Non Cras" (Always Today, Never Tomorrow)
- Established: 1951
- School district: Anglophone East School District
- Superintendent: Randolph MacLean
- School number: 1604
- Principal: Yvan Pelletier
- Vice principals: Tracy Johnston-Lovely, Nathaniel Fells, & Meg Stead
- Staff: 48
- Grades: K - 12
- Enrollment: 700+
- Colours: Maroon and Gold
- Mascot: Panther
- Website: prs.nbed.nb.ca

Petitcodiac Regional School is a combined primary and secondary public school located in Three Rivers, New Brunswick, Canada.

It was originally built in 1951 and presently houses approximately 700 students from Kindergarten through grade 12 with a staff of approximately 48 teachers. The school contains three unique and separate areas housing the elementary school, the middle school and the high school with a common gymnasium, art rooms, music rooms, wood shop, mechanics garage, welding shop, and cafeteria.

Grades Kindergarten-5 is elementary, 6-8 is middle school, and 9-12 is high school.

== See also ==
- Anglophone East School District
