= Anagance, New Brunswick =

Coordinates: 45.867389°N 65.2495°W

Location of Anagance in New Brunswick

Anagance is a community in the Canadian province of New Brunswick. It is situated in Cardwell, a parish of Kings County.

== History ==
Anagance was founded in 1810. The locality was dependent on farming and received a railroad station during the latter half of the 19th century.

== See also ==
- List of communities in New Brunswick
- List of people from Kings County, New Brunswick
